= Sir Hamilton =

Sir Hamilton can refer to:

- Bill Hamilton (engineer), New Zealander who developed the modern jetboat.
- Sir Charles Hamilton, 3rd Baronet, British army officer.
- Sir Edward Hamilton, 1st Baronet, Royal Navy admiral
- Edward Walter Hamilton, political diarist.
- Frederick Hamilton (soldier), 17th-century soldier and planter.
- Sir George Hamilton, 1st Baronet, of Ilford, British politician.
- Sir George Hamilton, 1st Baronet of Donalong, 17th-century Irish baronet.
- Ian Standish Monteith Hamilton, British Army general.
- James Hamilton of Cadzow, 15th-century Scottish nobleman.
- James Hamilton, 1st Earl of Abercorn, Scottish nobleman.
- James Hamilton, 4th Duke of Hamilton, general and peer.
- John Hamilton, 1st Lord Belhaven and Stenton, 17th-century Scottish nobleman.
- Lewis Hamilton, British racing driver, activist, fashion designer and musician.
- Patrick Hamilton of Kincavil, 16th-century Scottish nobleman.
- Robert George Crookshank Hamilton, governor of Tasmania.
- Sir Robert North Collie Hamilton, 6th Baronet, 19th-century English politician and East India Company civil servant.
- Thomas Hamilton, 1st Earl of Haddington, Scottish peer.
- William Hamilton (diplomat), 18th-century Scottish diplomat.
- Sir William Hamilton, 9th Baronet, Scottish metaphysician.
- William Rowan Hamilton, Irish scientist.
