= Hamilton baronets of Trebinshun House (1819) =

Escutcheon of the Hamilton baronets of Trebinshun House

The Hamilton baronetcy, of Trebinshun House in the County of Brecon, was created in the Baronetage of the United Kingdom on 26 January 1819 for the naval commander Admiral Sir Edward Hamilton. He was the younger son of Sir John Hamilton, 1st Baronet, of Marlborough House. His grandson the 2nd Baronet succeeded as the 4th baronet of Marlborough House in 1892, and the titles merged. Both baronetcies became extinct in 2008.

== Hamilton baronets, of Trebinshun House (1819) ==
- Sir Edward Joseph Hamilton, 1st Baronet (1771–1851)
- Sir Edward Archibald Hamilton, 2nd Baronet (1843–1915), (succeeded as 4th Baronet of Marlborough House in 1892).

See Hamilton baronets of Marlborough House (1776) for the later succession.

== Notes ==
Baronetage of the United Kingdom
Preceded by Bateson baronets	Hamilton baronets of Trebinshun House; 26 January 1819	Succeeded by Mahon baronets
