= Hamilton baronets of Marlborough House (1776) =

Escutcheon of the Hamilton baronets, of Marlborough House

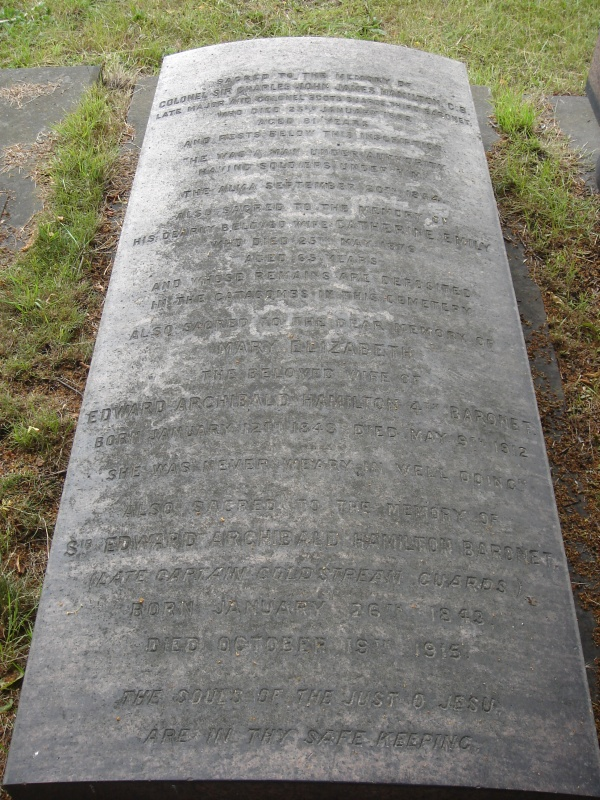
Funerary monument to Sir Charles Hamilton, 3rd Baronet, at Brompton Cemetery, London

The Hamilton baronetcy, of Marlborough House, Portsmouth in the County of Southampton, was created in the Baronetage of Great Britain on 26 August 1776 for John Hamilton, He was a captain in the Royal Navy who distinguished himself at the Battle of Quebec in 1775. He was the son of John Hamilton, High Sheriff of Kent in 1719, son of William Hamilton (brother of James Hamilton, 6th Earl of Abercorn), one of the "Kentish Petitioners", younger son of Colonel James Hamilton, eldest son of Sir George Hamilton, 1st Baronet, of Donalong and Neneagh, fourth son of James Hamilton, 1st Earl of Abercorn (see Duke of Abercorn). Hamilton's younger son Edward Joseph Hamilton was created a baronet in his own right in 1819 (see Hamilton baronets of Trebinshun House (1819)).

He was succeeded by his elder son, the 2nd Baronet, an admiral and Member of Parliament. On his death the title passed to his son, the 3rd Baronet, a Colonel in the British Army. He was succeeded by his first cousin once removed, Sir Edward Archibald Hamilton, 2nd Baronet, of Trebinshun House, who became the 4th Baronet of Marlborough House as well. His eldest son, the fifth/third Baronet died without surviving male issue and was succeeded by his younger brother, the sixth/fourth Baronet. In 2008, with the death of the seventh/fifth Baronet both creations became extinct.

== Hamilton baronets, of Marlborough House (1776) ==
- Sir John Hamilton, 1st Baronet (1726–1784)
- Sir Charles Hamilton, 2nd Baronet (1767–1849)
- Sir Charles John James Hamilton, 3rd Baronet CB (3 April 1810 – 23 January 1892). Hamilton was a British Army officer. He was the son of Sir Charles Hamilton, 2nd Baronet. He was a colonel in the Scots Guards and fought in the Crimean War, most notably at the Battle of Alma. He died 23 January 1892 and is buried in Brompton Cemetery, London. Hamilton was married to Catherine Emily, Lady Hamilton and his first cousin once removed Edward succeeded him.
- Sir Edward Archibald Hamilton, 4th and 2nd Baronet (1843–1915)
- Sir (Charles Edward) Archibald Watkin Hamilton, 5th and 3rd Baronet (1876–1939)
- Sir (Thomas) Sydney Percival Hamilton, 6th and 4th Baronet (1881–1966)
- Sir Edward Sydney Hamilton, 7th and 5th Baronet (1925–2008)

== Notes ==
Baronetage of Great Britain
Preceded by Etherington baronets	Hamilton baronets of Marlborough House; 24/6 August 1776	Succeeded by Winn baronets
