= Sir Charles Hamilton, 2nd Baronet, of Marlborough House =

Royal Navy Admiral and colonial administrator (1767–1849)

Admiral Sir Charles Hamilton Bt KCB
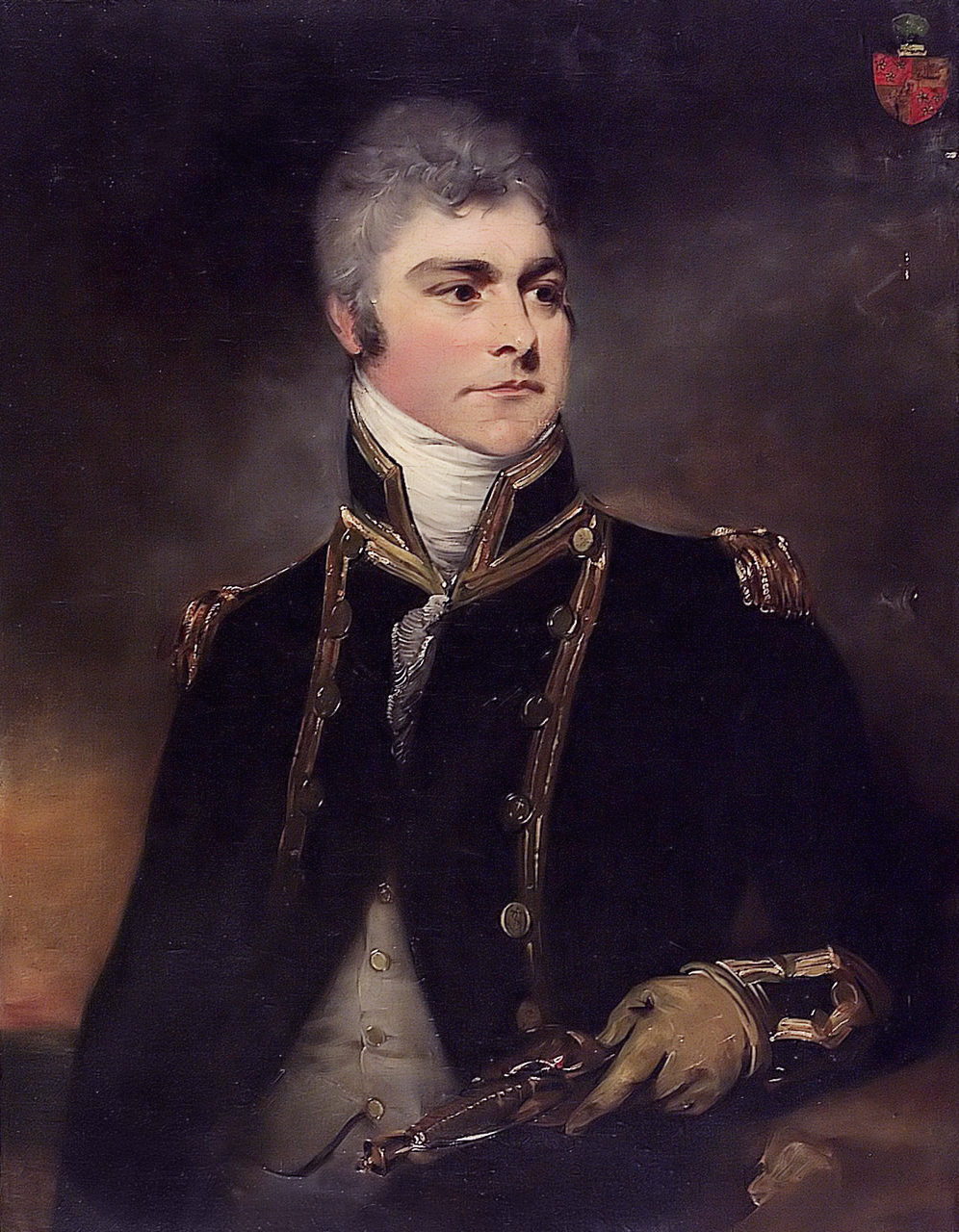
- Portrait of Hamilton by William Beechey

Member of the Great Britain Parliament for St Germans
- In office 1789–1790 Serving with Samuel Smith
- Preceded by: John Hamilton; Samuel Smith
- Succeeded by: George Cambell; Edward James Eliot

Member of Parliament for Dungannon
- In office 1801–1802
- Preceded by: New Constituency
- Succeeded by: George Knox
- In office 1803–1804
- Preceded by: George Knox
- Succeeded by: George Knox

Member of Parliament for Honiton
- In office 1807–1812 Serving with Augustus Cavendish-Bradshaw
- Preceded by: Thomas Cochrane; Augustus Cavendish-Bradshaw
- Succeeded by: Howard Vyse; Sir George Robinson

42nd Governor of Newfoundland
- In office 1818–1823
- Preceded by: John Bowker
- Succeeded by: Sir Thomas Cochrane

Personal details
- Born: 25 May 1767
- Died: 14 September 1849 (aged 82)
- Military career
- Allegiance: Great Britain; United Kingdom
- Branch: Royal Navy
- Rank: Admiral
- Awards: Knight Commander of the Order of the Bath

Viceregal styles of Sir Charles Hamilton
- Reference style: His Excellency
- Spoken style: Your Excellency

Admiral Sir Charles Hamilton, 2nd Baronet, KCB (25 May 1767 – 14 September 1849) was a Royal Navy officer and colonial administrator who served as the commodore-governor of Newfoundland.

== Life ==
Hamilton was born the eldest son of John Hamilton, a captain in the Royal Navy who had distinguished himself at the Battle of Quebec in 1775. Charles began his naval career at the age of nine on his father's ship, Hector. He attended the Royal Naval Academy at Portsmouth from 1777 to 1779.

He commanded a number of vessels in the Royal Navy and was also a member of the British parliament several times between 1790 and 1812 while still serving in the Royal Navy. He became the 2nd baronet Hamilton of Marlborough House on his father's death in 1784.

From 1818 to 1823 he served as resident governor for the colony of Newfoundland. During this period, he oversaw the reconstruction of St. John's following fires in 1818 and 1819. Although he was charged with promoting agriculture, he was soon discouraged by the poor soils of the island. The economy of the island was depressed due to decreased demand for Newfoundland cod and Hamilton encouraged diversification of the fisheries to include whales, seals and salmon.

Hamilton was promoted to admiral on 22 July 1830, and was awarded KCB in 1833.

He died at the family home at Iping, West Sussex in 1849. He had married Henrietta Martha, the daughter of George Drummond, a banker of Stanmore, Middlesex. Their only son, Sir Charles John James Hamilton, 3rd Baronet, also became an Army officer. Lady Hamilton painted a well-known portrait of Demasduit, also called Mary March, a Beothuk woman captured in 1818.

== Legacy ==
Hamilton is the namesake of Hamilton Inlet and, formerly, of the Hamilton River (now the Churchill River), both in Labrador.

== See also ==
- Governors of Newfoundland
- List of people of Newfoundland and Labrador

== Sources ==
- O'Byrne, William Richard (1849). "Hamilton, Charles" . A Naval Biographical Dictionary . John Murray – via Wikisource.

Parliament of Great Britain
| Preceded by John Hamilton; Samuel Smith | Member of Parliament for St Germans; 1789–1790; With: Samuel Smith | Succeeded by Marquess of Lorne; Edward James Eliot |
Parliament of the United Kingdom
| New constituency | Member of Parliament for Dungannon; 1801–1802 | Succeeded by George Knox |
| Preceded by George Knox | Member of Parliament for Dungannon; 1803–1806 | Succeeded by George Knox |
| Preceded by Augustus Cavendish-Bradshaw; Lord Cochrane | Member of Parliament for Honiton; 1807–1812; With: Augustus Cavendish-Bradshaw | Succeeded by Howard Vyse; Sir George Robinson |
| Preceded by John Bowker | Commodore Governor of Newfoundland; 1818–1823 | Succeeded by Sir Thomas Cochrane |
Baronetage of Great Britain
| Preceded by John Hamilton | Baronet (of Marlborough House); 1784–1849 | Succeeded by Charles Hamilton |
