= Deadman's Island (Kent) =

Island in the Medway estuary, England

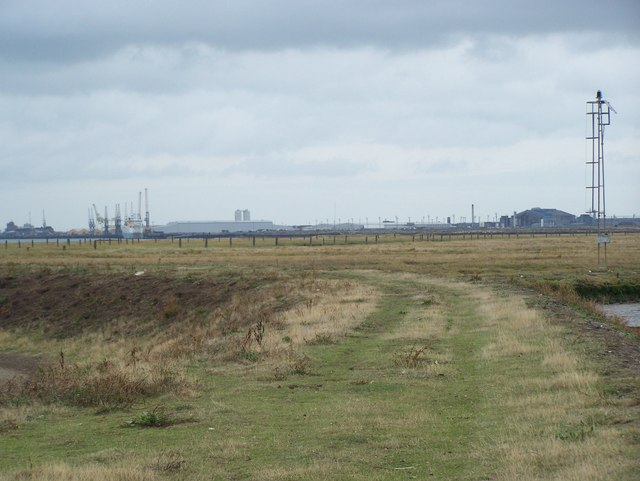
- looking across Deadman's Island to the works on the Isle of Grain

- Location within Kent

Geography
- Location: River Medway estuary
- Coordinates: 51.4212°N 0.7223°E
- Length: 1.2 km (0.75 mi)
- Width: 0.2 km (0.12 mi)

Administration
- England
- County: Kent
- Borough: Swale

Demographics
- Population: 0

Deadman's Island is a small island in the estuary of the River Medway in Kent, United Kingdom close to where The Swale flows into the Medway. It is a flat, raised area of marshland around 1,200 metres (3,900 ft) long and 200 metres (660 ft) wide among the tidal sand banks on the southern side of the estuary and separated from the British mainland of Chetney Marshes by a narrow channel known as Shepherd's Creek. The town of Queenborough lies around one kilometre (0.62 mi) to the east across the West Swale channel. The island is crossed by several narrow tidal channels that mean that at high tide the island is separated into several smaller islands.

The island consists primarily of mudbanks and is uninhabited. Owned by Natural England, it is leased to two people, and is also a Site of Special Scientific Interest (SSSI) due to its importance as a nesting and breeding site for birds.

In 2016 the remains of more than 200 humans were found on the island. It is believed that the remains are those of men and boys who died of disease on board prison hulks, floating prisons that were moored in the area in the 19th Century. Originally buried in wooden coffins under six feet (1.8 m) of mud, coastal erosion and rising sea levels have washed away the mud to expose the remains at times of low tide. The island is marked with wooden posts across it, though these are probably to help identify the island and prevent erosion, and not grave markers as sometimes claimed.

== See also ==
- Burntwick Island
