= HMS Grafton (1771) =

Ship of the line of the Royal Navy

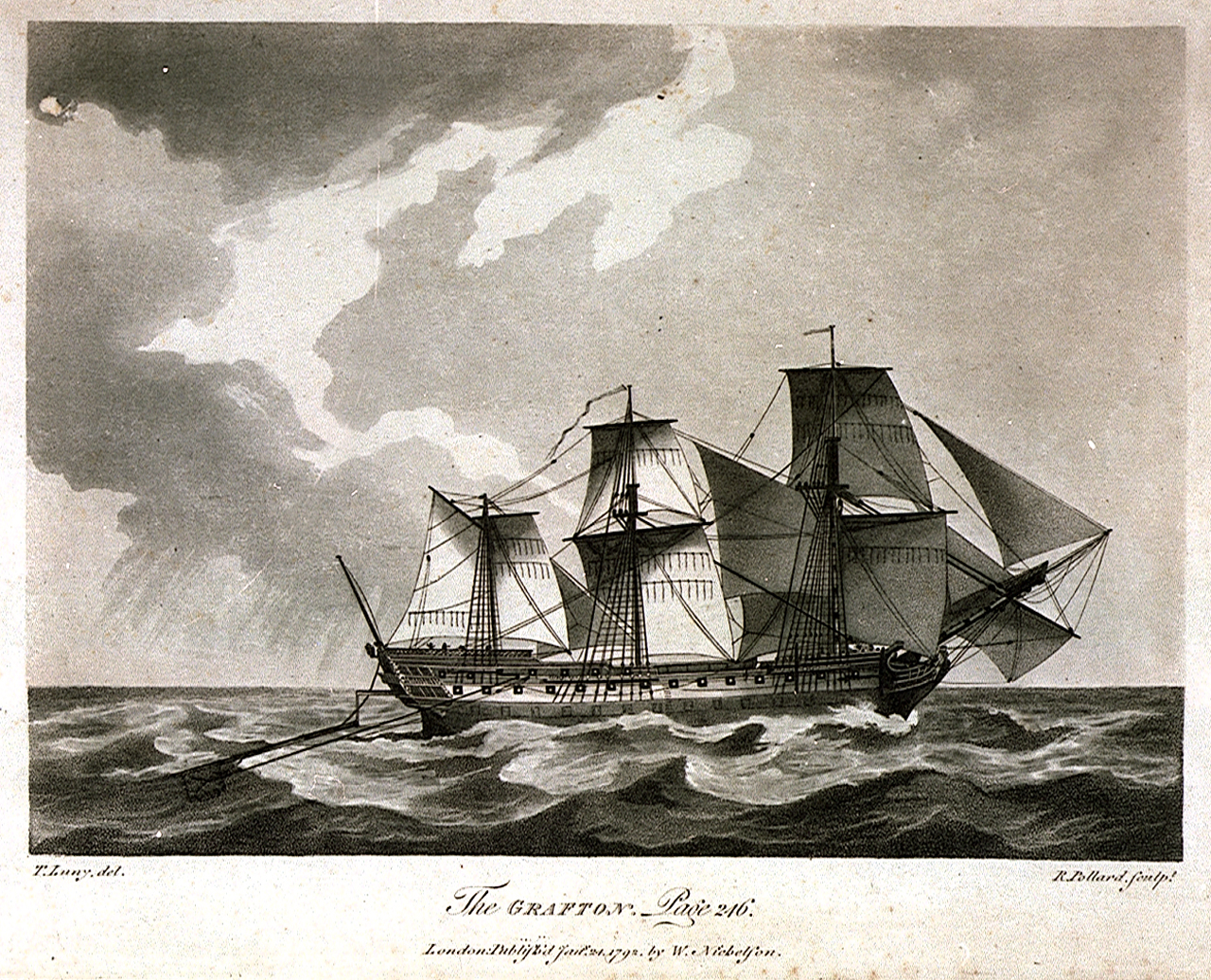
- HMS Grafton

History

Great Britain
- Name: HMS Grafton
- Ordered: 22 October 1767
- Builder: Deptford Dockyard
- Laid down: 1 July 1768
- Launched: 26 September 1771
- Honours and awards: Participated in: Battle of Grenada; Battle of Martinique
- Fate: Broken up, 1816

General characteristics
- Class & type: Albion-class ship of the line
- Tons burthen: 165185/94 (bm)
- Length: 168 ft (51 m) (gundeck)
- Depth of hold: 18 ft 10 in (5.74 m)
- Propulsion: Sails
- Sail plan: Full-rigged ship
- Armament: 74 guns: Gundeck: 28 × 32 pdrs; Upper gundeck: 28 × 18 pdrs; Quarterdeck: 14 × 9 pdrs; Forecastle: 4 × 9 pdrs

HMS Grafton was a 74-gun third-rate ship of the line of the Royal Navy, built by Adam Hayes launched on 26 September 1771 at Deptford Dockyard. One of the largest ships in the navy she had a crew of 550 men.

== Service history ==
May, 1778 under command of Capt. Andrew Wilkinson.

In 1779 she fought at the head of the British line at the Battle of Grenada, and in 1780 she was part of Rodney's fleet at the Battle of Martinique.

From 1792 Grafton was on harbour service, and she was broken up in 1816.

== Notable Commanders ==
- Captain Thomas Collingwood briefly in 1779
- Captain William Affleck briefly in 1780
- Captain Frederick Lewis Maitland briefly in 1782
- Captain Stair Douglas briefly in 1782
- Sir John Hamilton 1782/3
