= Etherington baronets =

Hereditary title in the Baronetage of Great Britain

Escutcheon of the Etherington baronets

The Etherington baronetcy, of Kingston-upon-Hull, was a title in the Baronetage of Great Britain. It was created on 22 November 1775 for Henry Etherington. He was the son and namesake of Henry Etherington, a wealthy Kingston-upon-Hull merchant.

Etherington married in 1773 Maria Constantia Cave, fourth daughter of Sir Thomas Cave, 5th Baronet. The title became extinct on Etherington's death without issue in 1819.

== Etherington baronets, of Kingston-upon-Hull (1775) ==
- Sir Henry Etherington, 1st Baronet (c. 1732–1819)

Baronetage of Great Britain
Preceded by Leith baronets	Etherington baronets of Burgh St Peter; 22 November 1775	Succeeded by Hamilton baronets
