= HMS Lizard (1757) =

Coventry-class Royal Navy frigate

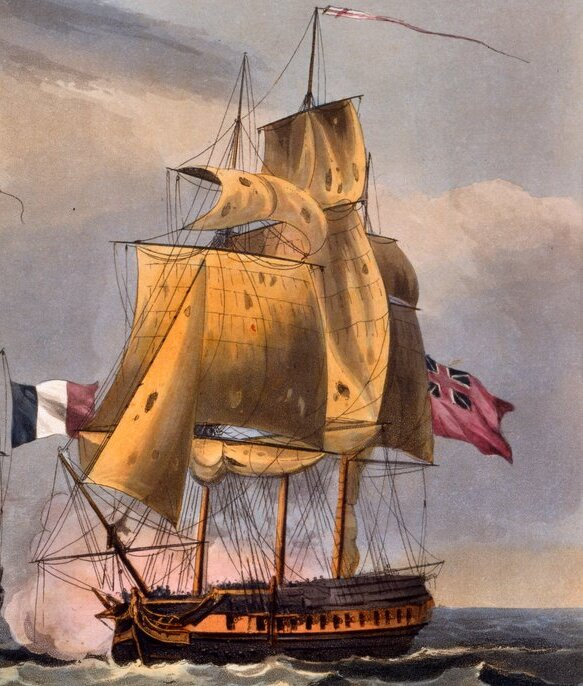
- Lizard was ordered to be built to the same design as HMS Carysfort (pictured) (Note: Admiralty Orders were identical for the design of Carysfort and Lizard. However Carysfort was constructed by the Royal Dockyard at Sheerness to the exact contract specifications, while Lizard was built by a private shipwright granted allowance to make "such alterations withinboard as shall be judged necessary." The result was a minor variation between the vessels with Lizard being 0 ft 4 1/2 in (0.1 m) longer on her gundeck, 0 ft 1 1/2 in (0.0 m) shorter in her keel and 0 ft 3 in (0.1 m) wider in her beam.)

History

Great Britain
- Name: HMS Lizard
- Ordered: 13 April 1756
- Builder: Henry Bird, Globe Stairs, Rotherhithe
- Laid down: 5 May 1756
- Launched: 7 April 1757
- Completed: 1 June 1757 at Deptford Dockyard
- Commissioned: March 1757
- Honours and awards: Plains of Abraham, 1759; British expedition against Martinique, 1762; Battle of Havana, 1762
- Fate: Sold out of service, 1828

General characteristics
- Class & type: 28-gun Coventry-class sixth-rate frigate
- Tons burthen: 59487/94 (bm)
- Length: 118 ft 8 1/2 in (36.2 m) (gundeck); 97 ft 2 3/4 in (29.6 m) (keel)
- Beam: 33 ft 11 in (10.3 m)
- Depth of hold: 10 ft 6 in (3.2 m)
- Sail plan: Full-rigged ship
- Complement: 200
- Armament: 28 guns comprising: Gundeck: 24 × 9-pounder guns; Quarterdeck: 4 × 3-pounder guns; 12 × ½-pdr swivel guns

HMS Lizard was a 28-gun Coventry-class sixth-rate frigate of the Royal Navy, with periods of service between 1757 and 1828. Named after the Lizard, a peninsula in southern Cornwall, she was intended as a broad-beamed and sturdy vessel designed for lengthy periods at sea. Her crewing complement was 200 and, when fully equipped, she was armed with 24 nine-pounder cannons, supported by 4 three-pounders and 12 1/2-pounder swivel guns. Despite her comparatively heavy design, she was plagued with maintenance problems and had to be repeatedly removed from service for repair.

Lizard's early seagoing service included active duty during the Seven Years' War from 1757–1763. In this capacity she assisted in major naval operations in the Caribbean and North America, including the British capture of Quebec City and the Siege of Havana. After three years as a peacetime privateer-hunter between 1771–1774, she resumed wartime service during the American Revolutionary War from 1775–1782. Thereafter she aided British efforts between 1790–1794 in the leadup and early years of the French Revolutionary War including patrolling the North Sea for privateers. Across these periods of service Lizard secured 43 victories at sea, principally against American and French merchant vessels and privateers.

Removed from seagoing duty in 1794, Lizard was refitted as a hospital ship and assigned to a berth near Burntwick Island where she received merchant seamen suspected of suffering from diseases including yellow fever and bubonic plague. What had been intended as a temporary assignment continued for 28 years, with Lizard eventually becoming the last of the Coventry-class vessels still in operation. She was removed from service, 71 years after her launch, and sold to private ownership at Sheerness Dockyard in September 1828.

== Construction ==
=== Design and crew ===
Lizard was an oak-built 28-gun sixth rate, one of 18 vessels forming part of the Coventry class of frigates. (Note: The Coventry-class sailing frigates were a repurposing of the traditional frigate to meet the challenge posed by faster, more manoeuivreable French vessels during the Seven Years' War. Before 1744, Royal navy frigates were generally constructed to designs based on the 1719 Establishment, which was itself drawn from British naval tradition dating to the seventeeth century. Armament was generally two rows of small 6-pounder cannons carried on an open upper deck, leaving them exposed to enemy fire. Their enclosed lower deck was fitted for sweep rowing, while the upper works included high bulwarks and a long quarterdeck which rendered the vessel top-heavy and inclined to roll in high seas. When compared with French frigates of the Seven Years' War, these pre-1744 designs were slow, unwieldy in rough weather and less durable when sustaining enemy fire. The new Coventry-class, among others, copied elements of French design to address these defects and create a faster, more seaworthy vessel capable of capable of carrying a greater poundage of cannon without exposing the crew to enemy musket fire. Accompanying this change in frigate design were variations in the size and armament of British ships of the line – generally three-decked vessels of first, second or third-rate which were manouvreable enough to maintain a line of battle parallel to an enemy fleet and able to deliver and withstand a broadside from massed guns. Frigates, both pre- and post-1744, were too small and fragile for this purpose and served instead as convoy escorts, privateer hunters, as messengers between fleets and – taking advantage of their shallow draught – to take the attack to enemy ports and vessels in coastal waters.) As with others in her class she was loosely modeled on the design and external dimensions of HMS Tartar, launched in 1756 and responsible for capturing five French privateers in her first twelve months at sea. The Admiralty Order to build the Coventry-class vessels was made after the outbreak of the Seven Years' War, and at a time in which the Royal Dockyards were fully engaged in constructing or fitting-out the Navy's ships of the line. Consequently, despite Navy Board misgivings about reliability and cost, contracts for all but one of Coventry-class vessels were issued to private shipyards with an emphasis on rapid completion of the task.

Contracts for Lizard's construction were issued on 13 April 1756 to shipwright Henry Bird of Globe Stairs, Rotherhithe. It was stipulated that work should be completed within twelve months for a fully-rigged 28-gun vessel measuring approximately 590 13/94 tons burthen, with a gundeck of 117 ft 10 in (35.9 m), keel 96 ft 8.5 in (29.5 m), beam 33 ft 8 in (10.3 m) and hold depth 10 ft 2 in (3.1 m). Subject to satisfactory completion, Bird would receive a fee of £sd£9.9s per ton to be paid through periodic imprests drawn against the Navy Board. (Note: Bird's £9.9s fee per ton compared unfavourably with an average £9.0s per ton sought by Thames River shipwrights to build 24-gun Royal Navy vessels over the previous decade, but was exactly equal to the average for all Coventry-class vessels built in private shipyards between 1756 and 1765.) Private shipyards were not subject to rigorous naval oversight, and the Admiralty therefore granted authority for "such alterations withinboard as shall be judged necessary" in order to cater for the preferences or ability of individual shipwrights, and for experimentation with internal design.

Lizard's keel was laid down on 5 May 1756, and work proceeded swiftly with the fully-built vessel ready for launch by April 1757, comfortably within the stipulated time. In final construction the vessel's hull was slightly larger than contracted, at 594 87/94 tons burthen, with a gundeck of 118 ft 8 1/2 in (36.2 m), a 97 ft 2 3/4 in (29.6 m) keel, a beam of 33 ft 11 in (10.3 m), and a hold depth of 10 ft 6 in (3.2 m). These slightly exceeded the dimensions specified in Bird's contract. However these minor variations did not affect final settlement of the contract, with Bird receiving £5,540.14s, equivalent to £822,907 in 2023, for his shipyard's work.

The vessel was named after the Lizard, a peninsula in southern Cornwall that was a maritime landmark for vessels passing along the English Channel. In selecting her name, the Board of Admiralty continued a tradition dating to 1644 of using geographic features for ship names; overall, ten of the nineteen Coventry-class vessels were named after well-known regions, rivers or towns. With few exceptions, the remainder of the class were named after figures from classical antiquity, following a more modern trend initiated in 1748 by John Montagu, 4th Earl of Sandwich in his capacity as First Lord of the Admiralty. (Note: The exceptions to these naming conventions were Hussar, Active and the final vessel in the class, Hind)

Lizard's designated complement was 200, comprising two commissioned officers – a captain and a lieutenant – overseeing 40 warrant and petty officers, 91 naval ratings, 38 Marines and 29 servants and other ranks. The 29 servants and other ranks provided for in the ship's complement consisted of 20 personal servants and clerical staff, four assistant carpenters, an assistant sailmaker, and four widow's men. Unlike naval ratings, servants and other ranks took no part in the sailing or handling of the ship. Armament comprised 24 nine-pounder cannons located along her gun deck, supported by 4 three-pounder cannons on the quarterdeck and 12 1/2-pounder swivel guns ranged along her sides.

=== Sailing qualities ===
Lizard's design was broadly comparable with French frigates of equivalent size, but with a shorter and sturdier hull and greater weight in her broadside guns. She was also comparatively broad-beamed, with ample space for provisions and the ship's mess, and a large magazine for powder and round shot. (Note: Lizard's dimensional ratios of 3.57:1 in length to breadth, and 3.3:1 in breadth to depth, compare with standard French equivalents of up to 3.8:1 and 3:1 respectively. Royal Navy vessels of equivalent size and design to Lizard were capable of carrying up to 20 tons of powder and shot, compared with a standard French capacity of around 10 tons. The British vessels also carried greater stores of rigging, spars, sails and cables, but had fewer ship's boats and less space for the possessions of the crew.) Taken together, these characteristics aimed to enable Lizard to tack and wear more reliably than her French equivalents, and to remain at sea for longer periods without resupply. She was built with broad and heavy masts which balanced the weight of her hull, improved stability in rough weather and allowed her to carry a greater quantity of sail. The disadvantages of this heavy design were an overall decline in manoeuvrability and slower speed when sailing in light winds.

Lizard was plagued with construction and maintenance difficulties throughout her seagoing career, requiring seven major repairs or refits between 1769 and 1793. (Note: Major repairs or refits were required in 1769–1770, 1775, 1777, 1779, 1783–1784, 1790 and 1793. These do not include refits for changes of use: in 1780 for English Channel service, and in 1799–1800 for reuse as a hospital ship.) Private shipyards such as Henry Bird's used thinner hull planking than did the Royal Dockyards, producing less robust vessels which further decreased in seaworthiness after every major repair. Smaller vessels during the Seven Years' War were also hampered by the unavailability of seasoned oak, as the Royal Navy's supply was preferentially allocated to ships of the line. Frigates such as Lizard were therefore routinely repaired with unseasoned timber which could warp as it dried, causing cracks in decks and gun ports and leaks along the hull.

== Seven Years' War ==
=== North Atlantic, 1757–1758 ===
Lizard was commissioned by Captain Vincent Pearce in March 1757, while still under construction at Rotherhithe. She was launched on 7 April and sailed to Deptford Dockyard for fitting-out and to take on armament and crew. This was completed by 1 June and Lizard immediately put to sea to join a small squadron under the command of Admiral Samuel Cornish off the southwest coast of Cornwall. Britain had been at war with the French for more than a year, and Royal Navy vessels in waters surrounding England were routinely deployed to escort merchant fleets and hunt French privateers. It was in this second capacity that Lizard secured her first victories at sea, with the capture on 12 July 1757 of the 6-gun French privateer L'Hiver, and the recapture of a British merchantman loaded with rum and sugar which the French vessel had in tow. With assistance from members of Lizard's crew, both captured craft were sent in to the Irish port of Kinsale as prizes.

Lizard was reassigned in 1758 to a squadron under the command of Admiral George Anson, that was blockading the French seaport of Brest. Anson had directed that the 74-gun ship of the line HMS Shrewsbury maintain a position close to the Brest shoreline in order to observe the French fleet. Lizard was sent in support, accompanied by the 20-gun sixth-rate HMS Unicorn. On 12 September the three Royal Navy vessels were in position when their crews observed an approaching convoy of French coasters, escorted by the frigates Calypso and Thetis. The French sought to reach Brest without battle by sailing very close to land to take advantage of their shallow draft. Both Lizard and Unicorn moved toward the French with Lizard successfully interposing herself between the coasters and their escorting frigates. Thetis exchanged cannon fire with Lizard for around two hours before sheering off and taking shelter in the mouth of a river. Her companion Calypso attempted to manoeuvre around Lizard but ran aground and was wrecked on the shore. The unarmed French coasters then scattered, with many forced seaward where they were captured or destroyed by the British vessels. Lizard suffered one man killed and eight wounded in the battle. Following the action, she and Unicorn returned to their station alongside Shrewsbury in close observation of Brest. A further victory was secured on 2 October when Lizard pursued and captured Duc d'Hanovre, a 14-gun French privateer. (Note: Other sources simply name this vessel Le Hanovre.)

=== Americas, 1759–1763 ===
On 12 September 1759, Lizard's marines took part in a downstream assault on Quebec City ("Saunders' diversion," top right of map), while the main British force landed upstream at Anse-au-Foulon.

Captain James Doake took command of Lizard in mid-October 1758, bringing Admiralty orders reassigning the vessel to North American waters in support of a planned invasion of Québec in 1759. The winter idled by as the invasion force was assembled, until on 17 February 1759 the Lizard departed Spithead for Halifax, Nova Scotia, accompanied by other Royal Navy vessels. On arrival in Nova Scotia, she joined the combined British fleet of 52 naval vessels and 140 transports, under the overall command of Vice-Admiral Charles Saunders. On 23 June the fleet passed L'Isle-aux-Coudres on the St Lawrence River, and three days later anchored before the French stronghold of Quebec City. There were few French vessels at Quebec City, and little useful work for frigates such as Lizard, though her sister vessel Trent was able to bombard and destroy an artillery battery on the shoreline. Lizard remained below Quebec throughout July and August while other parts of Saunders' fleet reconnoitred and captured the river above the town. On 12 September Lizard's marines were part of a landing below the town as a feint to distract from the real British landing – conducted by forces under General James Wolfe upstream on the Plains of Abraham. Wolfe's assault was successful, and Quebec City was surrendered on 17 September. Lizard then returned to England with the majority of the fleet.

The British campaign in Québec continued in early 1760 with plans for an assault on Montreal. After wintering at Portsmouth, Lizard was back in North American waters by February as reinforcement for a British squadron on the St Lawrence River. After the fall of Montreal in September she was reassigned to Britain's Leeward Islands Station as a privateer hunter and as protection for merchant convoys. The British had set their sights on the French Caribbean stronghold of Martinique, with Secretary of State for the Southern Department, Sir William Pitt, directing that all available resources be committed to its invasion. An army of 13,000 troops was assembled, supported by a fleet under Admiral George Rodney. Lizard's armament was increased to 32 guns, and she was added to Rodney's sizeable command which sailed as part of the expedition in January 1762. She was present when the British landings commenced, and her crew were among those entitled to a formal share of plunder from the French settlement of Fort Royal when this was distributed by Admiralty in 1764.

A newly-signed alliance between France and Spain in August 1761 led to Britain's declaration of war on the Spanish from January 1762. Lizard was thereafter returned to the Leeward Islands to accompany an expected British assault on Havana, Spain's Caribbean stronghold. In May 1762 a British fleet of around 200 vessels was assembled under Admiral George Pocock to begin the siege. Lizard joined Pocock's fleet in June, and was designated as the flagship of Commodore James Douglas. At around this time James Doake resigned Lizard's command and was replaced aboard by Captain Francis Banks. Havana fell to the British at the end of July, and by August Lizard was released from the fleet. War with France and Spain concluded with the signing of the Treaty of Paris in March 1763. Lizard was declared surplus to Navy requirements, and returned to Portsmouth Dockyard in June to be paid off.

== Peacetime service ==
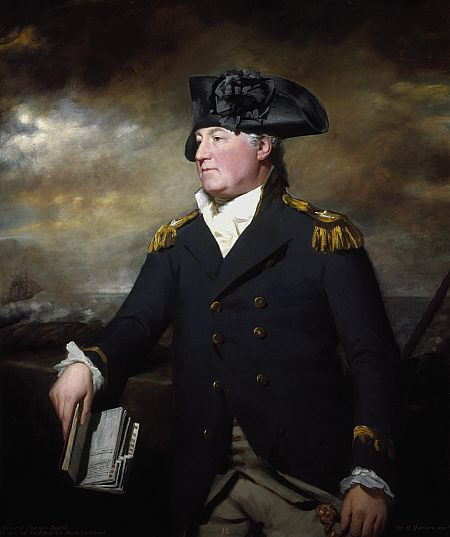
Charles Inglis, Lizard's captain in 1770–1771

Lizard was left at anchor for the next six years. A naval survey in 1769 found her unseaworthy and in need of extensive repair. Reconstruction and refitting took 16 months to complete and cost £8,211.16s, equivalent to £1,239,290 in 2023, which was significantly more than the vessel's original construction expense.

In 1770 the Spanish government demanded Britain cede control of its settlement at Port Egmont in West Falkland, which Spain had claimed as its territory. When this was refused, a small Spanish force captured the port in June 1770 and expelled its British settlers. Admiralty therefore ordered a mobilisation of Navy vessels to escort a British expedition to retake the settlement. Lizard was available for this purpose, and so was recommissioned in October 1770 under Captain Charles Inglis for Falklands service. However her departure from Portsmouth was delayed by the need for further repairs. She was still fitting out at Portsmouth in January 1771 when a treaty between Britain and Spain brought the Falklands dispute to a close.

No longer required for Falklands duty, Lizard made an uneventful return voyage to Gibraltar in June 1771. There was considerable resentment among the crew at the continued requirements of naval service during peacetime, such that all but 35 men deserted the ship when she returned to Portsmouth. A replacement crew was assembled by September 1771, after which Lizard was assigned to patrol and privateer-hunting duty along the North American coast. After three years at this station she returned to England to be paid off and her crew dispersed.

== American Revolutionary War ==
Lizard was refitted for active service in June 1775, following the outbreak of the American Revolutionary War. Recommissioned under Captain John Hamilton, she was again assigned to service along the St Lawrence River, on the same station that she had occupied in the previous war in 1759. Command was passed to Captain Thomas Mackenzie in June 1776. On 4 December Lizard secured her first victory of the war with the capture of the American privateer Putnam. A month later Lizard was returned to Plymouth Dockyard for refit and repair, with works lasting until mid-1777. On her return to North America in October, Lizard was assigned alongside her sister ship Carysfort and the 20-gun sixth-rate Perseus to disrupt American shipping off the Carolina coast. Considerable success followed over the next two months, with Lizard involved in the capture or destruction of 12 American or French merchant craft by the end of the year.

Vessels captured or sunk by Lizard in North American waters, 1777
Date	Ship	Nationality	Type	Fate	Ref.
1 November	Polly	American	Schooner carrying timber, apples, onions	Sunk	(Note: With Carysfort)
5 November	Reine Blanche	French	4-gun brig carrying salt, dry goods, alcohol	Captured	
8 November	Buckskin	American	Merchant vessel carrying tobacco, flour	Scuttled	
11 November	Santa Maria	American	4-gun sloop carrying clothing, rice and tobacco	Captured	
12 November	Enterprise	American	4-gun sloop carrying rice	Captured	
14 November	Mary Ann	American	Schooner carrying baggage, weapons and military uniforms	Captured	
21 November	Weatherall	American	Merchant vessel	Driven ashore and burnt	
21 November	Rebecca	American	Unarmed sloop carrying tobacco	Burnt	
26 November	Nancy	American	8-gun merchant vessel carrying rice	Sunk	
26 November	Polly	American	4-gun brig carrying rice and indigo	Captured	
7 December	Friendship	American	Merchant vessel carrying timber, sauce	Captured	
25 December	Marquis de Peley	French	10-gun privateer	Captured	(Note: Other sources attribute this victory solely to Perseus and Carysfort.)

Lizard's Carolinas patrol continued in 1778, with the frigate variously alone or again in company with Carysfort and Perseus. A further 21 vessels were taken or destroyed in the first three months of the year, including three French-owned craft on the same day in January 1778, and a Dutch brig captured on 1 February with stores intended for sale in rebel-held Charlestown.

Vessels captured or sunk by Lizard in North American waters, 1778
Date	Ship	Nationality	Type	Fate	Ref.
1 January	Hetty	French	Merchant vessel carrying salt, rum	Captured	
1 January	Not recorded	American	Brig carrying ballast	Sunk	
1 January	Not recorded	American	Brig carrying ballast	Sunk	
13 January	Ann	American	Brig carrying bricks and timber	Captured	
21 January	Bourbon	French	8-gun privateer	Captured	(Note: With Carysfort and Perseus.)
27 January	Flambeaux	French	Brig carrying coffee, sugar, rum	Captured	
27–28 January	Notre Dame des Charmes	French	Merchant vessel carrying rum, sugar, brandy	Captured	
27 January	L' Hambeau	French	Merchant vessel carrying rum, sugar, molasses	Captured	
1 February	Batavear	Dutch	Brig carrying gin, brandy, clothing	Captured	
24 February	Glanure	French	Merchant vessel	Captured	
By 4 April	Thomas	American	Merchant vessel	Burnt	
By 4 April	Nesbit	American	Merchant vessel	Burnt	
By 4 April	Rachel	Not recorded	Not recorded	Burnt	
By 4 April	Woodcock	American	Merchant vessel	Driven ashore	
By 4 April	Not recorded	American	Brig	Burnt	
By 4 April	Reflection	French	Brig	Captured	
By 4 April	L'Algonquin	French	10-gun privateer	Captured	
By 4 April	L'Andre	French	20-gun privateer	Captured	
By 4 April	Le Noir	French	Merchant vessel carrying clothes, wines, naval stores	Captured	
By 4 April	Pierce	French	Merchant vessel carrying rice, indigo	Captured	
By 4 April	Hope	American	Merchant vessel carrying rice	Captured	

Further refits were now required, and in mid-1778 Lizard was sailed to Chatham Dockyard for a series of repairs including copper sheathing for her hull to protect the timbers against shipworm. During this period, Mackenzie was replaced in command by Captain Francis Parry. On completion of her repairs, Lizard was thereafter assigned to service in the English Channel against French privateers and merchant shipping, France having formally entered the War on the American side.

On 18 May 1780 Lizard was in company with the 10-gun Royal Navy cutter HMS Busy in the Channel when they encountered the French-controlled cutter Jackal. (Note: Sources differ on whether this vessel was the former Royal Navy cutter HMS Jackal which had been lost to the French after her crew mutined in 1779, or another vessel of similar name.) The two cutters exchanged several rounds of cannonfire, badly damaging each other's sails and causing injuries among their crews. The battle ended as Lizard drew close enough to train its guns on Jackal. The French crew were now confronted with a considerable inequality of firepower and chose to surrender rather than risk further combat. Jackal was returned to Portsmouth as a prize, and the French crew imprisoned in Edinburgh for two months until they could be exchanged for English sailors held in France.

In 1781 Captain Parry was promoted to command of the 44-gun Actaeon, and was replaced aboard Lizard by Captain Edmund Dod. The frigate was assigned to protect a convoy of merchant vessels sailing for the West Indies, departing from England in March. On arrival in April, Lizard was formally added to the Navy's Leeward Islands Station and took up her post in the waters off Martinique and Jamaica. In January 1782 she was assigned to a fleet under Admiral Sir Samuel Hood, which had sailed to the relief of the besieged British settlement on Saint Kitts. While en route to Saint Kitts at the head of Hood's fleet, Lizard encountered and captured the 16-gun French cutter l'Espion, laden with a cargo of artillery shells and other ammunition. The French vessel was taken as a prize.

Lizard returned to the Leeward Islands following the relief of St. Kitts. Peace negotiations with France from 1782 were accompanied by a decline in naval activity, leaving the frigate surplus to the Admiralty's needs. In September 1782, she returned to Britain where she was decommissioned and her crew paid off for transfer to other vessels.

== French Revolutionary Wars ==
Lizard remained at anchor on the River Thames for eight years, undergoing desultory repairs to maintain her seaworthiness. Civil unrest in France in early 1790 encouraged the Admiralty to increase the number of vessels in active service, and Lizard was among those selected for a return to sea. She was refitted at the privately owned Blackwall Yard from May to August 1790 and recommissioned under Captain John Hutt in early September.

In preparation for war, the frigate spent eight months as a receiving ship for sailors seized by press gangs for compulsory naval service. On returning to Spithead in June 1791 she was joined to a squadron of six ships of the line under the overall command of Admiral Hood, which was sailing for Jamaica. The voyage proceeded without incident, and Lizard returned to Britain in September 1791 via the Scottish port of Leith, where her crew were discharged. Refitted at Portsmouth Dockyard, she was returned to sea in December 1792 for service during the War of the First Coalition against France. Under Captain Thomas Williams, the frigate was assigned to privateer hunting in the North Sea. In March 1793 she secured three successive victories, capturing the French privateers Les Trois Amis, Las Vaillant Custine and the 8-gun Le Sans-Cullotte, each of which was sent back to British ports as prize vessels. Despite these successes, the forty-year-old vessel was reaching the end of her seagoing career; after one final year in the North Sea she was returned to Portsmouth in May 1794 and permanently removed from active military roles.

== Hospital ship ==
"...two or three old Men of War that will serve as hulks to be fitted up as Lazarettes ... and one of smaller dimensions [Lizard] to be fitted up as an Hospital for the reception of the sick if any such be found on board, (as well as) ... an able medical person... to examine into the health of the crews and other persons on board ships arriving from the Levant."

— Excerpt from the 1799 Order of the Privy Council establishing Lizard as a hospital ship and authorising employment of a doctor to care for those aboard.

The ageing vessel lay unused at Portsmouth for the next five years. In 1797 she was placed under the nominal command of Lieutenant John Buller, who was relieved by Lieutenant James Macfarland in the following year. Under Macfarland's command in 1799, Lizard was brought to Chatham Dockyard for internal modifications to convert her into a hospital ship. These works coincided with public fears that yellow fever and bubonic plague could be brought to Britain via vessels from the eastern Mediterranean. On completion of the fitout in 1800 Lizard was sailed to Stangate Creek, near Burntwick Island in Kent, to care for sick seafarers discharged from quarantined merchantmen. She was accompanied by two largely derelict Navy vessels – Valiant and Duke – which were refitted as floating lazarettes.

Lizard's hospital ship assignment was intended to be temporary, pending construction of a permanent quarantine station atop the nearby Chetney Hill. However work on this facility was abandoned in 1810 for cost reasons and because the land surrounding the site was swampy and itself a centre for disease. Valiant was returned to sea in 1803, but Lizard and Duke remained at Stangate Creek for the next 28 years, catering for patients transferred from vessels under quarantine at other ports. The decrepit Lizard was finally removed from Navy service in 1828 and towed to Sheerness Dockyard for decommissioning. At the time she was the last of the Coventry-class still in use, and the only one beside Carysfort to have remained in service during the nineteenth century (Note: Built 10 years later than Lizard, Carysfort remained in more or less continuous naval service from 1767 to 1813, when she was sold for £1,800) On 22 September 1828 she was sold into private hands at Sheerness, for the sum of £810.

== Bibliography ==
- Albion, Robert Greenhalgh (2000). Forests and Sea Power: The Timber Problem of the Royal Navy, 1652–1862. Annapolis, Maryland: Naval Institute Press. ISBN 1557500215.
- Baugh, Daniel A. (1965). British Naval Administration in the Age of Walpole. Princeton, New Jersey: Princeton University Press. ISBN 9780691624297.
- Clark, William Bell (ed.). Naval Documents of the American Revolution (PDF). Vol. 11. Bolton Landing, New York: American Naval Records Society. ISBN 0160724953.
- Crawford, Michael J. (ed.). Naval Documents of the American Revolution (PDF). Vol. 10. Washington, D.C.: Naval Historical Center, Department of the Navy. ISBN 0160452864.
- Clowes, William Laird (1898). The Royal Navy: A History from the Earliest Times to the Present. Vol. 3. London: Sampson, Low, Marston and Company. OCLC 645627800.
- Clowes, William Laird (1899). The Royal Navy: A History From the Earliest Times to the Present. Vol. 4. London: Sampson Low, Marston and Company. OCLC 940253201.
- Dull, Jonathan (2009). The Age of the Ship of the Line: The British and French Navies, 1650–1815. Lincoln, Nebraska: University of Nebraska Press. ISBN 9780803235182.
- Gardiner, Robert (1992). The First Frigates. London: Conway Maritime Press. ISBN 0851776019.
- Rodger, N. A. M. (1986). The Wooden World: An Anatomy of the Georgian Navy. Annapolis, Maryland: Naval Institute Press. ISBN 0870219871.
- Winfield, Rif (2007). British Warships of the Age of Sail 1714–1792: Design, Construction, Careers and Fates. Seaforth. ISBN 9781844157006.
