= Burntwick Island =

Island in Kent, United Kingdom

- Location within Kent

Geography
- Location: River Medway estuary
- Coordinates: 51.421°N 0.675°E
- Length: 2 km (1.2 mi)
- Width: 1 km (0.6 mi)

Administration
- England
- County: Kent
- Borough: Swale

Demographics
- Population: 0

Burntwick Island is an island in the estuary of the River Medway in Kent, United Kingdom. It is a flat, raised area of marshland around 2 kilometres (1.2 mi) long and 1 kilometre (0.62 mi) wide among the tidal sand banks on the southern side of the estuary and separated from the British mainland of Chetney Marshes by a narrow channel known as Stangate Creek. The island is crossed by several narrow tidal channels that mean that at high tide the island is separated into several smaller islands.

== History ==
Until the 18th century, the island was part of the mainland and formed the northernmost area of the parish of Upchurch. A track that ran from Shoregate Lane at Ham Green can still be traced. In the late 18th and early 19th centuries it was used as a quarantine base for disease-infected ships, with the bodies of those who died usually buried on Deadman's Island 3 kilometres (1.9 mi) to the east. The island was also used for smuggling, particularly after rising customs duties in the late 18th century, with tea and spirits the most commonly smuggled items. In the first years of the 19th century, Burntwick became a hideout of the North Kent Gang, a notorious group of smugglers. In 1820 they were confronted by two blockade officers while unloading goods in Stangate Creek, resulting in serious injury to one of the officers and the escape of the perpetrators. The majority of the fifty-strong group were eventually captured with three executed on Penenden Heath near Maidstone and a further fifteen transported to Tasmania. The abolition of import duties in 1831 largely ended the practice of smuggling in the area.

In 1845 the crew of the naval ship HMS Eclair contracted yellow fever and HMS Rolla was sent to assist. The surgeon of Rolla, Sidney Bernard, moved to Eclair to treat the crew. On the ship's return to England, the authorities ordered the captain to moor in Stangate Creek to avoid spread of the disease and a cutter was deployed to prevent anyone leaving the ship. Bernard continued to tend to the crew until he also caught it and died aged 27 on 9 October 1845. He was buried on Burntwick Island and his grave, isolated among the marshy grasslands, is still visible.

The remains of a small house are also still visible on the island, home in the 1840s of shepherd James Woolley and his wife Sarah, and later home to Thomas Hoare and Emma Castleton from the 1870s. In the early 20th century, the tide began to flood the island and the sheep were removed to the mainland. Also in the 19th century, the island was used as a refuse dump and much of the ground there is still littered with Victorian pottery and glass.

The island then became the property of the Ministry of Defence and a battery was built there, later joined by a torpedo school and barracks during the Second World War. Since then it has been largely unused, becoming an important haven for seabirds, and is frequently fully submerged by the tide.
