= Sir John Hamilton, 1st Baronet, of Marlborough House =

Royal Navy officer and baronet (1726–1784)

Captain Sir John Hamilton Bt
- Born: 21 February 1726
- Died: 24 January 1784 (aged 57)
- Spouse: Cassandra Agnes Chamberlayne (m. 1763–1784)
- Children: Sir Charles Hamilton; Sir Edward Hamilton
- Military career
- Allegiance: Kingdom of Great Britain
- Branch: Royal Navy
- Service years: 1740–1784
- Rank: Captain
- Commands: HMS Cormorant; HMS Zephyr; HMS Merlin; HMS Active; HMS Lizard; HMS Hector; HMS Grafton
- Conflicts: War of Jenkins' Ear; Battle of Cartagena de Indias; Invasion of Cuba; Seven Years' War; American Revolutionary War; Siege of Quebec; Battle of Ushant

Sir John Hamilton, 1st Baronet (21 February 1726 – 24 January 1784) was a Royal Navy officer of the eighteenth century. He joined as a captain's servant in HMS Rippon in 1740. Hamilton fought in the War of Jenkins' Ear at the Battle of Cartagena de Indias in 1741 and then transferred to HMS Alderney where he participated in the unsuccessful Invasion of Cuba. He was promoted to midshipman in HMS Success in 1742, and was promoted to lieutenant while serving on HMS Tartar in 1747. Having served in a variety of ships as a lieutenant, Hamilton was promoted to commander in 1762. After initially commanding HMS Cormorant he served in HMS Zephyr and HMS Merlin on the Newfoundland Station before being promoted to post captain in 1766.

Given command of HMS Lizard to serve in the American Revolutionary War, Hamilton sailed to North America in 1775 and in December fought on land at the Siege of Quebec. For his service there he was made a baronet in 1776, and received command of the brand new ship of the line HMS Hector. He fought in her at the Battle of Ushant in 1778 before in 1780 sailing to the West Indies, where in October Hector was dismasted in the Great Hurricane of 1780. He left Hector in 1782 and was given command of HMS Grafton to sail as a reinforcement to the East Indies Station. In January 1783 the squadron of ships he was sailing with were all dismasted in the Bay of Biscay and forced to turn home. He then returned to command Hector as a guardship at Portsmouth. With his health deteriorating from yellow fever, he resigned his command on 22 January 1784 and died two days later.

== Early life ==
John Hamilton was born on 21 February 1726, the son of John Hamilton and Mary née Wright. He had one sister, Mary, who was born in 1728. The family was an ancient one, having come across from Normandy with William the Conqueror in 1066, and was related to the Earls of Leicester, Lords Hamilton, and Earls of Abercorn.

== Naval career ==
=== Early career ===
Hamilton joined the Royal Navy as a captain's servant in the 60-gun fourth rate HMS Rippon on 22 September 1740. Rippon sailed to the West Indies in the fleet of Rear-Admiral Sir Chaloner Ogle. Hamilton saw his first action on 7 January 1741 when, during the War of Jenkins' Ear, the squadron Rippon was a part of indecisively engaged a similarly sized French squadron in the mistaken belief that they were Spanish. He then fought at the unsuccessful Battle of Cartagena de Indias between 4 March and 20 May of the same year. On 4 July he was transferred as an able seaman to the 8-gun bomb vessel HMS Alderney to serve at the Invasion of Cuba from August, and then on 10 October he moved again; this time to the 24-gun frigate HMS Success.

Hamilton was promoted to midshipman in Success on 14 October 1742, serving at New England and later off Lisbon, before he left that ship on 8 May 1743 to become quarter gunner on board the 90-gun ship of the line HMS Princess Royal in home waters. By 9 December of the same year he was registered as an unrated member of the crew of the 20-gun frigate HMS Bideford, in which he sailed to the West Indies on 29 January 1744. He returned to his previous rank of midshipman on board the 20-gun frigate HMS Tartar, in which he served off South Carolina, on 16 May, before being promoted to acting lieutenant in the same ship on 5 January 1745/6. His rank was made permanent on 11 January 1747, Hamilton having passed the relevant examination on 6 February 1746.

On 1 February 1747 he left Tartar, which was undergoing a refit at Deptford, to become second lieutenant of the 50-gun fourth rate HMS Winchester. He served on board her until 21 August 1749 when Winchester was paid off, and did not receive another appointment until 6 February 1755 when he was made third lieutenant of the 90-gun ship of the line HMS Ramillies, serving in the Downs. On 7 October of the same year he moved from Ramillies to the 50-gun fourth rate HMS Colchester, where he became her first lieutenant. The Seven Years' War having begun, Hamilton participated in an action between Colchester, the 28-gun frigate HMS Lyme, and two French warships of an equivalent size off Oléron on 17 May 1756. After around six hours of fighting both sides were so heavily damaged that when they parted neither was capable of chasing the other.

In March 1757 and March 1758 Colchester served as a convoy escort to East India Company ships arriving at St Helena, and then in 1759 she joined the fleet of Admiral Sir Edward Hawke, serving at the blockade of Port Louis between August and September. Hamilton stayed in Colchester until 25 January 1760 when he was moved to become first lieutenant of the 44-gun frigate HMS Prince Edward. On 24 June 1761 Prince Edward sailed to the Levant as a convoy escort, and after returning she was paid off in 1762. From Prince Edward he was then transferred to the 84-gun ship of the line HMS Royal William on 26 January 1762 to serve as her second lieutenant on the blockade of the Basque Roads, however this appointment did not last long; on 7 April of the same year Hamilton was promoted to commander.

=== Command ===
Hamilton was given his first command at the same time, that being the 8-gun fireship HMS Cormorant, in which he served until 13 December when Cormorant was paid off. He was then given command of the 10-gun sloop HMS Zephyr on 11 April 1764; he sailed her to Newfoundland in May, before transferring from her into the newly converted 18-gun sloop HMS Merlin on 8 February 1766. He returned to Newfoundland in her on 15 April, and served there until 26 May 1768 when he was promoted to post captain.

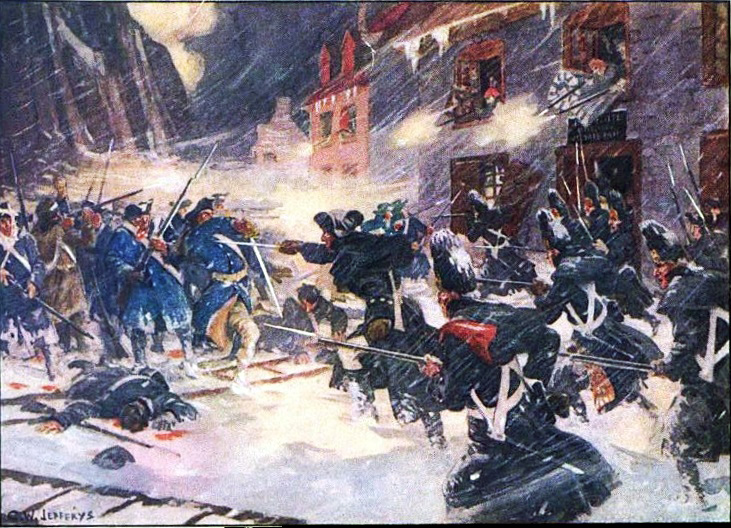
Street fighting during the Siege of Quebec

As his first command as a post captain, Hamilton was given the 28-gun frigate HMS Active and he commanded her until 21 March 1771, although she did not see active service in this time. Hamilton spent the next four years on half pay before being ordered to take command of the 28-gun frigate HMS Lizard on 20 June 1775 after the start of the American Revolutionary War. He sailed to North America on 16 August to serve on the St. Lawrence River and transport funds to the garrison of New York. At the Siege of Quebec in December Hamilton landed Lizard's guns and stores ashore to assist in the defence, and then took command of a battalion of seamen in the battle itself, greatly contributing to the success of the battle.

Hamilton was given the dispatches of General Guy Carleton, the Governor of Quebec, on the successful defeat of the siege, to take home. He took passage on the 10-gun sloop HMS Hunter. For his services in the siege and in bringing the dispatches home, Hamilton received the thanks of parliament and was made a baronet on 6 June 1776. He relinquished command of Lizard on 12 June, and took command of the brand new 74-gun ship of the line HMS Hector twenty-one days later. He joined the Channel Fleet in December, and fought at the Battle of Ushant on 27 July 1778. Hector was part of Vice-Admiral Sir Robert Harland's van division during the indecisive encounter.

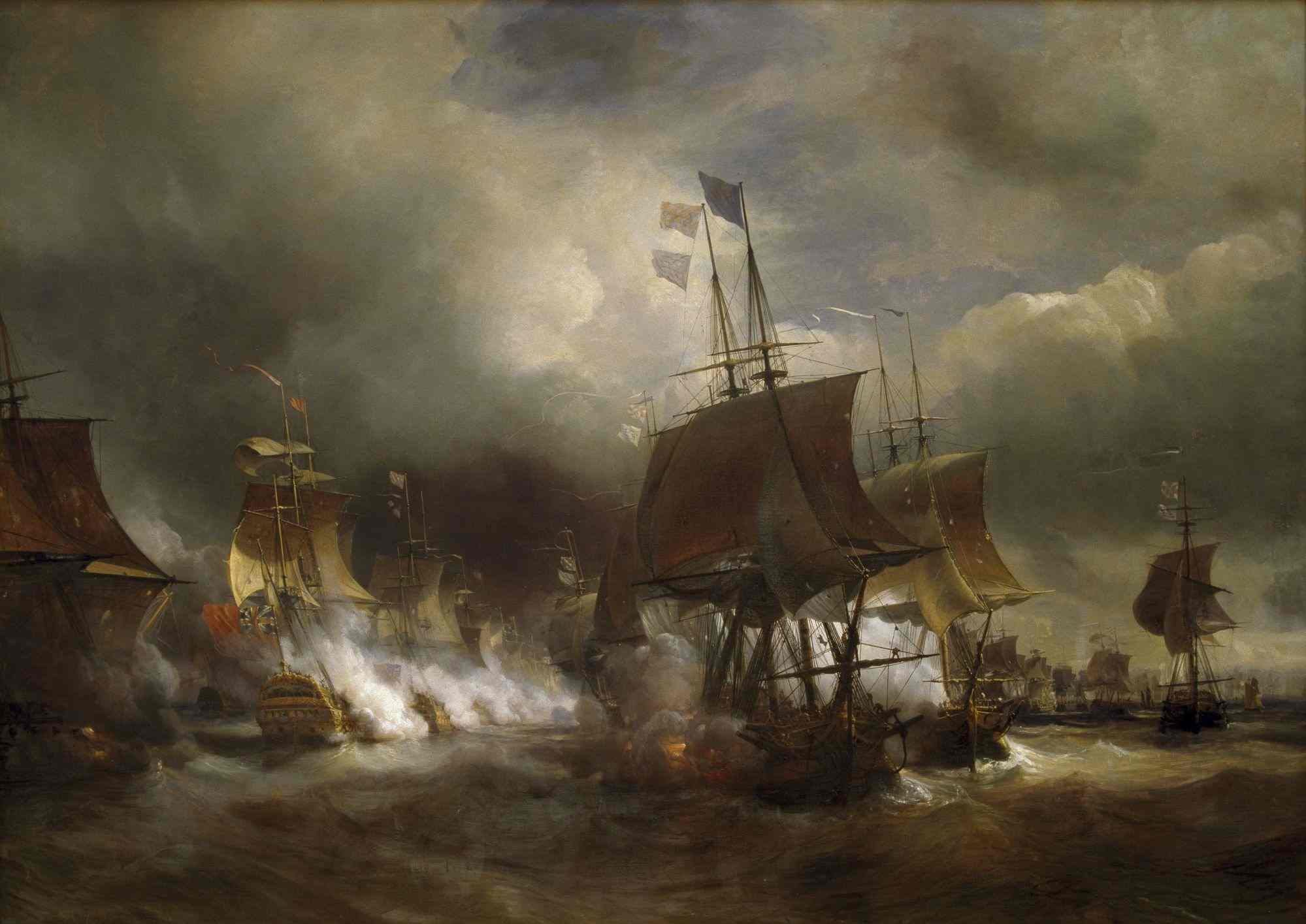
The Battle of Ushant

In 1780 Hamilton sailed with the fleet of Admiral Sir George Rodney to Gibraltar, but was diverted on 15 January to sail to the West Indies as part of a squadron protecting a convoy of over two hundred ships. Hamilton thus missed fighting in the Battle of Cape St. Vincent by a single day. Hector joined the squadron of Rear-Admiral Joshua Rowley stationed at Port Royal in March upon arriving in the West Indies. On 20 June Hector was part of a squadron led by Captain William Cornwallis that encountered a vastly superior force of French ships of the line off Bermuda and successfully kept them at bay throughout the day until they were able to withdraw. In October Rowley's squadron had just completed conveying a convoy of ships from Jamaica when they were caught in the Great Hurricane of 1780; Hector was totally dis-masted in the storm and received a large amount of damage to her upper deck, but Hamilton safely reached Port Royal on 26 October having thrown all but two of his ship's guns overboard to assist in the attempt to stay afloat. He returned home from the West Indies in command of another convoy at the end of the year.

Hamilton continued to command Hector until 27 December 1782 when he was translated into the 74-gun ship of the line HMS Grafton at Spithead. He joined the squadron of Captain Robert Kingsmill intended to reinforce the East Indies Station, and they sailed on 18 January 1783; while sailing through the Bay of Biscay the ships were heavily damaged in storms and after Grafton lost all of her masts she was forced to return home; Grafton was paid off on 4 April. A month later Hamilton returned to Hector, which was serving as a guardship at Portsmouth. (Note: May have previously briefly commanded Grafton as a guardship in 1776.) Hamilton had been for some time suffering from the ill effects of yellow fever likely caught while on one of his many foreign postings; in December he was one of the presiding officers in the court martial of Captain Evelyn Sutton over a dispute with Commodore George Johnstone, and this exertion exacerbated Hamilton's condition. On 22 January 1784 he resigned his command of Hector; he died two days later. (Note: Other sources report his death on 7 January and 31 January.)

== Family ==
Hamilton married Cassandra Agnes Chamberlayne, the daughter of Edmund Chamberlayne of Maugersbury and sister of the future Admiral Charles Chamberlayne, on 4 October 1763. Together they had two sons, both of whom followed their father into the Royal Navy and served with him on Hector:

- Admiral Sir Charles Hamilton, 2nd Baronet KCB (1767–1849), inherited his father's baronetcy upon his death
- Admiral Sir Edward Hamilton, 1st Baronet KCB (1772–1851), was awarded his own baronetcy in 1819

== Notes and citations ==
=== Citations ===
Baronetage of Great Britain
Preceded by New creation	Baronet (of Marlborough House); 1776–1784	Succeeded by Charles Hamilton
