= Robin Chichester-Clark =

British politician (1928–2016)

Sir Robert Chichester-Clark
- Chichester-Clark in 1962

Minister of State for Employment
- In office 7 April 1972 – 4 March 1974
- Prime Minister: Edward Heath
- Preceded by: Paul Bryan
- Succeeded by: Albert Booth

Member of Parliament for Londonderry
- In office 26 May 1955 – 8 February 1974
- Preceded by: William Wellwood
- Succeeded by: William Ross

Personal details
- Born: 10 January 1928 Castledawson, County Londonderry
- Died: 5 August 2016 (aged 88) Burnham Overy, Norfolk, England
- Resting place: Yarlington, Somerset, England
- Party: Ulster Unionist
- Spouse(s): Jane Helen Goddard (m. 1953; div. 1972) Caroline Bull (m. 1974)
- Parents: James Lenox-Conyngham Clark (father); Marion Caroline Dehra Chichester (mother)
- Relatives: James Chichester-Clark (brother); Penelope Chichester-Clark (sister); Dehra Parker (maternal grandmother); Robert Chichester (maternal grandfather); Emma Chichester Clark (daughter)
- Education: Royal Naval College
- Alma mater: Magdalene College, Cambridge

Sir Robert "Robin" Chichester-Clark (10 January 1928 – 5 August 2016) was a British politician who served as a Member of Parliament for Londonderry from 1955 until February 1974, and to date was the last MP representing a seat in Northern Ireland to be a British government minister.

== Early life ==
Chichester-Clark was born at Moyola Park, Castledawson, County Londonderry, his family's ancestral home. He was the eldest of three children of James J. Lenox-Conyngham Clark and Marion Caroline Dehra, née Chichester. His brother was James Chichester-Clark and his sister was Penelope Hobhouse, the garden writer and historian. In 1924, his father changed the family name to Chichester-Clark by deed poll, thus preventing the old ascendancy name Chichester (his wife's maiden name) from dying out. On his mother's side the family are descended from the Donegall Chichesters and were the heirs of the Dawsons of Castledawson, who had originally held Moyola Park.

He was educated at the Royal Naval College, Dartmouth and Magdalene College, Cambridge. He began work as a journalist in 1949, worked as public relations officer for Glyndebourne 1952–3, before joining the publishing house Oxford University Press.

== Political life ==
Chichester-Clark was elected for Londonderry at the 1955 general election. He was the third generation of politicians from his family. His grandfather, Robert Chichester, represented South Londonderry at the Imperial Parliament at Westminster; his grandmother, Dame Dehra Parker, and father were both members of the Parliament of Northern Ireland. His brother, Major James Chichester-Clark, was Prime Minister of Northern Ireland from 1969 to 1971, but resigned in the face of increasing violence and internal Ulster Unionist Party splits. The family were also active in politics in the 19th century and Chichester-Clark's great-great-grandfather, The Rt. Hon. George Robert Dawson, was Member of Parliament for Londonderry, later for an English constituency, before joining the government of Sir Robert Peel, whose sister Mary he married. They lived at Castledawson.

Chichester-Clark was consistently either a Front Bench Spokesman for the Opposition or a member of the Government of Harold Macmillan and, later, Edward Heath. He held the position of Assistant Government Whip, Lord Commissioner of the Treasury, Comptroller of the Household, was Conservative Spokesman for Northern Ireland and on the Arts, Shadow Minister of Public Building and Works and, ultimately, Minister of State for Employment. In 1970 he remained outside the UK government because of the Premiership of his brother in Northern Ireland. When Edward Heath suspended the Stormont Government and Parliament in 1972, he asked Chichester-Clark to go with William Whitelaw to Northern Ireland as Minister of State. Chichester-Clark did not accept but later joined the administration as Minister of State for Employment. Before the February 1974 election he announced his retirement from the Londonderry constituency and did not put himself forward for reselection.

== Later life ==
From 1974 he worked as a director of companies in the construction industry, as a political adviser to the NFBTE, as a management consultant and as chairman of the medical research charity RAFT (www.raft.ac.uk) and The Arvon Foundation. He also helped with fundraising for the Royal Philharmonic Orchestra and with the development of the Museum of Illustration. Chichester-Clark was interviewed in 2012 and 2014 as part of The History of Parliament's oral history project.

== Personal life ==
He was first married to Jane Helen Goddard, daughter of Air Marshall Sir Robert Victor Goddard, KCB, CB. They married in 1953 and had three children, Emma, Mark and Sophia; they divorced in 1972. His second wife was the barrister Caroline Bull, daughter of the transport executive Anthony Bull. They married in 1974 and had two sons; Adam and Thomas. He owned homes in Fulham, London, and Yarlington, Somerset.

During a holiday in Burnham Overy, Norfolk, Chichester-Clark died from a stroke on 5 August 2016, at the age of 88. He was buried near his home in Yarlington.

== Ancestors ==
8. James Johnston Clark
4. James Jackson Clark of Largantogher, Co. Londonderry
2. James Clark
20. William Lenox-Conyngham
10. Sir William Fitzwilliam Lenox-Conyngham
21. Charlotte Melosina Staples of Lissan House
5. Elizabeth Mary Lenox-Conyngham
22. George Arbuthnot (d.3/11/1843)
11. Laura Arbuthnot
23. Elizabeth Fraser
1. Robin Chichester-Clark
24. Edward Chichester, 4th Marquess of Donegall
12. Lord Adolphus Chichester
25. Amelia Spread Deane Grady
6. Robert Chichester
26. Col. Robert Peel Dawson
13. Mary Dawson of Castledawson
3. Marion Caroline Dehra Chichester
14. James Kerr-Fisher
7. Dehra Kerr-Fisher
15. Annie Kerr-Forsythe

Parliament of the United Kingdom
Preceded by William Wellwood	Member of Parliament for Londonderry; 1955–1974	Succeeded by William Ross
