= Penelope Hobhouse =

British garden writer, designer, lecturer and television presenter (born 1929)

Penelope Hobhouse MBE
- Born: Penelope Chichester-Clark; 20 November 1929 (age 96); Moyola Park, Castledawson, Northern Ireland
- Occupations: Garden writer, designer
- Spouse(s): Paul Rodbard Hobhouse (m. 1952; div. 1983); John Melville Malins (m. 1983; died 1992)
- Children: 3
- Parent(s): James Lenox-Conyngham Chichester-Clark; Marion Chichester
- Relatives: The Baron Moyola (brother); Sir Robin Chichester-Clark (brother); Dame Dehra Parker (grandmother)

Penelope Hobhouse MBE (née Chichester-Clark; born 20 November 1929) is a British garden writer, designer, lecturer and television presenter.

== Early life ==
Born into an Anglo-Irish family in Moyola Park, Castledawson, she is the daughter of James Lenox-Conyngham Chichester-Clark and Marion Caroline Dehra Chichester (1904-1976). She is also the sister of Lord Moyola, the Prime Minister of Northern Ireland from 1969 to 1971, and Sir Robin Chichester-Clark.

She was educated at North Foreland Lodge and Girton College, Cambridge, graduating with a BA in economics in 1951.

== Career ==
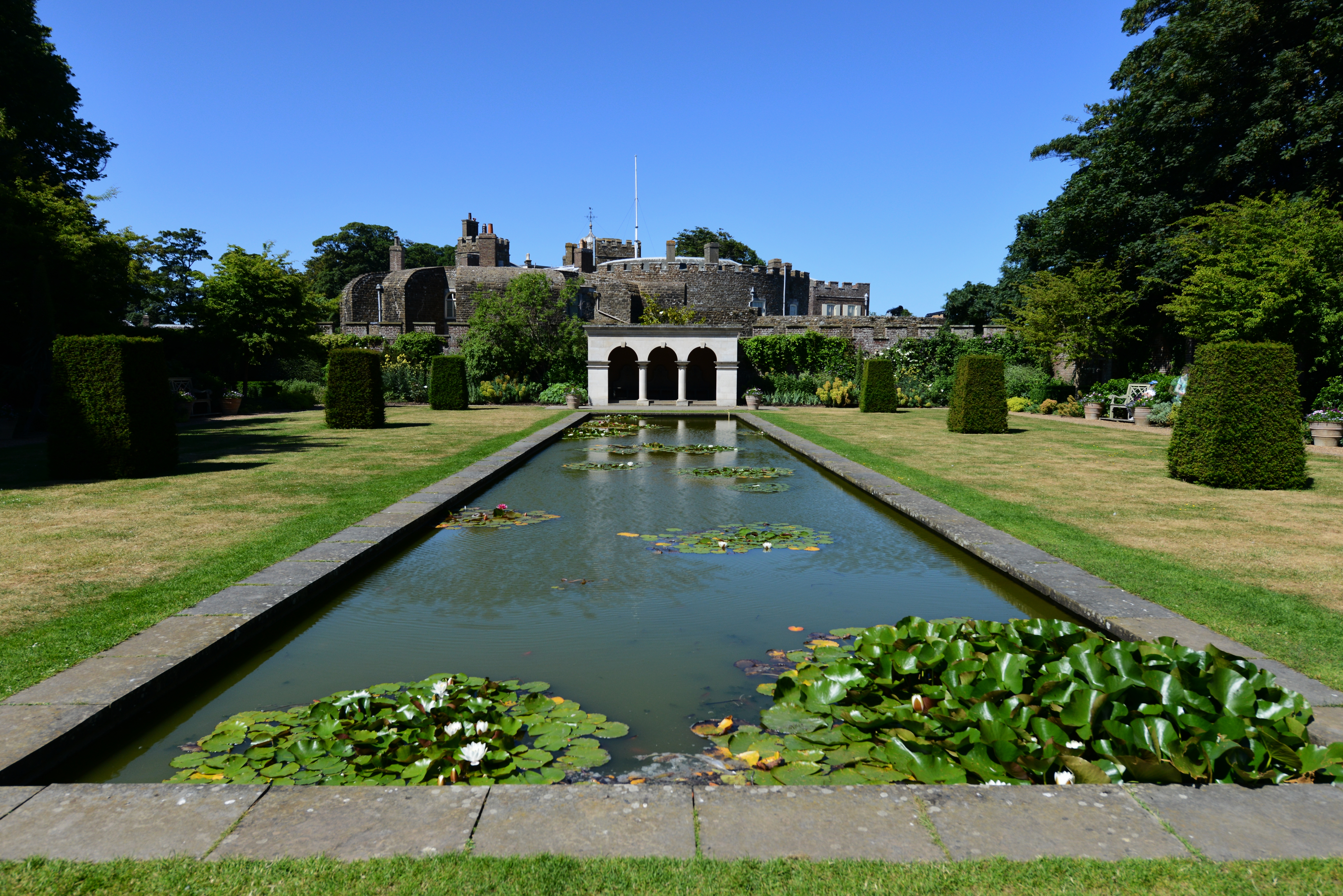
The Queen Mother's garden in Walmer Castle, designed by Hobhouse in 1997

Hobhouse walked through Tuscany and taught herself gardening by examples of the Tuscan villa gardens she saw; she went on to be a garden writer and designer, publishing many books on the subject. She started work at Hadspen House, Somerset until leaving in 1979.

In 1980 she and her husband Prof John Malins moved into Tintinhull Gardens. The garden's former designer Phyllis Reiss was said to have had a strong influence of Hobhouse. Until 1993, she was in charge of Tintinhull House's gardens also in Somerset.

In 1996 she hosted a television series for Home & Garden Television in the USA. Her publications include; Colour in Your Garden, Plants in Garden History, Penelope Hobhouse on Gardening, Penelope Hobhouse's Garden Designs, and Penelope Hobhouse's Natural Planting.

Hobhouse is "a fixture in the minds of gardeners who love rooms and bones – the paths and walls and satisfying verticals that form the skeleton of a garden."

She has designed gardens in England, Scotland, France, Italy, Spain, Germany and the United States. They include a garden for Queen Elizabeth The Queen Mother, at Walmer Castle in Kent, 'The Country Garden' for the Royal Horticultural Society at Wisley, a renaissance-style garden in Italy, the Upper Walled Garden at Aberglasney, in Carmarthenshire, a herb garden for the New York Botanical Garden, and a garden for the fashion designer, Jil Sander, in Germany. In 1958, in Taormina, she introduced new botanical species, which still exist today, to the botanical garden of Casa Cuseni, for Daphne Phelps, purchasing ancient plants and seeds from the Allegra Gardens in Catania. In 1996, she designed an English cottage garden for Steve Jobs' Woodside home, a perfect fit for Tudor-style architecture.

She is an associate editor of Gardens Illustrated magazine. She has taught at the University of Essex. She then lived in Bettiscombe, Dorset until 2008. She moved in September 2008 back to Hadspen, where she started a new garden outside her quarters which are in the yard. Her new garden is a south facing and 17 m × 17 m (56 ft × 56 ft) enclosure at the back of some converted stables surrounded by mature box hedging.

== Family ==
Hobhouse married firstly, 17 May 1952 Paul Rodbard Hobhouse (d 1994), son of Sir Arthur Hobhouse (d 1965), of Castle Cary, Somerset; this marriage was dissolved in 1983, and she left the garden she had restored at the Hobhouse seat, Hadspen, Somerset. They had one daughter, Georgina Catherine, and two sons, Niall Alexander and David Paul. She moved to Tintinhull and met her second husband, John Melville Malins, at a Garden History Society meeting; they married in 1983, he died in 1992.

== Awards and honours ==
- Award of Excellence for her book, Gardening Through the Ages from the Garden Writers Association of America in 1993
- Royal Horticultural Society Victoria Medal of Honour, the highest award given by the RHS to British Horticulturists in December 1996.
- Life Time Achievement Award from the Guild of Garden Writers in November 1999
- Honorary degree from Birmingham University
- Lifetime Achievement Award from the Society of Garden Designers in January 2020.

She was appointed Member of the Order of the British Empire (MBE) in the 2014 Birthday Honours for services to British gardening.

A variety of Oenothera was named after her, called Oenothera 'Penelope Hobhouse'.

== Selected works ==
- Hobhouse, Penelope; Edwards, Ambra (2020). The Story of Gardening (US ed.). Hudson, N.Y.: Princeton Architectural Press. ISBN 9781616899196.
