= Robert Bateson =

Robert Bateson may refer to:

- Sir Robert Bateson, 1st Baronet (1782–1863), British MP for Londonderry 1830–1842
- Robert Bateson (politician) (1816–1843), his son, British MP for Londonderry 1842–1843
- Robert Bateson (RAF officer) (1912–1986), Royal Air Force officer
- Bob Bateson (born 1961), American football player

== See also ==
- Bateson (surname)
