= Limavady Area B =

District electoral areas in Limavady, Northern Ireland

Limavady Area B was one of the three district electoral areas in Limavady, Northern Ireland which existed from 1973 to 1985. The district elected five members to Limavady Borough Council, and formed part of the Londonderry constituencies for the Northern Ireland Assembly and UK Parliament.

It was created for the 1973 local elections, and contained the wards of Dungiven, Feeny, Forest, The Highlands and Upper Glenshane. It was abolished for the 1985 local elections and replaced by the Benbradagh DEA.

== Councillors ==
Election	Councillor (Party)	Councillor (Party)	Councillor (Party)	Councillor (Party)	Councillor (Party)
1981	David Robinson (UUP)	Max Gault (UUP)/ (United Unionist)	Denis Farren (Independent)	Lawrence Hegarty (SDLP)	Sean McCloskey (IIP)
1977	David Robinson (UUP)	Max Gault (UUP)/ (United Unionist)	Denis Farren (Independent)	Raymond Brady (SDLP)	Joseph McLaughlin (SDLP)
1973	William Ross (United Unionist)	Max Gault (UUP)/ (United Unionist)	Denis Farren (Independent)	Raymond Brady (SDLP)	Perry O'Connor (SDLP)

== 1981 Election ==
1977: 2 x UUP, 2 x SDLP, 1 x Independent

1981: 2 x UUP, 1 x SDLP, 1 x IIP, 1 x Independent

1977-1981 Change: IIP gain from SDLP

Limavady Area B - 5 seats
Party	Candidate	FPv%	Count							
Party	Candidate	FPv%	1	2	3	4	5	6	7	8
UUP	David Robinson*	24.56%	883							
SDLP	Lawrence Hegarty	15.88%	571	571.32	591.32	592.32	613.32			
UUP	Max Gault*	9.15%	329	554.28	554.28	569.28	569.28	569.28	805.28	
Independent	Denis Farren*	13.94%	501	504.52	510.52	511.52	518.84	535.84	545.88	559.88
Irish Independence	Sean McCloskey	8.87%	319	319.96	329.96	329.96	383.96	537.96	537.96	537.96
SDLP	James Brolly	8.62%	310	310	319	320.64	325.64	372.64	373.64	375.64
DUP	Alex Fulton	6.12%	220	256.8	256.8	324.32	324.32	324.32		
Irish Independence	George McCormick	5.48%	197	197	203	203	237			
Irish Independence	Andrew Murphy	3.53%	127	127.96	138.96	138.96				
DUP	John McKay	2.09%	75	87.48	87.48					
Republican Clubs	Jerry Mullan	1.75%	63	63.32						
Electorate: 5,007 Valid: 3,595 (71.80%) Spoilt: 120 Quota: 600 Turnout: 3,715 (74.20%)

== 1977 Election ==
1973: 2 x United Unionist, 2 x SDLP, 1 x Independent

1977: 2 x UUP, 2 x SDLP, 1 x Independent

1973-1977 Change: UUP (two seats) gain from United Unionist

Limavady Area B - 5 seats
Party	Candidate	FPv%	Count					
Party	Candidate	FPv%	1	2	3	4	5	6
UUP	David Robinson	20.62%	627					
SDLP	Raymond Brady*	17.92%	545					
Independent	Denis Farren*	16.18%	492	494.47	494.85	535.85		
UUP	Max Gault*	11.84%	360	447.02	504.09	504.09	504.09	504.69
SDLP	Joseph McLaughlin	9.40%	286	286.19	288.38	304.38	444.57	481.77
DUP	John McKay	12.43%	378	392.44	400.53	401.72	401.72	401.82
SDLP	James Brolly	5.69%	173	173.19	173.38	211.38		
Republican Clubs	James McLaughlin	3.98%	121	121	122.19			
UUP	William Scott	1.94%	59	72.49				
Electorate: 5,110 Valid: 3,041 (59.51%) Spoilt: 134 Quota: 507 Turnout: 3,175 (62.13%)

== 1973 Election ==
1973: 2 x United Unionist, 2 x SDLP, 1 x Independent

Limavady Area B - 5 seats
Party	Candidate	FPv%	Count							
Party	Candidate	FPv%	1	2	3	4	5	6	7	8
United Unionist	William Ross	21.73%	836							
United Unionist	Max Gault	20.17%	776							
SDLP	Raymond Brady	8.37%	322	322	323	334	439	457	664	
SDLP	Perry O'Connor	10.24%	394	394	398	407	469	500	600	618.8
Independent	Denis Farren	6.58%	253	352	376	420	429	518	543	543.5
Republican Clubs	A. D. Hegarty	11.05%	425	425	425	427	438	494	534	534.8
SDLP	James Mulhern	8.47%	326	326	326	328	355	391		
Independent	James McLaughlin	5.98%	230	243	245	263	268			
SDLP	Vincent McMacken	5.67%	218	219	219	222				
Alliance	Neil Strouts	1.74%	67	111	138					
Electorate: 5,059 Valid: 3,847 (76.04%) Spoilt: 57 Quota: 642 Turnout: 3,904 (77.17%)
