= 1973 Limavady District Council election =

Local government election in Northern Ireland

1973 Limavady Borough Council election
30 May 1973	1977 →

All 15 seats to Limavady Borough Council 8 seats needed for a majority
	First party	Second party	Third party
Party	United Unionist	SDLP	Alliance
Seats won	8	4	2
	Fourth party
Party	Independent
Seats won	1

Elections to Limavady Borough Council were held on 30 May 1973 on the same day as the other Northern Irish local government elections. The election used three district electoral areas to elect a total of 15 councillors.

== Election results ==
Party	Seats	±	First Pref. votes	FPv%	±%
United Unionist	8		5,535	47.6%	
SDLP	4		3,485	30.0%	
Alliance	2		1,305	11.2%	
Independent	1		810	7.0%	
Republican Clubs	0		483	4.1%	
Totals	15		11,618	100.0%	—

== Districts summary ==
Results of the Limavady Borough Council election, 1973 by district
Ward	%	Cllrs	%	Cllrs	%	Cllrs	Total Cllrs
Ward	SDLP		Alliance		Others		Total Cllrs
Area A	37.5	2	14.3	1	48.2	3	6
Area B	32.8	2	1.7	0	65.5	3	5
Area C	18.1	0	17.8	1	64.1	3	4
Total	30.0	4	11.2	2	58.8	9	15

== Districts results ==
=== Area A ===
1973: 3 x United Unionist, 2 x SDLP, 1 x Alliance

Limavady Area A - 6 seats
Party	Candidate	FPv%	Count								
Party	Candidate	FPv%	1	2	3	4	5	6	7	8	9
United Unionist	Florence Sloan	16.40%	690								
United Unionist	Robert Grant	15.11%	636								
SDLP	Michael Nicholas	14.64%	616								
United Unionist	James Gilfillan	13.95%	587	667.76							
Alliance	James Boylan	7.03%	296	296.12	297.2	302.8	305.04	305.16	341.46	341.5	558.72
SDLP	Eddie McGowan	7.89%	332	332	332	332	332	335.76	359.24	519.5	539.68
SDLP	Arthur Doherty	10.41%	438	438	438	438.4	438.4	439.66	475.06	506.72	526.34
Alliance	J. Barr	5.82%	245	245.48	252.32	270.32	281.08	281.54	315.98	322.1	
SDLP	Donal Morgan	4.54%	191	191	191	191	192	197.08	203.28		
Independent	Rosalind Deighan	1.35%	57	57.12	57.12	58.32	59.32	60.04			
Republican Clubs	P. J. Loughrey	1.38%	58	58	58	58.4	59.4	59.98			
Alliance	Bill Cunningham	1.12%	47	47.6	48.08	52.08	54.96	55.08			
Alliance	Desmond Wallace	0.36%	15	15.6	16.68	20.28					
Electorate: 5,298 Valid: 4,208 (79.43%) Spoilt: 40 Quota: 602 Turnout: 4,248 (80.18%)

=== Area B ===
1973: 2 x United Unionist, 2 x SDLP, 1 x Independent

Limavady Area B - 5 seats
Party	Candidate	FPv%	Count							
Party	Candidate	FPv%	1	2	3	4	5	6	7	8
United Unionist	William Ross	21.73%	836							
United Unionist	Max Gault	20.17%	776							
SDLP	Raymond Brady	8.37%	322	322	323	334	439	457	664	
SDLP	Perry O'Connor	10.24%	394	394	398	407	469	500	600	618.8
Independent	Denis Farren	6.58%	253	352	376	420	429	518	543	543.5
Republican Clubs	A. D. Hegarty	11.05%	425	425	425	427	438	494	534	534.8
SDLP	James Mulhern	8.47%	326	326	326	328	355	391		
Independent	James McLaughlin	5.98%	230	243	245	263	268			
SDLP	Vincent McMacken	5.67%	218	219	219	222				
Alliance	Neil Strouts	1.74%	67	111	138					
Electorate: 5,059 Valid: 3,847 (76.04%) Spoilt: 57 Quota: 642 Turnout: 3,904 (77.17%)

=== Area C ===
1973: 3 x United Unionist, 1 x Alliance

Limavady Area C - 4 seats
Party	Candidate	FPv%	Count						
Party	Candidate	FPv%	1	2	3	4	5	6	7
United Unionist	William Barbour	23.97%	854						
United Unionist	Ronald Nicholl	18.78%	669	707.08	707.24	707.24	781.24		
United Unionist	Stanley Gault	13.67%	487	575.48	576.48	576.48	628.52	671.52	701.32
Alliance	William Archibald	7.72%	275	277.24	282.24	325.24	385.04	394.04	695.52
SDLP	Jim Tierney	16.62%	592	592.16	637.16	653.16	668.16	668.16	690.16
Alliance	Brian Brown	7.66%	273	274.44	275.44	301.44	361.76	371.76	
Independent	Alastair Smyth	4.21%	150	152.08	154.08	157.24			
Independent	C. G. H. Charlton	3.37%	120	123.36	123.36	123.36			
Alliance	Syd Houghton	2.44%	87	87.16	88.16				
SDLP	Shaun Burke	1.57%	56	56.16					
Electorate: 4,322 Valid: 3,563 (82.44%) Spoilt: 41 Quota: 713 Turnout: 3,604 (83.39%)
