= Limavady Area A =

District electoral areas in Limavady, Northern Ireland

Limavady Area A was one of the three district electoral areas in Limavady, Northern Ireland which existed from 1973 to 1985. The district elected six members to Limavady Borough Council, and formed part of the Londonderry constituencies for the Northern Ireland Assembly and UK Parliament.

It was created for the 1973 local elections, and contained the wards of Aghanloo, Glack, Gresteel, Magilligan, Myroe and Walworth. It was abolished for the 1985 local elections and replaced by the Bellarena DEA.

== Councillors ==
Election	Councillor (Party)	Councillor (Party)	Councillor (Party)	Councillor (Party)	Councillor (Party)	Councillor (Party)
1981	Ernest Murray (DUP)	Robert Grant (UUP)/ (United Unionist)	Stanley Gault (UUP)	Roy King (SDLP)	Thomas Mullan (SDLP)	Arthur Doherty (SDLP)
1977	Ernest Murray (DUP)	Robert Grant (UUP)/ (United Unionist)	Florence Sloan (UUP)/ (United Unionist)	Michael Nicholas (SDLP)	Thomas Mullan (SDLP)	Arthur Doherty (SDLP)
1973	James Gilfillan (United Unionist)	Robert Grant (UUP)/ (United Unionist)	Florence Sloan (UUP)/ (United Unionist)	Michael Nicholas (SDLP)	Eddie McGowan (SDLP)	James Boylan (Alliance)

== 1981 Election ==
1977: 3 x SDLP, 2 x UUP, 1 x DUP

1981: 3 x SDLP, 2 x UUP, 1 x DUP

1977-1981 Change: No change

Limavady Area A - 6 seats
Party	Candidate	FPv%	Count		
Party	Candidate	FPv%	1	2	3
SDLP	Arthur Doherty*	18.60%	727		
SDLP	Roy King	17.35%	678		
DUP	Ernest Murray*	16.73%	654		
UUP	Robert Grant*	14.41%	563		
SDLP	Thomas Mullan*	14.38%	562		
UUP	Stanley Gault	11.11%	434	453	464
UUP	James Gilfillan	7.42%	290	303	317
Electorate: 5,076 Valid: 3,908 (76.99%) Spoilt: 78 Quota: 559 Turnout: 3,986 (78.53%)

== 1977 Election ==
1973: 3 x United Unionist, 2 x SDLP, 1 x Alliance

1977: 3 x SDLP, 2 x UUP, 1 x DUP

1973-1977 Change: UUP (two seats), DUP and SDLP gain from United Unionist (three seats) and Alliance

Limavady Area A - 6 seats
Party	Candidate	FPv%	Count				
Party	Candidate	FPv%	1	2	3	4	5
SDLP	Michael Nicholas*	19.43%	724				
UUP	Robert Grant*	14.81%	552				
SDLP	Thomas Mullan	13.55%	505	510	630.58		
SDLP	Arthur Doherty	10.14%	378	378	439.36	533.86	
UUP	Florence Sloan*	9.63%	359	368	368	368.21	629.21
DUP	Ernest Murray	13.04%	486	488	488.52	488.73	542.73
Alliance	James Boylan*	9.12%	340	383	385.6	386.65	387.65
UUP	Hugh Guthrie	8.59%	320	323	323.26	323.26	
Alliance	Stanley Stewart	1.69%	63				
Electorate: 5,044 Valid: 3,727 (73.89%) Spoilt: 113 Quota: 533 Turnout: 3,840 (76.13%)

== 1973 Election ==
1973: 3 x United Unionist, 2 x SDLP, 1 x Alliance

Limavady Area A - 6 seats
Party	Candidate	FPv%	Count								
Party	Candidate	FPv%	1	2	3	4	5	6	7	8	9
United Unionist	Florence Sloan	16.40%	690								
United Unionist	Robert Grant	15.11%	636								
SDLP	Michael Nicholas	14.64%	616								
United Unionist	James Gilfillan	13.95%	587	667.76							
Alliance	James Boylan	7.03%	296	296.12	297.2	302.8	305.04	305.16	341.46	341.5	558.72
SDLP	Eddie McGowan	7.89%	332	332	332	332	332	335.76	359.24	519.5	539.68
SDLP	Arthur Doherty	10.41%	438	438	438	438.4	438.4	439.66	475.06	506.72	526.34
Alliance	J. Barr	5.82%	245	245.48	252.32	270.32	281.08	281.54	315.98	322.1	
SDLP	Donal Morgan	4.54%	191	191	191	191	192	197.08	203.28		
Independent	Rosalind Deighan	1.35%	57	57.12	57.12	58.32	59.32	60.04			
Republican Clubs	P. J. Loughrey	1.38%	58	58	58	58.4	59.4	59.98			
Alliance	Bill Cunningham	1.12%	47	47.6	48.08	52.08	54.96	55.08			
Alliance	Desmond Wallace	0.36%	15	15.6	16.68	20.28					
Electorate: 5,298 Valid: 4,208 (79.43%) Spoilt: 40 Quota: 602 Turnout: 4,248 (80.18%)
