= Moyola Park =

Estate in County Londonderry, Northern Ireland

Coordinates: 54°47′02″N 6°33′23″W

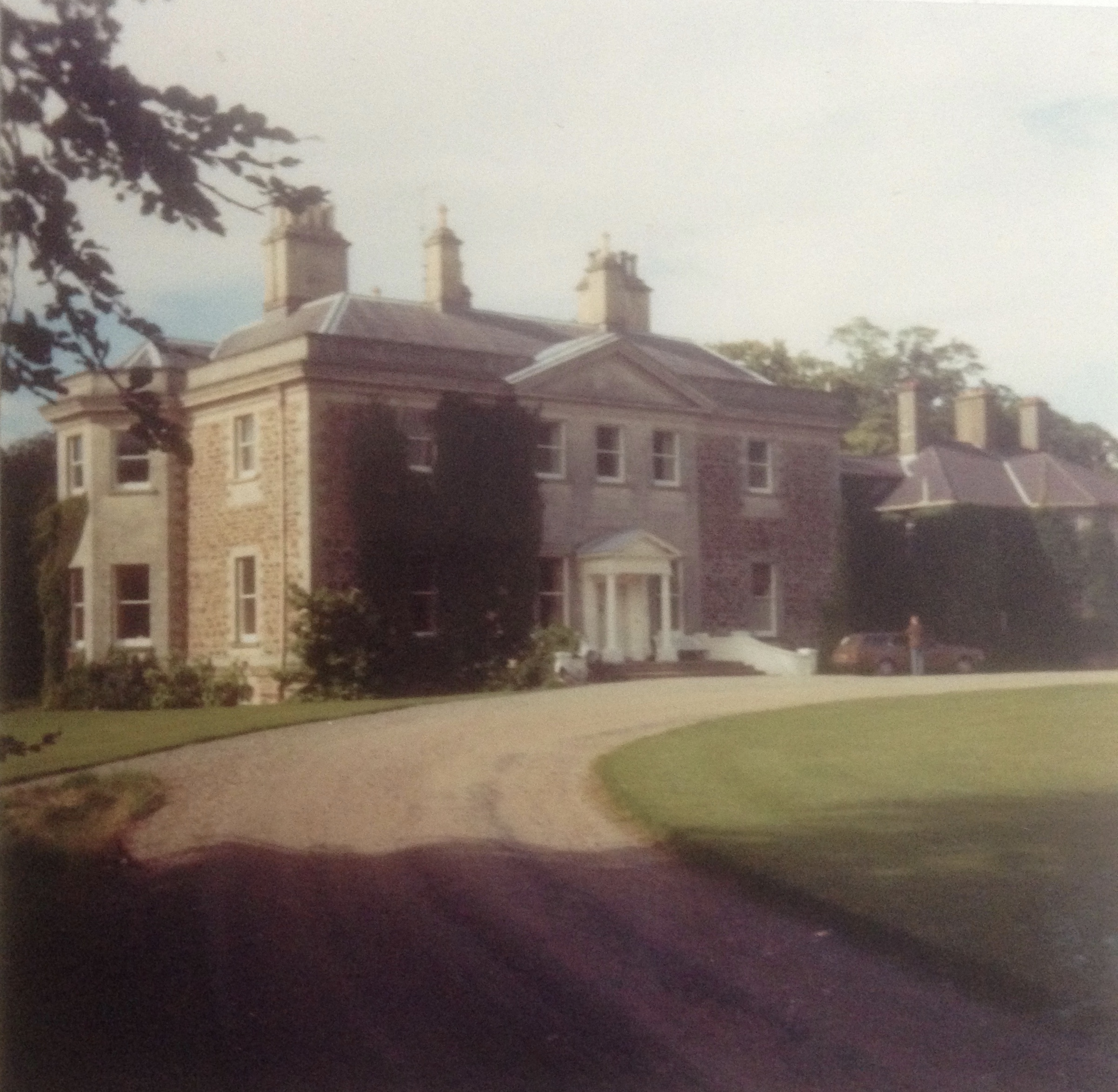
Moyola Park, Front

Moyola Park is a country estate near Castledawson, County Londonderry, Northern Ireland. It was formerly the home of Lady Moyola and Lord Moyola, former Prime Minister of Northern Ireland. The estate is 450 acres (1.8 km^{2}) and is home to Moyola Park Golf Club, which was built by Lord & Lady Moyola. Moyola house was built in 1713 by Joshua Dawson, Chief-Secretary under Queen Anne, who built the Mansion House on Dawson Street, Dublin in 1710. The Mansion House was sold to the Dublin Corporation in 1715, for £3,500, and it has since become the official residence of the Lord Mayor of Dublin.

The Chichester-Clark family are descended from the Dawsons due to the marriage of Mary Dawson and Lord Adolphus Spencer-Churchill Chichester.
