= Limavady Area C =

District electoral areas in Limavady, Northern Ireland

Limavady Area C was one of the three district electoral areas in Limavady, Northern Ireland which existed from 1973 to 1985. The district elected four members to Limavady Borough Council, and formed part of the Londonderry constituencies for the Northern Ireland Assembly and UK Parliament.

It was created for the 1973 local elections, and contained the wards of Binevenagh, Coolessan, Rathbrady and Roeside. It was abolished for the 1985 local elections and replaced by the Limavady Town DEA.

== Councillors ==
Election	Councillor (Party)	Councillor (Party)	Councillor (Party)	Councillor (Party)
1981	William Norris (DUP)	William Barbour (UUP)/ (United Unionist)	William Cooke (UUP)	Barry Doherty (SDLP)
1977	William Norris (DUP)	William Barbour (UUP)/ (United Unionist)	Ronald Nicholl (UUP)/ (United Unionist)	Barry Doherty (SDLP)
1973	Stanley Gault (United Unionist)	William Barbour (UUP)/ (United Unionist)	Ronald Nicholl (UUP)/ (United Unionist)	William Archibald (Alliance)

== 1981 Election ==
1977: 2 x UUP, 1 x SDLP, 1 x DUP

1981: 2 x UUP, 1 x SDLP, 1 x DUP

1977-1981 Change: No change

Limavady Area C - 4 seats
Party	Candidate	FPv%	Count					
Party	Candidate	FPv%	1	2	3	4	5	6
DUP	William Norris*	17.26%	729	776	938			
SDLP	Barry Doherty*	15.46%	653	654	689	689	1,222	
UUP	William Barbour*	14.73%	622	625	679	717.34	721.34	773.34
UUP	William Cooke	15.39%	650	655	699	724.56	727.56	753.56
UUP	John Dolan	14.09%	595	598	628	655.69	659.4	680.4
SDLP	Geraldine Kearney	12.08%	510	510	559	559.71		
Alliance	Francis Parkinson	5.28%	223	223				
DUP	George Robinson	3.15%	133	182				
DUP	Arthur Reid	2.56%	108					
Electorate: 5,426 Valid: 4,223 (77.83%) Spoilt: 64 Quota: 845 Turnout: 4,287 (79.01%)

== 1977 Election ==
1973: 3 x United Unionist, 1 x Alliance

1977: 2 x UUP, 1 x SDLP, 1 x DUP

1973-1977 Change: UUP (two seats), SDLP and DUP gain from United Unionist (three seats) and Alliance

Limavady Area C - 4 seats
Party	Candidate	FPv%	Count					
Party	Candidate	FPv%	1	2	3	4	5	6
SDLP	Barry Doherty	22.97%	817					
UUP	William Barbour*	19.23%	684	688	690.21	1,025.21		
UUP	Ronald Nicholl*	14.48%	515	521	521.68	656.85	918.17	
DUP	William Norris	15.72%	559	559	559.34	588.51	618.59	747.59
Alliance	William Archibald*	9.28%	330	449	545.22	561.22	580.02	655.02
UUP	Stanley Gault*	14.37%	511	519	519.51			
Alliance	Brian Brown	3.96%	141					
Electorate: 5,152 Valid: 3,557 (69.04%) Spoilt: 132 Quota: 712 Turnout: 3,689 (71.60%)

== 1973 Election ==
1973: 3 x United Unionist, 1 x Alliance

Limavady Area C - 4 seats
Party	Candidate	FPv%	Count						
Party	Candidate	FPv%	1	2	3	4	5	6	7
United Unionist	William Barbour	23.97%	854						
United Unionist	Ronald Nicholl	18.78%	669	707.08	707.24	707.24	781.24		
United Unionist	Stanley Gault	13.67%	487	575.48	576.48	576.48	628.52	671.52	701.32
Alliance	William Archibald	7.72%	275	277.24	282.24	325.24	385.04	394.04	695.52
SDLP	Jim Tierney	16.62%	592	592.16	637.16	653.16	668.16	668.16	690.16
Alliance	Brian Brown	7.66%	273	274.44	275.44	301.44	361.76	371.76	
Independent	Alastair Smyth	4.21%	150	152.08	154.08	157.24			
Independent	C. G. H. Charlton	3.37%	120	123.36	123.36	123.36			
Alliance	Syd Houghton	2.44%	87	87.16	88.16				
SDLP	Shaun Burke	1.57%	56	56.16					
Electorate: 4,322 Valid: 3,563 (82.44%) Spoilt: 41 Quota: 713 Turnout: 3,604 (83.39%)
