= 1981 Limavady District Council election =

Local government election in Northern Ireland

1981 Limavady Borough Council election
| ← 1977 | 20 May 1981 | 1985 → |

All 15 seats to Limavady Borough Council 8 seats needed for a majority
| | First party | Second party | Third party |
|---|---|---|---|
| Party | UUP | SDLP | DUP |
| Seats won | 6 | 5 | 2 |
| Seat change | 0 | ▼1 | 0 |
| | Fourth party | Fifth party |
| Party | Irish Independence | Independent |
| Seats won | 1 | 1 |
| Seat change | ▲1 | 0 |

Elections to Limavady Borough Council were held on 20 May 1981 on the same day as the other Northern Irish local government elections. The election used three district electoral areas to elect a total of 15 councillors.

== Election results ==
Limavady Borough Council Election Result 1981
| Party | Seats | Gains | Losses | Net gain/loss | Seats % | Votes % | Votes | +/− |
|---|---|---|---|---|---|---|---|---|
| UUP | 6 | 0 | 0 | 0 | 40.0 | 37.2 | 4,366 | ▼1.4 |
| SDLP | 5 | 0 | 1 | ▼1 | 33.3 | 34.2 | 4,011 | ▲1.0 |
| DUP | 2 | 0 | 0 | 0 | 13.3 | 16.4 | 1,919 | ▲2.6 |
| Irish Independence | 1 | 1 | 0 | ▲1 | 6.7 | 5.5 | 643 | New |
| Independent | 1 | 0 | 0 | 0 | 6.7 | 4.3 | 501 | ▼0.5 |
| Alliance | 0 | 0 | 0 | 0 | 0.0 | 2.0 | 223 | ▼6.5 |
| Republican Clubs | 0 | 0 | 0 | 0 | 0.0 | 0.5 | 63 | ▼0.7 |

Note: "Votes" are the first preference votes.

== Districts summary ==
Results of the Limavady Borough Council election, 1981 by district
| Ward | % | Cllrs | % | Cllrs | % | Cllrs | % | Cllrs | % | Cllrs | Total Cllrs |
| Ward | UUP | | SDLP | | DUP | | IIP | | Others | | Total Cllrs |
|---|---|---|---|---|---|---|---|---|---|---|---|
| Area A | 32.9 | 2 | 50.3 | 3 | 16.7 | 1 | 0.0 | 0 | 0.0 | 0 | 6 |
| Area B | 33.7 | 2 | 24.5 | 1 | 8.2 | 0 | 17.9 | 1 | 15.7 | 1 | 5 |
| Area C | 44.2 | 2 | 27.5 | 1 | 23.0 | 1 | 0.0 | 0 | 5.3 | 0 | 4 |
| Total | 37.2 | 6 | 34.2 | 5 | 16.4 | 2 | 5.5 | 1 | 6.7 | 1 | 15 |

== Districts results ==
=== Area A ===
1977: 3 x SDLP, 2 x UUP, 1 x DUP
1981: 3 x SDLP, 2 x UUP, 1 x DUP
1977-1981 Change: No change

Limavady Area A - 6 seats
| Party | Candidate | FPv% | Count | | |
| Party | Candidate | FPv% | 1 | 2 | 3 |
|---|---|---|---|---|---|
| SDLP | Arthur Doherty* | 18.60% | 727 | | |
| SDLP | Roy King | 17.35% | 678 | | |
| DUP | Ernest Murray* | 16.73% | 654 | | |
| UUP | Robert Grant* | 14.41% | 563 | | |
| SDLP | Thomas Mullan* | 14.38% | 562 | | |
| UUP | Stanley Gault | 11.11% | 434 | 453 | 464 |
| UUP | James Gilfillan | 7.42% | 290 | 303 | 317 |
Electorate: 5,076 Valid: 3,908 (76.99%) Spoilt: 78 Quota: 559 Turnout: 3,986 (78.53%)

=== Area B ===
1977: 2 x UUP, 2 x SDLP, 1 x Independent
1981: 2 x UUP, 1 x SDLP, 1 x IIP, 1 x Independent
1977-1981 Change: IIP gain from SDLP

Limavady Area B - 5 seats
| Party | Candidate | FPv% | Count | | | | | | | |
| Party | Candidate | FPv% | 1 | 2 | 3 | 4 | 5 | 6 | 7 | 8 |
|---|---|---|---|---|---|---|---|---|---|---|
| UUP | David Robinson* | 24.56% | 883 | | | | | | | |
| SDLP | Lawrence Hegarty | 15.88% | 571 | 571.32 | 591.32 | 592.32 | 613.32 | | | |
| UUP | Max Gault* | 9.15% | 329 | 554.28 | 554.28 | 569.28 | 569.28 | 569.28 | 805.28 | |
| Independent | Denis Farren* | 13.94% | 501 | 504.52 | 510.52 | 511.52 | 518.84 | 535.84 | 545.88 | 559.88 |
| Irish Independence | Sean McCloskey | 8.87% | 319 | 319.96 | 329.96 | 329.96 | 383.96 | 537.96 | 537.96 | 537.96 |
| SDLP | James Brolly | 8.62% | 310 | 310 | 319 | 320.64 | 325.64 | 372.64 | 373.64 | 375.64 |
| DUP | Alex Fulton | 6.12% | 220 | 256.8 | 256.8 | 324.32 | 324.32 | 324.32 | | |
| Irish Independence | George McCormick | 5.48% | 197 | 197 | 203 | 203 | 237 | | | |
| Irish Independence | Andrew Murphy | 3.53% | 127 | 127.96 | 138.96 | 138.96 | | | | |
| DUP | John McKay | 2.09% | 75 | 87.48 | 87.48 | | | | | |
| Republican Clubs | Jerry Mullan | 1.75% | 63 | 63.32 | | | | | | |
Electorate: 5,007 Valid: 3,595 (71.80%) Spoilt: 120 Quota: 600 Turnout: 3,715 (74.20%)

=== Area C ===
1977: 2 x UUP, 1 x SDLP, 1 x DUP
1981: 2 x UUP, 1 x SDLP, 1 x DUP
1977-1981 Change: No change

Limavady Area C - 4 seats
| Party | Candidate | FPv% | Count | | | | | |
| Party | Candidate | FPv% | 1 | 2 | 3 | 4 | 5 | 6 |
|---|---|---|---|---|---|---|---|---|
| DUP | William Norris* | 17.26% | 729 | 776 | 938 | | | |
| SDLP | Barry Doherty* | 15.46% | 653 | 654 | 689 | 689 | 1,222 | |
| UUP | William Barbour* | 14.73% | 622 | 625 | 679 | 717.34 | 721.34 | 773.34 |
| UUP | William Cooke | 15.39% | 650 | 655 | 699 | 724.56 | 727.56 | 753.56 |
| UUP | John Dolan | 14.09% | 595 | 598 | 628 | 655.69 | 659.4 | 680.4 |
| SDLP | Geraldine Kearney | 12.08% | 510 | 510 | 559 | 559.71 | | |
| Alliance | Francis Parkinson | 5.28% | 223 | 223 | | | | |
| DUP | George Robinson | 3.15% | 133 | 182 | | | | |
| DUP | Arthur Reid | 2.56% | 108 | | | | | |
Electorate: 5,426 Valid: 4,223 (77.83%) Spoilt: 64 Quota: 845 Turnout: 4,287 (79.01%)
