= James Lenox-Conyngham Chichester-Clark =

Northern Irish politician and naval officer (1884–1933)

James Jackson Lenox-Conyngham Chichester-Clark (September 1884 – 31 January 1933) was a Member of Parliament of the House of Commons of Northern Ireland for South Londonderry from 1929 until his death; his mother-in-law was elected to replace him at the subsequent by-election. His son James Chichester-Clark later became Prime Minister of Northern Ireland. In the period before his death, he also served as County Londonderry Grand Master of the Grand Orange Lodge of Ireland, being a member of Castledawson LOL 96.

Born James Jackson Lenox-Conyngham Clark, the son of James Jackson Clark and grandson of James Johnston Clark at Largantogher House, Maghera; his other grandfather was William Fitzwilliam Lenox-Conyngham of Springhill. He was married to Marion Caroline Dehra Chichester, daughter of Dame Dehra Parker and had three children; James Chichester-Clark, Baron Moyola, Robin Chichester-Clark and Penelope Hobhouse.

Parliament of Northern Ireland
New constituency	Member of Parliament for South Londonderry; 1929–1933	Succeeded by Dehra Parker
