= Samuel Bateson =

Irish cricketer and British Army officer (1821–1879)

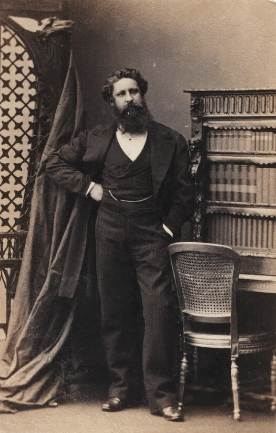

Personal information
- Full name: Samuel Stephen Bateson
- Born: 13 October 1821; Belfast, Ireland
- Died: 9 March 1879 (aged 57); Dornoch, Sutherland, Scotland
- Batting: Unknown

Domestic team information
- Years: Team
- 1844: Marylebone Cricket Club

Career statistics
Competition	First-class
Matches	1
Runs scored	3
Batting average	3.00
100s/50s	–/–
Top score	3
Catches/stumpings	–/–
- Source: Cricinfo, 8 November 2020

Samuel Stephen Bateson JP DL (13 October 1821 – 9 March 1879) was an Irish first-class cricketer and barrister.

== Life ==
The son of Sir Robert Bateson, he was born at Belfast in October 1821. He was educated in England at Rugby School, before going up to Trinity College, Cambridge. Bateson made a single appearance in first-class cricket for the Marylebone Cricket Club (MCC) against Cambridge University at Cambridge in 1844. Batting once in the match, he scored 3 runs in the MCC first innings before being dismissed by Henry Wroth.

A student of the Inner Temple, Bateson was called to the bar in 1847. He later lived in Scotland at Dornoch, where he was a justice of the peace and served as a deputy lieutenant of Sutherland in 1863. Bateson was the subject of the photographer Camille Silvy's work in 1861. His other interests included agricultural sciences. Bateson died at his home in Dornoch in March 1879, after suffering from acute inflammation of the lungs.

== Family ==
Bateson married in 1854 Florinda Handcock, daughter of Richard Handcock, 3rd Baron Castlemaine.

His brother was Thomas Bateson, 1st Baron Deramore.
