= South Londonderry (Northern Ireland Parliament constituency) =

Coordinates: 54.838°N 6.897°W

- Former County constituency for the Parliament of Northern Ireland
- South Londonderry shown within Northern Ireland

Former constituency
- Created: 1929
- Abolished: 1973
- Election method: First past the post

The South Londonderry constituency for the Parliament of Northern Ireland was created in 1929 and continued until the abolition of the Parliament in 1973. All members for the constituency were from the Chichester-Clark family: the first was both the son-in-law of the second and the father of the third.

Dehra Parker had been elected (as Dehra Chichester) for County Londonderry in the 1921 and 1925 elections under the single transferable vote; she became a Dame before the 1953 election. Her grandson James Dawson Chichester-Clark was Prime Minister of Northern Ireland from 1969–1971 and after his resignation was created Baron Moyola in 1971. All three elected members were not only from the same party, but were close relations, as were the penultimate member of the South Londonderry constituency for the Westminster parliament in 1922 and the Westminster MP for Londonderry from 1955 to 1972.

== Members of Parliament ==
Election	Member	Party
1929	James Lenox-Conyngham Chichester-Clark	Ulster Unionist
1933	Dehra Parker	Ulster Unionist
1933	Dehra Parker	Ulster Unionist
1938	Dehra Parker	Ulster Unionist
1945	Dehra Parker	Ulster Unionist
1949	Dehra Parker	Ulster Unionist
1953	Dehra Parker	Ulster Unionist
1958	Dehra Parker	Ulster Unionist
1960	James Chichester-Clark	Ulster Unionist
1962	James Chichester-Clark	Ulster Unionist
1965	James Chichester-Clark	Ulster Unionist
1969	James Chichester-Clark	Ulster Unionist
1973	Constituency abolished	

== Elections ==
The elections in this constituency took place using the first past the post electoral system.

1929 Northern Ireland general election: South Londonderry
Party	Candidate	Votes	%	±%
UUP	James Lenox-Conyngham Chichester-Clark	Unopposed	N/A	N/A

Following the death of Chichester-Clark:

By-election 15 March 1933: South Londonderry
Party	Candidate	Votes	%	±%
UUP	Dehra Parker	Unopposed	N/A	N/A
UUP hold		Swing	N/A	

1933 Northern Ireland general election: South Londonderry
Party	Candidate	Votes	%	±%
UUP	Dehra Parker	Unopposed	N/A	N/A
UUP hold		Swing	N/A	

1938 Northern Ireland general election: South Londonderry
Party	Candidate	Votes	%	±%
UUP	Dehra Parker	Unopposed	N/A	N/A
UUP hold		Swing	N/A	

1945 Northern Ireland general election: South Londonderry
Party	Candidate	Votes	%	±%
UUP	Dehra Parker	Unopposed	N/A	N/A
UUP hold		Swing	N/A	

1949 Northern Ireland general election: South Londonderry
Party	Candidate	Votes	%	±%
UUP	Dehra Parker	9,193	60.9	N/A
Nationalist	T. B. Agnew	5,909	39.1	New
Majority		3,284	21.8	N/A
Turnout		15,102	86.2	N/A
UUP hold		Swing	N/A	

1953 Northern Ireland general election: South Londonderry
Party	Candidate	Votes	%	±%
UUP	Dehra Parker	Unopposed	N/A	N/A
UUP hold		Swing	N/A	

1958 Northern Ireland general election: South Londonderry
Party	Candidate	Votes	%	±%
UUP	Dehra Parker	Unopposed	N/A	N/A
UUP hold		Swing	N/A	

Following the resignation of Parker:

By-election 9 July 1960: South Londonderry
Party	Candidate	Votes	%	±%
UUP	James Dawson Chichester-Clark	Unopposed	N/A	N/A
UUP hold		Swing	N/A	

1962 Northern Ireland general election: South Londonderry
Party	Candidate	Votes	%	±%
UUP	James Dawson Chichester-Clark	Unopposed	N/A	N/A
UUP hold		Swing	N/A	

1965 Northern Ireland general election: South Londonderry
Party	Candidate	Votes	%	±%
UUP	James Dawson Chichester-Clark	Unopposed	N/A	N/A
UUP hold		Swing	N/A	

1969 Northern Ireland general election: South Londonderry
Party	Candidate	Votes	%	±%
UUP	James Dawson Chichester-Clark	9,195	61.3	N/A
People's Democracy	Bernadette Devlin	5,812	38.7	New
Majority		3,383	22.6	N/A
Turnout		15,007	81.6	N/A
UUP hold		Swing	N/A	

== See also ==
- South Londonderry (UK Parliament constituency)
