= 1919 North Londonderry by-election =

UK Parliamentary by-election

- 4 March 1919
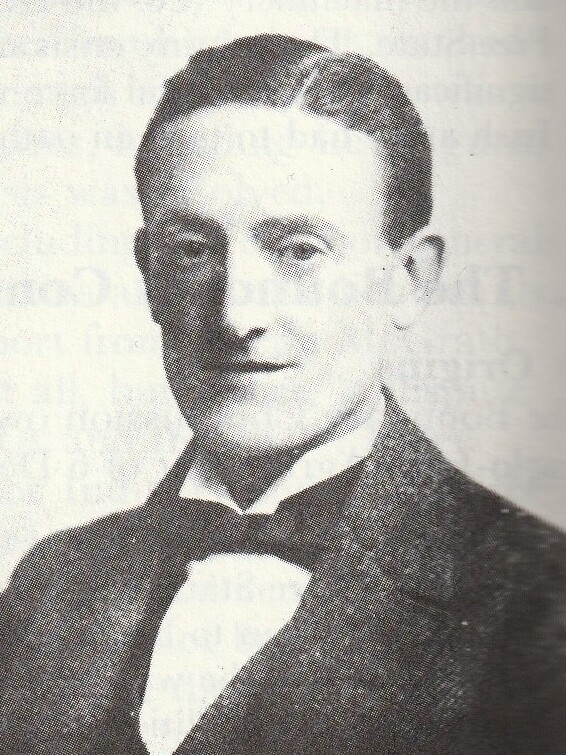
	UUU
Candidate	Hugh T. Barrie	Patrick McGilligan
Party	Irish Unionist	Sinn Féin
Alliance	Coalition
Popular vote	9,933	4,333
Percentage	69.6%	30.4%
Swing	▼3.1%	▲3.1%
MP before election
Hugh Anderson
Irish Unionist
Subsequent MP
Hugh T. Barrie
Irish Unionist

The 1919 North Londonderry by-election was held on 4 March 1919. The by-election was held due to the resignation of the incumbent Irish Unionist MP, Hugh Anderson. It was won by the Irish Unionist candidate Hugh T. Barrie. Barrie's Sinn Féin opponent, Patrick McGilligan, later become Irish Minister for External Affairs.

== Background ==
Hugh Anderson had been elected for North Londonderry in the 1918 United Kingdom general election. Three days after taking his Parliamentary oath of allegiance, he stepped down as an MP, citing that he believed that as he was the High Sheriff of County Londonderry, this was an office of profit so he was actually disqualified from being an MP. Accordingly, he was appointed as the Crown Steward and Bailiff of the Manor of Northstead, the official office of profit whereby he could vacate his seat.

Hugh T. Barrie was selected by the Irish Unionists to contest the seat, having previously been the North Londonderry MP from 1906 until 1918. He was the vice-president of the Department of Agriculture and Technical Instruction for Ireland and represented Ulster at the Irish Convention. Patrick McGilligan was selected as the Sinn Féin candidate. The North Londonderry by-election was the last Westminster election Sinn Féin contested prior to the partition of Ireland.

== Result ==
By-Election 4 March 1919: North Londonderry
Party	Candidate	Votes	%	±%
Irish Unionist	Hugh T. Barrie	9,933	69.6	–3.1
Sinn Féin	Patrick McGilligan	4,333	30.4	+3.1
Majority		5,600	39.2	−6.2
Turnout		14,266		
Irish Unionist hold		Swing	–3.1	

== Aftermath ==
After winning, Barrie would hold the seat until 1922 when he died. The 1922 North Londonderry by-election was won by the new Ulster Unionist Party unopposed. Although losing, McGilligan would later be appointed as the Minister for External Affairs in the Irish Free State.
