= 1977 Limavady District Council election =

Local government election in Northern Ireland

1977 Limavady Borough Council election
← 1973	18 May 1977	1981 →

All 15 seats to Limavady Borough Council 8 seats needed for a majority
	First party	Second party	Third party
Party	UUP	SDLP	DUP
Seats won	6	6	2
Seat change	▲6	▲2	▲2
	Fourth party	Fifth party	Sixth party
Party	Independent	United Unionist	Alliance
Seats won	1	0	0
Seat change	0	▼8	▼2

Elections to Limavady Borough Council were held on 18 May 1977 on the same day as the other Northern Irish local government elections. The election used three district electoral areas to elect a total of 15 councillors.

== Election results ==
Limavady Borough Council Election Result 1977
Party	Seats	Gains	Losses	Net gain/loss	Seats %	Votes %	Votes	+/−
UUP	6	6	0	▲6	40.0	38.6	3,987	New
SDLP	6	2	0	▲2	40.0	33.2	3,428	▲3.2
DUP	2	2	0	▲2	13.3	13.8	1,423	New
Independent	1	0	0	0	6.7	4.8	492	▼2.2
Alliance	0	0	2	▼2	0.0	8.5	874	▼2.7
Republican Clubs	0	0	0	0	0.0	1.2	121	▼2.9

Note: "Votes" are the first preference votes.

== Districts summary ==
Results of the Limavady Borough Council election, 1977 by district
Ward	%	Cllrs	%	Cllrs	%	Cllrs	%	Cllrs	Total Cllrs
Ward	UUP		SDLP		DUP		Others		Total Cllrs
Area A	33.0	2	43.1	3	13.0	1	10.9	0	6
Area B	34.4	2	33.0	2	12.4	0	20.2	1	5
Area C	48.1	2	23.0	1	15.7	1	13.2	0	4
Total	38.6	6	33.2	6	13.8	2	14.4	1	15

== Districts results ==
=== Area A ===
1973: 3 x United Unionist, 2 x SDLP, 1 x Alliance
1977: 3 x SDLP, 2 x UUP, 1 x DUP
1973-1977 Change: UUP (two seats), DUP and SDLP gain from United Unionist (three seats) and Alliance

Limavady Area A - 6 seats
Party	Candidate	FPv%	Count				
Party	Candidate	FPv%	1	2	3	4	5
SDLP	Michael Nicholas*	19.43%	724				
UUP	Robert Grant*	14.81%	552				
SDLP	Thomas Mullan	13.55%	505	510	630.58		
SDLP	Arthur Doherty	10.14%	378	378	439.36	533.86	
UUP	Florence Sloan*	9.63%	359	368	368	368.21	629.21
DUP	Ernest Murray	13.04%	486	488	488.52	488.73	542.73
Alliance	James Boylan*	9.12%	340	383	385.6	386.65	387.65
UUP	Hugh Guthrie	8.59%	320	323	323.26	323.26	
Alliance	Stanley Stewart	1.69%	63				
Electorate: 5,044 Valid: 3,727 (73.89%) Spoilt: 113 Quota: 533 Turnout: 3,840 (76.13%)

=== Area B ===
1973: 2 x United Unionist, 2 x SDLP, 1 x Independent
1977: 2 x UUP, 2 x SDLP, 1 x Independent
1973-1977 Change: UUP (two seats) gain from United Unionist

Limavady Area B - 5 seats
Party	Candidate	FPv%	Count					
Party	Candidate	FPv%	1	2	3	4	5	6
UUP	David Robinson	20.62%	627					
SDLP	Raymond Brady*	17.92%	545					
Independent	Denis Farren*	16.18%	492	494.47	494.85	535.85		
UUP	Max Gault*	11.84%	360	447.02	504.09	504.09	504.09	504.69
SDLP	Joseph McLaughlin	9.40%	286	286.19	288.38	304.38	444.57	481.77
DUP	John McKay	12.43%	378	392.44	400.53	401.72	401.72	401.82
SDLP	James Brolly	5.69%	173	173.19	173.38	211.38		
Republican Clubs	James McLaughlin	3.98%	121	121	122.19			
UUP	William Scott	1.94%	59	72.49				
Electorate: 5,110 Valid: 3,041 (59.51%) Spoilt: 134 Quota: 507 Turnout: 3,175 (62.13%)

=== Area C ===
1973: 3 x United Unionist, 1 x Alliance
1977: 2 x UUP, 1 x SDLP, 1 x DUP
1973-1977 Change: UUP (two seats), SDLP and DUP gain from United Unionist (three seats) and Alliance

Limavady Area C - 4 seats
Party	Candidate	FPv%	Count					
Party	Candidate	FPv%	1	2	3	4	5	6
SDLP	Barry Doherty	22.97%	817					
UUP	William Barbour*	19.23%	684	688	690.21	1,025.21		
UUP	Ronald Nicholl*	14.48%	515	521	521.68	656.85	918.17	
DUP	William Norris	15.72%	559	559	559.34	588.51	618.59	747.59
Alliance	William Archibald*	9.28%	330	449	545.22	561.22	580.02	655.02
UUP	Stanley Gault*	14.37%	511	519	519.51			
Alliance	Brian Brown	3.96%	141					
Electorate: 5,152 Valid: 3,557 (69.04%) Spoilt: 132 Quota: 712 Turnout: 3,689 (71.60%)
