= Hugh Anderson (British politician) =

British politician (1867–1933)

Member of Parliament for North Londonderry
- In office 1918–1919
- Preceded by: Hugh T. Barrie
- Succeeded by: Hugh T. Barrie

Personal details
- Born: Hugh Alfred Anderson; 26 November 1867
- Died: 16 June 1933 (aged 65)
- Party: Irish Unionist Alliance

Hugh Alfred Anderson (26 November 1867 – 16 June 1933) was an Irish Unionist Alliance activist who was Member of Parliament for North Londonderry from the general election of 14 December 1918 until 13 February 1919.

He resigned only three days after taking the parliamentary oath, becoming one of the shortest serving MPs ever. Anderson was the election agent for Hugh T. Barrie, who had represented North Londonderry since 1906 and won the by-election caused by Anderson's resignation. The only reason Barrie had not stood in 1918 was that he was then High Sheriff of County Londonderry and was worried that might be considered an office of profit disqualifying him from the Commons.

Parliament of the United Kingdom
Preceded by Hugh T. Barrie	Member of Parliament for North Londonderry; 1918–1919	Succeeded by Hugh T. Barrie
