= North Londonderry (UK Parliament constituency) =

Parliamentary constituency in the United Kingdom, 1885–1922

- Former county constituency for the House of Commons
- County: County Londonderry

1885–1922
- Seats: 1
- Created from: Coleraine; County Londonderry
- Replaced by: Londonderry

North Londonderry, or North Derry, was a parliament constituency in Ireland which returned one Member of Parliament to the House of Commons of the United Kingdom on the electoral system of first past the post from 1885 to 1922.

== Politics ==
The constituency was a predominantly unionist area. Sinn Féin was easily beaten in 1918 and 1919.

== Boundaries ==
Prior to 1885, County Londonderry returned two MPs to the House of Commons of the United Kingdom sitting at the Palace of Westminster. Under the Redistribution of Seats Act 1885, the parliamentary county was divided into the divisions of North Derry and South Derry. The parliamentary borough of Coleraine lost its separate representation.

North Derry was defined as:

The baronies of— Kennaught, North East Liberties of Coleraine, North West Liberties of Londonderry, and Tirkeeran,

and so much of the barony of Coleraine, as comprises the parishes of—Dunboe, Formoyle, Killowen, and Macosquin,

and in the parish of Aghadowey the townlands of—Ballinrees, Ballybritain, Ballycaghan, Ballyclough, Ballydevitt, Ballylintagh, Ballymenagh, Ballynacally Beg, Ballynacally More, Ballywillin, Clintagh, Collins, Craigmore, Crevolea, Craiglea Glebe, Crosseanley Glebe, Crossmakeever, Culdrum, Drumsteeple, Glencurb, Keely, Killeague, Kiltest, Knockaduff, Lisnamuck, Managher, Mayboy, Meavemanougher, Meencraig, Moneybrannon, Mullan, Scalty, and Shanlongford.

It was not affected by the Redistribution of Seats (Ireland) Act 1918. Sinn Féin contested the 1918 general election on an abstentionist platform that instead of taking up any seats at Westminster, they would establish a revolutionary assembly in Dublin. All MPs elected to Irish seats were invited to participate in the First Dáil convened in January 1919, but no members outside of Sinn Féin did so.

The Government of Ireland Act 1920 established the Parliament of Northern Ireland, which came into operation in 1921. The representation of Northern Ireland at Westminster was reduced from 30 MPs to 13 MPs, taking effect at the 1922 United Kingdom general election. At Westminster, Londonderry City, North Derry and South Derry were combined to form the single-seat county constituency of Londonderry. A five-seat constituency of Londonderry was created for the House of Commons of Northern Ireland, which formed the basis in republican theory for representation in the Second Dáil.

== Members of Parliament ==
Election	MP	Party
1885	Henry Mulholland	Irish Conservative
1895	John Atkinson	Irish Unionist
1906	Hugh Barrie	Irish Unionist
1918	Hugh Anderson	Irish Unionist
1919	Hugh Barrie	Irish Unionist
1922	Malcolm Macnaghten	UUP

== Elections ==
=== Elections in the 1880s ===
1885 general election: North Londonderry
Party	Candidate	Votes	%	±%
Irish Conservative	Henry Mulholland	5,180	62.5	
Liberal	Samuel Walker	3,017	37.5	
Majority		2,073	25.0	
Turnout		8,287	74.1	
Registered electors		11,189		
Irish Conservative win (new seat)				

1886 general election: North Londonderry
Party	Candidate	Votes	%	±%
Irish Conservative	Henry Mulholland	Unopposed		
Irish Conservative hold				

=== Elections in the 1890s ===
1892 general election: North Londonderry
Party	Candidate	Votes	%	±%
Irish Unionist	Henry Mulholland	5,490	70.5	N/A
Liberal	Thomas Greer	2,300	29.5	New
Majority		3,190	41.0	N/A
Turnout		7,790	68.1	N/A
Registered electors		11,443		
Irish Unionist hold		Swing	N/A	

1895 general election: North Londonderry
Party	Candidate	Votes	%	±%
Irish Unionist	John Atkinson	4,763	65.2	−5.3
Liberal	Arthur Houston	2,538	34.8	+5.3
Majority		2,225	30.6	−10.4
Turnout		7,301	72.0	+3.9
Registered electors		10,139		
Irish Unionist hold		Swing	−5.3	

=== Elections in the 1900s ===
1900 general election: North Londonderry
Party	Candidate	Votes	%	±%
Irish Unionist	John Atkinson	Unopposed		
Irish Unionist hold				

1906 general election: North Londonderry
Party	Candidate	Votes	%	±%
Irish Unionist	Hugh T. Barrie	4,806	64.0	N/A
Russellite Unionist	Arnold White	2,699	36.0	New
Majority		2,107	28.0	N/A
Turnout		7,505	79.3	N/A
Registered electors		9,462		
Irish Unionist hold		Swing	N/A	

=== Elections in the 1910s ===
January 1910 general election: North Londonderry
Party	Candidate	Votes	%	±%
Irish Unionist	Hugh T. Barrie	Unopposed		
Irish Unionist hold				

December 1910 general election: North Londonderry
Party	Candidate	Votes	%	±%
Irish Unionist	Hugh T. Barrie	4,960	69.1	N/A
Liberal	William Herbert Brown	2,217	30.9	New
Majority		2,743	38.2	N/A
Turnout		7,177	76.8	N/A
Registered electors		9,349		
Irish Unionist hold		Swing	N/A	

1918 general election: North Londonderry
Party	Candidate	Votes	%	±%
Irish Unionist	Hugh Anderson	10,530	72.7	+3.6
Sinn Féin	Patrick McGilligan	3,951	27.3	New
Majority		6,579	45.4	+7.2
Turnout		14,481	68.0	−8.8
Registered electors		21,306		
Irish Unionist hold		Swing	+3.6	

Anderson resigns, prompting a by-election.

1919 by-election: North Londonderry
Party	Candidate	Votes	%	±%
Irish Unionist	Hugh T. Barrie	9,933	69.6	−3.1
Sinn Féin	Patrick McGilligan	4,333	30.4	+3.1
Majority		5,600	39.2	−6.2
Turnout		14,266		
Irish Unionist hold		Swing	−3.1	

=== Elections in the 1920s ===
Barrie dies, prompting a by-election.

1922 by-election: North Londonderry
Party	Candidate	Votes	%	±%
UUP	Malcolm Macnaghten	Unopposed		
UUP hold				

== See also ==
- List of MPs elected in the 1918 United Kingdom general election
- Historic Dáil constituencies
