= Henry Wise Parker =

Royal Navy admiral

Admiral Henry Wise Parker, CB, CMG (15 June 1875 – 1 August 1940) was a Royal Navy officer. At the Battle of Jutland in 1916, he was flag captain to Vice-Admiral Sir Doveton Sturdee of the 4th Battle Squadron in HMS Benbow.

His wife was the politician Dame Dehra Parker.
