= Manus Canning =

Politician from Northern Ireland

Manus Canning (died 16 March 2018) was an Irish republican politician and paramilitary.

Born in Derry, Canning spent time in Gweedore practising the Irish language before working in London for a few years in the late 1940s. He had returned to Derry by April 1951, when he secretly attached the flag of Ireland to the top of Walker's Pillar in the city. He joined the Irish Republican Army's Derry Unit, which successfully raided the Ebrington Barracks of the British Army. As a result of this experience, Canning was sent to England in 1953, where he, Cathal Goulding and Seán Mac Stíofáin raided the British Officers Training Corps School, obtaining a significant amount of weaponry. However, the three were caught when their vehicle was stopped in London. They received prison sentences of eight years each, which they spent at Wormwood Scrubs.

While in prison, Canning stood for Sinn Féin in Londonderry at the 1955 general election, taking 35.5% of the vote. He stood again in 1959, when the party attempted a public campaign on his behalf, but he took only 27% of the vote. He also taught Mac Stíofáin to speak Irish. On release, he was sent by the IRA to Germany and Austria to source ammunition for future attacks.

In 1960, Canning moved to New York City to work for a publishing company. At the request of the IRA, he and Vincent Conlon assumed the leadership of Clan na Gael in the hope of raising additional funds for the IRA, although this had little immediate effect.

While in New York, Canning spent time with Brendan Behan, and in 1964 met Naoko, the couple later marrying and moving back to Derry. He died in the city in March 2018.
