= Theobald Jones =

Irish Royal Navy Admiral, politician, lichenologist and fossil-collector (1790–1868)

Admiral Theobald Jones (15 April 1790 – 7 February 1868), also known as Toby Jones, was an Irish officer in the British Royal Navy, a Tory politician, a noted lichenologist, and a fossil-collector. The County Londonderry-born son of a Church of Ireland clergyman, Jones was descended from a 17th-century Welsh settler in Ireland. Several generations of his family had held public office in the Kingdom of Ireland, including membership of the pre-union Parliament of Ireland.

Entering the navy aged 13 during the Napoleonic Wars, the teenage Jones survived several naval engagements and the burning of his ship at night when he was 16. After ten years serving under the captaincy of his step-mother's brother, Henry Blackwood, Jones reached the rank of commander by age 25, and captain at 38, but never actually sailed as a captain.

Aged 40, Jones entered Parliament for County Londonderry, in the interest of the Marquess of Waterford. An Orangeman and Ultra Tory of "plain unassuming manners", he sat in the House of Commons of the United Kingdom at Westminster from 1830 until he stood down from Parliament in 1857. A member of several learned societies, he occupied his retirement from politics by making the first comprehensive catalogue of Irish lichens, laying the foundation of Irish lichenology.

== Early life and family ==
Jones was the second son of the Reverend James Jones (died 1825), a Church of Ireland clergyman. His mother Lydia was the daughter of Theobald Wolfe of Blackhall, County Kildare. Rev Jones's first appointment was in 1783 as the prebendary in Killamery. In 1786 he became rector of Kilcronaghan in County Londonderry, where Theobald was born in 1790. He then moved to Tamlaght O'Crilly later that year, and then to Urney in County Tyrone. After Lydia's death in 1793, Rev Jones remarried in 1796 to Anne Ryder, the widow of John Ryder (Dean of Lismore) and daughter of Sir John Blackwood, 2nd Bt from County Down. Sir John sat in the House of Commons of Ireland from 1761 to 1799 for Killyleagh and Bangor.

Between1814 and 1819 Rev Jones became the County Grand Master of the Orange Order in County Londonderry. The family were involved in the defeat of the 1798 Rebellion.

=== Ancestry ===
Rev Jones was the younger brother of Theophilus Jones (1760–1835), an admiral in the Royal Navy. Their first-born brother Walter (1754–1839) was governor of County Leitrim, and an MP for Coleraine in the latter years of the Irish Parliament, and then sat for Coleraine at Westminster until 1809. Their father Theophilus Jones (1729–1811) was an MP for Coleraine and Leitrim.

The family traced their ancestry to Bryan Jones (died 1681), a Welshman who had been granted lands in Ireland by James I in 1622. Bryan's grandson Theophilus Jones (1666–1742) was a member of the Irish House of Commons from 1692 to 1742, for Sligo and then County Leitrim.

== Naval career ==
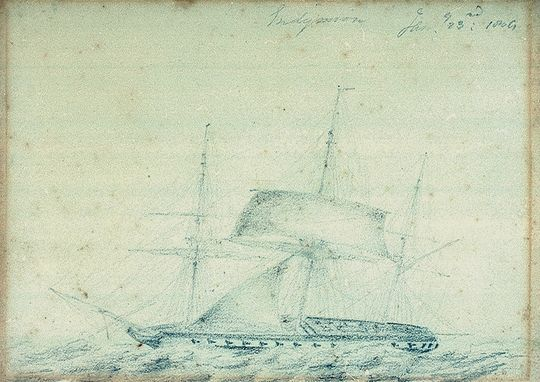
The 40-gun fifth-rate frigate HMS Emdymion, on which Jones served during the Dardanelles Operation in 1807

Jones joined the navy in 1803 as a volunteer midshipman aboard HMS Melpomene, taking part in the bombardment of French ports. He transferred in 1805 to the 36-gun frigate HMS Euryalus, under Captain Henry Blackwood, the brother of his father's second wife Anne. He transferred in 1807 to Blackwood's new command, the 74-gun third rate HMS Ajax.

During the Dardanelles Operation, Jones was one of the survivors when Ajax caught fire at anchor off the Turkish island of Tenedos. The fire started at about 9pm on the evening of 14 February 1807, caused by the carelessness of a drunken crewman, and spread rapidly. Within ten minutes heavy smoke prevented the launching of boats, and soon afterwards flames reached the main deck, forcing abandonment of the ship. The ship's company jumped into the water, and about 250 died.

For the remainder of the Dardanelles Operation, Jones served on the 40-gun fifth-rate frigate HMS Emdymion under Captain Thomas Bladen Capel. When he returned to England, he joined fellow Ulsterman Blackwood on his latest command, the newly built 74-gun HMS Warspite. (Blackwood's disciplinarian command of Warspite was described in the letters of the midshipman James Cheape, who wrote of lashings being ordered almost daily).

Promoted to Lieutenant in July 1809, Jones saw further action on Warspite in July 1810, when they engaged the French fleet off Toulon. In 1814 he transferred to HMS Desiree under Captain William Woolridge, which sailed to the Cape of Good Hope. On his return to England in February 1815, he found that he been promoted in July 1814 to the rank of commander.

In 1819 Jones took command of the 10-gun HMS Cherokee, stationed at Leith. After 3 years on Cherokee, his next appointment was in 1827, when he became second captain of the 120-gun first-rate HMS Prince Regent under captains Constantine Richard Moorsom and George Poulett. For a time, Prince Regent was the flagship of Jones's former captain Henry Blackwood, now Commander-in-Chief, The Nore.

On 25 August 1828, the 38-year-old Jones was promoted to the rank of captain. He never put to sea again, but was still paid, at a rate reported in 1833 as 10s/6d per day. He retired from the navy in 1848, but was promoted to rear admiral in 1855, vice admiral in 1862, and full admiral in 1865.

== Politics ==
=== Background ===
Jones's native County Londonderry was a largely Protestant area, a legacy of the 17th-century Plantation of Ulster. In the early 19th-century its politics were dominated by two powerful land-owning families: the Marquess of Waterford's Beresford family, and the Marquess of Londonderry's Stewart family (known from 1746 to 1789 by their former title Earl of Tyrone). The Ponsonby family retained a dormant interest, but were not actively involved in this era.

The Stewart and Beresford families had been intermittent rivals, usually dividing the representation of the county with one seat nominated by each family. William Ponsonby had been elected in 1812 as the last Ponsonby MP for the county, but after his death in 1815 at the Battle of Waterloo, the resulting by-election had been won by the Beresford-backed George Robert Dawson, a brother-in-law of Robert Peel.

When the Catholic Association began to organise in the County in 1823, it aroused Protestant fears which Dawson echoed. In 1825 he had presented an anti-Catholic petition to the House of Commons, signed by 1,700 County Londonderry residents. At the 1826 general election he was re-elected as a vigorous opponent of Catholic Emancipation, alongside the pro-Catholic Alexander Stewart. In November of that year Dawson presented a further anti-Catholic petition, this time with a claimed 22,000 signatures.

However, when the Irish-born Duke of Wellington became Prime Minister in 1828, he was alarmed by Daniel O'Connell's by-election victory in County Clare, and moved to enact Catholic emancipation. The Londonderry City MP Sir George Hill had warned in 1826 that Dawson would be O'Connell's "chief mark", and the prediction proved accurate. Dawson's extreme anti-Catholic speeches led O'Connell to claim in 1827 that he could "beat Dawson" at the polls.

Dawson then changed course, and began to support Wellington's proposals. His volte-face shocked and alarmed his former backers, who feared the loss of Protestant political supremacy on the county. In a tense atmosphere, with petitions gathered by both pro- and anti-Catholic factions, the Beresfords feared losing all control of Londonderry, as O'Connell's intervention had already lost them control of County Waterford in 1826.

In August 1829, the Beresfords sought the support of the Prime Minister, who backed Dawson. They then tried negotiation with Dawson, who offered to withdraw from the county in return for a seat in one of the Beresford's pocket boroughs, but his offer was refused. Instead, their dilemma was resolved by events. Alexander Stewart retired, and the 3rd Marquess of Londonderry quietly supported the independent Sir Robert Bateson, who was well-placed to take Dawson's support.

Dawson withdrew, and Wellington found him a seat in the English treasury borough of Harwich. The Beresfords had agonised over who they might choose as a candidate, seeking someone popular but wary of increasing the influence of a potential rival. Now with Dawson going and Londonderry accepting one seat, they had a free hand.

=== In Parliament ===
The Beresford's choice was their relative Theobald Jones. His grandmother Catherine (died 1763), wife of his paternal grandfather Theophilus Jones (1729–1811), was a Beresford. She was a daughter of the 1st Earl of Tyrone, making the 3rd Marquess of Waterford (1811–1859) Jones's second cousin.

As an orangeman, Jones carried the credentials they sought. At the general election in August 1830, Bateson and Jones were elected unopposed as the Members of Parliament (MPs) for County Londonderry.

In his election speech, Jones declared his independence from the administration, claiming that he would "never be found servilely walking in the wake of the minister". He announced that he would have voted against the Roman Catholic Relief Act 1829, and later that year he was categorised as an Ultra-Tory. He voted against the Reform Bill in March 1831, and was re-elected in May 1831 against a challenge from the reformer Sir John Byng, the Commander-in-Chief, Ireland and owner of the Conolly estate at Bellaghy.

When the revised Reform Bill came before the Commons, Jones voted against it at second reading, but supported its third reading. He was re-elected unopposed in 1832, and was returned without a contest at four subsequent elections. He was challenged in 1852 by the Liberal barrister and land-reformer Samuel MacCurdy Greer, but held his seat, and stood down from Parliament at the 1857 general election, aged 67.

== Lichenology ==
In May 1842, Jones was elected as a Fellow of the Linnean Society of London. In 1858 the Scottish botanist David Moore, director of Royal Dublin Society's botanic garden, introduced Jones to the Irish botanist Isaac Carroll. Jones and Carroll began a regular correspondence about lichens, which is preserved in the National Museum of Ireland. A selection of their letters was published in 1996 by the National Botanic Gardens.

In 1859 Jones became an associate member of the Dublin University Zoological and Botanical Association. In about 1860 the Association asked Jones to make a comprehensive collection of Irish lichens. His results were presented in a paper read to a meeting of the Natural History Society of Dublin in May 1864, and subsequently published as a book. Jones listed nearly 350 taxa, 20 of which had not been reported from Ireland before.

Some of Jones's work is preserved in London and Helsinki, and he bequeathed a substantial lichen collection to the natural history museum of the Royal Dublin Society (RDS), to which he had been elected a life member in 1838. The RDS transferred the ownership of the museum building in Kildare Street and its collections to the state in 1877. The Admiral Jones collection was held by the Natural History Museum of Ireland until 1970, when the museum transferred its entire botanical collection to the National Botanic Gardens in Glasnevin. Jones's collection is preserved there in the National Herbarium building, still in its original purpose-built cabinets.

Jones was also a member of the Geological Society of London. After his death in London on 7 February 1868, the society commended his large collection of fish fossils from the carboniferous limestones of Ireland.

The standard author abbreviation T.Jones is used to indicate this person as the author when citing a botanical name.

== Works ==
- Jones, Theobald (1865). Report on the progress made in collecting the Irish lichens. Dublin: McGlashan & Gill. OL 21867628M.
- Jones, Theobald (1865). On the occurrence of spiral vessels in the thallus of Evernia prunastri (Ach.; Linn. sp.). Dublin: McGlashan & Gill. OL 21867608M.

== Sources ==
- Burke, John (1836). A Genealogical and Heraldic History of the Commoners of Great Britain and Ireland, Enjoying Territorial Possessions Or High Official Rank: But Uninvested with Heritable Honours. Vol. 3. H. Colburn.
- Burke, John Bernard (1852). A Genealogical and Heraldic History of the Peerage and Baronetage of The British Empire. Vol. 3 (14th ed.). Colburn & Co.

Parliament of the United Kingdom
Preceded by George Robert Dawson; Alexander Robert Stewart	Member of Parliament for County Londonderry; 1830 – 1857; With: Sir Robert Bateson, Bt 1830–42; Robert Bateson 1842–44; Thomas Bateson 1844–57; James Johnston Clark 1857	Succeeded by James Johnston Clark; Samuel MacCurdy Greer
