= Hugh T. Barrie =

Scottish-born businessman and unionist politician

The Right Honourable Hugh T. Barrie MP DL JP
- Barrie in 1917

Senator of Northern Ireland
- In office 1921–1922

Member of Parliament for North Londonderry
- In office 4 March 1919 – 1922
- Preceded by: Hugh Anderson
- Succeeded by: Sir Malcolm Macnaghten
- In office 1906–1918
- Preceded by: John Atkinson
- Succeeded by: Hugh Anderson

High Sheriff of County Londonderry
- In office 1918

Personal details
- Born: Hugh Thom Barrie; 6 August 1860 Glasgow, Scotland
- Died: 19 April 1922 (aged 61) The Manor House, Coleraine, Northern Ireland
- Party: Ulster Unionist Party
- Other political affiliations: Irish Unionist Alliance
- Occupation: Businessman, politician

Hugh Thom Barrie MP DL JP (6 August 1860 – 19 April 1922) was a Scottish-born businessman and unionist politician who was Member of Parliament for North Londonderry from 1906 until his death, with a short break after the 1918 general election. "Though not a noted orator on the level of [Edward] Carson, his industrious nature, popular touch and work ethic, coupled with his Scottish connections, enabled Barrie to play a vital role" in Ulster unionist opposition to Irish Home Rule.

== Business and family life ==
Barrie was born in Glasgow to William Barrie and came to Coleraine in 1879. He worked in an agricultural export business and took it over in 1894.

In 1892 Barrie married Katherine Quarry, daughter of W. H. Quarry of the Methodist Church in Ireland. He himself was Presbyterian. They had three sons and one daughter, including Sir Walter Barrie (1901–1988), a chairman of the Chartered Insurance Institute and Lloyd's of London.

== Politics ==
Barrie was a Coleraine town commissioner from 1889 and urban district councillor from 1899, chairing the council for several years. He was a prominent Freemason and Orangeman and supported women's suffrage. Barrie helped to establish the Coleraine Technical College in 1901. He was elected to Westminster in 1906 and retained his seat in January 1910 and December 1910. He promoted the Ulster Covenant and led the Ulster unionist delegation at the 1917–18 Irish Convention. In 1918 he was High Sheriff of County Londonderry and did not stand in the 1918 United Kingdom general election due to uncertainty of his eligibility to run and to avoid the possibility of being unseated via petition. Hugh Anderson, Barrie's election agent, was elected in his stead, standing down in February 1919, with Barrie regaining his seat in the ensuing by-election on 4 March.

Barrie was vice-president of the Department of Agriculture and Technical Instruction for Ireland from 1919 to November 1921, for which he was appointed the Privy Council of Ireland in the 1920 Birthday Honours, entitling him to the style "The Right Honourable". He was also a member of the Senate of Northern Ireland. Barrie resigned from the position on 19 November 1921 over the government's negotiations with Sinn Féin which would culminate in the Anglo-Irish Treaty on 6 December that year. He believed the issue to have already been settled by the Government of Ireland Act 1920, and wrote letters of protest to both the Chief secretary for Ireland, Sir Hamar Greenwood, and the prime minister, David Lloyd George.

Barrie died in his residence at The Manor House in Coleraine, Northern Ireland, on 19 April 1922.

== Citations ==
Parliament of the United Kingdom
Preceded by John Atkinson	Member of Parliament for North Londonderry; 1906–1918	Succeeded by Hugh Anderson
Preceded by Hugh Anderson	Member of Parliament for North Londonderry; 1919–1922	Succeeded by Malcolm Macnaghten
