= William Wellwood =

Politician from Northern Ireland (1893–1971)

Captain William Wellwood MC (1893 – 28 Jun 1971) was the Ulster Unionist Party MP for Londonderry in the Westminster Parliament from 1951 to 1955.

Following the resignation of incumbent MP Ronald Ross, Wellwood was elected unopposed in a by-election on 19 May 1951. He was one of the last four MPs to be unopposed in a general election, on 25 October 1951.

He retired at the 1955 United Kingdom general election, and was replaced by Robin Chichester-Clark.

Parliament of the United Kingdom
Preceded by Sir Ronald Ross, Bt	Member of Parliament for Londonderry; 1951–1955	Succeeded by Robin Chichester-Clark
