= Sir Ronald Ross, 2nd Baronet =

British Army officer and Northern Irish politician (1888–1958)

Lieutenant-Colonel Sir Ronald Ross MC Bt
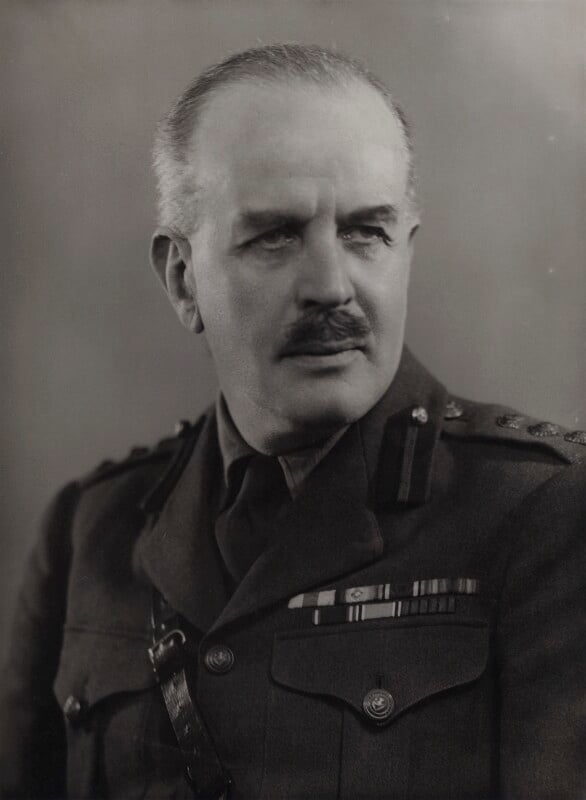
- Ross in 1943
- Born: Ronald Deane Ross; 13 July 1888
- Died: 31 January 1958 (aged 69)
- Military career
- Allegiance: United Kingdom
- Branch: British Army
- Service years: 1907–1938, 1939–1950
- Rank: Lieutenant-Colonel
- Awards: Croix de Guerre

Lieutenant-Colonel Sir Ronald Deane Ross, 2nd Baronet MC (13 July 1888 – 31 January 1958) was an Ulster Unionist Northern Irish Member of Parliament (MP).

He was the only son of Sir John Ross, 1st Baronet, the last judge to hold the office of Lord Chancellor of Ireland, and Katherine Mary Jeffcock. He succeeded to the title on his father's death in 1935.

== Military career ==
Ross was educated at Eton College and Trinity College, Cambridge. He was commissioned into the North Irish Horse on 21 June 1907 as a second lieutenant, and was promoted to lieutenant on 23 April 1912.

He served in the First World War with the North Irish Horse. He was promoted to captain on 12 December 1914, and later to major. He was awarded the Military Cross. He resigned his commission in 1938, but rejoined his regiment in 1939 and served in the Second World War, reaching the rank of lieutenant-colonel. He transferred to the Royal Inniskilling Fusiliers in 1947 and retired in 1950.

Ross is best remembered as The 'One Man Regiment' from 1934 to 1938, when he was the sole member of the North Irish Horse, a squadron-sized yeomanry regiment.

== Political career ==
Ross stood unsuccessfully against Sidney Webb as the Conservative candidate in the Seaham constituency of County Durham in the General Election 1923 and the October 1924 General Election. He was elected unopposed to the British Parliament in 1929 in a byelection for the Londonderry constituency, a seat once held by his father. He was re-elected unopposed for the same constituency in 1931 and 1935. He was returned again in 1945 and again in 1950 with majorities of 50.75% and 62.59% respectively, before resigning his seat in 1951, triggering an uncontested by-election which was won by the Ulster Unionist Party.

== Personal life ==
His wife was Lady Dorothy Evelyn Francis Ross. It is not clear if they had any children (see NPG).

He died in 1958, aged 69.

== Arms ==
Coat of arms of Sir Ronald Ross, 2nd Baronet
| Crest A fox's head erased holding in his mouth a white rose slipped barbed and seeded all Proper. Escutcheon Gules a portcullis Or between three lions rampant guardant Argent each holding between his paws a water bouget Sable. Motto (Hope Lightens Danger) |

Parliament of the United Kingdom
| Preceded by Malcolm Macnaghten | Member of Parliament for Londonderry; 1929–1951 | Succeeded by William Wellwood |
Baronetage of the United Kingdom
| Preceded by John Ross | Baronet (of Dunmoyle); 1935–1968 | Extinct |
