= Robert Bateson (politician) =

British politician

Robert Bateson (29 March 1816 – 23 December 1843) was an Irish Conservative politician.

He was the oldest son of Sir Robert Bateson, 1st Baronet and his wife Catherine, the youngest daughter of Samuel Dickinson.

Bateson entered the British House of Commons in 1842, sitting for Londonderry, the same constituency his father had previously represented, until his own early death in the following year.

He died of typhus aged 27 on a visit of Jerusalem, predeceasing his father. He was succeeded as a Member of Parliament by his younger brother Thomas, later raised to the Peerage of the United Kingdom as Baron Deramore. His youngest brother George was per a special remainder heir to the barony.

Parliament of the United Kingdom
Preceded by Theobald Jones; Sir Robert Bateson, 1st Bt	Member of Parliament for Londonderry; 1842–1843; With: Theobald Jones	Succeeded by Theobald Jones; Thomas Bateson
