= HMS Cherokee (1808) =

UK naval brig-sloop and merchantman 1808–1831

History

United Kingdom
- Name: HMS Cherokee
- Ordered: 30 March 1807
- Builder: John Perry, Blackwall Yard, London
- Laid down: December 1807
- Launched: 24 February 1808
- Commissioned: April 1808
- Decommissioned: c.1824
- Fate: Sold, 26 March 1828

United Kingdom
- Name: Cherokee
- Acquired: 1828
- Fate: Wrecked 27 August 1831

General characteristics
- Class & type: Cherokee-class brig-sloop
- Tons burthen: 237 38/94, or 239, or 250 bm
- Length: Overall: 90 feet 1 5/8 inches (27.47 m); Keel: 73 feet 8 5/8 inches (22.47 m)
- Beam: 24 ft 7 in (7.49 m)
- Draught: Forward: 6 ft 6 in (1.98 m); Aft: 9 ft 2 in (2.79 m)
- Depth of hold: 11 ft 0 in (3.35 m)
- Propulsion: Sails
- Sail plan: Brig
- Complement: 75
- Armament: 8 × 18-pounder carronades + 2 × 6-pounder chase guns

Service record
- Commanders: Cdr. Richard Arthur (1808–1810); Cdr. William Ramage (1810–1816); Cdr. Thomas Smith (1817–1819); Cdr. Theobald Jones (1819–1822); Cdr. William Keats (1822–c.1824)
- Operations: Walcheren Campaign; Gunboat War
- Awards: Naval General Service Medal "Cherokee 10 Jany. 1810"

HMS Cherokee was the lead ship of her class of 10-gun brig-sloops of the British Royal Navy. She saw service during the Napoleonic Wars. In 1810 she participated in an engagement that resulted in her crew qualifying for the Naval General Service Medal. The Navy sold Cherokee in 1828. She then became a merchantman trading between Liverpool and Africa. Cherokee was wrecked in August 1831 returning to England from Africa.

== Design and construction ==
Cherokee was ordered on 30 March 1807, based on a design by Henry Peake. The ship was laid down in December 1807 by John Perry at Blackwall Yard, London. As built, the ship had a burthen of 237 38/94 tons, and was 90 feet 1 5/8 inches (27.47 m) long at the gun deck, and 73 feet 8 5/8 inches (22.47 m) at the keel. She was 24 feet 7 inches (7.49 m) wide, and drew 6 feet 6 inches (1.98 m) at the bows and 9 feet 2 inches (2.79 m) aft. The ship was armed with eight 18-pounder carronades, with two 6-pounder guns mounted as bow chasers, and had a complement of 75. She was launched on 24 February 1808.

== Royal Navy ==
Commander Richard Arthur commissioned Cherokee on 12 April 1808 to operate in the English Channel. She captured the French vessels Union and Juene Emma on 2 and 7 March 1809, respectively, with proceeds from the sale of the ships, stores, and cargo being paid on board on 22 December 1809.

She took part in the Walcheren Campaign of July–December 1809, and was one of a long list of ships who received prize money for property captured at Walcheren and adjacent islands in the Scheldt between 30 July and 16 August 1809, which was paid as the ships arrived at various ports from 6 October 1812.

On 10 January 1810 Arthur made a reconnaissance of the port of Dieppe, observing seven privateer luggers anchored close to the pier head under the protection of shore batteries. At 1 a.m he took Cherokee into the port, running in between two of the vessels. He fought off an attempt by the French to board, and while under fire from cannon in the shore batteries, and from muskets in the other privateers, successfully brought out one. She proved to be Amiable Nelly, of 106 tons, armed with 16 guns, and with a crew of 60. Cherokee suffered only two men slightly wounded, while two Frenchmen were killed and eight wounded, three seriously. Arthur was rewarded for this action by being promoted to post-captain. A clasp to the Naval General Service Medal, "Cherokee 10 Jany. 1810", was awarded to surviving claimants in 1847.

Command of Cherokee then passed to Commander William Ramage. She was based at Leith to operate in the North Sea and on the coast of Norway.

- On 7 January 1811 she captured the vessels Lavens Laver and Hercules. Prize money for both was paid on board on 29 August 1812.
- On 1 May 1811, boats from Cherokee, Clio and Belette, made an attempt to cut out some galliots at Egersund, on the coast of Norway, but were thwarted by the arrival of boats from HDMS Lolland.
- On 9 October 1811 she captured a Danish privateer cutter, armed with two guns and with a crew of twenty, three days out from Bergen.
- She also captured Zeegeluk on 27 April 1811, Arve Brakart on 18 October 1811, and Envold Fortuna, Maria, and Bergen on 25 May 1812, with prize money for all being paid on Cherokee's arrival at Leith in April 1813.

Ramage appears to have retained command of Cherokee after the end of the war, until on 1 January 1817 Commander Thomas Smith assumed command of her at Leith. Smith had the misfortune of having been taken prisoner by the French during the battle of the Basque Roads in April 1809, while serving as a lieutenant in the sloop Lyra, when the boat he commanded was captured. He was held as a prisoner of war until June 1814, receiving promotion to commander on his return. In November 1818, he conveyed the Archduke Maximilian of Austria-Este to Ireland in Cherokee; in gratitude the Archduke presented him with a gold snuff box.

Commander Theobald Jones took command of Cherokee at Leith on 26 February 1819, and served on the South America Station in 1822. Finally, Commander William Keats (a nephew of Admiral Sir Richard Goodwin Keats) took command on 7 October 1822, and was based at Leith and Cork.

'Disposal: On 26 March 1828 Cherokee was laying at Deptford, where she was offered for sale by the Navy Office. She was bought by J. Crystal for £610.

== Mercantile service ==
Cherokee was first listed in the Register of Shipping (RS), and Lloyd's Register (LR) in 1829.

| Year | Master | Owner | Trade | Source |
|---|---|---|---|---|
| 1829 | Griffiths | J.Tobin | Liverpool–Africa | RS; repairs 1829 |
| 1829 | J.Griffiths | Horsfall | Liverpool–Africa | LR; raised, new deck, and small repairs 1829 |

== Fate ==
Cherokee, Houstan, master, came ashore in a fog on 27 August 1831 and was wrecked 3 nautical miles (5.6 km) south of Milford Haven, Pembrokeshire. Her crew were saved. She was on a voyage from New Calabar to Liverpool.
