= 1878 County Londonderry by-election =

UK Parliamentary by-election

A by-election was held in the county constituency of County Londonderry on 18 December 1878. It followed the death of the incumbent Liberal MP, Richard Smyth. It was won by the Liberal candidate Sir Thomas McClure.
