= 1951 Londonderry by-election =

UK parliamentary by-election

The 1951 Londonderry by-election was held on 19 May 1951 when the incumbent Ulster Unionist Party MP, Ronald Deane Ross was appointed as the Northern Ireland Government Agent in London. The Ulster Unionist candidate William Wellwood was elected unopposed. He retained the seat unopposed at the 1951 United Kingdom general election.
