= Malcolm Macnaghten =

British politician (1869–1955)

The Right Honourable Sir Malcolm Macnaghten KBE
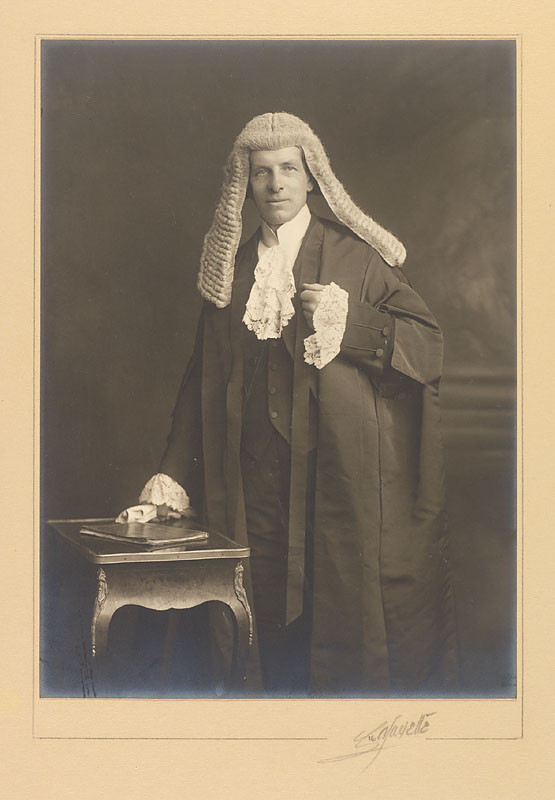

Justice of the High Court

Sir Malcolm Martin Macnaghten, KBE (12 January 1869 – 24 January 1955), was an Irish Unionist politician and judge, the fourth son of Lord Macnaghten.

== Biography ==
Malcolm Macnaghten was educated at Eton before going up to read History at Trinity College, Cambridge, being elected President of the Cambridge Union in 1890 before graduating with 1st class honours. A Cambridge Apostle, he was called to the Bar at Lincoln's Inn in 1894, becoming a Bencher in 1915 and King's Counsel (KC) in 1919.

Macnaghten sat as Member of Parliament for North Londonderry in 1922 and then for Londonderry from 1922 to 1929. He was Recorder of Colchester from 1924 to 1928, and a Judge of the High Court of Justice, King's Bench Division from 1928 to 1947.

During his time as judge, he presided over the landmark case called Rex v Bourne where a young girl became pregnant as the result of being raped to which a obstetric surgeon in London, Aleck Bourne, performed an abortion which led to him being charged under the Offences against the Person Act 1861. Macnaughten drew upon the Infant Life (Preservation) Act 1929, and asked the jury to consider the view that the doctor was "not done in good faith for the purpose only of preserving the life of the mother". He also said the probable consequences of the continuance of the pregnancy would make her "a physical or mental wreck". The case ended in the acquittal of the doctor.

Knighted (KBE) in the 1920 New Year Honours for services during World War I as Director of the Foreign Claims Office and appointed a Privy Counsellor in the 1948 New Year Honours, Macnaghten was Commissary of the University of Cambridge from 1926. He married Antonia, the eldest daughter of social reformer Charles Booth, and had three daughters, all of whom became socialists and married communists including the artist Peter Laszlo Peri, and one son. His youngest daughter, Anne, was a violinist who specialized in British composers like Benjamin Britten and founded Macnaghten Concerts.

He kept a house at Campden Hill Court, London W8, as well as an Irish residence: The End House, Portballintrae, County Antrim.

Macnaghten died in 1955, aged 86.

== Arms ==
Coat of arms of Sir Malcolm Macnaghten
| Crest A Castle embattled Gules Helm That of a Knight Escutcheon Quarterly, 1st and 4th, Argent a dexter Hand couped fesswise Proper holding a Cross Crosslet fitchée Azure; 2nd and 3rd, Argent a Castle embattled Gules Motto I Hope In God Orders Circlet of the Order of the British Empire |

== See also ==
- Rex v Bourne

Parliament of the United Kingdom
| Preceded by Hugh T. Barrie | Member of Parliament for North Londonderry; 1922–1922 | Constituency abolished |
| New constituency | Member of Parliament for Londonderry; 1922–1929 | Succeeded by Sir Ronald Deane Ross |
