= 1929 Londonderry by-election =

UK Parliamentary by-election

The 1929 Londonderry by-election was held on 29 January 1929. The by-election was held due to the appointment as High court judge of the incumbent UUP MP, Malcolm Macnaghten. It was won by the UUP candidate Ronald Deane Ross. who was unopposed.
