= Dehra Parker =

N. Irish politician (1882–1963)

The Right Honourable Dame Dehra Parker GBE
- Dame Dehra skiing with her grandson, James Chichester-Clark, in Switzerland (1931)

Minister of Health and Local Government
- In office 1949–1957
- Preceded by: William Grant
- Succeeded by: Jack Andrews

Parliamentary Secretary to the Ministry of Education
- In office 1937–1944

Member of the Northern Ireland House of Commons
- In office 1933–1960
- Preceded by: James Lenox-Conyngham Chichester-Clark
- Succeeded by: James Chichester-Clark
- Constituency: South Londonderry
- In office 1921–1929
- Preceded by: Constituency established
- Succeeded by: Constituency abolished
- Constituency: Londonderry

Personal details
- Born: 13 August 1882 Dehradun, British Raj
- Died: 30 November 1963 (aged 81) Castledawson, County Londonderry, Northern Ireland
- Party: Ulster Unionist Party
- Spouse(s): Robert Chichester (died 1921); Admiral Henry Parker
- Children: 2

Dame Dehra Parker, GBE, PC (NI) (née Kerr-Fisher; 13 August 1882 – 30 November 1963), was the longest serving female MP in the House of Commons of Northern Ireland.

== Family life ==
Dehra Kerr-Fisher was born in a military hospital in Dehra Dun, north of Delhi, India, in 1882, the only child of James Kerr-Fisher and his wife, Annie. Her father, a native of Kilrea, County Londonderry, was a successful financier. She was educated in the United States, where her father held extensive property holdings, and in Germany.

== Marriages ==
She was married twice. Her first husband was Robert Peel Dawson Spencer Chichester (d. 1921), with whom she had one son and one daughter, Robert James Spencer Chichester (1902–1920) and Marion Caroline Dehra Chichester (1904–1976). She was predeceased by her son. On 4 June 1928 she married her second husband, Henry Wise Parker.

== Political career ==
Dame Dehra was first elected as a Member of Parliament (MP) for Londonderry, as Dehra Chichester (as she was known prior to her second marriage in 1928), in the 1921 Northern Ireland general election. She stood down at the 1929 election just before her second marriage but was elected unopposed as Dehra Parker in the 15 March 1933 by-election for the South Londonderry constituency following the death of her son-in-law James Lenox-Conyngham Chichester-Clark, and served until her resignation on 15 June 1960. Her grandson, James Chichester-Clark, was elected unopposed at the subsequent by-election. He later served as the fifth Prime Minister of Northern Ireland from 1969 to 1971.

From her re-election in 1933 until her retirement in 1960, she faced opposition only once. During the 1949 Northern Ireland General Election, with anti-partition agitation a common theme across the region, she was opposed in South Londonderry by a Nationalist Party candidate, T.B. Agnew, whom she defeated. She was a Parliamentary Secretary to the Ministry of Education from 1 December 1937 to 15 March 1944. She was also Chair of the Northern Ireland General Health Services Board from 1948 to 1949. She served as Minister of Health and Local Government from 26 August 1949 to 13 March 1957 and became a member of the Privy Council of Northern Ireland in 1949, which entitled her to the style The Right Honourable. She was elevated to Dame Commander of the Order of the British Empire in the 1949 Birthday honours "for public services", having previously been appointed as an OBE, and was advanced to be a Dame Grand Cross of the Order of the British Empire (GBE) in 1957.

Her promotion to the Cabinet at the age of 67 under Sir Basil Brooke (later created The 1st Viscount Brookeborough) was part of his so-called 'reforming' premiership; his predecessor having been criticised for appointing elderly members to Cabinet. She was the first and only woman to serve in the Northern Ireland Cabinet.

== Extra-Parliamentary activities ==
Outside of parliamentary activities, Dame Dehra was a long-serving local councillor on Magherafelt Rural District Council, president of both the Northern Ireland Physical Training Association and the Girls' Training Corps, and chairman of the Ancient Monuments Advisory Committee. In 1944, Parker was appointed senior vice-chairman of the Council for the Encouragement of Music and the Arts (CEMA NI), and in 1949 she succeeded Sir David Lindsay Keir as president for CEMA, a position she held until 1960. Parker was made an honorary member of the Ulster Society of Women Artists in 1958.

== Later life ==
Dame Dehra Parker died at her home, Shanemullagh House, Castledawson, County Londonderry, on 28 November 1963, at age 81. She was interred two days later in the grounds of Christ Church, Castledawson.

Parliament of Northern Ireland
New parliament	Member of Parliament for Londonderry; 1921–1929	Constituency split
Preceded by James Lenox-Conyngham Chichester-Clark	Member of Parliament for South Londonderry; 1933–1960	Succeeded by James Chichester-Clark
Political offices
Preceded by John Hanna Robb	Parliamentary Secretary to the Ministry of Education; 1937–1944	Vacant
Preceded by William Grant	Minister of Health and Local Government; 1949–1957	Succeeded by Jack Andrews
