= 1922 North Londonderry by-election =

UK Parliamentary by-election

The 1922 North Londonderry by-election was held on 2 June 1922. The by-election was held due to the death of the incumbent UUP MP, Hugh T. Barrie. It was won by the UUP candidate Malcolm Macnaghten.
