= Sir Robert Bateson, 1st Baronet =

Irish baronet, landowner and Conservative politician (1782–1863)

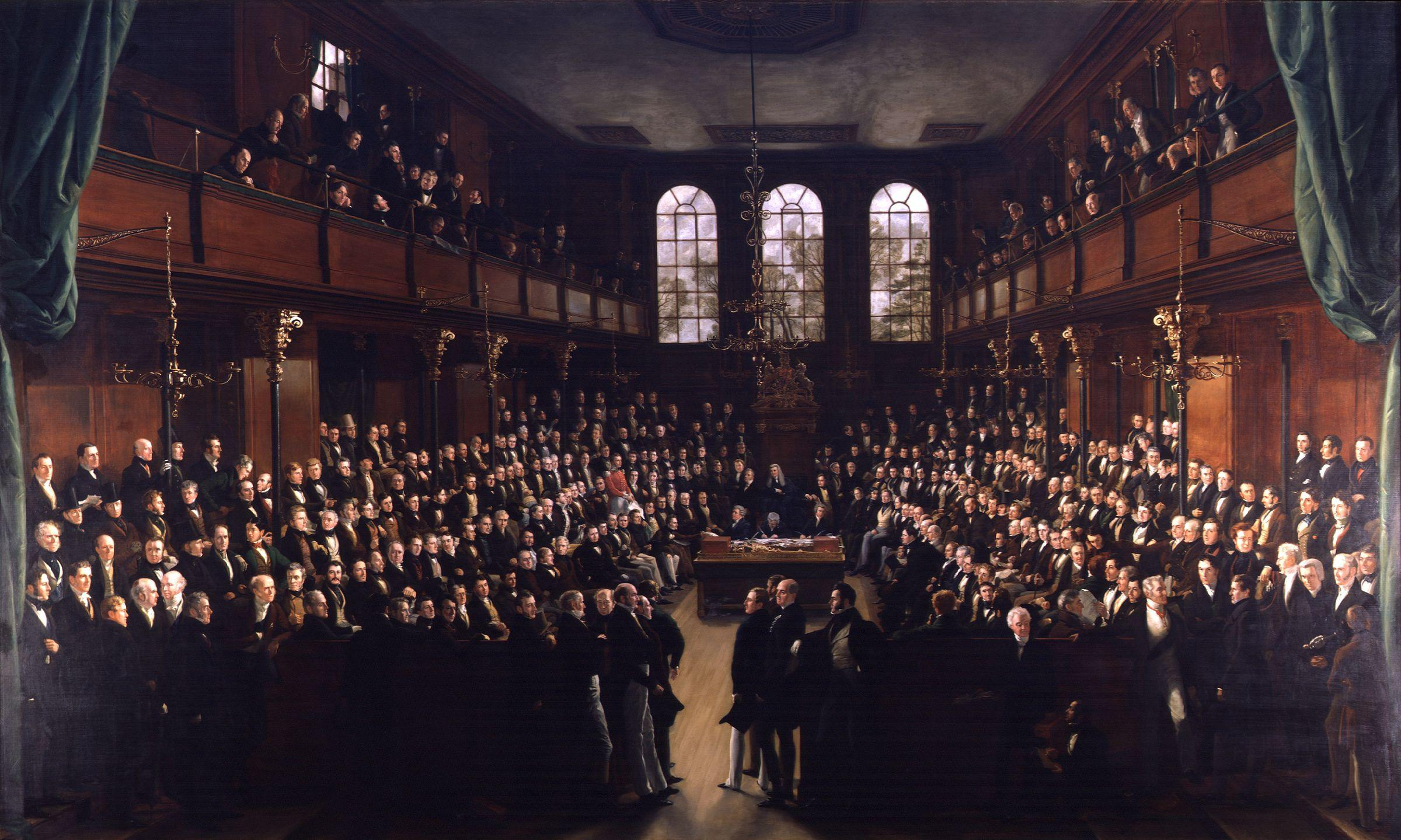

Sir Robert Bateson, 1st Baronet DL (13 March 1782 – 21 April 1863) was an Irish baronet, landowner and Conservative politician.

He was the only son of Thomas Bateson and his wife Elizabeth, youngest daughter of George Lloyd.

On 18 December 1818, he was created a baronet, of Belvoir Park, in the County of Down. Bateson entered the British House of Commons in 1830, sitting for Londonderry until 1842, when he was succeeded in the constituency by his eldest son Robert. He was a magistrate in County Down and represented it as a Deputy Lieutenant. On the 27 February 1857, the 4th Marquess of Londonderry conferred on him the honour to lay the foundation stone of the Londonderry Monument, better known today as the Scrabo Tower.

He married Catherine, the youngest daughter of Samuel Dickinson on 27 April 1811, and had by her two daughters and four sons.

In 1863, Bateson died aged 81 at his seat Belvoir Park and his son Robert having predeceased him at Jerusalem twenty years before, he was succeeded in the baronetcy by his second son Thomas, later raised to the Peerage of the United Kingdom as Baron Deramore. Bateson's youngest son George was per a special remainder heir to his brother's barony. His son, Samuel, was a first-class cricketer.

Parliament of the United Kingdom
Preceded by George Robert Dawson; Alexander Robert Stewart	Member of Parliament for Londonderry; 1830 – 1842; With: Theobald Jones	Succeeded by Theobald Jones; Robert Bateson
Baronetage of the United Kingdom
New creation	Baronet (of Belvoir Park); 1818 – 1863	Succeeded by Thomas Bateson
