= Baron Deramore =

Title in the Peerage of the United Kingdom

Baron Deramore, of Belvoir in the County of Down, was a title in the Peerage of the United Kingdom. It was created on 18 November 1885 for the Conservative Member of Parliament Sir Thomas Bateson, 2nd Baronet. His father Robert Bateson had been created a baronet, of Belvoir Park in the County of Down, on 18 December 1818 in the Baronetage of the United Kingdom. The barony was created with special remainder to the first Baron's younger brother George, who succeeded him as second Baron.

He was the husband of Mary Elizabeth de Yarburgh (died 1884), daughter and heiress of George John de Yarburgh, of Heslington Hall, near York, and assumed in 1876 by Royal licence the additional surname of de Yarburgh after the death of his father-in-law. In 1892 Lord Deramore assumed the surname of Bateson after, instead of before that of de Yarburgh. He was succeeded by his son, the third Baron. He served as Lord-Lieutenant of the East Riding of Yorkshire from 1924 to 1936. On his death the titles passed to his younger brother, the fourth Baron.

The family seat of Heslington Hall was acquired by the University of York in 1962 and now forms part of its campus. The Hall was lived in by the family of the Barons Deramore until ca 1940, when it was vacated in favour of No. 4 Group RAF.

== Bateson baronets, of Belvoir Park (1818) ==
- Sir Robert Bateson, 1st Baronet (1782–1863)
- Sir Thomas Bateson, 2nd Baronet (1819–1890) (created Baron Deramore in 1885)

Coat of arms of Bateson of Belvoir Park
Crest A bat's wing Sable Escutcheon Argent, three bats' wings sable, on a chief Gules, a lion passant Or Motto Nocte volamus.

== Barons Deramore (1885) ==
- Thomas Bateson, 1st Baron Deramore (1819–1890)
- George William de Yarburgh-Bateson, 2nd Baron Deramore (1823–1893)
- Robert Wilfrid de Yarburgh-Bateson, 3rd Baron Deramore (1865–1936)
- George de Yarburgh-Bateson, 4th Baron Deramore (1870–1943)
- Stephen de Yarburgh-Bateson, 5th Baron Deramore (1903–1964)
- Richard Arthur de Yarburgh-Bateson, 6th Baron Deramore (1911–2006)

Coat of arms of Barons Deramore, de Yarburgh-Bateson
Coronet Baron's coronet Crest 1st, a bat’s wing as in the arms ; 2nd, a falcon close Or, preying on a mallard Proper, and charged with a cross-crosslet Azure. Escutcheon Quarterly, 1st and 4th: Argent, three bats’ wings Sable, on a chief Gules, a lion Passant Or (Bateson); 2nd and 3rd: per pale Argent and Azure, a chevron between three chaplets, in middle chief point a cross-crosslet, all counter-changed, de Yarburgh Supporters Two lions Or, each gorged with a collar gemel Gules, and pendant therefrom a shield Ermine, the dexter shield charged with a bat’s wing as in the arms, and the sinister with a raven Sable. Motto Non est sine pulvere palma (The prize is not won without dust)

== Notes ==
Baronetage of the United Kingdom
Preceded by Croft baronets	Bateson baronets of Belvoir Park; 18 December 1818	Succeeded by Hamilton baronets
