= Thomas Bateson, 1st Baron Deramore =

British peer and politician (1819–1890)

The Right Honourable The Lord Deramore DL
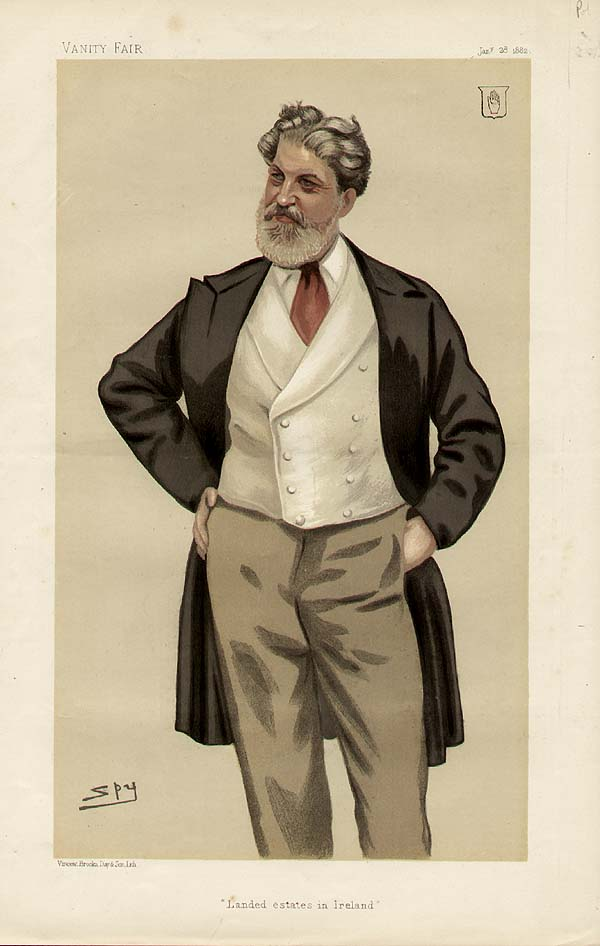

Lord of the Treasury
- In office 23 February 1852 – 19 December 1852
- Monarch: Victoria
- Prime Minister: The Earl of Derby

Personal details
- Born: 4 June 1819
- Died: 1 December 1890 (aged 71)
- Party: Conservative
- Spouse: Hon. Caroline Elizabeth Anne Rice-Trevor
- Education: Royal Military College, Sandhurst

Thomas Bateson, 1st Baron Deramore DL (4 June 1819 – 1 December 1890), known as Sir Thomas Bateson, 2nd Bt from 1863 until 1885, was a British peer and Conservative Party politician.

== Early life ==
Bateson was the son of Sir Robert Bateson, 1st Baronet, of Belvoir Park, County Down and Catharine Dickson. After attending the Royal Military College, Sandhurst he served as an officer in the 13th Light Dragoons. He attained the rank of captain.

== Politics ==
Bateson was first elected to the House of Commons in 1844 as a Conservative Member of Parliament (MP) for County Londonderry, but he resigned this seat in 1857. He was returned again in 1864 as a member for Devizes, which seat he retained until 1885. Bateson served as a Junior Lord of the Treasury in Lord Derby's short-lived 1852 protectionist government.

He had succeeded to his father's baronetcy following his death in 1863. In 1885 he was created Baron Deramore, of Belvoir, in the County of Down in the Peerage of the United Kingdom. As he had no sons, both the baronetcy and the barony passed by special remainder to his younger brother, George, who became the second baron and third baronet. Bateson served as a deputy lieutenant for Down.

== Marriage and issue ==
On 24 February 1849 he married Hon. Caroline Elizabeth Anne Rice-Trevor, the second daughter and co-heiress of George Rice-Trevor, 4th Baron Dynevor. They had two daughters:

- Hon. Eva Frances Caroline Bateson (died 18 May 1940), married David Alfred Ker
- Hon. Kathleen Mary Bateson (died 20 Jul 1935), married Walter Randolph Farquhar, second son of Sir Walter Farquhar, 3rd Baronet.

Parliament of the United Kingdom
Preceded by Robert Bateson; Theobald Jones	Member of Parliament for County Londonderry; 1844–1857; With: Theobald Jones	Succeeded by Theobald Jones; James Johnston Clark
Preceded by William Addington; Christopher Griffith	Member of Parliament for Devizes; 1864–1885; With: Christopher Griffith 1864–1868 reduced to one seat in 1868	Succeeded by Walter Long
Political offices
Preceded by Sir William Gibson Craig, Bt; Henry Rich; Richard Bellew	Junior Lord of the Treasury; 1852; With: Marquess of Chandos; Lord Henry Lennox	Succeeded by Lord Alfred Hervey; Lord Elcho; John Sadleir
Peerage of the United Kingdom
New creation	Baron Deramore; 1885–1890	Succeeded by George de Yarburgh-Bateson
Baronetage of the United Kingdom
Preceded by Robert Bateson	Baronet (of Belvoir Park); 1863–1890	Succeeded by George de Yarburgh-Bateson
