= Moyola Park Golf Club =

Coordinates: 54°46′53″N 6°33′53″W

Moyola Park Golf Club is an 18-hole championship golf course set in 130 acres (53 hectares) of mature wooded parkland in the Shanemullagh Estate at Castledawson, County Londonderry, Northern Ireland. It was founded in 1977 by James Chichester-Clark (former Prime Minister of Northern Ireland) and his wife on family land at Moyola Park. The River Moyola runs through the course.

The club has recently completed an extensive development programme.
