= William Ross (Unionist politician) =

Northern Irish politician

President of the Traditional Unionist Voice
- Incumbent
- Assumed office 4 June 2008
- Leader: Jim Allister
- Preceded by: Position created

Member of Parliament for East Londonderry Londonderry (Feb 1974–1983)
- In office 28 February 1974 – 14 May 2001
- Preceded by: Robin Chichester-Clark
- Succeeded by: Gregory Campbell

Personal details
- Party: Traditional Unionist Voice (since 2007)
- Other political affiliations: Ulster Unionist Party (until 2007)
- Spouse: Christina Ross (m. 1974)
- Children: 4
- Occupation: Farmer, politician

William Ross is a Northern Irish unionist politician, serving as President of the Traditional Unionist Voice (TUV) since 2008. He served as the Ulster Unionist Party (UUP) Member of Parliament (MP) for Londonderry (later East Londonderry) from February 1974 until 2001. He was one of the UUP members opposed to the Good Friday Agreement.

== Career ==
For some years he was a member of the Conservative Monday Club (which followed the Tory tradition of being Conservative and Unionist). In September 1982 he was chairman of the club's Northern Ireland Committee when it published a Policy Paper entitled Proposals for a Constitutional Settlement [for Ulster].

He served as Chief Whip of the Ulster Unionist Parliamentary Party from 1987 to 1995. In an attempt to derail multi-party talks initiated by Secretary of State for Northern Ireland Peter Brooke, in February 1990 Ross unsuccessfully introduced a Private Member's Bill, the Northern Ireland Act 1974 (Amendment) Bill, to provide that laws for Northern Ireland may not be made by (non-amendable) Orders-in-Council but by (amendable) Bills introduced into the United Kingdom Parliament. He repeatedly called on the Conservative Government to implement its 1979 Conservative general election manifesto commitment to "establish one or more elected regional councils with a wide range of powers over local services" (in Northern Ireland), which had been drafted by the then UUP Leader Jim Molyneaux and adopted by Airey Neave as Shadow Secretary of State for Northern Ireland in 1978.

Following Molyneaux's retirement as UUP Leader, Ross unsuccessfully stood for the leadership of the Ulster Unionist Party in September 1995 and, although a close confidant and supporter of Molyneaux throughout the latter's leadership of the UUP, quickly became a very vocal opponent of the policies and style of newly elected UUP Leader David Trimble.

In June 2008, it was announced as the party president of the Traditional Unionist Voice (TUV).

William Ross stood for the TUV in the 2010 UK general election in the East Londonderry constituency.

Parliament of the United Kingdom
Preceded by Robin Chichester-Clark	Member of Parliament for Londonderry; 1974–1983	constituency abolished
New constituency	Member of Parliament for East Londonderry; 1983–2001	Succeeded by Gregory Campbell
