= Arthur Doherty =

Member of the Northern Ireland Assembly for Londonderry, East
- In office 25 June 1998 – 1 September 2002
- Preceded by: New Creation
- Succeeded by: Michael Coyle

Mayor of Limavady
- In office 1993–1994

Member of Limavady Borough Council
- In office 15 May 1985 – 7 June 2001
- Preceded by: District created
- Succeeded by: Gerry Mullan
- Constituency: Bellarena
- In office 18 May 1977 – 15 May 1985
- Preceded by: James Boylan
- Succeeded by: District abolished
- Constituency: Limavady Area A

Member of the Northern Ireland Forum for East Londonderry
- In office 30 May 1996 – 25 April 1998

Personal details
- Born: 19 January 1932 County Donegal, Ireland
- Died: 6 February 2003 (aged 71)
- Party: Social Democratic and Labour Party

Arthur Doherty (19 January 1932 – 6 February 2003) was a Social Democratic and Labour Party (SDLP) politician, who was a Member of the Northern Ireland Assembly (MLA) for East Londonderry from 1998 to 2002.

== Background ==
Born in County Donegal, Doherty studied in Strabane, then at St Columb's College in Derry before becoming a teacher. He later studied Education and Arts and Design at the University of Ulster and became active in the Irish National Teachers Organisation.

=== Political career ===
Doherty was involved in the civil rights movement, and joined the Social Democratic and Labour Party (SDLP), later serving on its executive. He was elected to Limavady Borough Council in 1977, serving as Mayor of Limavady in 1993. In 1996, he was elected to the Northern Ireland Forum representing East Londonderry, and he held his seat at the 1998 Northern Ireland Assembly election. He resigned from the Assembly with effect from 1 September 2002 and was replaced by Michael Coyle. He died the following year, after a short illness.

Northern Ireland Forum
New forum	Member for East Londonderry; 1996–1998	Forum dissolved
Northern Ireland Assembly
New assembly	MLA for East Londonderry; 1998–2002	Succeeded by Michael Coyle
