= Londonderry (UK Parliament constituency) =

UK constituency in Ireland and Northern Ireland

- Former county constituency for the House of Commons
- County: County Londonderry

1801–1885
- Seats: 2
- Created from: County Londonderry (IHC)
- Replaced by: North Derry; South Derry

1922–1983
- Seats: 1
- Created from: Londonderry City; North Derry; South Derry
- Replaced by: East Londonderry; Foyle

County Londonderry or Londonderry is a former county constituency in the House of Commons of the United Kingdom. It was a two-member constituency in Ireland from 1801 to 1885 and a single-member constituency in Northern Ireland from 1922 to 1983.

== History and boundaries ==
County Londonderry had been represented by two seats in the Irish House of Commons. From 1801, under the Acts of Union 1800, it was represented by a county constituency with two MPs in the United Kingdom House of Commons. It consisted of County Londonderry, except for the parliamentary boroughs of Coleraine and Londonderry City. The borough of Newtown Limavady lost its separate representation in 1801.

At the 1885 general election, under the Redistribution of Seats Act 1885, Coleraine lost its separate representation. The county was split between the divisions of North Derry and South Derry.

In 1922, following the establishment of the Parliament of Northern Ireland, the number of seats in Northern Ireland at Westminster was cut from 30 to 13 under the Government of Ireland Act 1920. Londonderry was created as a single-seat constituency, succeeding Londonderry City, North Derry and South Derry, comprising the administrative county of Londonderry and the County Borough of Londonderry. A five-seat constituency of Londonderry was also created for the House of Commons of Northern Ireland.

From 1950 onwards, under the Representation of the People Act 1948, the rural district of Magherafelt in the south of the county was transferred to the new Mid Ulster constituency.

In 1983 the number of seats for Northern Ireland was increased from 12 to 17 and Londonderry was split in two, forming Foyle and East Londonderry.

== Politics and history of the constituency ==
From its recreation in 1922, Londonderry had a unionist majority, though by the 1970s the nationalist vote was approaching 40% in some elections.

In 1951, it was one of the last four seats to be uncontested in a United Kingdom general election.

In 1974 the Ulster Unionist Party repudiated the Sunningdale Agreement and so did not reselect Robin Chichester-Clark, who had been a Minister in the government of Edward Heath. Instead they ran William Ross, who held the seat until the 1983 general election. He was then elected for the new East Londonderry constituency.

== Members of Parliament ==
=== 1801–1885 ===
Election	First member	First party	Second member	Second party
1801	Hon. Charles Stewart (Note: Known as Sir Charles Stewart from 1813.)	Tory	Vacant	
1801 by-election	Hon. Charles Stewart	Tory	Sir George Hill, 2nd Bt	Tory
1802	Hon. Charles Stewart	Tory	Lord George Beresford	Tory
1812	Hon. Charles Stewart	Tory	Hon. William Ponsonby	Tory
1814 by-election	Alexander Stewart	Tory	Hon. William Ponsonby	Tory
1815 by-election	Alexander Stewart	Tory	George Robert Dawson	Tory
1818	Alexander Robert Stewart	Tory	George Robert Dawson	Tory
1830	Theobald Jones	Tory	Sir Robert Bateson, 1st Bt	Tory
1834	Theobald Jones	Conservative	Sir Robert Bateson, 1st Bt	Conservative
1842 by-election	Theobald Jones	Conservative	Robert Bateson	Conservative
1844 by-election	Theobald Jones	Conservative	Thomas Bateson	Conservative
1857 by-election	Theobald Jones	Conservative	James Johnston Clark	Conservative
1857	Samuel MacCurdy Greer	Radical	James Johnston Clark	Conservative
1859	Robert Peel Dawson	Conservative	Sir Frederick Heygate, 2nd Bt	Conservative
1874	Richard Smyth	Liberal	Hugh Law	Liberal
1878 by-election	Sir Thomas McClure, 1st Bt	Liberal	Hugh Law	Liberal
1881 by-election	Sir Thomas McClure, 1st Bt	Liberal	Andrew Porter	Liberal
1884 by-election	Sir Thomas McClure, 1st Bt	Liberal	Samuel Walker	Liberal
1885	Constituency abolished: see North Londonderry & South Londonderry			

=== 1922–1983 ===
Election	Member	Party
1922	Sir Malcolm Macnaghten	Ulster Unionist
1929 by-election	Sir Ronald Ross	Ulster Unionist
1951 by-election	William Wellwood	Ulster Unionist
1955	Robin Chichester-Clark	Ulster Unionist
February 1974	William Ross	Ulster Unionist
1983	Constituency abolished: see Foyle & East Londonderry	

== Westminster elections ==
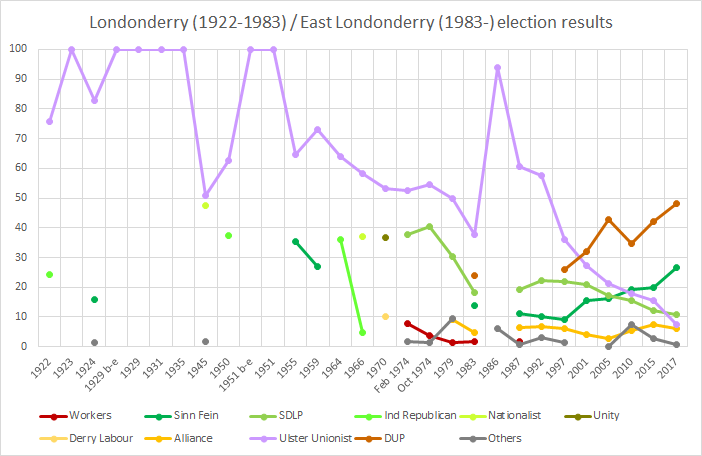
Londonderry / East Londonderry election results

=== Elections in the 1830s ===
1830 general election: Londonderry (2 seats)
Party	Candidate	Votes	%
Tory	Robert Bateson, Snr.	Unopposed	
Tory	Theobald Jones	Unopposed	
Registered electors		866	
Tory hold			
Tory hold			

1831 general election: Londonderry (2 seats)
Party	Candidate	Votes	%
Tory	Robert Bateson, Snr.	631	38.7
Tory	Theobald Jones	585	35.9
Whig	John Byng	382	23.4
Tory	John Richard James Hart	33	2.0
Majority		203	12.5
Turnout		c. 816	c. 92.9
Registered electors		878	
Tory hold			
Tory hold			

1832 general election: Londonderry (2 seats)
Party	Candidate	Votes	%
Tory	Robert Bateson, Snr.	Unopposed	
Tory	Theobald Jones	Unopposed	
Registered electors		2,172	
Tory hold			
Tory hold			

1835 general election: Londonderry (2 seats)
Party	Candidate	Votes	%
Conservative	Robert Bateson, Snr.	Unopposed	
Conservative	Theobald Jones	Unopposed	
Registered electors		2,658	
Conservative hold			
Conservative hold			

1837 general election: Londonderry (2 seats)
Party	Candidate	Votes	%
Conservative	Robert Bateson, Snr.	Unopposed	
Conservative	Theobald Jones	Unopposed	
Registered electors		2,843	
Conservative hold			
Conservative hold			

=== Elections in the 1840s ===
1841 general election: Londonderry (2 seats)
Party	Candidate	Votes	%	±%
Conservative	Robert Bateson, Snr.	Unopposed		
Conservative	Theobald Jones	Unopposed		
Registered electors		1,718		
Conservative hold				
Conservative hold				

By-election, 26 May 1842: Londonderry
Party	Candidate	Votes	%	±%
Conservative	Robert Bateson, Jnr.	Unopposed		
Conservative hold				

- Caused by Bateson's resignation by accepting the office of Steward of the Chiltern Hundreds

By-election, 13 March 1844: Londonderry
Party	Candidate	Votes	%	±%
Conservative	Thomas Bateson	Unopposed		
Conservative hold				

- Caused by Bateson's death

1847 general election: Londonderry (2 seats)
Party	Candidate	Votes	%	±%
Conservative	Thomas Bateson	Unopposed		
Conservative	Theobald Jones	Unopposed		
Registered electors		4,663		
Conservative hold				
Conservative hold				

=== Elections in the 1850s ===
By-election, 13 March 1852: Londonderry
Party	Candidate	Votes	%	±%
Conservative	Thomas Bateson	Unopposed		
Conservative hold				

- Caused by Bateson's appointment as a Lord Commissioner of the Treasury

1852 general election: Londonderry (2 seats)
Party	Candidate	Votes	%	±%
Conservative	Thomas Bateson	2,098	38.0	N/A
Conservative	Theobald Jones	1,909	34.6	N/A
Radical	Samuel MacCurdy Greer	1,518	27.5	New
Majority		391	7.1	N/A
Turnout		3,522 (est)	81.8 (est)	N/A
Registered electors		4,305		
Conservative hold		Swing	N/A	
Conservative hold		Swing	N/A	

By-election, 9 March 1857: Londonderry
Party	Candidate	Votes	%	±%
Conservative	James Johnston Clark	2,600	64.1	−8.5
Radical	Samuel MacCurdy Greer	1,457	35.9	+8.4
Majority		1,143	28.2	+21.1
Turnout		4,057	79.8	−2.0
Registered electors		5,081		
Conservative hold		Swing	−8.5	

- Caused by Bateson's resignation.

1857 general election: Londonderry (2 seats)
Party	Candidate	Votes	%	±%
Conservative	James Johnston Clark	2,404	37.5	−0.5
Radical	Samuel MacCurdy Greer	2,339	36.4	+8.9
Conservative	Henry Bruce	1,676	26.1	−8.5
Turnout		3,210 (est)	63.2 (est)	−18.6
Registered electors		5,081		
Majority		65	1.1	−6.0
Conservative hold		Swing	+2.5	
Majority		663	10.3	N/A
Radical gain from Conservative		Swing	+9.0	

1859 general election: Londonderry (2 seats)
Party	Candidate	Votes	%	±%
Conservative	Robert Peel Dawson	2,628	38.2	+0.7
Conservative	Frederick Heygate	2,468	35.8	+9.7
Liberal	Samuel MacCurdy Greer	1,790	26.0	−10.4
Majority		678	9.8	+8.7
Turnout		4,338 (est)	83.8 (est)	+20.6
Registered electors		5,178		
Conservative hold		Swing	+3.2	
Conservative gain from Liberal		Swing	+7.7	

=== Elections in the 1860s ===
1865 general election: Londonderry (2 seats)
Party	Candidate	Votes	%	±%
Conservative	Robert Peel Dawson	Unopposed		
Conservative	Frederick Heygate	Unopposed		
Registered electors		5,512		
Conservative hold				
Conservative hold				

1868 general election: Londonderry (2 seats)
Party	Candidate	Votes	%	±%
Conservative	Robert Peel Dawson	Unopposed		
Conservative	Frederick Heygate	Unopposed		
Registered electors		5,582		
Conservative hold				
Conservative hold				

=== Elections in the 1870s ===
1874 general election: Londonderry (2 seats)
Party	Candidate	Votes	%	±%
Liberal	Richard Smyth	2,988	33.8	New
Liberal	Hugh Law	2,701	30.6	New
Conservative	Robert Jackson Alexander	1,747	19.8	N/A
Conservative	John Barré Beresford	1,402	15.9	N/A
Majority		954	10.8	N/A
Turnout		4,419 (est)	82.4 (est)	N/A
Registered electors		5,362		
Liberal gain from Conservative		Swing	N/A	
Liberal gain from Conservative		Swing	N/A	

By-election, 18 Dec 1878: Londonderry (1 seat)
Party	Candidate	Votes	%	±%
Liberal	Thomas McClure	2,479	56.9	−7.5
Conservative	Samuel Maxwell Alexander	1,878	43.1	+7.4
Majority		601	13.8	+3.0
Turnout		4,357	76.3	−6.1
Registered electors		5,714		
Liberal hold		Swing	−7.5	

- Caused by Smyth's death.

=== Elections in the 1880s ===
1880 general election: Londonderry (2 seats)
Party	Candidate	Votes	%	±%
Liberal	Hugh Law	3,012	37.5	+6.9
Liberal	Thomas McClure	2,912	36.3	+2.5
Conservative	Samuel Maxwell Alexander	2,107	26.2	−9.5
Majority		805	10.1	−0.7
Turnout		5,069 (est)	86.6 (est)	+4.2
Registered electors		5,853		
Liberal hold		Swing	+5.8	
Liberal hold		Swing	+3.6	

By-election, 19 May 1880: Londonderry (1 seat)
Party	Candidate	Votes	%	±%
Liberal	Hugh Law	Unopposed		
Registered electors		5,853		
Liberal hold				

- Caused by Law's appointment as Attorney-General for Ireland

By-election, 6 Dec 1881: Londonderry (1 seat)
Party	Candidate	Votes	%	±%
Liberal	Andrew Porter	2,701	56.1	−17.7
Conservative	Samuel Wilson	2,054	42.7	+16.5
Home Rule	Charles John Dempsey	56	1.2	New
Majority		647	13.4	+3.3
Turnout		4,811	81.6	−5.0 (est)
Registered electors		5,896		
Liberal hold		Swing	−17.1	

- Caused by Law's appointment as Lord Chancellor of Ireland

By-election, 10 Jan 1884: Londonderry (1 seat)
Party	Candidate	Votes	%	±%
Liberal	Samuel Walker	Unopposed		
Registered electors		5,798		
Liberal hold				

- Caused by Porter's appointment as Master of the Rolls

=== Elections in the 1920s ===
1922 general election: Londonderry
Party	Candidate	Votes	%	±%
UUP	Malcolm Macnaghten	30,743	75.7	
Ind. Nationalist	Edmund Loftus MacNaghten	9,861	24.3	
Majority		20,882	51.4	
Turnout		40,604	63.9	
UUP win (new seat)				

- anti-partition

1923 general election: Londonderry
Party	Candidate	Votes	%	±%
UUP	Malcolm Macnaghten	Unopposed		
Registered electors				
UUP hold				

1924 general election: Londonderry
Party	Candidate	Votes	%	±%
UUP	Malcolm Macnaghten	30,875	82.9	N/A
Sinn Féin	Charles MacWhinney	5,869	15.8	New
Ind. Unionist	William Galt	517	1.4	New
Majority		25,006	67.1	N/A
Turnout		37,261	59.1	N/A
UUP hold		Swing	N/A	

1929 Londonderry by-election
Party	Candidate	Votes	%	±%
UUP	Ronald Deane Ross	Unopposed		
Registered electors				
UUP hold				

1929 general election: Londonderry
Party	Candidate	Votes	%	±%
UUP	Ronald Deane Ross	Unopposed		
Registered electors				
UUP hold				

=== Elections in the 1930s ===
1931 general election: Londonderry
Party	Candidate	Votes	%	±%
UUP	Ronald Deane Ross	Unopposed		
Registered electors				
UUP hold				

1935 general election: Londonderry
Party	Candidate	Votes	%	±%
UUP	Ronald Deane Ross	Unopposed		
Registered electors				
UUP hold				

=== Elections in the 1940s ===
1945 general election: Londonderry
Party	Candidate	Votes	%	±%
UUP	Ronald Ross	40,214	50.8	N/A
Nationalist	Denis Cavanagh	37,561	47.4	New
NI Labour	Milton Gordon	1,471	1.9	New
Majority		2,653	3.4	N/A
Turnout		79,246	88.1	N/A
UUP hold		Swing	N/A	

=== Elections in the 1950s ===
1950 general election: Londonderry
Party	Candidate	Votes	%	±%
UUP	Ronald Ross	36,602	62.6	+11.8
Ind. Republican	Hugh McAteer	21,880	37.4	New
Majority		14,722	25.2	+21.8
Turnout		58,482	80.7	−7.4
UUP hold		Swing		

In the 1951 Londonderry by-election and the 1951 United Kingdom general election, William Wellwood was elected unopposed.

1951 Londonderry by-election
Party	Candidate	Votes	%	±%
UUP	William Wellwood	Unopposed		
Registered electors				
UUP hold				

1951 general election: Londonderry
Party	Candidate	Votes	%	±%
UUP	William Wellwood	Unopposed		
Registered electors				
UUP hold				

1955 general election: Londonderry
Party	Candidate	Votes	%	±%
UUP	Robin Chichester-Clark	35,673	64.5	N/A
Sinn Féin	Manus Canning	19,640	35.5	New
Majority		16,033	29.0	N/A
Turnout		55,313	77.6	N/A
UUP hold		Swing	N/A	

1959 general election: Londonderry
Party	Candidate	Votes	%	±%
UUP	Robin Chichester-Clark	37,529	73.0	+8.5
Sinn Féin	Manus Canning	13,872	27.0	−8.5
Majority		23,657	46.0	+17.0
Turnout		51,401	70.2	−7.4
UUP hold		Swing	+8.5	

=== Elections in the 1960s ===
1964 general election: Londonderry
Party	Candidate	Votes	%	±%
UUP	Robin Chichester-Clark	37,700	64.1	−8.9
Ind. Republican	Hugh McAteer	21,123	35.9	New
Majority		16,577	28.2	−17.8
Turnout		58,823	76.5	+6.3
UUP hold		Swing		

1966 general election: Londonderry
Party	Candidate	Votes	%	±%
UUP	Robin Chichester-Clark	34,729	58.1	−6.0
Nationalist	Paddy Gormley	22,167	37.1	New
Ind. Republican	Neil Gillespie	2,860	4.8	−31.1
Majority		12,562	21.0	−7.2
Turnout		59,756	76.4	−0.1
UUP hold		Swing		

=== Elections in the 1970s ===
1970 general election: Londonderry
Party	Candidate	Votes	%	±%
UUP	Robin Chichester-Clark	39,141	53.1	−5.0
Unity	Eddie McAteer	27,006	36.6	New
Derry Labour	Eamonn McCann	7,565	10.3	New
Majority		12,135	16.5	−4.5
Turnout		73,712	81.6	+5.2
UUP hold		Swing	N/A	

February 1974 general election: Londonderry
Party	Candidate	Votes	%	±%
UUP	William Ross	33,060	52.7	−0.4
SDLP	Hugh Logue	23,670	37.7	New
Republican Clubs	Michael Montgomery	4,889	7.8	New
Independent	Richard Foster	1,162	1.9	New
Majority		9,390	15.0	−1.5
Turnout		62,781	68.1	−13.5
UUP hold		Swing		

October 1974 general election: Londonderry
Party	Candidate	Votes	%	±%
UUP	William Ross	35,138	54.4	+1.7
SDLP	John Hume	26,118	40.4	+2.7
Republican Clubs	Michael Montgomery	2,530	3.9	−3.9
Independent	Richard Foster	846	1.3	−0.6
Majority		9,020	14.0	−1.0
Turnout		64,632	69.3	+1.2
UUP hold		Swing		

1979 general election: Londonderry
Party	Candidate	Votes	%	±%
UUP	William Ross	31,592	49.7	−4.7
SDLP	Hugh Logue	19,185	30.2	−10.2
Alliance	Arthur Barr	5,830	9.2	New
Irish Independence	Fergus McAteer	5,489	8.6	New
Republican Clubs	Eamonn Melaugh	888	1.4	−2.5
Independent Labour	William Webster	639	1.0	New
Majority		12,407	19.5	+5.5
Turnout		63,623	67.1	−2.2
UUP hold		Swing		
