= Castledawson =

Village in County Londonderry, Northern Ireland

Coordinates: 54.778°N 6.556°W

Castledawson: Irish: An Seanmhullach
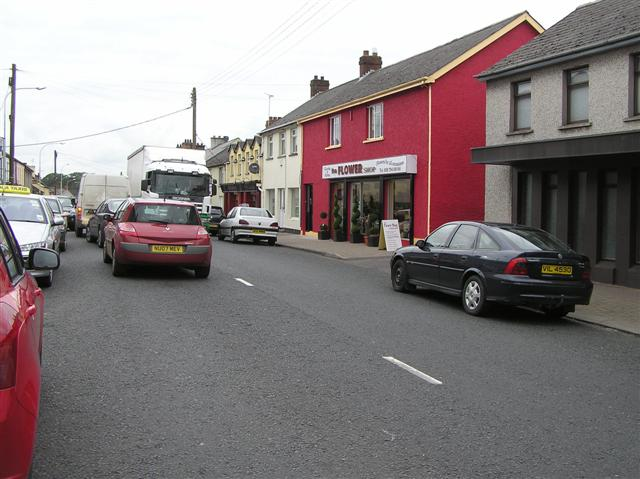
- Castledawson Main Street

- Location within Northern Ireland
- Population: 2,289 (2011 Census)
  - Belfast: 35 mi (56 km)
- District: Magherafelt
- County: County Londonderry
- Country: Northern Ireland
- Sovereign state: United Kingdom
- Post town: MAGHERAFELT
- Postcode district: BT45
- Dialling code: 028
- Police: Northern Ireland
- Fire: Northern Ireland
- Ambulance: Northern Ireland
- UK Parliament: Mid Ulster
- NI Assembly: Mid Ulster

Castledawson is a village in County Londonderry, Northern Ireland. It is mostly within the townland of Shanemullagh (from Irish an Seanmhullach 'the old hilltop', IPA:[ˈanˠˈʃanˠˌwʊl̪ˠəx]), about four miles from the north-western shore of Lough Neagh, and near the market town of Magherafelt. In the 2011 census, it had a population of 2,289.

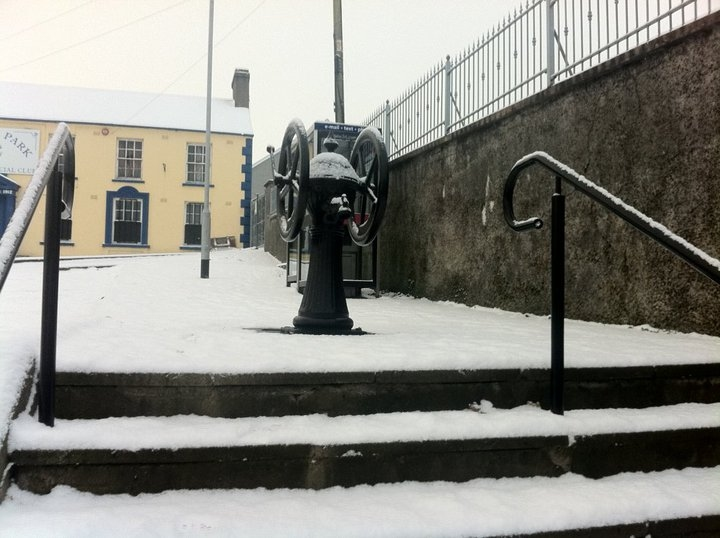
The old water pump at "the gravel", Main Street

== History ==
The village sits on the River Moyola and was originally called "Dawson's Bridge". The bridge that crossed the river here was once the largest single span stone bridge in Ireland. The village was named after its 'castle' (actually a large manor house) built by Joshua Dawson in 1713. He was Chief Secretary for Ireland and founded the village in 1710. The Dawson estate, Shanemullagh, shares its name with the original townland name. The Dawson family also founded Christ Church, on the edge of that estate, in the early 18th century.

On 29 June 1912, a large group of Ancient Order of Hibernians members, allegedly drunk after having held a parade, clashed with a party of Presbyterian Sunday School children in Castledawson, who were returning from their annual excursion, in what became known as the Castledawson Incident. The prominent Presbyterian reverend James Armour laid the blame for the incident on alcohol and "the mad Orangemen of the locality," who he believed may have set up the incident. The response to this incident saw rioting in Belfast that resulted in roughly 2,000 Catholic shipyard workers and 500 Protestant Home Rulers being violently driven from their jobs at the Workman and Clarke shipyard.

In March 1922, during the Irish War of Independence, the Irish Republican Army shot dead an off-duty Special Constable while carrying out a bomb attack on the Moyola Bridge at Castledawson.

In 1943, Nestlé built and opened a factory that made sweetened condensed milk. However, it was closed in the 1970s. Today it is the home of the award-winning Ditty's Bakery and Moyola Precision Engineering, a noted innovator of aerospace components.

The River Moyola is popular with anglers and has managed stocks of salmon (but also has perch, eel, trout, bream and pike). Dominating the horizon to the south-west of the village is a dramatic ráth.

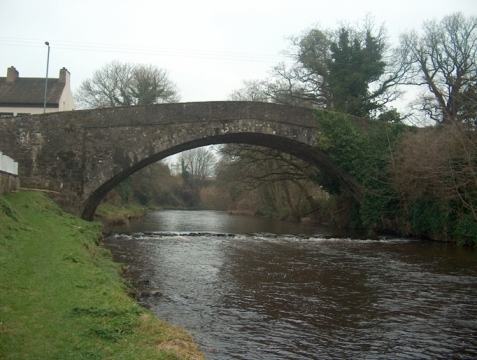
Stone bridge at Bridge Street

== People ==
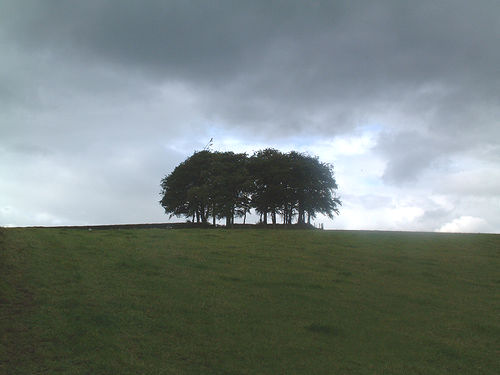
An ancient ráth at the southern edge of Castledawson

Famous natives have included:

- James Chichester-Clark, a direct descendant of the Dawsons, who was the Prime Minister of Northern Ireland from 1969 to 1971.
- Marian Donnelly, former President of the Workers' Party, was born in Castledawson in 1938.
- Ciaran Gribbin, singer-songwriter and producer
- Seamus Heaney, Irish poet, playwright and translator, was born near Castledawson in 1939.

== Transport ==
Castledawson railway station opened on 10 November 1856, closed for passenger traffic on 28 August 1950, and finally closed altogether on 1 October 1959.

The main A6 Belfast to Derry road passed through Castledawson from 1971, when the nearby Castledawson roundabout was built, in anticipation of the completion of the M22, which was never forthcoming, until 1992, when it was finally bypassed by a single-carriageway A6 upgrade. This section is currently being dualled, marking the end of a 47-year wait for the high-quality bypass it was promised, all those decades ago.

== Education ==
- Castledawson Primary School
- New Row Saint Patrick's Primary School

== Sport ==
Castledawson is home to the association football club Moyola Park, the Gaelic Athletic Association club St Malachys G.A.C. Castledawson and the eighteen hole Moyola golf club.

== 2011 census ==
According to the 2011 census, Castledawson has 3,329 residents. 53.44% of the Castledawson ward were Catholic, while 43.47% were Protestant.

In terms of National Identity, 8 choices were provided and the breakdown is as follows

Northern Ireland Census 2011
National Identity	%
British only	38.45%
Irish only	27.04%
Northern Irish only	24.48%
British and Irish only	0.27%
British and Northern Irish only	4.18%
Irish and Northern Irish only	2.01%
British, Irish and Northern Irish only	0.39%
Other	3.18%
