= Laurence Peel =

British Tory politician

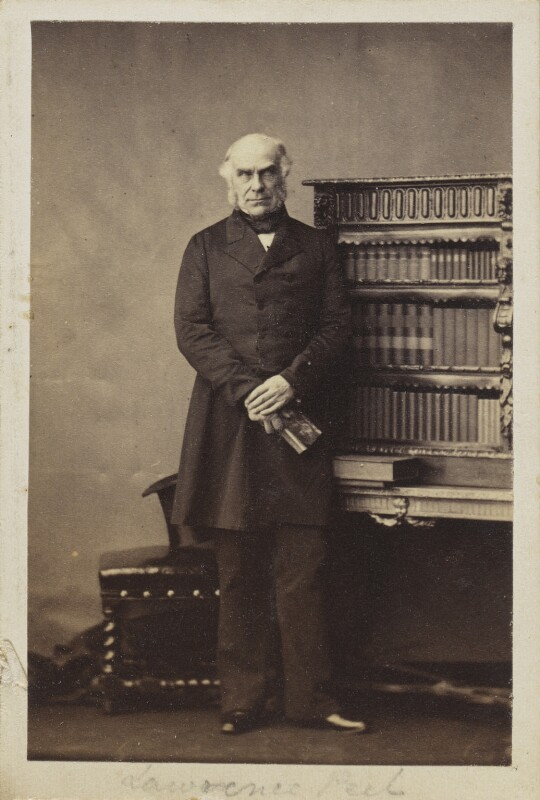
- Peel in 1861

Member of Parliament for Cockermouth
- In office 1827–1830 Serving with Viscount Garlies
- Preceded by: William Wilson; Viscount Garlies
- Succeeded by: Philip Pleydell-Bouverie; Viscount Garlies

Personal details
- Born: Laurence Peel; 28 June 1801 Bury, Greater Manchester
- Died: 12 December 1888 (aged 87) Sussex Square, Brighton
- Party: Tory
- Spouse: Lady Jane Lennox (m. 1822; died 1861)
- Relations: Sir Robert Peel (brother); William Yates Peel (brother); Edmund Peel (brother); Jonathan Peel (brother)
- Children: 6, including Sir Charles
- Parent(s): Sir Robert Peel, 1st Baronet; Ellen Yates
- Education: Rugby School
- Alma mater: Christ Church, Oxford

Laurence Peel (28 June 1801 – 10 December 1888) was a British Tory politician and the younger brother of Sir Robert Peel, 2nd Baronet, the prime minister of the United Kingdom. Laurence was described by one historian as "the youngest and least talented, but perhaps the most personally attractive of the Peel brothers".

== Early life ==
Peel was the sixth son of Sir Robert Peel, 1st Baronet and Ellen Yates. Among his siblings were older brothers, Sir Robert Peel, 2nd Baronet, William Yates Peel (an MP who married Lady Jane Elizabeth Moore, daughter of Stephen Moore, 2nd Earl Mount Cashell), Edmund Peel (also an MP), and Jonathan Peel (a soldier, politician and owner of racehorses). Among his sisters was Harriet Peel (who married Robert Henley, 2nd Baron Henley) and Mary Peel (who married politician George Robert Dawson). His father was a wealthy industrialist and one of early textile manufacturers who sat in the House of Commons representing Tamworth as a 'Church and King' Tory and a staunch supporter of William Pitt the Younger. His grandfather, Robert Peel, and great-grandfather, William Peel, were both yeomen.

Peel was educated at Rugby School and Christ Church, Oxford where he became close friends with the Lord Holland's son, Henry Edward Fox.

== Career ==
When he left Oxford in March 1822, his elder brother Robert, who had recently appointed Home Secretary in Lord Liverpool's ministry, took Laurence into the office as his unpaid private secretary. In 1827, he was elected to the House of Commons as the Member of Parliament for Cockermouth. Peel was an undistinguished Member who is not known to have spoken in debate. He voted against Catholic relief and for the spring guns bill on 23 March 1827. He held the seat until 1830.

After leaving Parliament in 1830, Peel and his wife devoted themselves to the promotion of charitable and religious causes. His eldest brother, Robert, became Prime Minister in 1841.

== Personal life ==
Reportedly, Peel seems to have "flirted with homosexuality" at Oxford, but on 20 July 1822, just after coming of age, he married Lady Jane Lennox (c. 1800-1861), the daughter of the late Duke of Richmond, his elder brother Robert's former chief in Ireland. Lady Jane's mother was the former Lady Charlotte Gordon (sister and heiress of line of George Gordon, 5th Duke of Gordon). Together, Lady Jane and Laurence were the parents of four sons and two daughters:

- Lawrence Charles Lennox Peel (1823–1899), the Clerk of the Privy Council from 1875 to 1898, who married Hon. Caroline Chichester, daughter of Arthur Chichester, 1st Baron Templemore and Lady Augusta Paget (daughter of Henry Paget, 1st Marquess of Anglesey), in 1848.
- Arthur Lennox Peel (1825–1875), a Lt.-Col. in the 52nd Regiment who died unmarried.
- Alfred Lennox Peel (1827–1863), the Rector at St. James Church, Dunbrody and Killesk who died unmarried.
- Cecil Lennox Peel (1830–1910), who married Hon. Susan Caroline Mary Stapleton-Cotton (d. 1916), eldest daughter of Wellington Stapleton-Cotton, 2nd Viscount Combermere and Susan Alice Sitwell (daughter of Sir George Sitwell, 2nd Baronet of Renishaw Hall).
- Olivia Jane Lennox Peel (1832–1848), who died unmarried.
- Constance Augusta Lennox Gordon (1832–1921), who married George Grant Gordon, the son of Lord Francis Arthur Gordon and grandson of George Gordon, 9th Marquess of Huntly. Gordon was Equerry and Controller of the Household to Prince Christian of Schleswig-Holstein and Princess Helena (third daughter of Queen Victoria).

Lady Jane died on 27 March 1861. Peel died at his house at 32 Sussex Square, Brighton, on 10 December 1888, "having provided handsomely for his surviving children."

=== Inheritance ===
On his marriage his father settled on him an annual income of £2,000, with £800 a year to go to Lady Jane in the event of his death. In 1826, however, on attaining the age of 25, he became entitled to £60,000 of the £106,000 which his father had allotted him. Peel, who had been ill and was recovering at Tunbridge Wells, had exceeded his allowance for a London house by taking on the unnecessarily large 11 Connaught Place. His brother Robert had to loan him cash to tide him over avoiding Laurence having a falling out with their father. His marriage settlement was annulled with approximately £47,000 of Laurence's portion being invested to provide £2,000 a year, and giving him control of the remaining £13,000. He got rid of the Connaught Place house and moved to a smaller home off Grosvenor Square. On his father's death in 1830, Laurence received the rest of his inheritance, a total of £135,000 like his four older brothers. His eldest brother Robert inherited the vast majority of their father's estate.

Parliament of the United Kingdom
| Preceded by William Wilson; Viscount Garlies | Member of Parliament for Cockermouth; 1827–1830; With: Viscount Garlies | Succeeded by Philip Pleydell-Bouverie; Viscount Garlies |
