= Norman Gash =

British historian

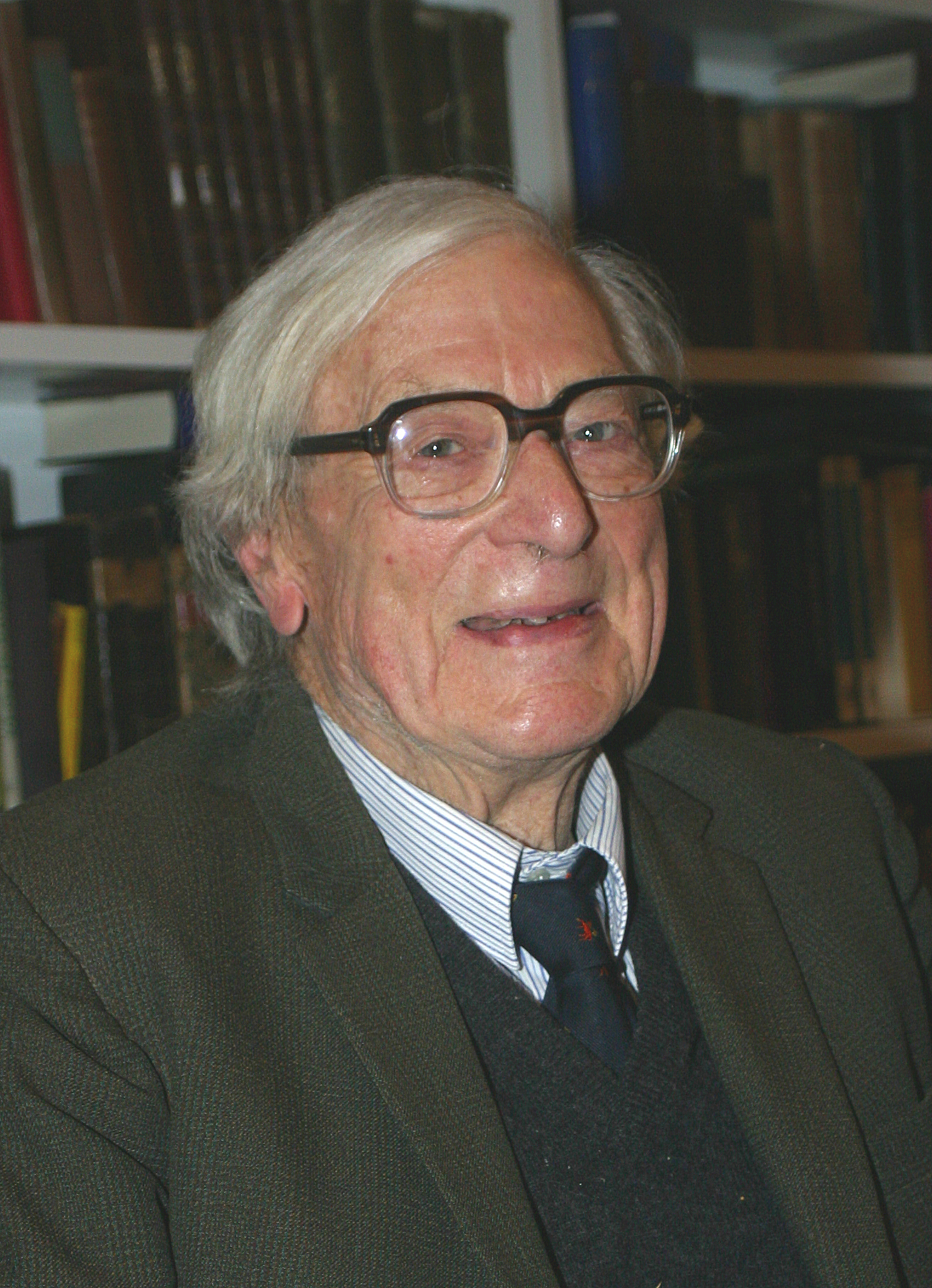
Norman Gash

Norman Gash CBE FBA FRSE FRHistS FRSL (16 January 1912 in Meerut, British Raj – 1 May 2009 in Somerset) was a British historian, best remembered for a two-volume biography of British prime minister Sir Robert Peel. He was professor of modern history at the University of St Andrews from 1955 to 1980 and specialised in the 19th century.

== Early life ==
Gash was born in Meerut, United Provinces (now Uttar Pradesh) in 1912, the son of Frederick Gash, a soldier in the Royal Berkshire Regiment, and of Kate Gash, née Hunt. He attended Wilson Road School and Palmer School in Reading, before gaining a scholarship to Reading School.

He then attended St John's College, Oxford as a scholar, where he took a First in History in 1933. He subsequently completed a B.Litt. thesis on "The rural unrest in England in 1830 with special reference to Berkshire".

== Biography of Sir Robert Peel ==
The first volume of Gash's biography of Sir Robert Peel Mr Secretary Peel (1961) followed his life up until 1830, including his successful period at the Home Office in the 1820s and as far as Catholic Emancipation. The second volume Sir Robert Peel (1972) covered his opposition to the Great Reform Act and his tenures as Prime Minister from 1834 to 1835 and 1841 to 1846. Gash argued that Peel's reforms were paramount in ending the "hungry forties" and bringing about Victorian prosperity. Though Gash's interpretations of Peel have been challenged in recent decades, by historians including Boyd Hilton, this work remains the definitive Peel biography.

== Works ==
- Politics in the Age of Peel: A Study in the Technique of Parliamentary Representation 1830-1850 (1953; rep. 1971)
- Mr Secretary Peel: The Life of Sir Robert Peel to 1830 (1961) vol. 1
- Reaction and Reconstruction in English Politics 1832-1852 (1965)
- The Age of Peel (1968) "Documents of Modern History" series
- Sir Robert Peel: The Life of Sir Robert Peel after 1830 (1972) vol. 2
- Peel (1976) abridged single-volume edition
- Aristocracy and People: Britain 1815-1865 (1979) "The New History of England" series
- Lord Liverpool: The Life and Political Career of Robert Banks Jenkinson, Second Earl of Liverpool, 1770-1828 (1984)
- Pillars of Government and Other Essays on State and Society, c.1770-c.1880 (1986)
- Wellington: Studies in the Political and Military Career of the First Duke of Wellington (1990)
- Wellington Anecdotes: A Critical Survey (1992) Issue 4 of "Wellington Lecture"
- Robert Surtees and Early Victorian Society (1993)
