= Charles Lennox Peel =

British civil servant

Sir Charles Lennox Peel GCB (19 January 1823 – 19 August 1899) was a British civil servant.

== Biography ==
Peel was the son of Laurence Peel, son of Sir Robert Peel, 1st Baronet, and Lady Jane Lennox, daughter of Charles Lennox, 4th Duke of Richmond. He bought a commission in the British Army and served with the 7th Queen's Own Hussars and the Edmonton Royal Rifle Regiment of Middlesex Militia. He relinquished his commission on 8 October 1860.

He subsequently became a civil servant and was Clerk of the Privy Council between 17 March 1875 and 9 August 1898. He was made Knight Commander of the Order of the Bath in the 1890 New Year Honours. and upgraded to Knight Grand Cross of the Order of the Bath in the 1899 New Year Honours.

Peel married Hon. Caroline Chichester, daughter of Arthur Chichester, 1st Baron Templemore, on 27 April 1848.

Government offices
Preceded by Sir Arthur Helps	Clerk of the Privy Council; 1875–1898	Succeeded by Sir Almeric FitzRoy
