= George Grant Gordon =

British Army officer and courtier

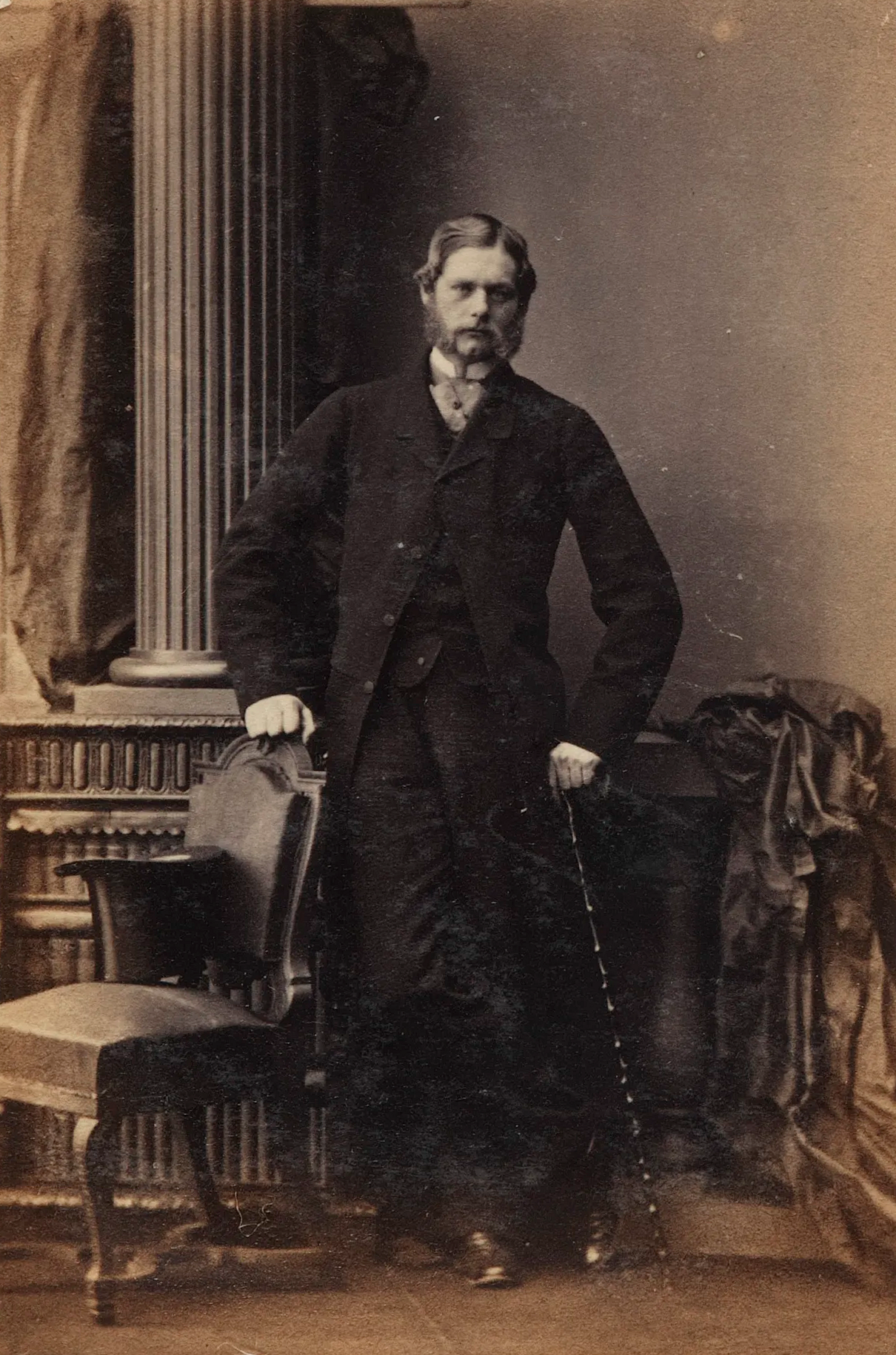
Portrait by Camille Silvy, 1861

Colonel George Grant Gordon, CB, CVO, JP (29 January 1836 – 24 January 1912) was a British Army officer and courtier.

== Career ==
Gordon was born in 1836, the son of Lieut.-Col. Lord Francis Arthur Gordon (1808–1857), youngest son of the 9th Marquess of Huntly, by his wife Isabel Grant (d. 1892), daughter of General Sir William Keir Grant.

He joined the British Army, where he was commissioned an officer in the Scots Guards. He served in the Crimean War 1854–55, and took part in the Siege of Sebastopol (September 1854 to September 1855), including the battles of Alma (September 1854), Balaclava (October 1854), Inkerman (November 1854) and the fall of Sebastopol (September 1855). From 22 August 1855 until 12 November 1855, he was Aide-de-camp to General James Simpson, commander of British troops in the Crimea. For his service he received the Crimea Medal with four clasps, the Turkish Crimea Medal, and was appointed to the 5th class of the Order of the Medjidie. Following his retirement from active service in February 1863, he was appointed a lieutenant-colonel of the 2nd Battalion of the Royal Scottish Reserve Regiment. He was later appointed lieutenant-colonel in command of the 3rd (Edinburgh Light Infantry Militia) Battalion, Royal Scots, based at Glencorse Barracks, Midlothian, and on 7 March 1900 was appointed to the honorary colonelcy of the battalion.

He served as Justice of the peace (JP) for the County of London and for Berkshire.

Gordon was Equerry and Controller of the Household to the Prince and Princess Christian of Schleswig-Holstein. He was appointed a Companion of the Order of the Bath (CB), civil division, in 1891, and a Commander of the Royal Victorian Order (CVO) in 1897.

== Family ==
Gordon married, in 1863, Constance Augusta Lennox Peel, daughter of Tory Member of Parliament Laurence Peel (son of Sir Robert Peel, 1st Baronet), by his wife Lady Jane Lennox, daughter of the 4th Duke of Richmond. She died in 1921. They had three children:

- Brigadier-General Laurence George Frank Gordon, CB, DSO (1864–1943), of the Royal Artillery
- Christian Frederick Gordon (1866–1934)
- Helena Jane Gordon (1870–1932), who married Rev. William Henry Stone (d.1920)
