= Henry James Pidding =

English painter

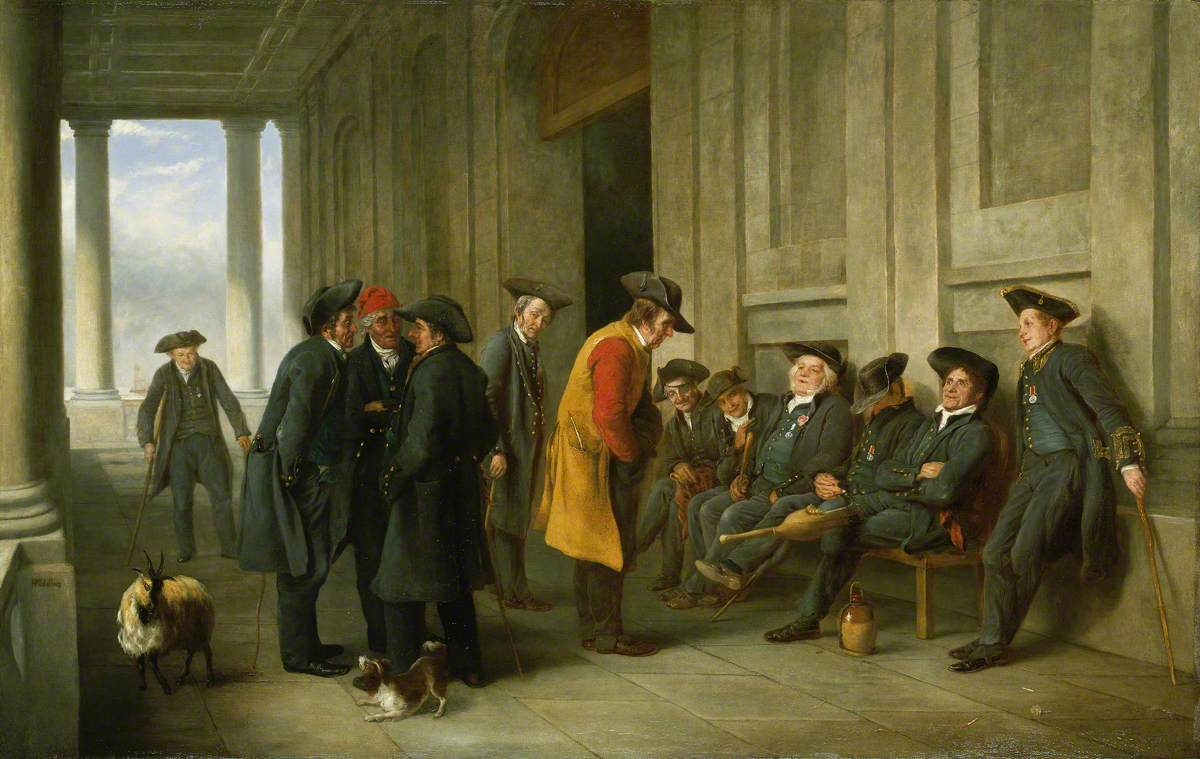
Pensioners outside the chapel at Greenwich (1844)

Henry James Pidding, RBA (1797 – 1864) was an English humorous artist. Henry James Pidding, born in London in 1797, was son of a stationer and lottery-office keeper at No. 1 Cornhill. He is said to have been a pupil of Azilo, a painter of domestic scenes.

Pidding attained some note by his paintings of humorous subjects from domestic life, and was a very prolific exhibitor at the Society of British Artists in Suffolk Street, of which society he was elected a member in 1843.

He also exhibited pictures at the Royal Academy, the British Institution, and various local exhibitions. About 1860 he attempted to make a sensation with a larger painting of The Gaming Rooms at Homburg. Several of his pictures were engraved, some by his own hand in mezzotint, such as The Greenwich Pensioners (now at Woburn Abbey), Massa Out. "Sambo Werry Dry" (formerly in the collection of Lord Charles Townshend), A Negro in the Stocks, A Fair Penitent, and many others. In 1836 Pidding etched a series of six humorous illustrations to The Rival Demons, an anonymous poem. Pidding resided at Greenwich, where he died on 13 June 1864, aged 67.

== Bibliography ==
- Cust, Lionel Henry (1896). "Pidding, Henry James" . In Lee, Sidney (ed.). Dictionary of National Biography. Vol. 45. London: Smith, Elder & Co. p. 256.
- Cust, L. H. and Newton, Jane (2004). "Pidding, Henry James (1797–1864), painter". In Oxford Dictionary of National Biography. Oxford University Press.
- Oliver, Valerie Cassel, ed. (2011). "Pidding, Henry James". In Benezit Dictionary of Artists. Oxford University Press.
