= Robert Peel =

Prime Minister of the United Kingdom (1834–1835; 1841–1846)

The Right Honourable Sir Robert Peel Bt FRS
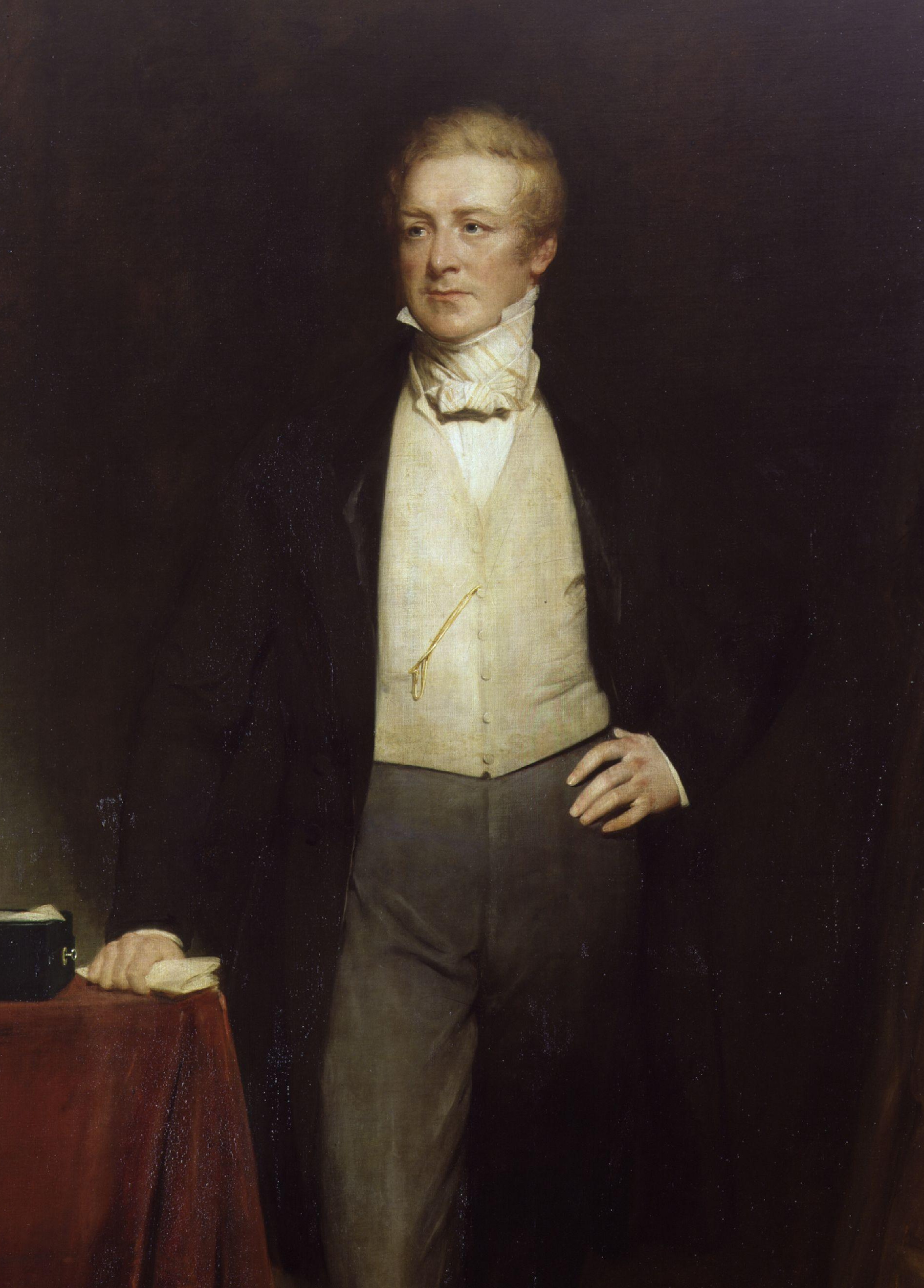
- Portrait by Henry William Pickersgill

Prime Minister of the United Kingdom
- In office 30 August 1841 – 29 June 1846
- Monarch: Victoria
- Preceded by: The Viscount Melbourne
- Succeeded by: Lord John Russell
- In office 10 December 1834 – 8 April 1835
- Monarch: William IV
- Preceded by: The Duke of Wellington
- Succeeded by: The Viscount Melbourne

Leader of the Opposition
- In office 18 April 1835 – 30 August 1841
- Prime Minister: The Viscount Melbourne
- Preceded by: The Viscount Melbourne
- Succeeded by: The Viscount Melbourne

Chancellor of the Exchequer
- In office 15 December 1834 – 8 April 1835
- Prime Minister: Himself
- Preceded by: The Lord Denman
- Succeeded by: Thomas Spring Rice

Home Secretary
- In office 26 January 1828 – 22 November 1830
- Prime Minister: The Duke of Wellington
- Preceded by: The Marquess of Lansdowne
- Succeeded by: The Viscount Melbourne
- In office 17 January 1822 – 10 April 1827
- Prime Minister: The Earl of Liverpool
- Preceded by: The Viscount Sidmouth
- Succeeded by: William Sturges Bourne

Chief Secretary for Ireland
- In office August 1812 – August 1818
- Prime Minister: The Earl of Liverpool
- Preceded by: The Earl of Mornington
- Succeeded by: Charles Grant

Personal details
- Born: 5 February 1788 Bury, Lancashire, England
- Died: 2 July 1850 (aged 62) Westminster, Middlesex, England
- Resting place: St Peter Churchyard, Drayton Bassett
- Party: Tory (1809–1834); Conservative (1834–1846); Peelite (from 1846)
- Spouse: Julia Floyd (m. 1820)
- Relations: Edmund Peel (brother)
- Children: 7, including Robert, Frederick, William and Arthur
- Parents: Sir Robert Peel, 1st Baronet (father); Ellen Yates (mother)
- Education: Harrow School; Christ Church, Oxford (BA); Lincoln's Inn

Military service
- Years of service: 1820
- Rank: Lieutenant
- Unit: Staffordshire Yeomanry

Sir Robert Peel, 2nd Baronet (5 February 1788 – 2 July 1850), was a British Conservative statesman who served as Prime Minister of the United Kingdom (1834–1835, 1841–1846), Chancellor of the Exchequer (1834–1835), and Home Secretary (1822–1827, 1828–1830). He is regarded as the father of modern British policing, owing to his founding of the Metropolitan Police while he was Home Secretary. Peel was one of the founders of the modern Conservative Party.

The son of a wealthy textile manufacturer and politician, Peel was the first prime minister from an industrial business background. He earned a double first in classics and mathematics from Christ Church, Oxford. He entered the House of Commons in 1809 and became a rising star in the Tory Party. Peel entered the Cabinet as Home Secretary (1822–1827), in which post he reformed and liberalised the criminal law and created the modern police force, leading to a new type of officer known in tribute to him as "bobbies" and "peelers"(most often peelers). After a brief period out of office he returned as Home Secretary under his political mentor the Duke of Wellington (1828–1830), also serving as Leader of the House of Commons. Initially a supporter of continued legal discrimination against Catholics, Peel reversed his stance and supported the Roman Catholic Relief Act 1829 and the 1828 repeal of the Test Act, writing, "though emancipation was a great danger, civil strife was a greater danger".

After being in opposition from 1830 to 1834, he became prime minister in November 1834. Peel issued the Tamworth Manifesto in December 1834, laying down the principles upon which the modern Conservative Party is based. His first ministry was a minority government, dependent on Whig support and with Peel serving as his own Chancellor of the Exchequer. After only four months, his government collapsed and he was Leader of the Opposition during the second Melbourne ministry (1835–1841). Peel became prime minister again after the 1841 general election. His second ministry lasted five years. He cut tariffs to stimulate trade, replacing the lost revenue with a 3 per cent income tax. He played a central role in making free trade a reality and set up a modern banking system. His government's major legislation included the Mines and Collieries Act 1842, the Income Tax Act 1842, the Factories Act 1844 and the Railway Regulation Act 1844. Peel's government was weakened by anti-Catholic sentiment following the controversial increase in the Maynooth Grant of 1845. After the outbreak of the Great Irish Famine, his decision to join with Whigs and Radicals to repeal the Corn Laws led to his resignation as prime minister in 1846. Peel remained an influential MP and leader of the Peelite faction until his death in 1850.

Peel often started from a traditional Tory position in opposition to a measure, then reversed his stance and became the leader in supporting liberal legislation. This happened with the Test Act, Catholic emancipation, the Reform Act, income tax, and most notably the repeal of the Corn Laws. The historian A. J. P. Taylor wrote: "Peel was in the first rank of 19th-century statesmen. He carried Catholic Emancipation; he repealed the Corn Laws; he created the modern Conservative Party on the ruins of the old Toryism."

== Early life ==
Robert Peel was born on 5 February 1788 at Chamber Hall in Bury, Lancashire, to the industrialist and parliamentarian Sir Robert Peel, 1st Baronet, and his wife, Ellen Yates. The elder Robert was one of the richest textile manufacturers of the early Industrial Revolution and had a distinguished career as a member of parliament, even being consulted on financial matters by Prime Minister William Pitt the Younger.

The family's history dates back to the 17th century, where it descends from yeomen in Lancashire. In 1731, a certain William Peele bought a little estate called Peelfold which later was inherited by Robert Peel senior. It was the elder Robert who changed the family name from "Peele" to "Peel", remarking that "it was of no use as it did not add to the sound." The family moved from Lancashire to Drayton Manor near Tamworth, Staffordshire; the manor house has since been demolished, and the site occupied by Drayton Manor Theme Park.

Before the end of the year, Peel was motherless and—according to historian Norman Gash—left without "the warmth and care that a mother, or even in happier circumstances a stepmother, might have given them." Peel's father placed high standards for his children and raised the Peel boys on a discipline of hard work and proper duty. It was said that during the younger Peel's baptism, his father got down on his knees and dedicated his son's life to the country's service.

From an early age, it was apparent that Robert was "the ablest of the family". His father once asked a tutor if his son would become a "William Pitt", to which the tutor replied, "I hope so… but Robert Peel will be Robert Peel." He would later recall his father saying, "Bob, you dog, if you are not prime minister some day, I'll disinherit you."

Peel received his early education from a clergyman tutor in Bury and at a clergyman's local school in Tamworth. There he was schooled in classical studies and emerged as a brilliant student among his peers. The broad park and surrounding countryside of Drayton instilled in Peel a love for the outdoors and led Peel to take up shooting. He may also have attended Bury Grammar School or Hipperholme Grammar School, though evidence for either is anecdotal rather than textual.

In Bury, Peel was exposed to "ridicule and jealousy" due to the family's standing; according to his brother, Lawrence, Robert "would walk a mile around rather than encounter the rude jests of the Bury lads". Peel senior knew the value of elite education and social networks and was "too shrewd not to see the advantages of coming into contact at an impressionable age and on equal terms with the future governing class of England." Accordingly, Robert was sent to Harrow in 1800 at the age of twelve, making him the first of his siblings to leave home. He started at Harrow School in February 1800.

At Harrow he was a contemporary of Lord Byron, who recalled of Peel that "we were on good terms" and that "I was always in scrapes, and he never". On Harrow's Speech Day in 1804, Peel and Byron acted part of Virgil's Aeneid, Peel playing Turnus and Byron playing Latinus.

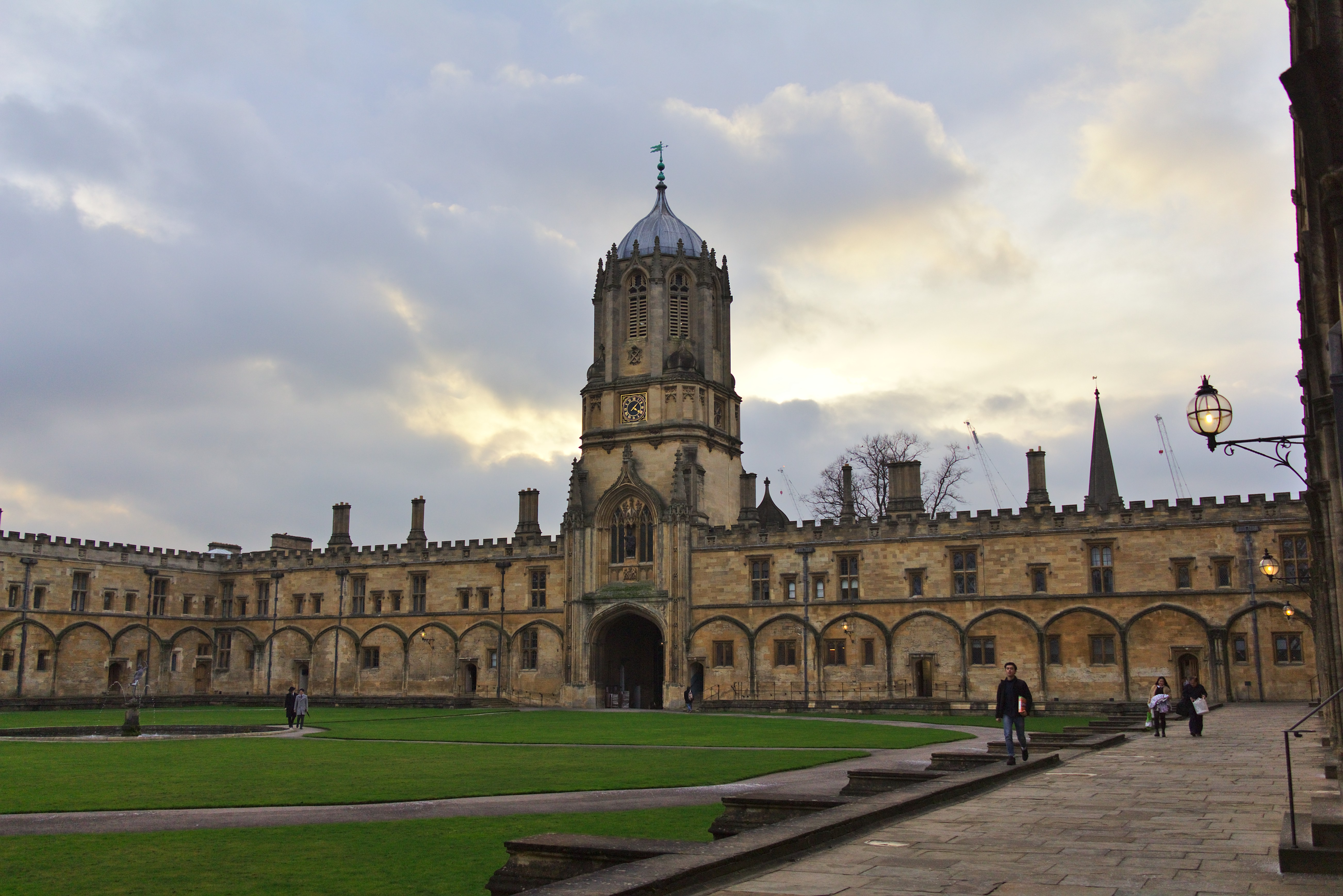
Christ Church, Oxford, which Peel attended 1805–1808, graduating with a double first. He was later MP for the university, 1817–1829.

In 1805 Peel matriculated at Christ Church, Oxford. His tutor was Charles Lloyd, later Regius Professor of Divinity, on Peel's recommendation appointed Bishop of Oxford. In 1808 Peel became the first Oxford student to take a double first in classics and mathematics.

Peel was a law student at Lincoln's Inn in 1809. He also held military commissions as a captain in the Manchester Regiment of Militia in 1808, and later as lieutenant in the Staffordshire Yeomanry Cavalry in 1820.

== Early political career: 1809–1822 ==
=== Member of Parliament ===
Peel entered politics in 1809 at the age of 21, as the member of Parliament (MP) for the Irish rotten borough of Cashel in County Tipperary. With a scant 24 electors on the rolls, he was elected unopposed. His sponsor for the election (besides his father) was the Chief Secretary for Ireland, Sir Arthur Wellesley, the future Duke of Wellington, with whom Peel's political career would be entwined for the next 25 years. Peel made his maiden speech at the start of the 1810 session, when he was chosen by the Prime Minister, Spencer Perceval, to second the reply to the King's speech. Peel's speech was a sensation, famously described by the Speaker, Charles Abbot, as "the best first speech since that of William Pitt [the Younger]."

Peel changed constituency twice, becoming one of the two members for Chippenham in 1812, and then one of those for Oxford University in 1817.

=== Junior minister ===
In 1810 Peel was appointed an Under-Secretary of State for War and the Colonies; the senior minister in the portfolio, the secretary of state, was Lord Liverpool. When Liverpool, as Prime Minister, formed a government in 1812, Peel was appointed Chief Secretary for Ireland. The Peace Preservation Act 1814, proposed by Peel as responsible minister, authorised the Lord Lieutenant of Ireland to appoint additional magistrates in a county in a state of disturbance, who were authorised to appoint paid special constables (later called "peelers"). Peel thus laid the basis for the Royal Irish Constabulary.

Peel firmly opposed Catholic emancipation, believing that Catholics could not be admitted to Parliament as they refused to swear the Oath of Allegiance to the Crown. In May 1817, Peel delivered the closing speech in opposition to Henry Grattan's Catholic emancipation bill; the bill was defeated by 245 votes to 221. Peel resigned as Chief Secretary and left Ireland in August 1818.

In 1819 the House of Commons appointed a select committee, the Bullion Committee, charged with stabilising British finances after the end of the Napoleonic Wars, and Peel was chosen as its chairman. Peel's Bill was a set of legislative measures designed to return the British currency to the gold standard, reversing the Bank Restriction Act 1797, within four years — this was actually accomplished very much more quickly, by 1821.

== Home Secretary: 1822–1830 ==
=== Senior minister ===
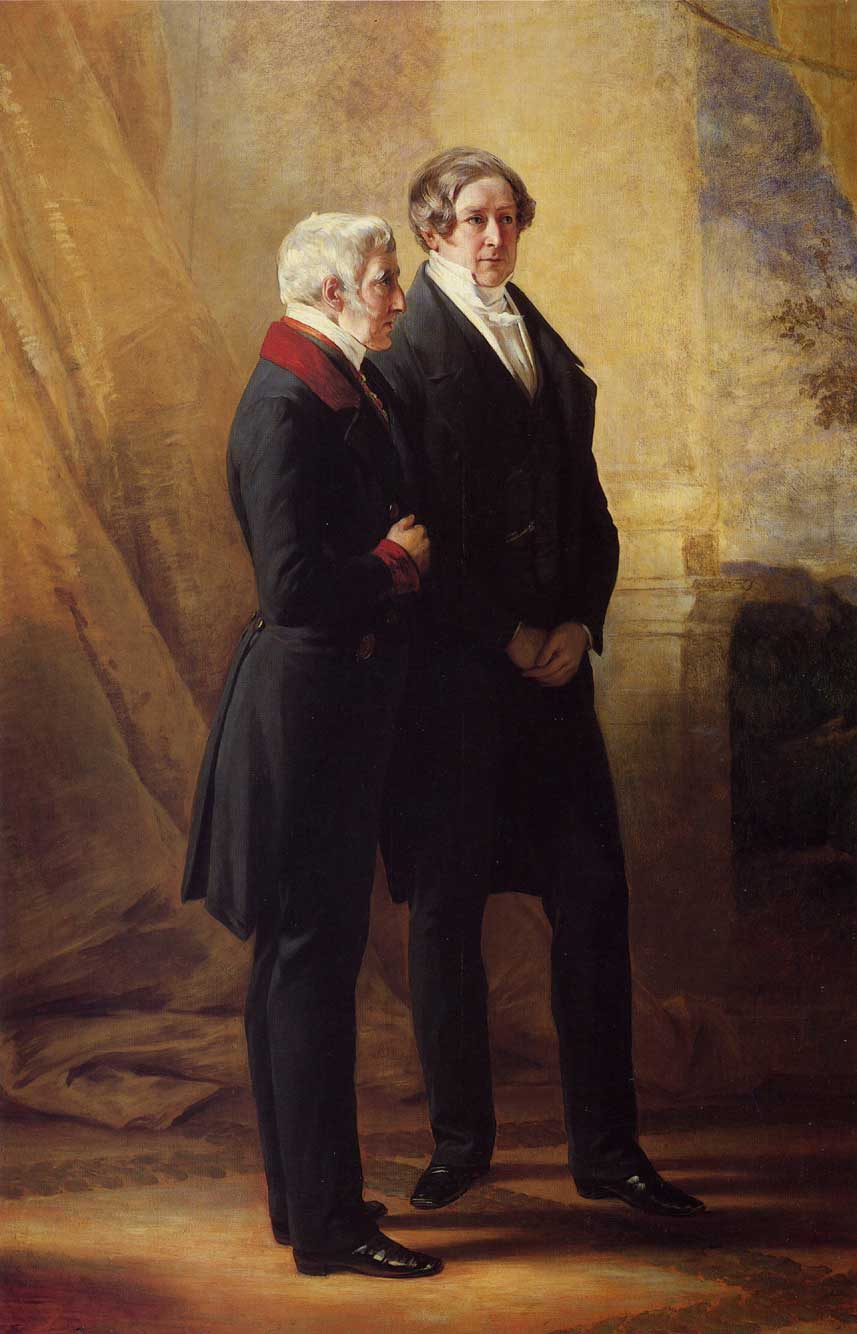
The Duke of Wellington and Sir Robert Peel, 1844, by Franz Xaver Winterhalter

Peel was considered one of the rising stars of the Tory party, first entering the cabinet in 1822 as home secretary. As home secretary, he introduced a large number of important reforms to British criminal law.

=== Reforms and policies ===
In one of his policies, he reduced the number of crimes punishable by death, and simplified the law by repealing a large number of criminal statutes and consolidating their provisions into what are known as Peel's Acts. He reformed the gaol system, introducing payment for gaolers and education for the inmates in the Gaols Act 1823 (4 Geo. 4. c. 64).

In 1827 the Prime Minister, Lord Liverpool, became incapacitated and was replaced by George Canning. Peel resigned as Home Secretary. Canning favoured Catholic emancipation, while Peel had been one of its most outspoken opponents (earning the nickname "Orange Peel", with Orange the colour of the Protestant Orange Order). George Canning himself died less than four months later and, after the brief premiership of Lord Goderich, Peel returned to the post of Home Secretary under the premiership of his long-time ally the Duke of Wellington. During this time he was widely perceived as the number-two in the Tory Party, after Wellington himself.

The Test and Corporation Acts required many officials to be communicants in the Anglican Church and penalised both nonconformists and Catholics. They were no longer enforced but were a matter of humiliation. Peel at first opposed the repeal, but reversed himself and led the repeal on behalf of the government, after consultation with Anglican Church leaders. The Sacramental Test Act 1828 passed into law in May 1828. In future religious issues he made it a point to consult church leaders from the major denominations.

The 1828 County Clare by-election returned the Catholic Irish nationalist leader Daniel O'Connell. By autumn 1828 the Chief Secretary for Ireland was alarmed by the extent of civil disorder and the prospect of a rebellion if O'Connell were barred from Parliament. Wellington and Peel now conceded the necessity of Catholic emancipation, Peel writing to Wellington that "though emancipation was a great danger, civil strife was a greater danger".

Peel drew up the Catholic Relief bill. He felt compelled to stand for re-election to his seat in Oxford, as he was representing the graduates of Oxford University (many of whom were Anglican clergymen), and had previously stood on a platform of opposition to Catholic Emancipation. Peel lost his seat in a by-election in February 1829 to Ultra-Tory Robert Inglis, but soon found another by moving to a rotten borough, Westbury, retaining his Cabinet position. He stood for Tamworth in the general election of 1830, representing Tamworth until his death.

Peel guided the Catholic Relief (Emancipation) bill through the House of Commons, Wellington through the House of Lords. With many Ultra-Tories vehemently opposed to emancipation, the bill could pass only with Whig support.

Wellington threatened to resign if King George IV did not give royal assent; the King finally relented, and the Roman Catholic Relief Act 1829 became law in April. Peel's U-turn cost him the trust of many Tories: according to the historian Norman Gash, Peel had been "the idolised champion of the Protestant party; that party now regarded him as an outcast".

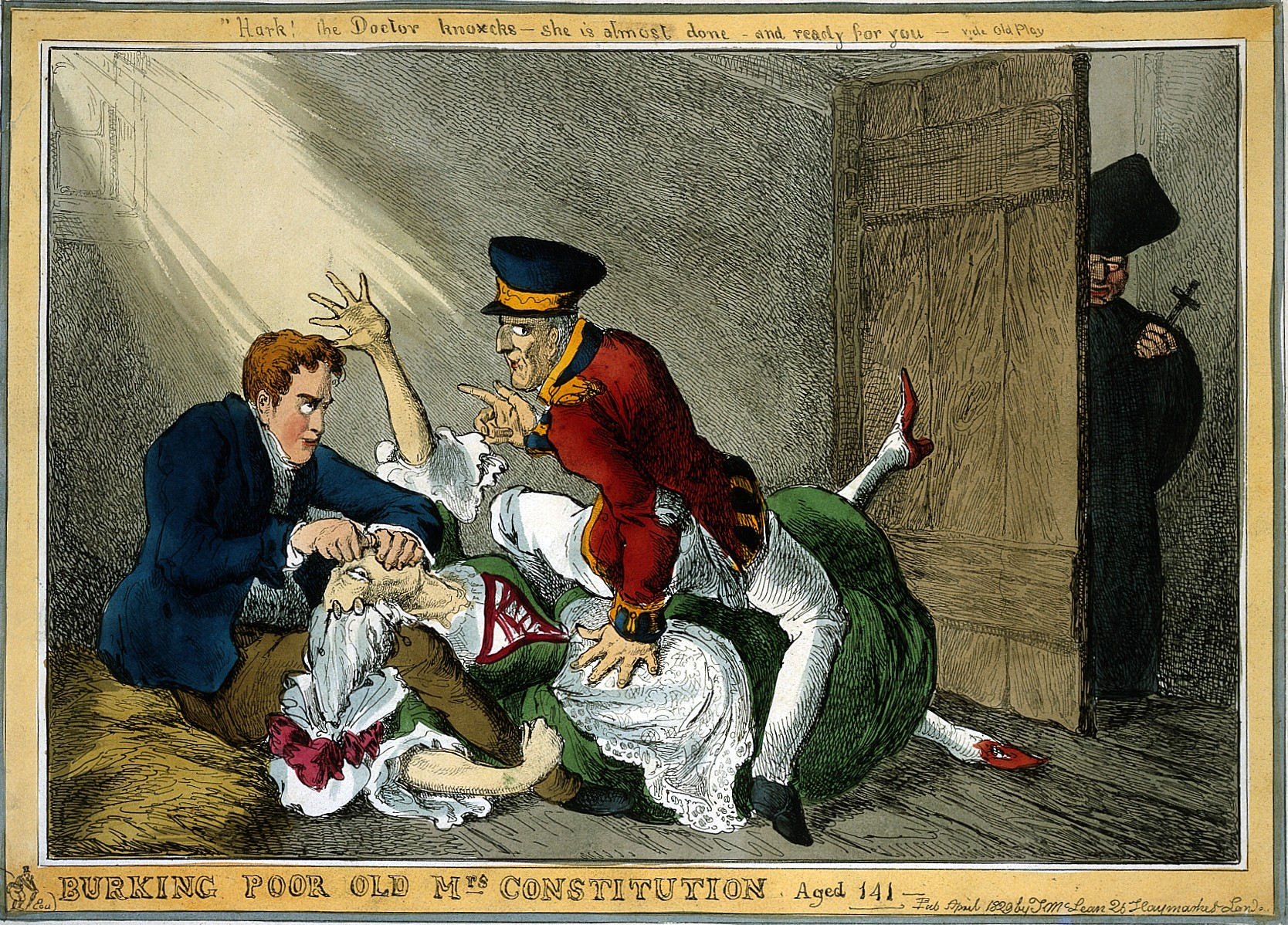
Burking Poor Old Mrs Constitution. This satirical 1829 cartoon by William Heath depicted the Duke of Wellington and Peel in the roles of the body-snatchers Burke and Hare suffocating Mrs Docherty for sale to Dr. Robert Knox; representing the extinguishing by Wellington and Peel of the 141-year-old Constitution of 1688 by Catholic emancipation.

=== Founding the Metropolitan Police ===
It was in 1829 that Peel established the Metropolitan Police Force for London based at Scotland Yard. The 1,000 constables employed were affectionately nicknamed 'bobbies' or, somewhat less affectionately, 'peelers'. Although unpopular at first, they proved very successful in cutting crime in London, and, by 1857 all cities in Britain were obliged to form their own police forces. Known as the father of modern policing, Peel is thought to have contributed to the Metropolitan Police's first set of "Instructions to Police Officers", emphasising the importance of its civilian nature and policing by consent. However, what are now commonly known as the Peelian Principles were not written by him but were instead produced by Charles Reith in his 1948 book, A Short History of the British Police, as a nine-point summary of the 1829 "Instructions".

== Opposition: 1830–1834 ==
The middle and working classes in England at that time, however, were clamouring for reform, and Catholic emancipation was only one of the ideas in the air. The Tory ministry refused to bend on other issues and were swept out of office in 1830 in favour of the Whigs. The following few years were extremely turbulent, but eventually enough reforms were passed that King William IV felt confident enough to invite the Tories to form a ministry again in succession to those of Lord Grey and Lord Melbourne in December 1834. Peel was selected as prime minister but was in Italy at the time, so Wellington acted as a caretaker for three weeks until Peel's return.

== First premiership: 1834–1835 ==
=== Appointment ===
Following the resignation of the former prime minister Charles Grey, because of an issue regarding Ireland's conciliatory reform and at the invitation of William IV, Peel became prime minister in early December 1834. Peel formed his own government, though it was a Tory government that was a minority government and depended on Whig goodwill for its continued existence. Parliament was dissolved in late December 1834 and a general election was called. Voting took place in January and February 1835, and Peel's supporters gained around 100 seats, but this was not enough to give them a majority.

=== Tamworth Manifesto ===
As his statement of policy at the general election of January 1835, Peel issued the Tamworth Manifesto. This document was the basis on which the modern Conservative Party was founded. In it Peel pledged that the Conservatives would endorse modest reform such as reforms concerning economic and financial affairs, free trade and factory workers' rights.

The Whigs formed a compact with Daniel O'Connell's Irish Radical members to repeatedly defeat the government on various bills. Eventually, after only about 100 days in government, Peel's ministry resigned out of frustration and the Whigs under Lord Melbourne returned to power. The only real achievement of Peel's first administration was establishing the Ecclesiastical Commission to review the governance of the Church of England. This ecclesiastical commission was the forerunner of the Church Commissioners.

=== Confidence vote and resignation ===
Despite the 1835 general election in January, from which Peel attempted to consolidate his party's majority in Parliament, the Conservatives still remained a minority. This made Peel's position in the Commons precarious from the start.

The immediate cause of Peel's downfall was a debate over the Church of Ireland. On 7 April 1835, the Whig MP Ralph Bernal brought forward a report critical of Peel's administration of the Church of Ireland's revenues and proposed reforms. The report was passed in the Commons by a vote of 285 to 258, signifying a lack of confidence in Peel's government. This defeat underscored the government's inability to secure enough support to govern effectively.

This loss led to Peel's resignation the following day, on 8 April 1835. The passing of the vote of no confidence highlighted the conditions in British politics at the time in a parliamentary system. After Peel's resignation, William IV invited Lord Melbourne to form a new government, allowing the Whigs to return to power.

== Leader of the Opposition: 1835–1841 ==
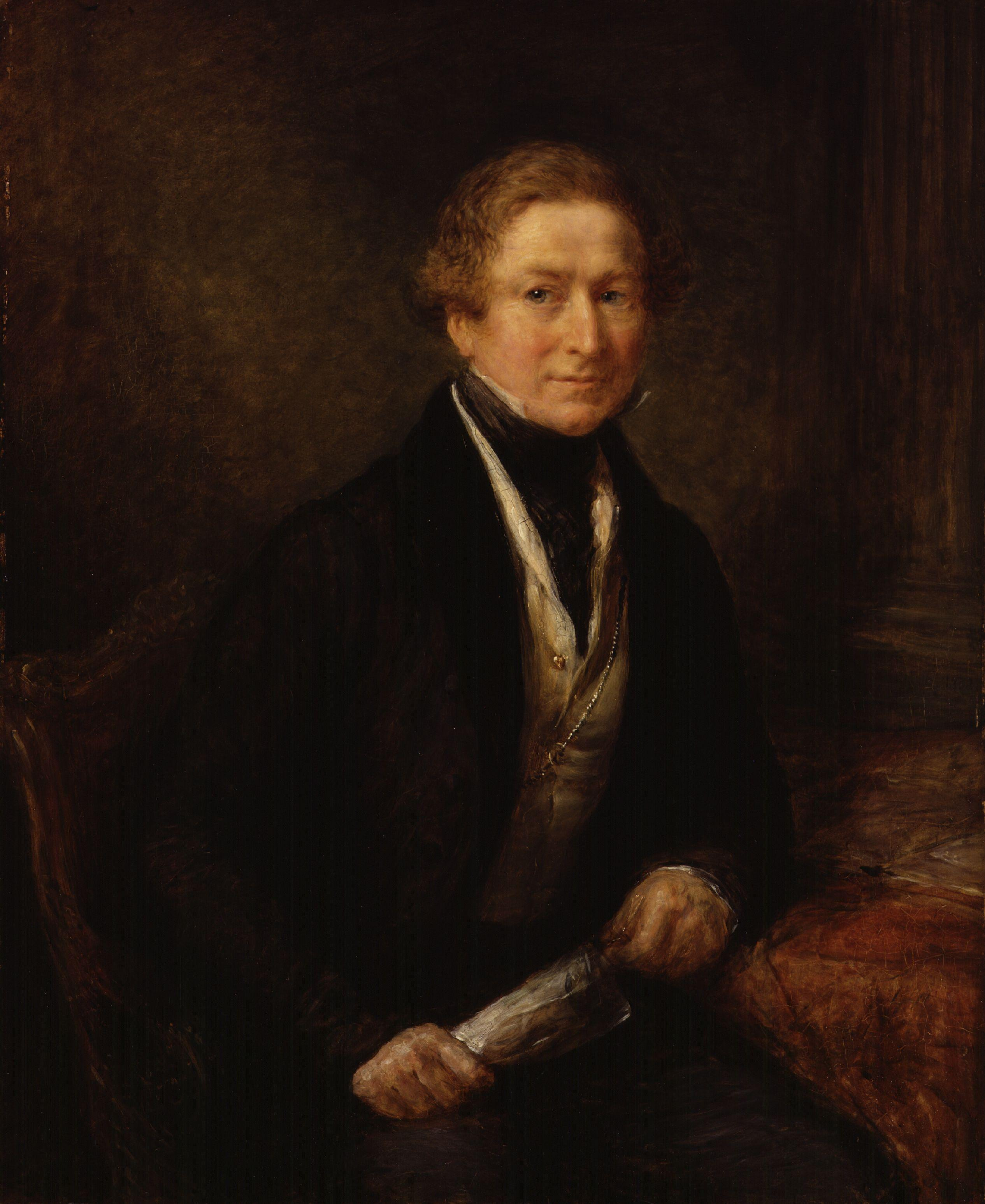
Portrait of Sir Robert Peel by John Linnell, 1838

Peel's party was bolstered by the adherence of a number of dissident Whigs associated with the Derby Dilly. These self-described 'moderate Whigs' were led by former cabinet ministers Edward Smith-Stanley, 14th Earl of Derby, and Sir James Graham, 2nd Baronet.

In May 1839 Peel was offered another chance to form a government, this time by Queen Victoria. However, this too would have been a minority government, and Peel felt he needed a further sign of confidence from the Queen. Lord Melbourne had been Victoria's confidant since her accession in 1837, and many of the higher posts in Victoria's household were held by the wives and female relatives of Whigs; there was some feeling that Victoria had allowed herself to be too closely associated with the Whig party. Peel, therefore, asked for some of this entourage to be dismissed and replaced with their Conservative counterparts, provoking the so-called Bedchamber Crisis. Victoria refused to change her household, and despite pleadings from Wellington, relied on assurances of support from Whig leaders. Peel refused to form a government, and the Whigs returned to power.

== Second premiership: 1841–1846 ==
=== Economic reforms ===
Peel finally had a chance to head a majority government following the election of July 1841. Peel came to office during an economic recession which had seen a slump in world trade and a budget deficit of £7.5 million run up by the Whigs. Confidence in banks and businesses was low, and a trade deficit existed.

To raise revenue Peel's 1842 budget saw the re-introduction of the income tax, removed previously at the end of the Napoleonic Wars. The rate was 7d in the pound, or just under 3 per cent. The money raised was more than expected and allowed for the removal and reduction of over 1,200 tariffs on imports including the controversial sugar duties. It was also in the 1842 budget that the repeal of the corn laws was first proposed. It was defeated in a Commons vote by a margin of 4:1.

The economic historian Charles Read has analysed Peel's economic policies as:

(i) Fixing the value of British currency to a gold standard, with the paper pound currency freely convertible to gold.

(ii) A limited banknote supply based on a fixed relationship to the gold reserve.

(iii) Free movement of bullion flows from 1819 and lower import tariffs on food and raw materials from 1842 (often loosely referred to as free trade).

(iv) Control of interest rates and a balanced budget in order to reduce the national debt.

=== Domestic policy ===
==== Health ====
A Board of Supervision was established, and two measures passed, under which county asylums were erected and prompt medical treatment was ensured. In addition, it was provided "that a certificate of insanity, signed by two disinterested doctors, had to be presented before any person was confined to an asylum." According to one study, "the whole treatment of lunacy was humanised and lifted out of the atmosphere of profits into that of curative effort and civic responsibility."

==== Factory Act ====
Peel's promise of modest reform was held to, and the second most famous bill of this ministry, while "reforming" in 21st-century eyes, was in fact aimed at the reformers themselves, with their constituency among the new industrial rich. The Factory Act 1844 acted more against these industrialists than it did against the traditional stronghold of the Conservatives, the landed gentry, by restricting the number of hours that children and women could work in a factory and setting rudimentary safety standards for machinery. This was a continuation of his own father's work as an MP, as the elder Robert Peel was most noted for the reform of working conditions during the first part of the 19th century. Helping him was Lord Shaftesbury, a British MP who also established the coal mines act.

==== Assassination attempt ====
In 1843 Peel was the target of a failed assassination attempt; a criminally insane Scottish woodturner named Daniel M'Naghten stalked him for several days before, on 20 January, killing Peel's personal secretary Edward Drummond thinking he was Peel, which led to the formation of the controversial criminal defence of insanity.

==== Corn Laws ====
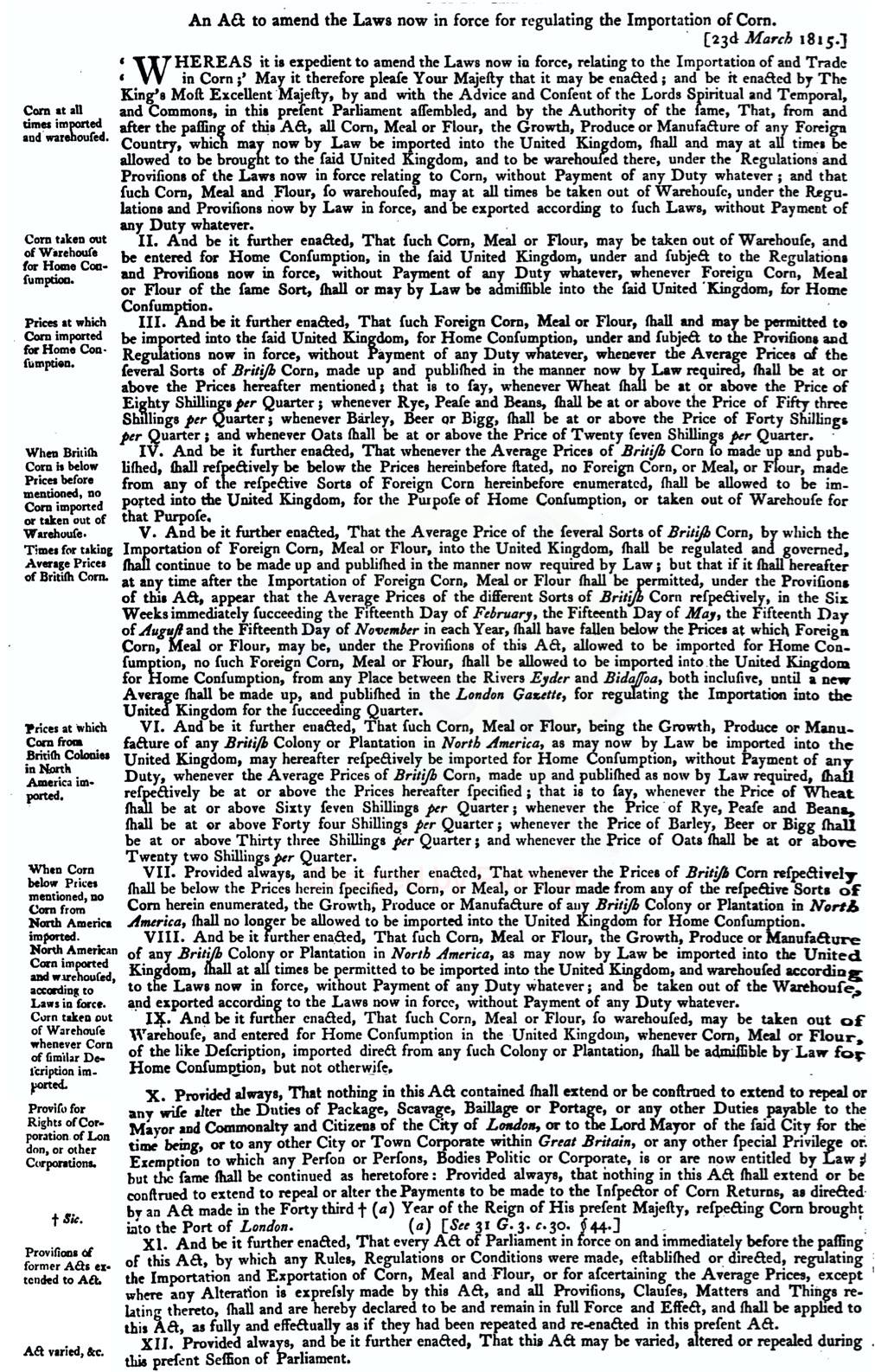
The 1815 Corn Laws, first introduced by the Tory government of prime minister Lord Liverpool. This law was made to amend the laws for regulating the importation of corn. This act was still in effect by the time Peel became prime minister himself in 1841.

The most notable act of Peel's second ministry, however, was the one that would bring it down. Peel moved against the landholders by repealing the Corn Laws, which supported agricultural revenues by restricting grain imports. This radical break with Conservative protectionism was triggered by the Great Irish Famine (1845–1849). Tory agriculturalists were sceptical of the extent of the problem, and Peel reacted slowly to the famine, famously stating in October 1846 (already in opposition): "There is such a tendency to exaggeration and inaccuracy in Irish reports that delay in acting on them is always desirable".

His own party failed to support the bill, but it passed with Whig and Radical support. On the third reading of Peel's Bill of Repeal (Importation Act 1846) on 15 May, MPs voted 327 votes to 229 (a majority of 98) to repeal the Corn Laws. On 25 June Wellington persuaded the Lords to pass it. On that same night Peel's Irish Coercion Bill was defeated in the Commons by 292 to 219 by "a combination of Whigs, Radicals, and Tory protectionists". Following this, on 29 June 1846, Peel resigned as prime minister.

=== Famine in Ireland ===
Though he knew repealing the laws would mean the end of his ministry, Peel decided to do so. It is possible that Peel merely used the Irish Famine as an excuse to repeal the Corn Laws as he had been an intellectual convert to free trade since the 1820s. Blake points out that if Peel had been convinced that total repeal was necessary to stave off the famine, he would have enacted a bill that brought about immediate temporary repeal, not permanent repeal over a three-year period of gradual tapering-off of duties. Peel's support for free trade could already be seen in his 1842 and 1845 budgets; in late 1842 Sir James Graham wrote to Peel that "the next change in the Corn Laws must be to an open trade" while arguing that the government should not tackle the issue. Speaking to the cabinet in 1844, Peel argued that the choice was the maintenance of the 1842 Corn Law or total repeal. The historian Boyd Hilton argued that Peel knew from 1844 he was going to be deposed as the Conservative leader. Many of his MPs had taken to voting against him, and the rupture within the party between liberals and paternalists, which had been so damaging in the 1820s but masked by the issue of parliamentary reform in the 1830s, was brought to the surface over the Corn Laws. Hilton's hypothesis is that Peel wished to be deposed on a liberal issue so that he might later lead a Peelite/Whig/Liberal alliance. Peel was magnanimous towards Irish famine and permitted quick settlements of disputes at frontiers in India and America (Treaty of Amritsar (1846) on 16 March 1846 and Oregon Treaty on 15 June 1846) in order to repeal Corn Laws on 29 June 1846. As an aside in reference to the repeal of the Corn Laws, Peel managed to keep minimum casualties of Irish Famine in its first year, Peel did make some moves to subsidise the purchase of food for the Irish, but this attempt was small and had little tangible effect. In the age of laissez-faire, government taxes were small, and subsidies or direct economic interference was almost nonexistent. That subsidies were actually given was very much out of character for the political times; his successor, Lord John Russell, received more criticism than Peel on Irish policy, the worst year being 1847, despite all of Peel's efforts, his reform programmes had little effect on the situation in Ireland. Russell could not manage public distribution system during Irish Famine even though subsidized food from the United States was made available in Ireland. The repeal of the Corn Laws became more political than humanitarian.

== Later career and death ==
Peel did, however, retain a hard core of supporters, known as Peelites, and at one point in 1849 was actively courted by the Whig/Radical coalition. He continued to stand on his conservative principles, however, and refused. Nevertheless, he was influential on several important issues, including the furtherance of British free trade with the repeal of the Navigation Acts. Peel was a member of the committee that controlled the House of Commons Library, and on 16 April 1850 was responsible for passing the motion that controlled its scope and collection policy for the rest of the century.

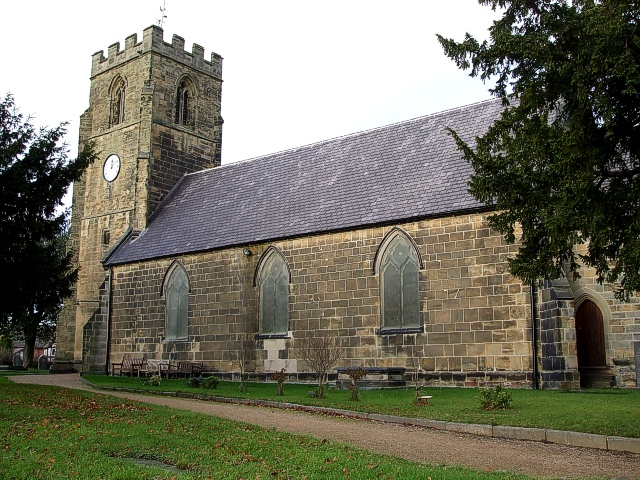
St Peter Church, Drayton Bassett, where Sir Robert Peel is buried in the churchyard

Peel was thrown from his horse while riding on Constitution Hill in London on 29 June 1850. The horse stumbled on top of him, and he died three days later on 2 July at the age of 62 due to a broken collarbone rupturing his subclavian vessels.

His body was buried in the churchyard of St Peter Church, Drayton Bassett. Inside the church is a memorial tablet which reads "In Memory of / The Rt Hon Sir Robert Peel, Bart. / to whome the People / have raised Monuments /in many places. / His Children / erect this in the place / where his body / has been buried".

His Peelite followers, led by Lord Aberdeen and William Gladstone, went on to fuse with the Whigs as the Liberal Party.

== Family ==
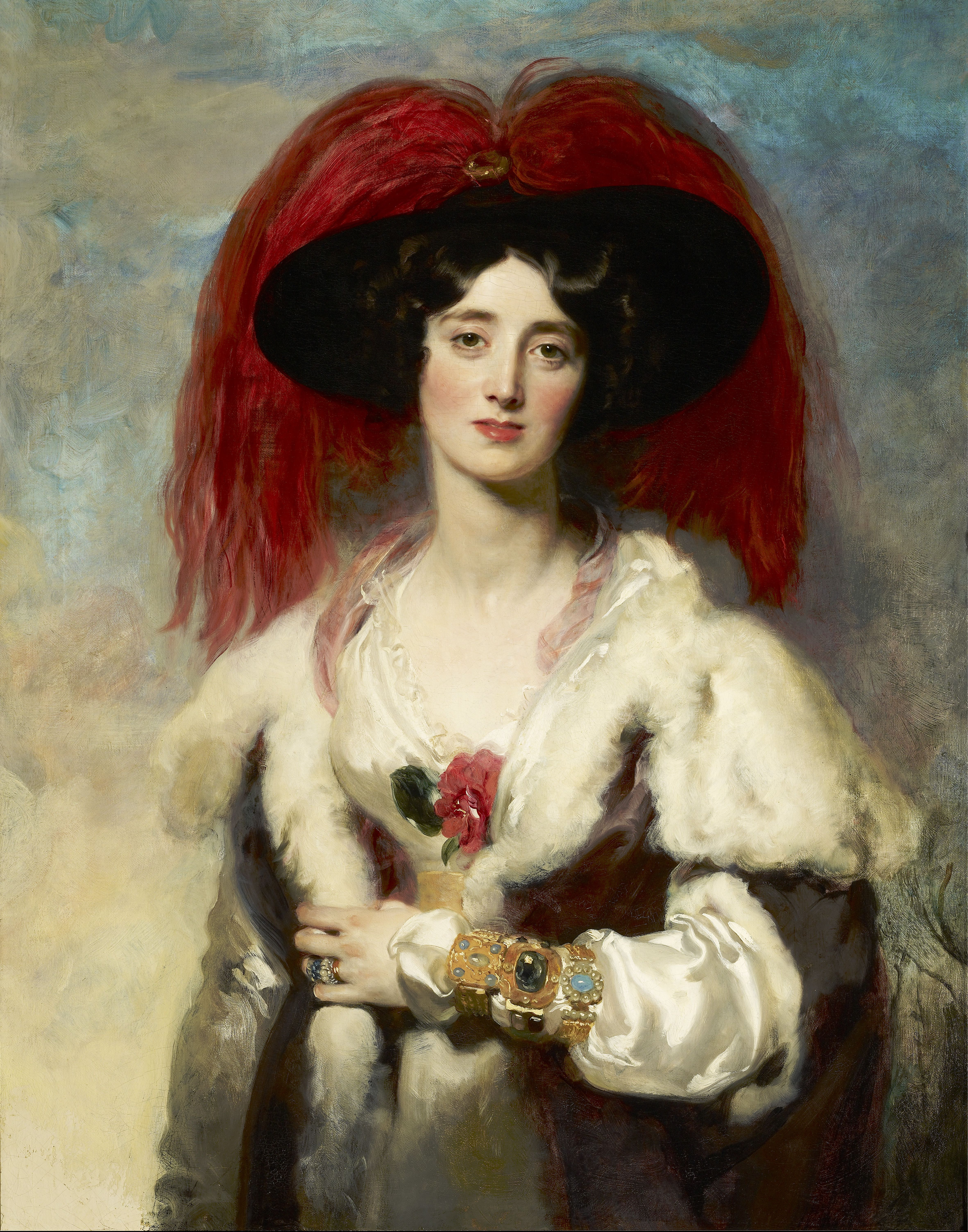
Thomas Lawrence's Portrait of Julia, Lady Peel (1827), now in the Frick Collection

Peel became engaged to Julia Floyd (1795–1859) (daughter of General Sir John Floyd, 1st Baronet, and his first wife Rebecca Darke) in March 1820; they married on 8 June 1820. They had seven children:

- Julia Peel (30 April 1821 – 14 August 1893). She married George Child Villiers, 6th Earl of Jersey, on 12 July 1841. They had five children. He died in 1859, and she married her second husband, Charles Brandling, on 12 September 1865.
- Sir Robert Peel, 3rd Baronet (4 May 1822 – 9 May 1895). He married Lady Emily Hay on 17 June 1856. They had five children. He succeeded his father in the baronetcy in 1850.
- Frederick Peel (26 October 1823 – 6 June 1906). He married Elizabeth Shelley (niece of the poet Percy Bysshe Shelley through his brother John) on 12 August 1857. She died on 30 July 1865. He was remarried to Janet Pleydell-Bouverie on 3 September 1879.
- William Peel (2 November 1824 – 27 April 1858), a captain in the Royal Navy.
- John Peel (24 May 1827 – 21 April 1910). He married Annie Jenny in 1851.
- Arthur Peel (3 August 1829 – 24 October 1912). He married Adelaide Dugdale, daughter of William Stratford Dugdale and Harriet Ella Portman, on 14 August 1862. They had seven children. He was created Viscount Peel in 1895; his eldest son William was created Earl Peel in 1929.
- Eliza Peel (c. 1832 – April 1883). She married the Hon. Francis Stonor (son of Thomas Stonor, 3rd Baron Camoys) on 25 September 1855. They had four children.

Lady Peel died in 1859. Some of their direct descendants now reside in South Africa, the Australian states of New South Wales, Queensland, Victoria and Tasmania, and in various parts of the United States and Canada.

== Legacy ==
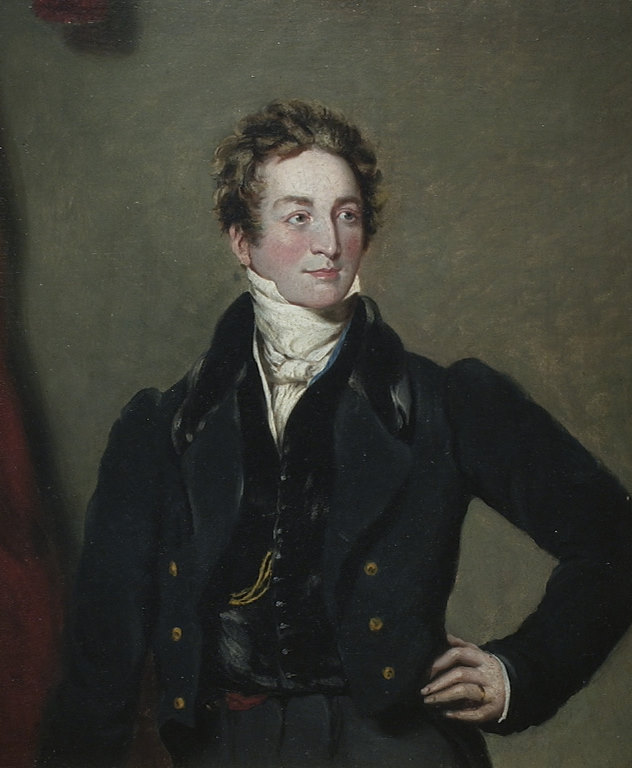
Portrait of Robert Peel by Thomas Lawrence

=== Memory and recognition ===
In his lifetime many critics called him a traitor to the Tory cause, or as "a Liberal wolf in sheep's clothing", because his final position reflected liberal ideas. Others idealised Peel in heroic terms; Thomas Carlyle referred to him as a "reforming Hercules" in Latter-Day Pamphlets (1850).

The latter would become the consensus view of scholars for much of the 20th century. Historian Boyd Hilton wrote that he was portrayed as:

The great Conservative patriot: a pragmatic gradualist, as superb in his grasp of fundamental issues as he was adroit in handling administrative detail, intelligent enough to see through abstract theories, a conciliator who put nation before party and established consensus politics.

The biographer Norman Gash wrote that Peel "looked first, not to party, but to the state; not to programmes, but to national expediency". Gash added that among his personal qualities were, "administrative skill, capacity for work, personal integrity, high standards, a sense of duty [and] an outstanding intellect".

Gash emphasised the role of personality in Peel's political career:

Peel was endowed with great intelligence and integrity, and an immense capacity for hard work. A proud, stubborn, and quick-tempered man he had a passion for creative achievement; and the latter part of his life was dominated by his deep concern for the social condition of the country. Though his great debating and administrative talents secured him an outstanding position in Parliament, his abnormal sensitivity and coldness of manner debarred him from popularity among his political followers, except for the small circle of his intimate friends. As an administrator he was one of the greatest public servants in British history; in politics he was a principal architect of the modern conservative tradition. By insisting on changes unpalatable to many of his party, he helped to preserve the flexibility of the parliamentary system and the survival of aristocratic influence. The repeal of the Corn Laws in 1846 won him immense prestige in the country, and his death in 1850 caused a national demonstration of sorrow unprecedented since the death of William Pitt in 1806.

Peel was the first British prime minister to have been photographed while in office. He is featured on the cover of the Beatles' Sgt. Pepper's Lonely Hearts Club Band album.

A study in 2021 in The Economic Journal found that the repeal of the corn laws adversely affected the welfare of the top 10 per cent of income-earners in Britain, whereas the bottom 90 per cent of income-earners gained.

A student association of the University of Glasgow, the Peel Club was founded in 1836 and named after Peel (who was a patron of the organisation). It later became the Glasgow University Conservative Association. In 2024 a group claiming to be the revived Peel Club was founded in Pall Mall, London.

=== Art collector ===
From 1820 Peel began amassing a major art collection, acquiring works by Dutch and Flemish Old Masters. He also commissioned a number of paintings by contemporary British artists including A Frost Scene by William Collins, Napoleon Musing at St Helena by Benjamin Robert Haydon and John Knox Preaching Before the Lords of Congregation by David Wilkie.

The biggest commissions Peel handed out were to Sir Thomas Lawrence, the President of the Royal Academy, who painted fifteen portraits for him between 1820 and his death in 1830. This made Peel Lawrence's greatest patron after George IV. The works Lawrence produced featured leading politicians and prominent figures of literature as well as portraits of Peel's family, notably his 1827 Portrait of Julia, Lady Peel. Peel displayed his Old Masters in his London residence at Whitehall Gardens, while Lawrence's portraits were located in a dedicated gallery at Drayton Manor. Many of these works were then sold by his son to the National Gallery in London in 1871.

== Memorials ==
=== Statues ===
Statues of Sir Robert Peel are found in the following British and Australian locations:

- Memorial outside the Robert Peel public house in Bury town centre, his birthplace, by Edward Hodges Baily.
- Winckley Square in Preston city centre, by Thomas Duckett Senior
- West Midlands Police Training Centre, Edgbaston, Birmingham, by Peter Hollins.
- Piccadilly Gardens in Manchester, by William Calder Marshall
- Montrose town centre, by Alexander Handyside Ritchie.
- Woodhouse Moor, Leeds, by William Behnes
- Tamworth Castle, by an unknown artist
- George Square, Glasgow, by John Mossman.
- Peel Park, Bradford, by William Behnes
- Wool Exchange, Bradford.
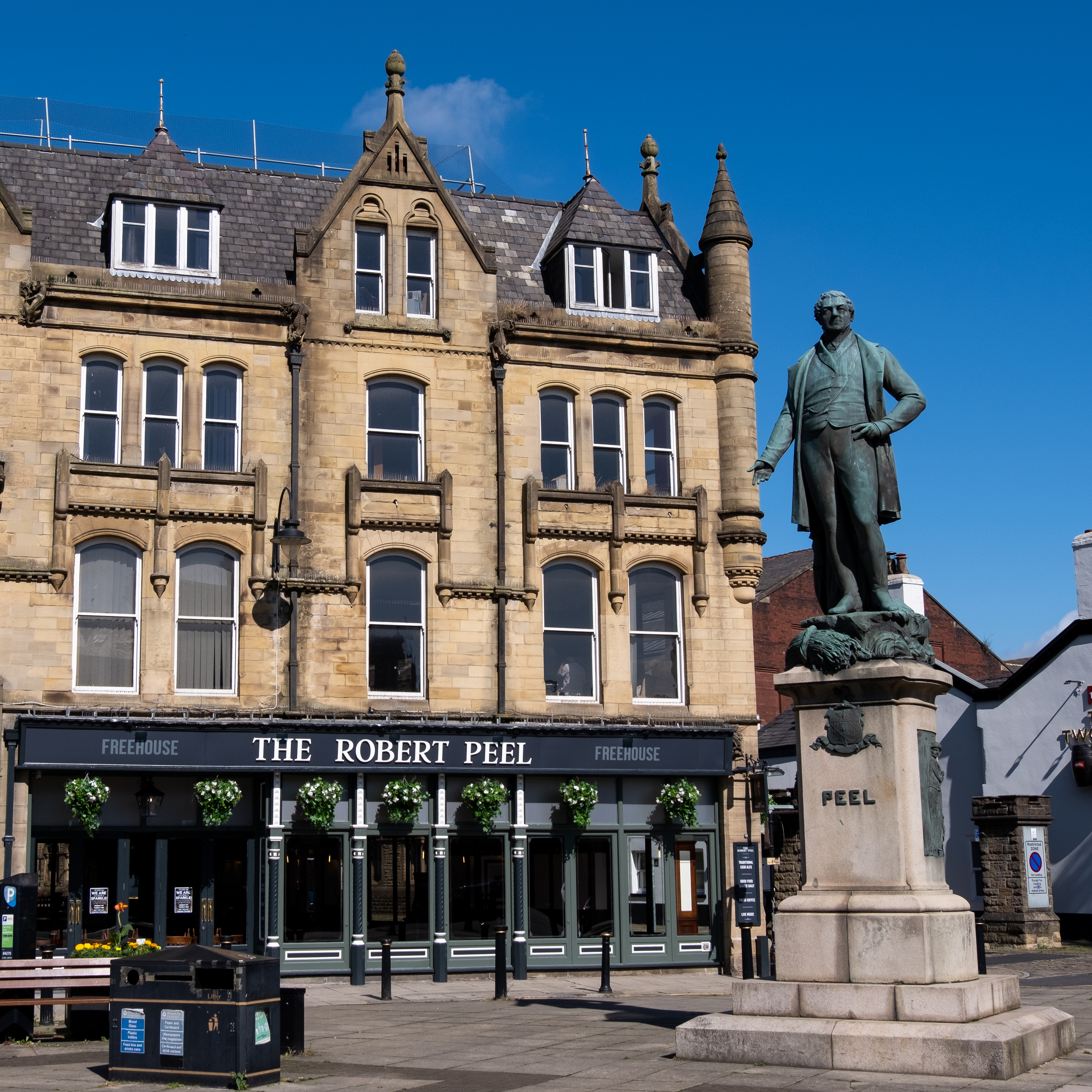
Statue in Bury

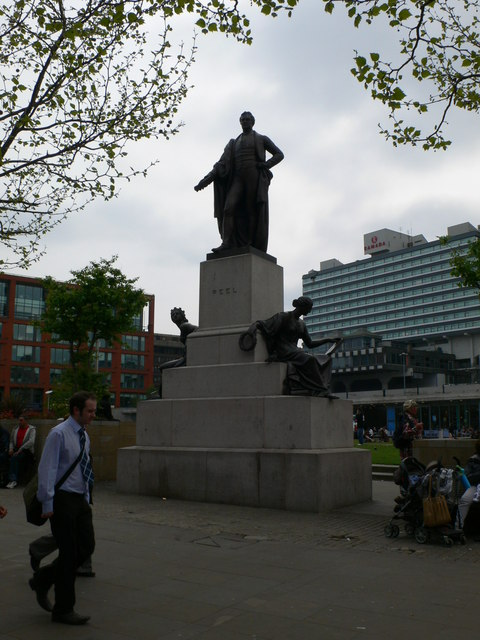
Statue in Piccadilly Gardens, Manchester

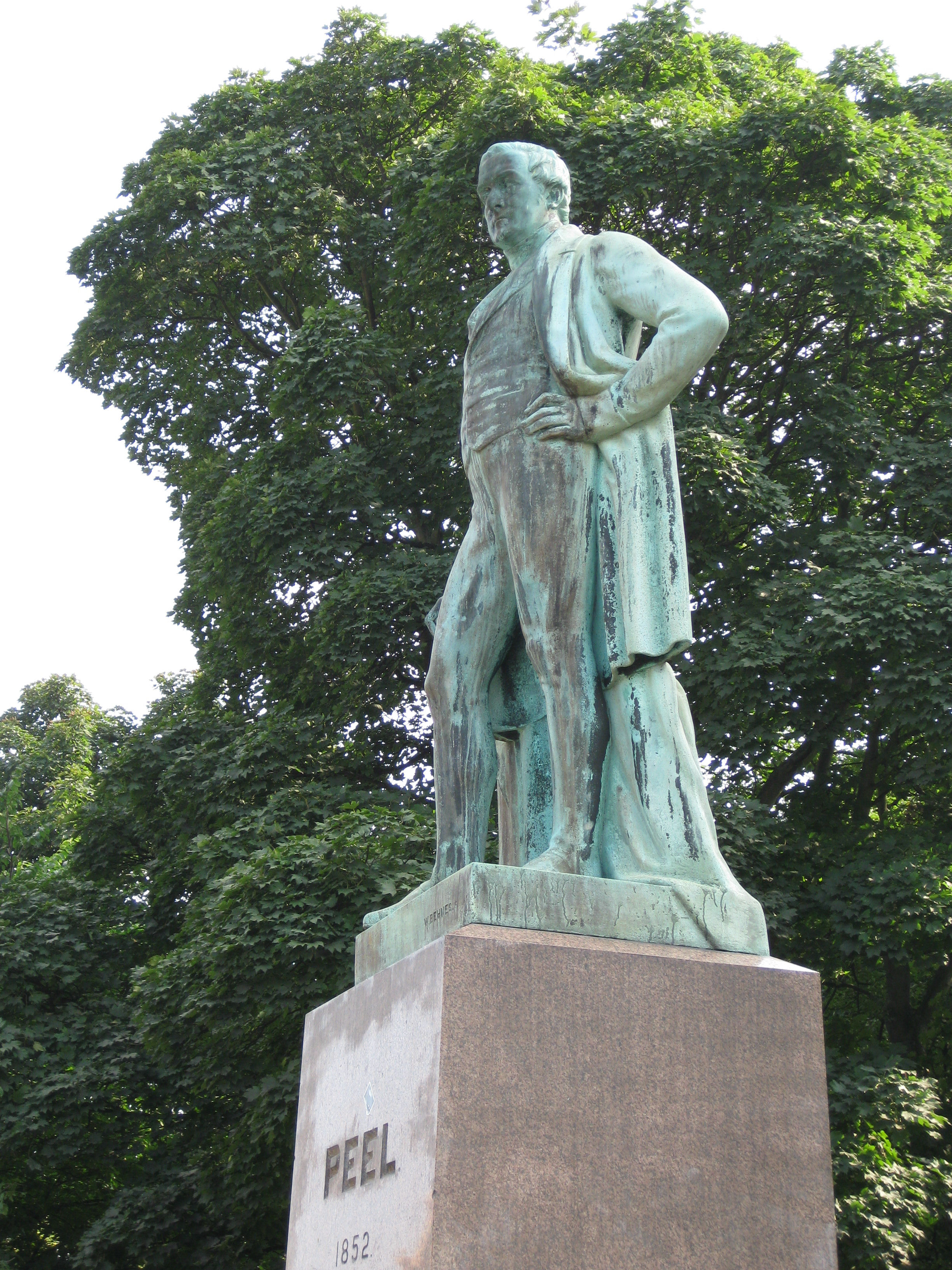
Statue in Woodhouse Moor, Leeds

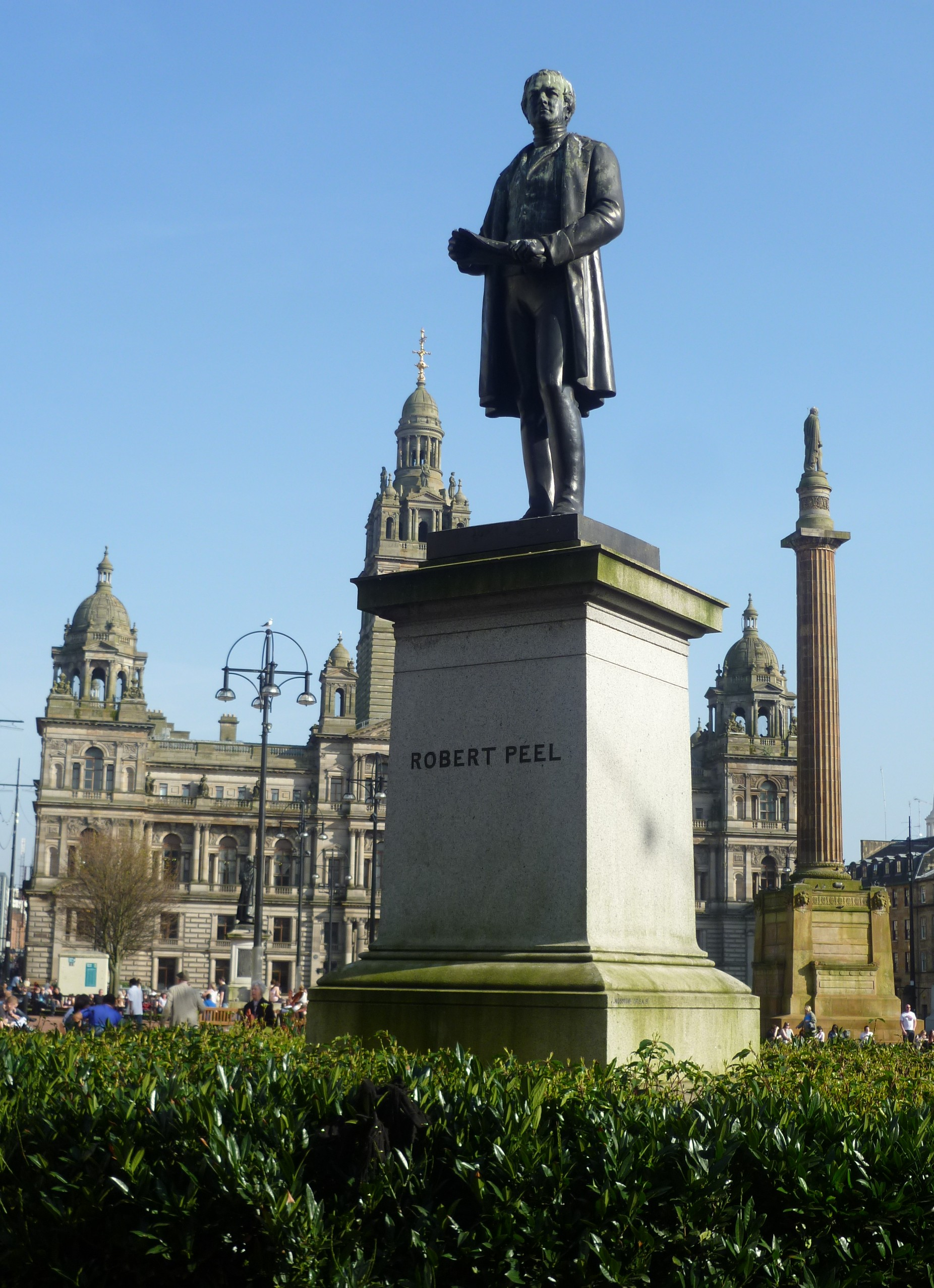
Statue in George Square, Glasgow

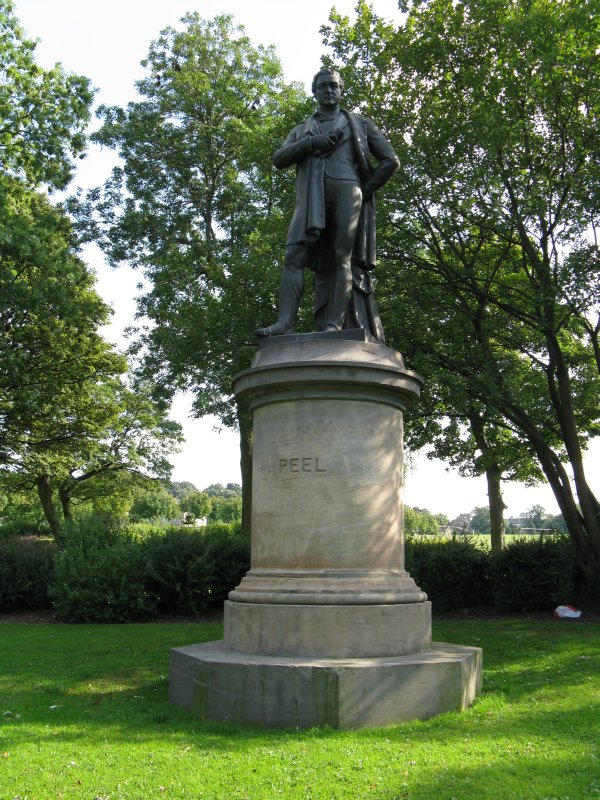
Statue in Peel Park, Bradford

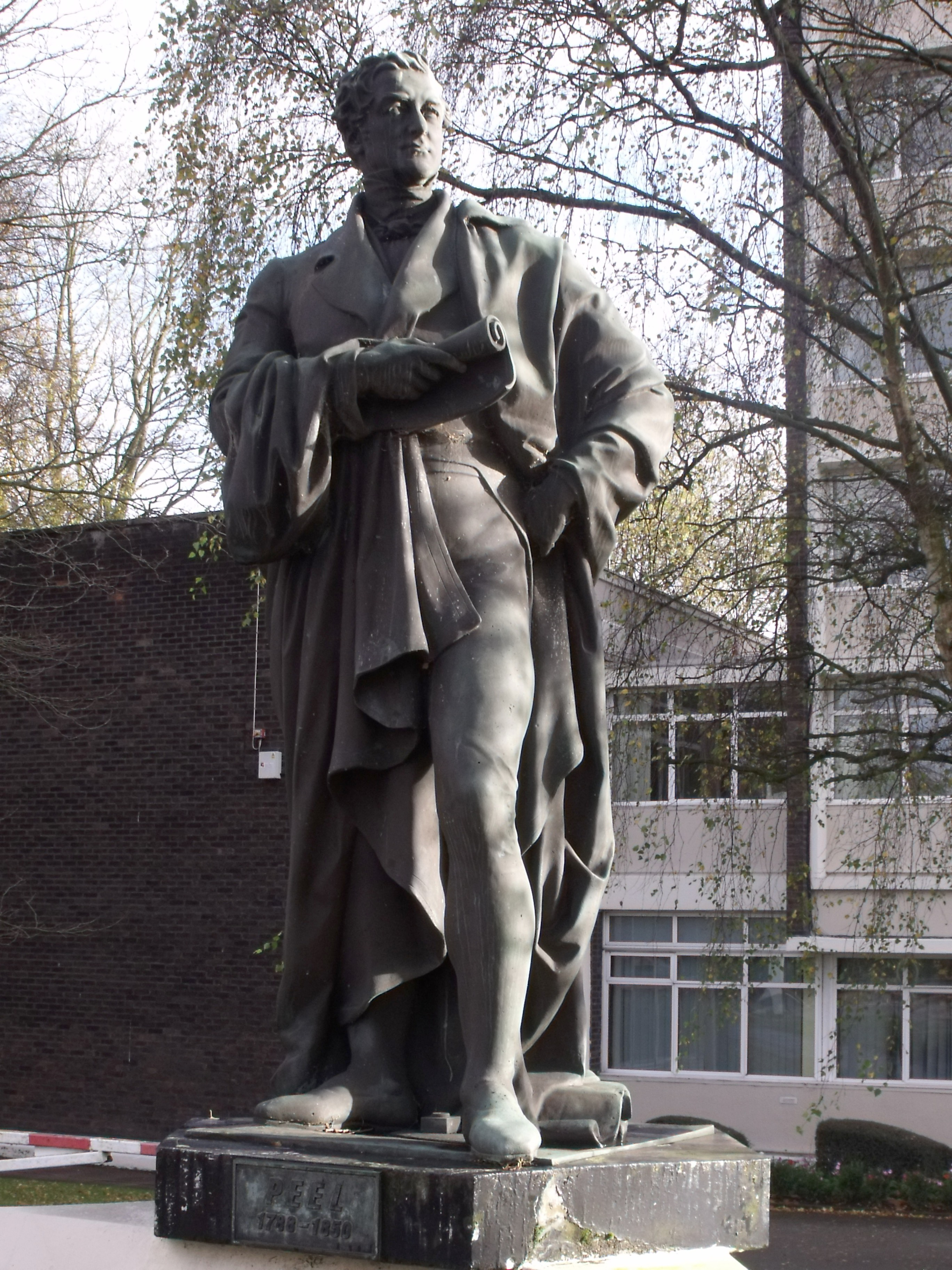
Statue in Edgbaston, Birmingham

Several others in bust and full-length are by Matthew Noble, the best-known artist to have depicted him:

- New Scotland Yard, London (collection of the Metropolitan Police Museum)
- Parliament Square, London.
- National Portrait Gallery, London
- Bank of England Museum, London
- Peel Centre, Hendon Police College, Hendon.
- Gawsworth Old Hall, Cheshire.
- Tamworth town centre.
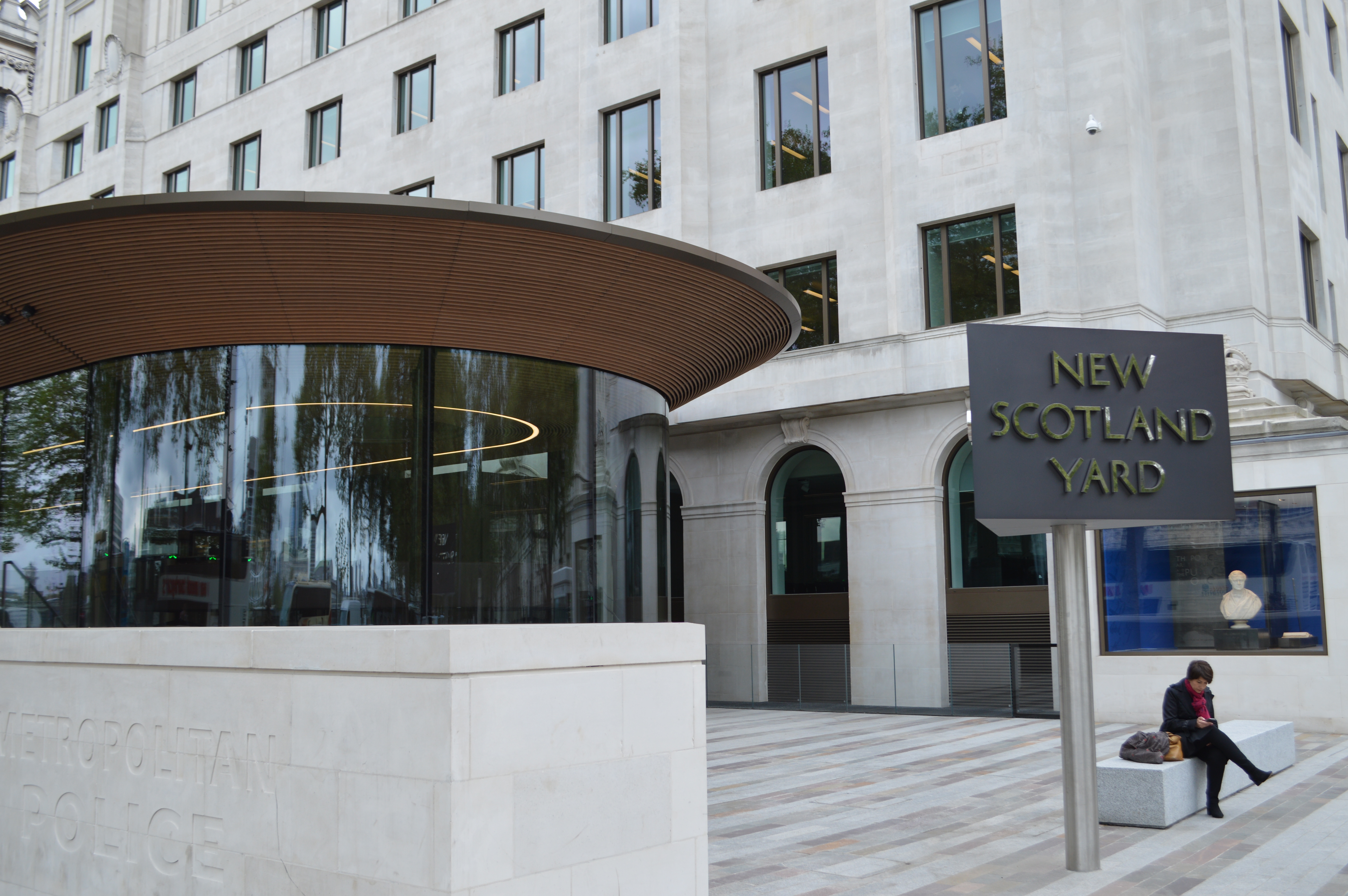
New Scotland Yard (bottom right)

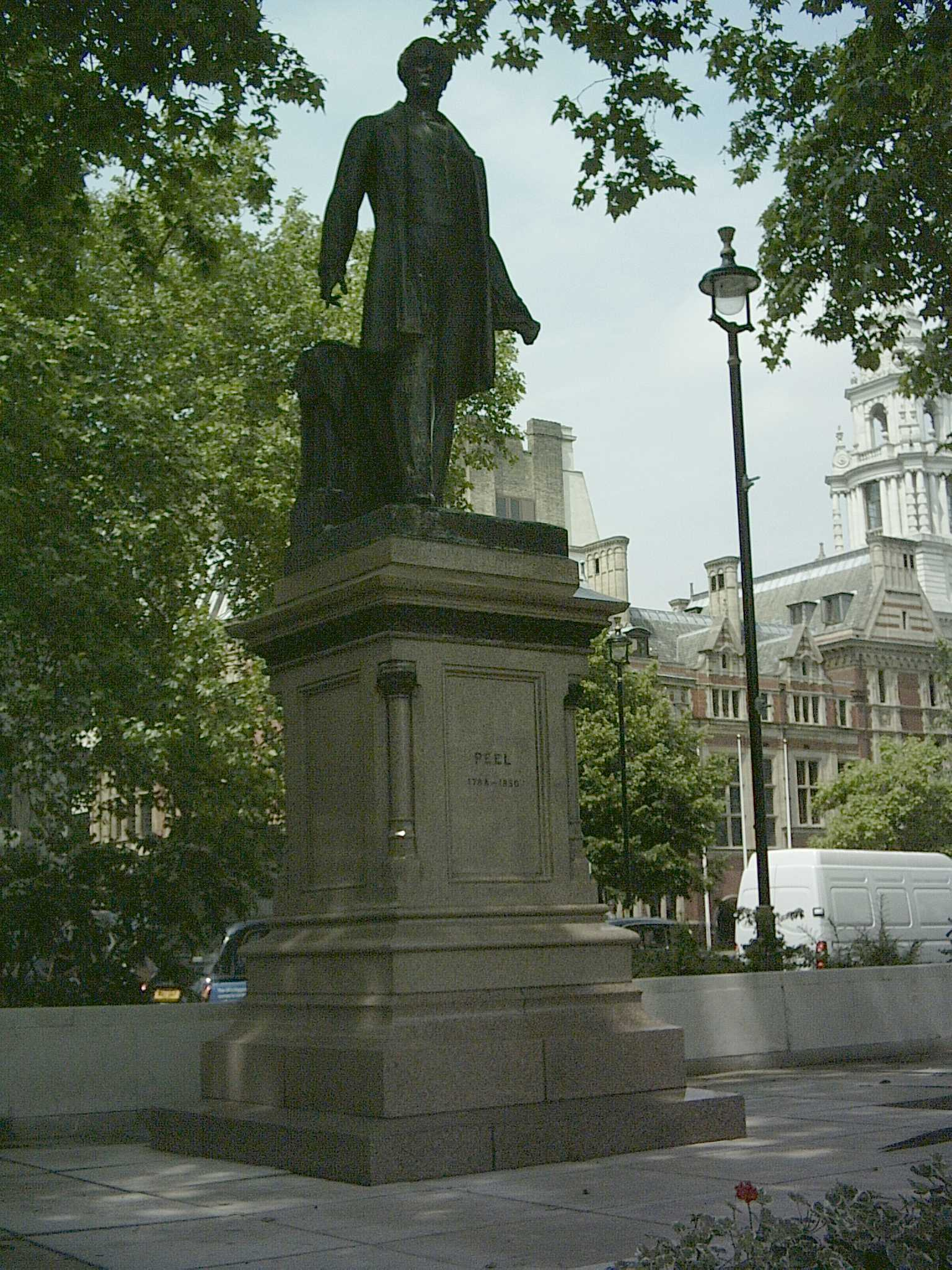
Statue in Parliament Square, London

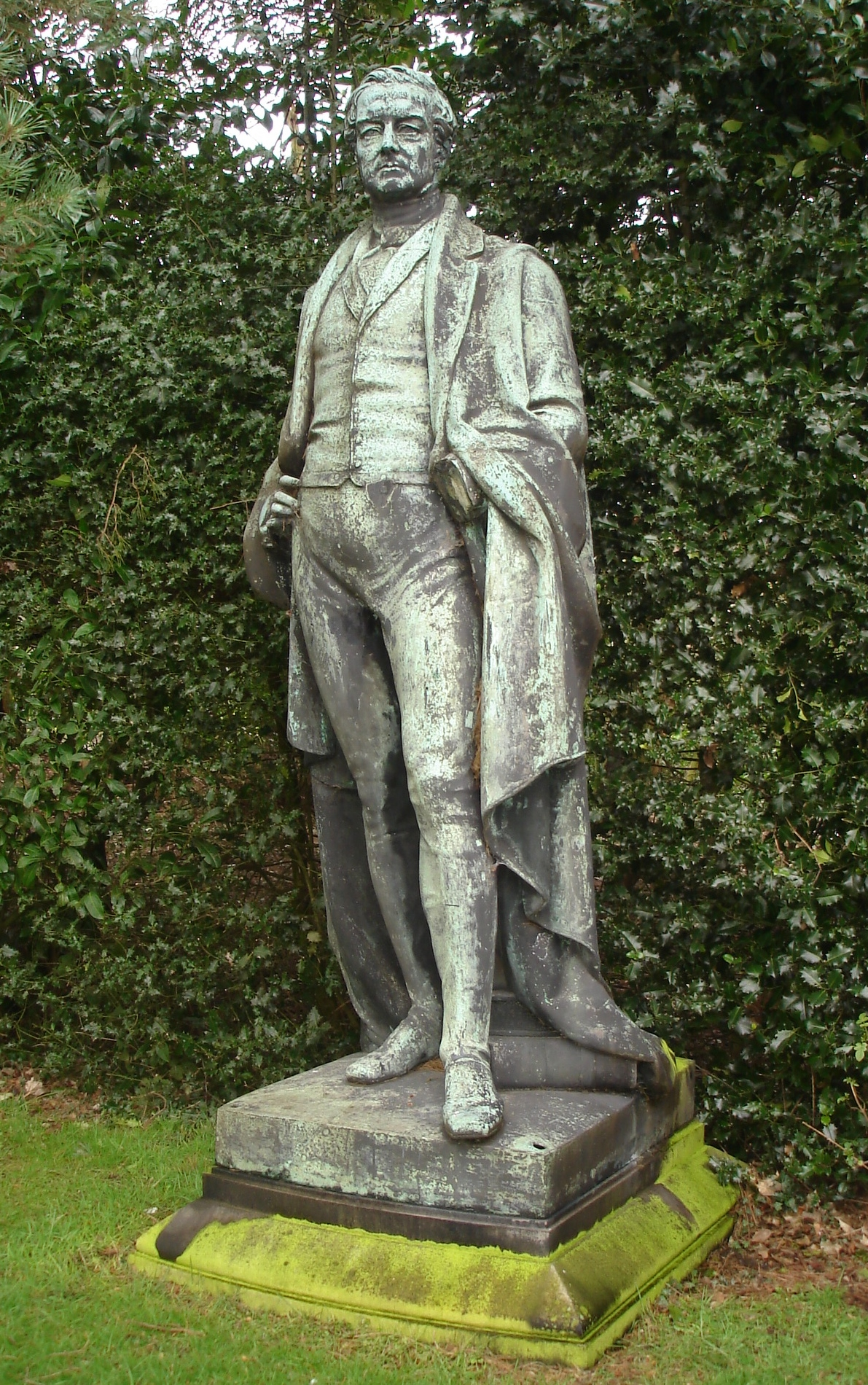
Statue near Gawsworth Old Hall

=== Public houses and hotels ===
The following public houses, bars or hotels are named after Peel:

==== United Kingdom ====
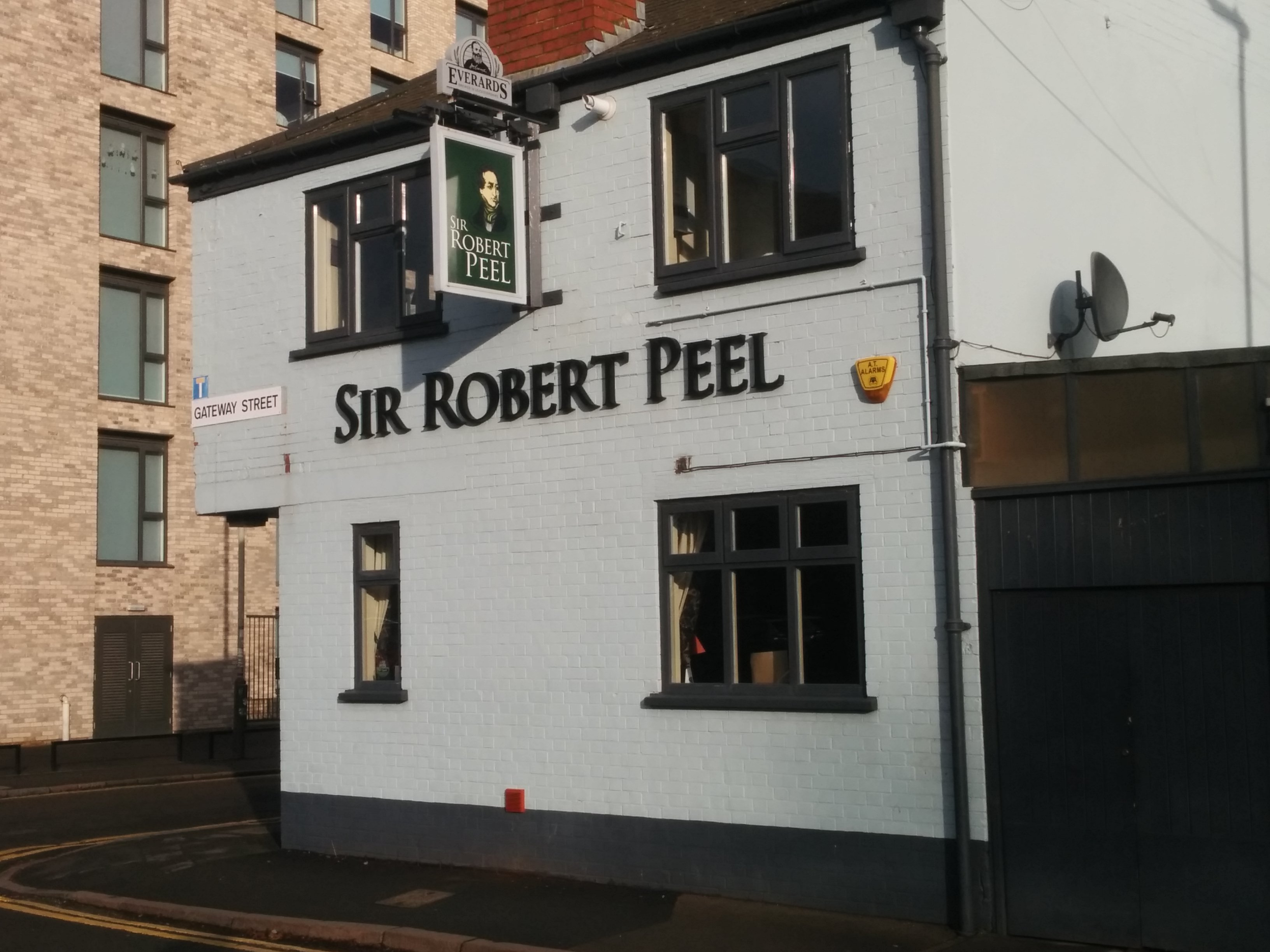
Sir Robert Peel pub, Leicester

- Sir Robert Peel pub Bury, behind his statue Former Wetherspoon.
- Sir Robert Peel public house, Tamworth.
- Peel Hotel, Tamworth.
- Sir Robert Peel public house, Edgeley, Stockport, Cheshire.
- Sir Robert Peel public house, Heckmondwike, West Yorkshire.
- Sir Robert Peel public house, Leicester.
- Sir Robert Peel public house, Malden Road, London NW5.
- Sir Robert Peel public house, Peel Precinct, Kilburn, London NW6.
- Sir Robert Peel public house, London SE17.
- Sir Robert Peel Hotel, Preston.
- Peel Park Hotel, Accrington, Lancashire.
- Sir Robert Peel public house Rowley Regis.
- Sir Robert Peel public house, Southsea.
- Sir Robert Peel public house, Stoke-on-Trent.
- Sir Robert Peel public house, Kingston upon Thames, Surrey.
- Sir Robert Peel public house, Bloxwich, Walsall.

==== Elsewhere ====
- The Sir Robert Peel Hotel (colloquially known as "The Peel"), a gay bar and nightclub located at the corner of Peel and Wellington Streets in the Melbourne suburb of Collingwood, in Australia.
- The Sir Robert Peel Hotel on the corner of Queensberry Street and Peel Street in the Melbourne suburb of North Melbourne, Victoria, in Australia.
- The Sir Robert Peel Motor Lodge Hotel, Alexandria Bay, New York.

=== Other memorials ===
- Peel Park, Bradford, is named after Sir Robert Peel. It is one of the largest parks in the city, and indeed Yorkshire.
- Peel Park, Salford, is named after Sir Robert Peel.
- The Peel Monument, built on top of Holcombe Hill in Ramsbottom, Bury.
- The Sir Robert Peel Hospital in Tamworth.
- A small monument (without a statue) in the centre of the town of Dronfield in Derbyshire. Nearby is the Peel Centre, a community centre in a former Methodist church.
- Peel Streets in the CBD of Melbourne, and in Collingwood, both in Victoria, Australia.
- Peel Street in the CBD, Adelaide, South Australia.
- Peel Street in Prospect, Launceston, Tasmania, Australia.
- Peel Street in Montreal and its Peel Metro station. The street also features a high-rise residential building named Sir-Robert-Peel.
- The Peel River in Tamworth, New South Wales, Australia.
- Peel High School in Tamworth, New South Wales, Australia.
- Peel in New South Wales, Australia.
- Robert Peel Primary School in Sandy, Bedfordshire.
- A British steamer named SS Sir Robert Peel, based in Canada, was burned by American forces on 29 May 1838, at the height of American-Canadian tensions over the Caroline affair.
- Tamworth-raised musician Julian Cope sings "the king and queen have offered me the estate of Robert Peel" on the song "Laughing Boy", from his 1984 LP Fried.
- The right wing of the Trafford Centre is called Peel Avenue, named after Robert Peel.
- The official mascot of Bury Football Club is Robbie the Bobby, in honour of Sir Robert Peel.
- One of the buildings which make up the Home Office headquarters, 2 Marsham Street, is named Peel.
- The Peel building, situated on Peel Campus of the University of Salford.
- The Sir Robert Peel monument on the corner of George and High Streets, Montrose, Scotland
- Peel Crescent in Mansfield, Nottinghamshire, UK.
- Peel Street, Hong Kong, a small street in Hong Kong.
- The Peel River in the Yukon and Northwest Territories, Canada.
- Peel Street in Simcoe, Ontario, Canada, is named in his honour.
- The Regional Municipality of Peel (originally Peel County) in Ontario, Canada.
  - 10 Peel Centre Drive and Peel Centre.
  - Peel Regional Police.
  - Peel Regional Paramedic Services.
  - Dufferin-Peel Catholic District School Board.
  - Peel District School Board.
  - former Peel Memorial Hospital (closed 2007) in Brampton, Ontario.
- New Zealand pioneer Francis Jollie settled in Canterbury in 1853 and named Peel Forest after the former prime minister, as he had died in the year that Canterbury was founded. The adjacent mountain and the settlement that formed also took Peel's name.
- The names "bobbies" and "peelers" for British police officers.
- Peel's Acts are named after Peel.

=== In literature ===
Letitia Elizabeth Landon gave her tribute to Peel in her poetical illustration Sir Robert Peel to Thomas Lawrence's portrait in Fisher's Drawing Room Scrap Book, 1837.

Robert Peel is a secondary character in the novel Dodger by Terry Pratchett.

Peel is an unseen nemesis of Harry Flashman in the humorous Flashman novels by George MacDonald Fraser. A young Flashman regularly battled with Peel's nascent London police force.

== Arms ==
Coat of arms of Robert Peel
Crest A demi lion rampant Argent gorged with a collar Azure charged with three bezants, holding between the paws a shuttle Or. Escutcheon Argent three sheaves of as many arrows Proper banded Gules; on a chief Azure a bee volant, Or. Motto INDUSTRIA

== See also ==
- Peelian principles, to define an ethical police force.
- Ultra-Tories, Peel's right-wing enemies

Political offices
Preceded by William Wellesley-Pole	Chief Secretary for Ireland; 1812–1818	Succeeded by Charles Grant
Preceded by The Viscount Sidmouth	Home Secretary; 1822–1827	Succeeded by William Sturges Bourne
Preceded by William Huskisson	Leader of the House of Commons; 1828–1830	Succeeded by The Viscount Althorp
Preceded by The Marquess of Lansdowne	Home Secretary; 1828–1830	Succeeded by The Viscount Melbourne
Preceded by The Duke of Wellington	Prime Minister of the United Kingdom; 10 December 1834 – 8 April 1835	Succeeded by The Viscount Melbourne
Preceded by The Lord Denman	Chancellor of the Exchequer; 1834–1835	Succeeded by Thomas Spring Rice
Preceded by Lord John Russell	Leader of the House of Commons; 1834–1835	Succeeded by Lord John Russell
Preceded by The Viscount Melbourne	Prime Minister of the United Kingdom; 30 August 1841 – 29 June 1846	Succeeded by Lord John Russell
Preceded by Lord John Russell	Leader of the House of Commons; 1841–1846	Succeeded by Lord John Russell
Parliament of the United Kingdom
Preceded by Quintin Dick	Member of Parliament for Cashel; 1809–1812	Succeeded by Sir Charles Saxton, Bt
Preceded by John Maitland; James Dawkins	Member of Parliament for Chippenham; 1812–1817; With: Charles Brooke	Succeeded by Charles Brooke; John Maitland
Preceded by William Scott; Charles Abbot	Member of Parliament for Oxford University; 1817–1829; With: William Scott 1817–1821; Richard Heber 1821–1826; Thomas Grimston Estcourt 1826–1829	Succeeded by Thomas Grimston Estcourt; Sir Robert Inglis
Preceded by Sir Manasseh Masseh Lopes; Sir George Warrender	Member of Parliament for Westbury; 1829–1830; With: Sir George Warrender	Succeeded by Sir Alexander Grant; Michael Prendergast
Preceded by William Yates Peel; Lord Charles Townshend	Member of Parliament for Tamworth; 1830–1850; With: Lord Charles Townshend 1830–1835; William Yates Peel 1835–1837, 1847; Edward Henry A'Court 1837–1847; John Townshend 1847–1850	Succeeded by John Townshend; Sir Robert Peel
Party political offices
Preceded by The Duke of Wellington	Leader of the Conservative Party; 1834–1846	Succeeded by The Lord Stanley
First None recognised before	Conservative Leader of the Commons; 1834–1846	Succeeded by The Lord George Bentinck
Academic offices
Preceded by The Lord Stanley	Rector of the University of Glasgow; 1836–1838	Succeeded by Sir James Graham
Baronetage of Great Britain
Preceded by Robert Peel	Baronet of Drayton Manor and Bury; 1830–1850	Succeeded by Robert Peel
