= Edmund Peel =

English politician

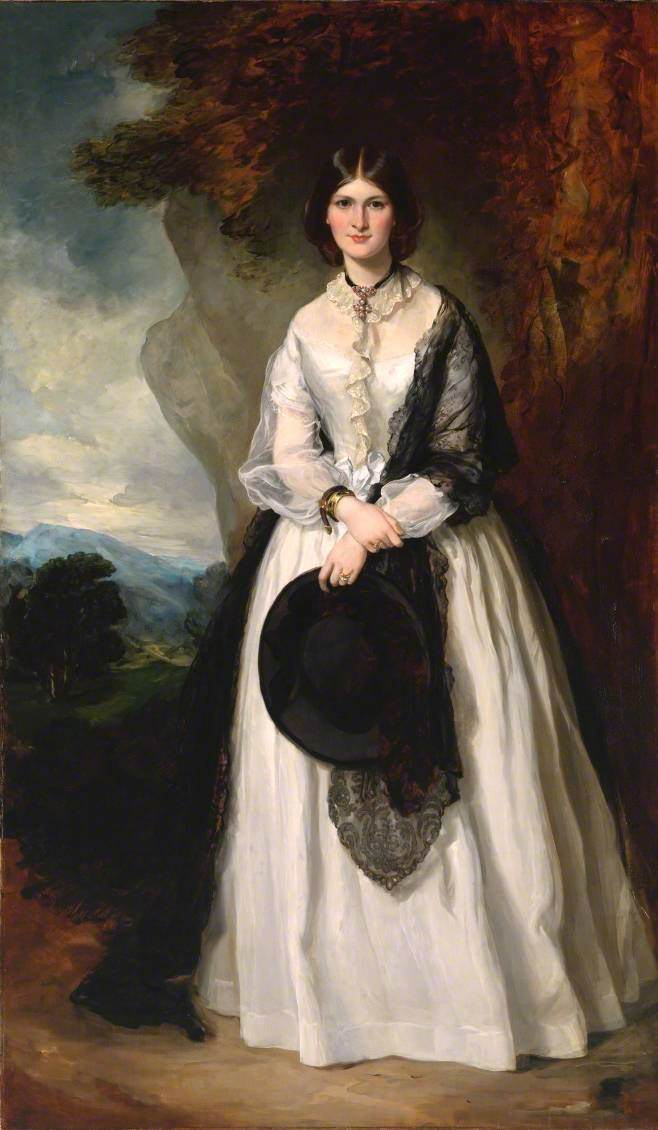
A portrait by Francis Grant, with sitter tentatively identified with Peel's wife Emily

Edmund Peel (8 August 1791 – 1 November 1850) was an English politician who was Member of Parliament for Newcastle-under-Lyme from 1831 to 1832 and 1835 to 1837.

Peel was the son of Sir Robert Peel, and the brother of the former Prime Minister Sir Robert Peel. He was educated at Harrow School.

== Family ==
Peel married in 1812, Emily Swinfen, daughter of John Swinfen. The couple had three sons and a daughter.
