= Lord Charles Townshend (1785–1853) =

British politician (1785–1853)

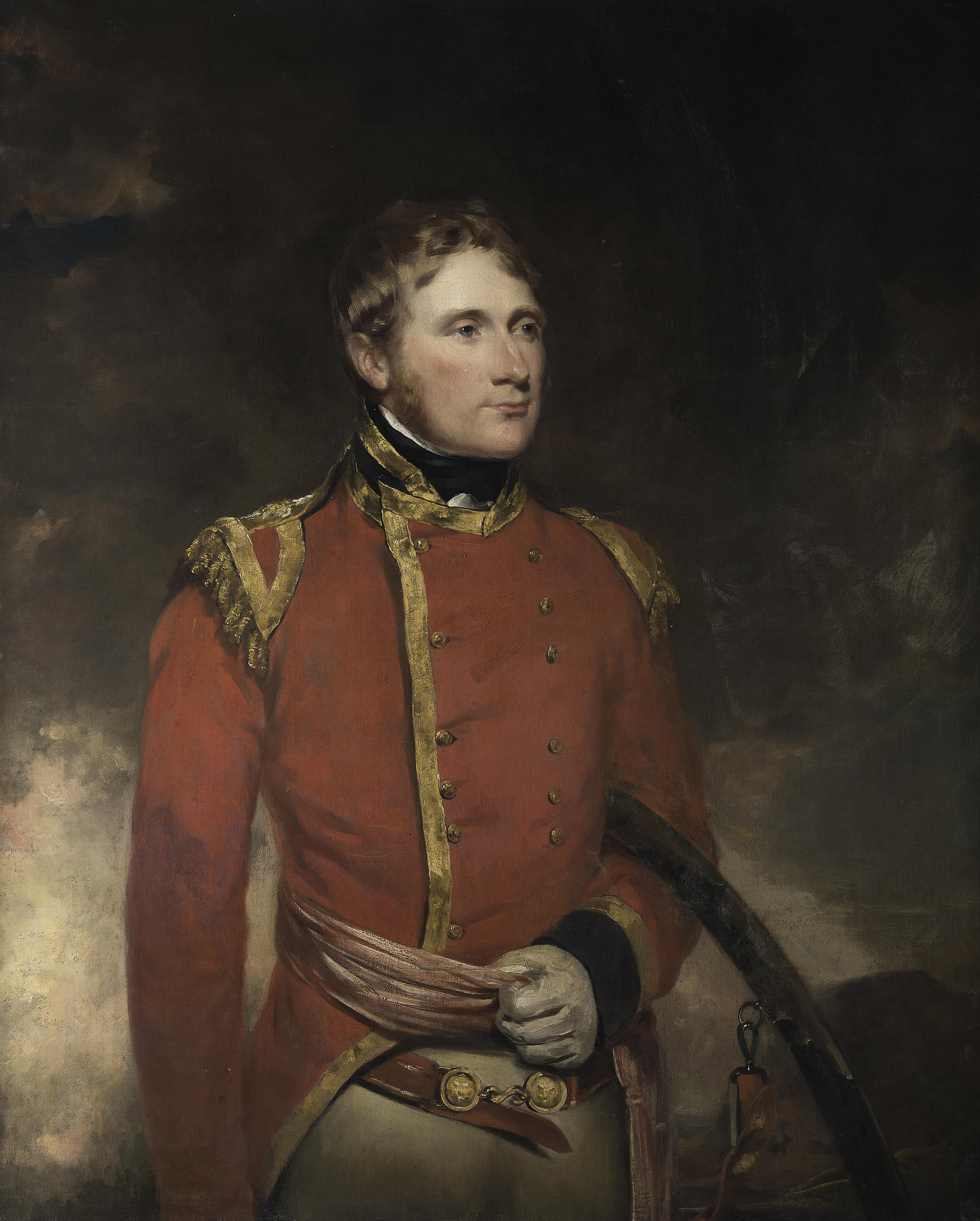
- portrait attributed to William Beechey

Member of the British Parliament for Tamworth
- In office 1812–1818

Member of the British Parliament for Tamworth
- In office 1820–1835

Personal details
- Born: 16 September 1785
- Died: 5 November 1853 (aged 68)
- Spouse: Charlotte Loftus
- Parent: George Townshend, 2nd Marquess Townshend (father)

Military service
- Rank: captain
- Unit: Norfolk Rangers; Norfolk Yeoman Cavalry

Lord Charles Vere Ferrers Townshend (16 September 1785 – 5 November 1853) was a British politician.

Townshend was the second son of George Townshend, 2nd Marquess Townshend, and his wife Charlotte (née Mainwaring-Ellerker) of Risby Park, Yorkshire. He was returned to Parliament as one of two representatives for Tamworth in 1812, a seat he held until 1818, and again between 1820 and 1835. He was initially elected in the family interest, when his family owned Tamworth Castle, but could not expect to continue in 1818 after the Townshend trustees had sold the castle, but was defeated when Sir Robert Peel, 1st Baronet, the owner of Drayton Manor in nearby Drayton Bassett and his son William canvassed against him. However he was re-elected unopposed in 1820.

Townshend died in November 1853, aged 68, having previously repurchased Tamworth Castle.

== Notes ==
Parliament of the United Kingdom
Preceded by Sir Robert Peel, 1st Bt; William Loftus	Member of Parliament for Tamworth; 1812 – 1818; With: Sir Robert Peel, 1st Bt	Succeeded by Sir Robert Peel, 1st Bt; William Yates Peel
Preceded by Sir Robert Peel, 2nd Bt; William Yates Peel	Member of Parliament for Tamworth; 1830 – 1835; With: William Yates Peel 1820–1830; Sir Robert Peel, 2nd Bt 1830–1835	Succeeded by Sir Robert Peel, 2nd Bt; William Yates Peel
