= William Yates Peel =

British politician

Personal details
- Born: 3 August 1789
- Died: 1 June 1858 (aged 68) Baginton Hall, Warwickshire
- Party: Tory
- Spouse: Lady Jane Elizabeth Moore
- Children: 16 (six sons, ten daughters)
- Education: St John's College, Cambridge

William Yates Peel (3 August 1789 – 1 June 1858) was a British Tory politician.

Peel was the second son of Sir Robert Peel, 1st Baronet, and his first wife Ellen (née Yates). He was the younger brother of Prime Minister Sir Robert Peel, 2nd Baronet, and the elder brother of Jonathan Peel. He was educated at Harrow and St John's College, Cambridge. Peel sat as Member of Parliament for Bossiney from 1817 to 1818, for Tamworth from 1818 to 1830, 1835 to 1837 and in 1847, for Yarmouth from 1830 to 1831 and for Cambridge University from 1831 to 1832, and served under the Duke of Wellington as Under-Secretary of State for the Home Department from 1828 to 1830 and as a Lord of the Treasury under Wellington in 1830 and again under his brother Sir Robert Peel from 1834 to 1835. In 1834 he was admitted to the Privy Council.

== Family ==
Peel married Lady Jane Elizabeth Moore, daughter of Stephen Moore, 2nd Earl Mount Cashell, and his wife Margaret King, on 8 July 1819 at St Marylebone Parish Church, London. They had six sons and ten daughters, all bar two sons survived childhood.

- Robert Moore Peel (1820 – 17 October 1878)
- Ellen Peel (born 1821)
- William Yates Peel (1822 – 20 January 1879)
- Edmund Peel (born c. 1823, died young)
- Elizabeth Peel (born 4 May 1824)
- Jane Peel (born 14 July 1825)
- Julia Augusta Peel (born 13 July 1826)
- Matilda Katherine Peel (born 8 July 1827)
- Alice Anne Peel (born 10 July 1828)
- Adelaide Elizabeth Peel (born 10 July 1828)
- Henry Peel (born 1 October 1829, died young)
- Octavia Peel (born 1830)
- Emily Peel (born 15 December 1831)
- Frederick Peel (16 August 1833 – 31 March 1915) – father of diplomat Arthur Peel
- Francis Peel (1835 – 3 September 1894) – the father of Robert Francis Peel
- Flora Jane Peel (2 March 1837 – 1876)

Peel's wife died in Warwickshire in 1847. He survived her by eleven years and died at his residence in Baginton Hall, Warwickshire, in June 1858, aged 68.

== Sources ==
- Lee, Sidney, ed. (1895). "Peel, Robert (1750-1830)" . Dictionary of National Biography. Vol. 44. London: Smith, Elder & Co.
- Peel, George; Curthoys, M. C. "Peel, William Yates (1789–1858)". Oxford Dictionary of National Biography (online ed.). Oxford University Press. doi:10.1093/ref:odnb/21767. (Subscription, Wikipedia Library access or UK public library membership required.)

Parliament of the United Kingdom
Preceded by James Stuart-Wortley-Mackenzie; The Earl of Desart	Member of Parliament for Bossiney; 1817–1818; With: James Stuart-Wortley-Mackenzie	Succeeded by James Stuart-Wortley-Mackenzie; Sir Compton Domvile, Bt
Preceded by Sir Robert Peel, Bt; Lord Charles Townshend	Member of Parliament for Tamworth; 1818–1830; With: Sir Robert Peel, Bt 1818–1820; Lord Charles Townshend 1820–1830	Succeeded by Lord Charles Townshend; Sir Robert Peel, Bt
Preceded by Joseph Phillimore; Thomas Wallace	Member of Parliament for Yarmouth; 1830–1831; With: George Lowther Thompson	Succeeded by Sir Henry Willoughby, Bt; Charles Cavendish
Preceded by The Viscount Palmerston; William Cavendish	Member of Parliament for Cambridge University; 1831–1832; With: Henry Goulburn	Succeeded by Henry Goulburn; Charles Manners-Sutton
Preceded by Lord Charles Townshend; Sir Robert Peel, Bt	Member of Parliament for Tamworth; 1835–1837; With: Sir Robert Peel, Bt	Succeeded by Sir Robert Peel, Bt; Edward Henry A'Court
Preceded by Sir Robert Peel, Bt; Edward Henry A'Court	Member of Parliament for Tamworth; 1847; With: Sir Robert Peel, Bt	Succeeded by Sir Robert Peel, Bt; John Townshend
Political offices
Preceded by Thomas Spring Rice	Under-Secretary of State for the Home Department; 1828–1830	Succeeded by Sir George Clerk, Bt
