= Sir Robert Peel, 1st Baronet =

British politician (1750–1830)

Sir Robert Peel Bt MP
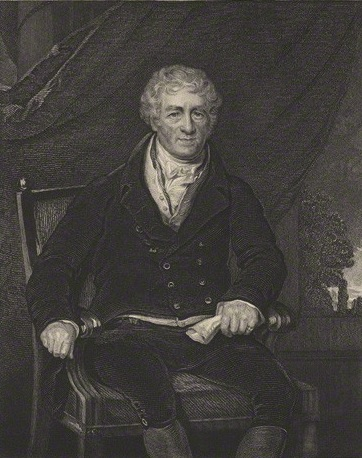
- Engraving of Sir Robert Peel, 1st Baronet, by John Henry Robinson (mid 19th century) Painted by Thomas Lawrence

Member of Parliament for Tamworth
- In office 1790–1820
- Preceded by: John Calvert
- Succeeded by: Lord Charles Townshend

Personal details
- Born: 25 April 1750
- Died: 3 May 1830 (aged 80)
- Spouse: Ellen Yates
- Children: Mary Peel; Elizabeth Peel; Sir Robert Peel; William Yates Peel; Edmund Peel; Eleanor Peel; Anne Peel; John Peel; Gen. Jonathan Peel; Laurence Peel; Harriet Peel
- Occupation: Politician; Industrialist

Sir Robert Peel, 1st Baronet (25 April 1750 – 3 May 1830), was a British politician and industrialist and one of the early textile manufacturers of the Industrial Revolution. He was one of the ten known British millionaires in 1799.

He was the father of Sir Robert Peel, twice Prime Minister of the United Kingdom.

== Background ==
Peel's father Robert "Parsley" Peel and grandfather William Peel(e) were yeomen. They were also engaged in the adult and infant textile industry, then organised on the basis of the domestic system (most of the work being undertaken in the home).

== Business career ==
Like many others, Peel joined partnerships to raise the capital required to set up spinning mills. These were water powered (usually using the water frame invented by Richard Arkwright), and thus by rivers and powerful streams in country districts. Peel partnered with William Yates to set up a mill and housing for their workers at Burrs near Bury. As elsewhere, the shortage of labour in the rural districts was mitigated by employing pauper children as 'apprentices', imported from any locality that wanted them off their hands. They were housed in a kind of hostel. Sir Robert Peel advocated for or sided with progressive reforms in legislation, worker's rights and the first near-national system of vital healthcare (poor law union workhouse trained and dedicated infirmaries) enduring through 19th century Britain and beyond.

Through employing a growing workforce and investing in owning and co-managing a cotton processing/cloth manufacturing business and a calico-printing business, he became a millionaire, and lived, as one of his two main homes, at Chamber Hall in Bury, where his more famous son was born. Peel was listed as a subscriber to the Manchester, Bolton and Bury Canal navigation in 1791. He also built the first factory in nearby Radcliffe.

== Political career ==
In politics, Peel was a 'Church and King' Tory and a staunch supporter of William Pitt the Younger. This was unusual, as many of the Lancashire mill owners were nonconformist and radical in their outlook. In 1790 he was elected Member of Parliament for Tamworth, having bought the borough along with Lord Bath's estate in the area, and carried these principles into political life. He made Drayton Manor in Staffordshire his principal residence and started to adopt the lifestyle of a country gentleman. In 1800 he was created a Baronet, of Drayton Manor in the County of Stafford and of Bury in the County Palatine of Lancaster.

Concerned at the working conditions for children in the cotton industry, and even more concerned that some of his mills had been run by their 'overseers' (managers) contrary to his own paternalistic intentions, in 1802, he introduced the Health and Morals of Apprentices Act which tended to limit the hours that apprentice children worked in the mills, and obliged the mill owners to provide some form of schooling. In 1815, at the urging of Robert Owen, he introduced a Bill introducing stricter limits on the hours children (whether or not apprentices) could work in textile mills; in 1819 this was passed (heavily amended, and applying only to the cotton industry) as the Cotton Mills and Factories Act. In 1817, he retired from business, the various partnerships which had operated his mills being dissolved. In the 1818 general election, Peel and his son William had been the two MPs returned by Tamworth in a contested election; in 1820 Peel left Parliament (restoring the general custom at Tamworth of returning un-contested one MP of the proprietor's choosing and one representing other local interests).

== Family ==
He cried and kissed me two or three times. He is very feeble, and his voice very faint, but he was sitting in his dressing gown in his sitting room upstairs... He is much thinner and feebler than when we were here in the autumn.

— Sir Robert Peel, 2nd Baronet, regarding the last time he saw his father alive.

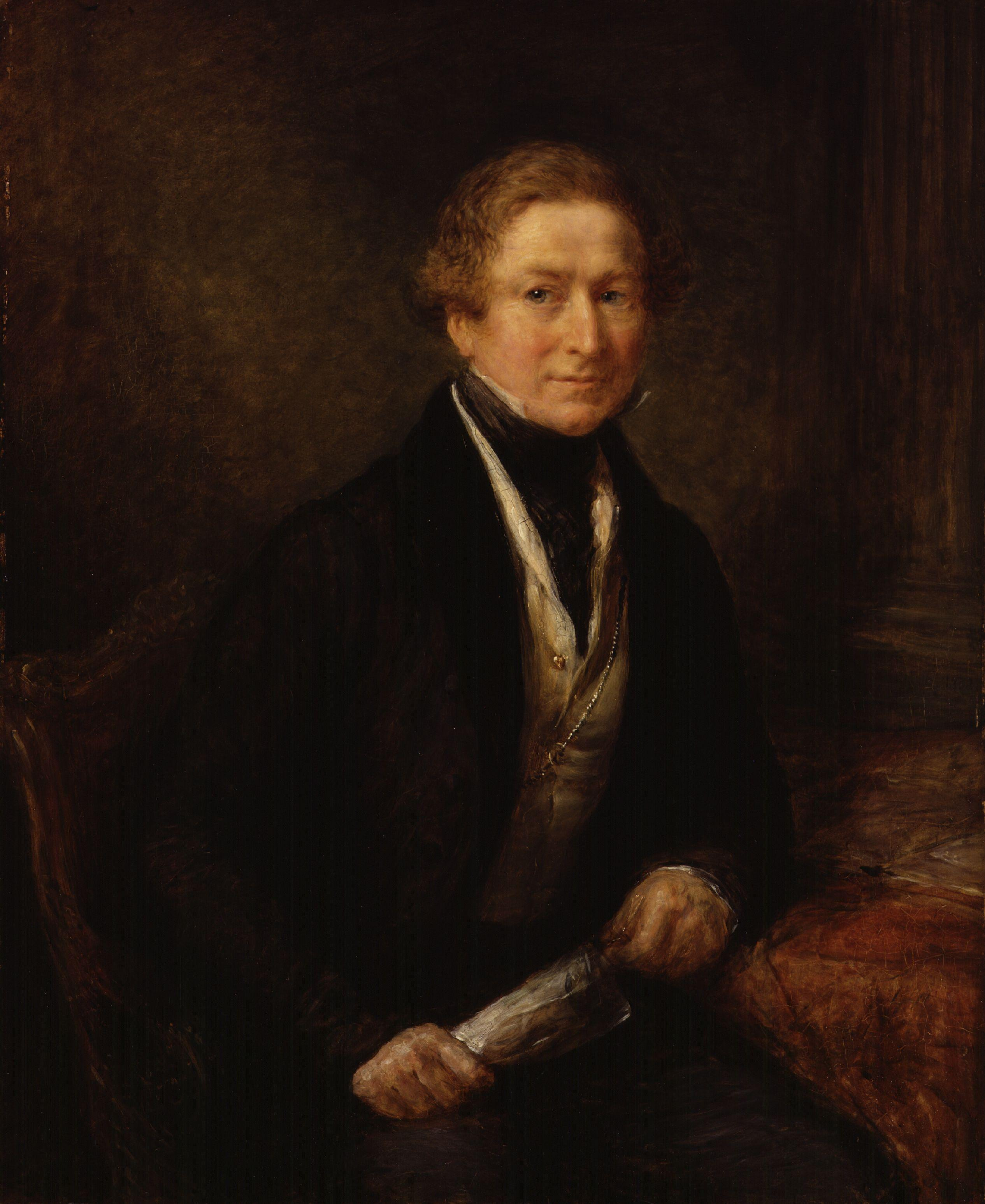
Portrait of Sir Robert Peel by John Linnell

Peel married his first wife Ellen Yates (the daughter of his partner William Yates; 1766–1803) on 8 July 1783. They had eleven children, including:

- Mary Peel (1784–1848), who married Rt Hon. George Robert Dawson; they became great-great-grandparents to James Chichester-Clark, Baron Moyola.
- Elizabeth Peel (1786–1858), who married Sir William Cockburn, 11th Baronet.
- Sir Robert Peel, 2nd Baronet (1788–1850), Prime Minister of the United Kingdom.
- William Yates Peel (1789–1858), MP and politician, married Lady Jane Elizabeth Moore, daughter of Stephen Moore, 2nd Earl Mount Cashell, and his wife Margaret King.
- Edmund Peel (1791–1850), MP and politician
- The Very Rev. John Peel (1798–1875), Dean of Worcester 1845–1874
- General Jonathan Peel (1799–1879), soldier, politician and owner of racehorses (including 'Orlando', the winner of the 'Running Rein' Derby of 1844)
- Laurence Peel (1801–1888), MP and politician, who married Lady Jane Lennox, daughter of Charles Lennox, 4th Duke of Richmond; described by one historian as "the youngest and least talented, but perhaps the most personally attractive of the Peel brothers".
- Harriet Peel (1803–1869), who married Robert Henley, 2nd Baron Henley.

Peel had high hopes for his children, especially his eldest son, Robert, who he would make repeat the substance of each Sunday's sermon after mass. Peel accepted that he would not mingle with high society, but intended to prepare his son to be able to.

In 1799 he (or his immediate family benefit trust) was estimated the seventh-wealthiest small family unit in Britain, owning £1.5M (equivalent to £286,400,000 in 2025). He was one of ten known British millionaires in 1799. The same year, on 26 April 1799 he was elected to membership of the Manchester Literary and Philosophical Society on 26 April 1799.

After the death of his first wife, Peel married Susanna Clerke (sister of Sir William Clerke) on 18 October 1805. The marriage was unsuccessful and the couple eventually separated, with Susanna moving to Warwickshire. She died on 10 September 1824. Sir Robert was at the time unwell and his children represented him at the funeral.

In April 1830, Sir Robert was growing frail, though he still played whist until he was too weak to deal. He was too proud to allow his nephew to deal for him, so stopped playing. Peel died in his armchair, peacefully and without anyone noticing until hours later.

In a biography of his son Robert, by Douglas Hurd, it states Peel had "a good life, well sustained by family pleasures, worldly success, orthodox Christian faith and a strong practical mind". His funeral was attended by the entire "corporation of Tamworth" and sixty tenants on horseback.

His will was a paradigm of primogeniture. He in most notable legacies left what transpired to be about £38,500 each to four of his sons, leaving Robert with all his land plus four times that sum; he had given already Robert £330,000 during his lifetime and willed him a further £154,000.

== Notes ==
Parliament of Great Britain
Preceded by John Courtenay; John Calvert	Member of Parliament for Tamworth; 1790–1800; With: John Courtenay 1790–1796; Thomas Carter from 1796	Succeeded by Parliament of the United Kingdom
Parliament of the United Kingdom
Preceded by Parliament of Great Britain	Member of Parliament for Tamworth; 1801–1820; With: Thomas Carter 1801–1802; William Loftus 1802–1812; Lord Charles Townshend 1812–1818; William Yates Peel 1818–1820	Succeeded by William Yates Peel; Lord Charles Townshend
Baronetage of Great Britain
New creation	Baronet of Drayton Manor and Bury; 1800–1830	Succeeded by Robert Peel
