= Boyd Hilton =

20th and 21st-century British historian

- Born: Andrew John Boyd Hilton; 19 January 1944 (age 82)

Academic work
- Main interests: British history from the mid-18th century to the mid-19th century
- Notable works: A Mad, Bad, and Dangerous People? England 1783–1846

Andrew John Boyd Hilton, FBA (born 1944) is a British historian and a professor and fellow of Trinity College, Cambridge. He specialises in modern British history, from the mid-18th century to the mid-19th century.

Hilton was educated at William Hulme's Grammar School, Manchester, and New College, Oxford, where he obtained a first class honours degree in Modern History. From 1969 to 1974, he was a research lecturer at Christ Church, Oxford. He was elected a fellow of Trinity College in 1974.

In 2007, Hilton was promoted by Cambridge to an ad hominem professorship and—"partly on the strength of his widely acclaimed ... volume in the New Oxford History of England"—a Fellow of the British Academy.

== A Mad, Bad, and Dangerous People? ==
A Mad, Bad, and Dangerous People? England 1783–1846, published in 2006, is part of the New Oxford History of England. In a 2006 review, Tristram Hunt (a former undergraduate of Hilton's college) called it a "lively and wide-ranging study that is mercifully free of dry chronology" and a "comprehensive, intriguing and challenging volume"; he notes it includes "studies of Pitt, Fox, Liverpool and Canning" as well as "accounts of phrenology, mesmerism and even early 19th-century flagellatory literature" and a "welcome concentration on economic and business matters".

== Bibliography ==
- Corn, Cash, Commerce: The Economic Policies of the Tory Governments, 1815–1830 (1978) ISBN 0-19-821864-8
- The Age of Atonement: The Influence of Evangelicalism on Social and Economic Thought, ca. 1795–1865 (1988) Oxford University Press ISBN 0-19-820107-9
- A Mad, Bad, and Dangerous People? England 1783–1846 (2006) Oxford University Press ISBN 0-19-822830-9
