= List of political families in the United Kingdom =

During its history, the United Kingdom (and previously the Kingdom of England, Kingdom of Scotland and Kingdom of Ireland) has seen many families who have repeatedly produced notable politicians, and consequently such families have had a significant impact on the politics of the United Kingdom (and in some cases, the politics of the Republic of Ireland).

Certain families, such as the Cecils, owe their long-standing political influence to the composition and role of the House of Lords, which was still mainly composed of hereditary legislators until the passing of the House of Lords Act 1999. Other families, such as the Longs, have had a long tradition of standing for elected office, usually in the House of Commons. Many such families were part of the landed gentry, who often exerted political control in a certain locality over many generations.

== (Dyke-)Aclands ==
- Sir Thomas Dyke Acland, 11th Baronet, MP 1837–86
  - Sir Thomas Dyke Acland, 12th Baronet, MP 1882–92. Elder Son of 11th baronet.
  - Sir Arthur Dyke Acland, 13th Baronet, MP 1885–99. Younger Son of 11th baronet.
    - Sir Francis Dyke Acland, 14th Baronet, MP 1906–39
      - Richard Acland, MP 1935–55.

== Adamses ==
- Allen Adams MP
  - Irene Adams MP and life peer. Spouse of the above.

== Adamsons ==
- William Adamson, MP 1910–31
  - William Murdoch Adamson, MP 1922–45.

== Aitkens ==
- William Maxwell Aitken (1879–1964), MP 1910–1916, later 1st Baron Beaverbrook
  - Max Aitken, Conservative MP 1945–1950, later 2nd Baron Beaverbrook; son of Lord Beaverbrook
  - William Traven Aitken (1903–1963), Conservative MP 1950–1963; nephew of Lord Beaverbrook
    - Jonathan Aitken (born 1942), Conservative MP 1974–1997, Chief Secretary to the Treasury; son of William Traven Aitken

== Alderdices ==
- John Alderdice, Baron Alderdice (born 1955), leader of the Alliance Party
- David Alderdice, Lord Mayor of Belfast. Brother of the above.

== Alexanders ==
- Wendy Alexander (born 1963), MSP for Paisley North since 1999, Minister in the Scottish Executive 1999–2002, Shadow Finance Secretary 2007
- Douglas Alexander (born 1967), Labour MP for Paisley and Renfrewshire South. Brother of the above.

== Atkins ==
- Robert Atkins, Conservative MP 1979–1997 and MEP 1999–2014
  - Victoria Atkins, Conservative MP 2015–. Daughter of Robert.

== Attlees ==
- Clement Attlee, Labour Prime Minister
  - John Attlee, 3rd Earl Attlee, accepted hereditary peer; grandson of Clement

== Amerys ==
- Leo Amery (1873–1955), Conservative MP for Birmingham Sparkbrook 1911–1945, Secretary of State
  - Julian Amery (1919–1996), Conservative MP for Preston North 1950–1966, Brighton Pavilion 1969–1992, Secretary of State for Air; son of Leo; also son-in-law of Harold Macmillan (see below)

== Armstrongs ==
- Ernest Armstrong (1915–96) Labour politician
  - Hilary Armstrong (born 1945) succeeded her father as MP for North West Durham in 1987, retaining the seat until 2010 when she retired.

== Asghars ==
- Mohammad (Oscar) Asghar (1945–2020), Conservative Member of the Senedd for South Wales East
- Natasha Asghar, Conservative Member of the Senedd for South Wales East; Mohammad's daughter

== Astors ==
- Waldorf Astor (1879–1952), Conservative MP for Plymouth, Sutton 1910–1919, later 2nd Viscount Astor; husband of Nancy Astor, Viscountess Astor
- Nancy Astor (1879–1964), Conservative MP for Plymouth, Sutton 1919–1945, first female MP to take her seat; Waldorf's wife
  - William Astor (1907–1966), Conservative MP for East Fulham 1935–1945, Wycombe 1951–1952; Waldorf and Nancy's son
    - William Astor (born 1951), excepted hereditary peer; William's son
      - David Cameron (born 1966), Conservative Prime Minister; stepson-in-law of William Waldorf
  - Michael Astor (1916–1979), Conservative MP for Surrey East 1945–1951; Waldorf and Nancy's son
  - Jakie Astor (1918–2000), Conservative MP for Plymouth Sutton 1951–1959; Waldorf and Nancy's son
- John Jacob Astor (1886–1971), Conservative MP for Dover 1922–1945, later 1st Baron Astor of Hever; Waldorf's brother
  - John Astor (1923–1987), Conservative MP for Newbury 1964–1974; John Jacob's son
    - John Jacob Astor (born 1946), excepted hereditary peer; John Jacob's grandson

== Asquiths ==
- H. H. Asquith (1852–1928), Liberal MP, Chancellor of the Exchequer 1905–1908, Prime Minister 1908–1916, later 1st Earl of Oxford and Asquith
  - Raymond Asquith, 3rd Earl of Oxford and Asquith (born 1952), excepted hereditary peer; great-grandson of H. H. Asquith.
  - Violet Bonham Carter (1887–1969), daughter of H. H. Asquith. (see Bonham Carters)

== Bagshaws ==
- John Bagshaw, MP 1835–59
  - Robert John Bagshaw, MP 1857–59. Son of John.

== Bakers ==
- Richard Baker MSP
  - Claire Baker MSP. Spouse of Richard

== Baldwins ==
- Alfred Baldwin (politician) (1841–1908), MP for Bewdley 1892–1908 (Conservative).
  - Stanley Baldwin (1867–1947), MP for Bewdley 1908–1937 (Conservative), Prime Minister. Son of Alfred.
    - Oliver Baldwin, 2nd Earl Baldwin of Bewdley, MP for Dudley 1929–1931, Paisley 1945–1947 (Labour). Son of Stanley.

== Bankeses ==
- Henry Bankes, MP 1801–31
  - William John Bankes, MP 1810–34. Son of Henry.
  - George Bankes, MP 1816–56. Son of Henry.

== Barings ==
- Alexander Baring, 1st Baron Ashburton, MP 1806–35 and peer.
  - Bingham Baring, 2nd Baron Ashburton, MP 1826–48 and peer.
  - Francis Baring, 3rd Baron Ashburton, MP 1830–57 and peer.

== Basses ==
- Michael Thomas Bass, MP 1848–83
  - Michael Bass, 1st Baron Burton, MP 1865–86. Son of Michael.
  - Hamar Alfred Bass, MP 1878–98. Son of Michael.

== Bathursts ==
- Seymour Bathurst, 7th Earl Bathurst, peer.
  - Allen Bathurst, Lord Apsley MP
  - Violet Bathurst MP. Spouse of Allen
    - Henry Bathurst, 8th Earl Bathurst, peer. Son of Allen and Violet.

== Beaumonts ==
- Colonel Thomas Richard Beaumont (1758–1829), soldier, Tory MP for Northumberland, 1795–1818
  - Thomas Wentworth Beaumont (1792–1848), soldier, son of Thomas Richard Beaumont, Tory MP for Northumberland 1816–1826, Whig MP for Stafford, 1826–1830, Liberal MP for Northumberland, 1830–1832, and for South Northumberland, 1832–1837
    - Wentworth Beaumont, 1st Baron Allendale (1829–1907), eldest son of Thomas Wentworth Beaumont, industrialist, Liberal MP for South Northumberland, 1852–1885, and for Tyneside, 1886–1892
      - Wentworth Beaumont, 1st Viscount Allendale (1860–1923), eldest son of Wentworth Beaumont (1st Baron Allendale), politician, Liberal MP for Hexham, 1895–1907
        - Ralph Beaumont (1901–1977) second son of Wentworth Beaumont (1st Viscount Beaumont), soldier, Conservative MP for Portsmouth Central, 1931–1945
      - Hubert Beaumont (1864–1922), third son of Wentworth Beaumont (1st Baron Allendale), Liberal MP for Eastbourne, 1906–1910
        - Michael Beaumont (1903–1958), soldier, son of Hubert Beaumont and son-in-law of Joseph Albert Pease (below), Conservative MP for Aylesbury, 1929–1938
          - Timothy Beaumont, Baron Beaumont of Whitley (1928–2008), clergyman, publisher and politician, son of Michael Beaumont and grandson of Joseph Albert Pease (below), Liberal, Liberal Democrat and from 1999 Green Party member of the House of Lords 1967–2008
    - Somerset Beaumont (1835–1921), third son of Thomas Wentworth Beaumont, banker, Liberal MP for Newcastle upon Tyne, 1860–1865, and for Wakefield, 1868–1874

== Beckfords ==
- Beckford family

== Beggses ==
- Roy Beggs, former MP for East Antrim
  - Roy Beggs Jnr., Member of the Legislative Assembly for East Antrim; his son

== Beith ==
- Alan Beith, MP for Berwick-upon-Tweed 1973–2015
- Diana Maddock, MP for Christchurch 1993–1997. Spouse of Alan.

== Benns ==
- Sir John Benn, 1st Baronet (1850–1922), Liberal MP.
  - Sir Ernest John Pickstone Benn, 2nd Baronet, first son of John, High Sheriff of the County of London 1932–1933
  - William Wedgwood Benn, 1st Viscount Stansgate (1877–1960), Liberal and Labour MP, and later peer. Son of John.
    - Daniel Holmes (1863–1955), Liberal MP 1911–1918. Father-in-law of William.
    - Tony Benn, disclaimed 2nd Viscount Stansgate (1925–2014), Labour MP for Bristol South East 1950–1960; 1963–1983 and Chesterfield 1984–2001. Son of William.
      - Stephen Benn, 3rd Viscount Stansgate, Member of the Inner London Education Authority 1986–1990. First son of Tony.
        - Emily Benn (born 1989), Labour Westminster candidate for East Worthing and Shoreham in 2010 and for Croydon South in 2015; Croydon London Borough Councillor 2014–2016. Daughter of Stephen.
      - Hilary Benn (born 1953), Labour MP for Leeds Central. Second son of Tony.

== Benyons ==
- Sir Henry Benyon, 1st Bt (1884–1959), High Sheriff of Berkshire 1925, Lord Lieutenant of Berkshire 1945–1959, Berkshire County Councillor.
  - Bill Benyon (1930–2014), MP 1970–1992. Henry's second cousin, who inherited Englefield House from him upon his death, was Bill's father.
    - Richard Benyon (born 1960), MP 2005–2019. Son of Bill.

== Beresfords ==
- John Beresford, MP 1801–05
  - John Claudius Beresford, MP 1801–11. Son of John.

== Bernal(-Osborne) ==
- Ralph Bernal, MP 1818–52
  - Ralph Bernal Osborne, MP 1841–74. Son of Ralph.

== Bevan and Lee ==
- Aneurin Bevan, MP for Ebbw Vale 1929–1960
- Jennie Lee, MP for North Lanarkshire 1929–1931 and Cannock 1945–1970. Spouse of Aneurin.

== Billinghams and Skinners ==
- Angela Billingham, Baroness Billingham, Labour life peer
  - Dennis Skinner, Labour MP; father-in-law of Angela's daughter

== Bilsons ==
- Sir Thomas Bilson (1592 – c. 1647), MP for Winchester 1614.
  - Leonard Bilson (1616–1695), MP for Petersfield 1667–1681. Son of Sir Thomas.
    - Thomas Bilson (1655–1692), MP for Petersfield 1685–1690. Son of Leonard.
      - Leonard Bilson (1681–1715), MP for Petersfield 1704–1715 Son of Thomas.

== Blackburnes ==
- John Blackburne (1754–1833), MP 1801–31
  - John Ireland Blackburne (1783–1874), MP 1807–47. Son of John.

== Blakes ==
- Judith Blake, Baroness Blake of Leeds, Labour Life Peer, 2021–present.
  - Olivia Blake, Labour MP, 2019–present. Daughter of Judith.

== Blennerhassetts ==
- John de Blennerhassett (1350–1384), MP for Carlisle (1381 and 1384)
- John Blennerhassett (died 1573), MP for Norwich (1563 and 1671) and Horsham (1558)
  - Thomas Blennerhassett (1584–1611), MP for Carlisle (1584, 1586 and 1604)
    - Sir John Blennerhassett (died 1624), Chief Baron of the Irish Exchequer (1621) and MP for Belfast
- John Blennerhassett (died 1677), High Sheriff of Kerry (1658), MP for Tralee (1661)
  - John Blennerhassett (died 1709), MP for Tralee (1692), Dingle (1695–1699) and Kerry (1703–1709), son of the above
    - John Blennerhassett (1691–1775), MP for Kerry (1709–1713, 1715–1727 and 1760–1775) and Tralee (1713–1715 and 1727–1760), son of the above
      - Arthur Blennerhassett (1719–1799), MP for Tralee (1743–1761) and Kerry (1775–1783), son of the above
      - John Blennerhassett (1715–1763), High Sheriff of Kerry (1740) and MP for Kerry (1751–1761 and 1762–1763)
  - Robert Blennerhassett (1652–1712), MP for Clonmel (1692 and 1695) and Limerick (1703)
    - Arthur Blennerhassett (1687–1758), MP for Tralee (1727–1758), son of the above
- Robert Blennerhassett (died 1689), MP for Tralee (1674), High Sheriff of Kerry (1682)
  - Conway Blennerhassett (1693–1724), MP for Tralee (1723–1725), grandson of the above
    - Sir Rowland Blennerhassett, 4th Baronet (1839–1909), Liberal MP for Galway Borough (1865–1874) and Kerry (1880–1885), great-great-great-nephew of the above.
- John Blennerhassett (1769–1794), MP for Kerry (1790–1794)
  - Arthur Blennerhassett (1799–1843), High Sheriff of Kerry (1821) and MP for Kerry (1837–1841)
    - Rowland Ponsonby Blennerhassett (1850–1913), MP for Kerry (1872–1885), grandson of the above
- John Blennerhassett (1930–2013), Fine Gael member of the Seanad Éireann (1973–1982)

== Blomfield and McAvan ==
- Paul Blomfield MP
  - Linda McAvan MEP

== Boles ==
- Sir Dennis Boles, 1st Baronet (1861–1935), MP 1911–1921.
  - Dennis Boles (1885–1958), MP 1939–1951. Nephew of Dennis.
    - Jack Boles (1925–2013), High Sheriff of Devon 1993–1994.
      - Nick Boles (1965–), MP 2010–2019. Son of Jack and great-nephew of Dennis.

== Borwicks ==
- Robert Borwick, 1st Baron Borwick, peer
  - Jamie Borwick, 5th Baron Borwick, excepted peer. Great-grandson of Robert.
    - Victoria Borwick MP and Deputy Mayor of London. Spouse of Jamie.

== Boswells ==
- Tim Boswell (1942–), Conservative MP 1987–2010.
  - Victoria Prentis (1971–), Conservative MP 2015–. Daughter of Tim.

== Bottomleys ==
- Richard Robinson, Chairman of London County Council.
  - James Bottomley, British Ambassador to South Africa 1973–1976. Grandson of Richard.
    - Peter Bottomley (1944–), MP for Woolwich West 1975–83, Eltham 1983–97, and Worthing West 1997–. Son of James.
    - Virginia Bottomley, Baroness Bottomley of Nettlestone (1948–), South West Surrey 1984–2005 and life peer. Spouse of Peter. Daughter of Barbara Garnett (Conservative member of ILEA) and niece of Peggy Jay (Labour member of GLC) and Douglas Jay MP.
      - Kitty Ussher (1971–), MP 1971–. Granddaughter of James, niece of Peter.

== Bowaters and related persons ==
- Frank Bowater, Lord Mayor of London
  - David Howell, Baron Howell of Guildford, Conservative politician, grandson of Frank
    - George Osborne, Conservative politician, son-in-law of David
  - Euan Wallace, Conservative MP, grandfather-in-law of David.

== Bradshaws ==
- Robert Haldane Bradshaw, MP 1802–32
  - James Bradshaw, MP 1825–32

== Brights and Cashs ==
- John Bright (1811–1889), MP 1843–1847 1857–1889.
  - John Albert Bright (1848–1924), MP 1889–1895 1906–1910.
  - William Leatham Bright (1851–1910), MP 1885–1890. Son of the above.
  - Bill Cash (1940–), MP 1984–. Cousin of John Bright.
- Jacob Bright (1821–1899), MP 1867–1874 1876–1885 1886–1895. Brother of John.

== Bromleys ==
- George Bromley (politician) (c. 1526–1589), MP 1558, 1559, 1563–1567, 1571, 1572.
  - Francis Bromley (c. 1556–1591), MP 1584–1585. Son of George.
  - Edward Bromley (1563–1626), MP 1586–1610. Son of George.
- Thomas Bromley (1530–1587), MP 1558, 1559, 1563–1567, Solicitor General, Lord Chancellor. Brother of George.
  - Henry Bromley (died 1615) (1560–1615), MP 1584–1588, 1593, 1597, 1604–1611. Son of Thomas.
    - Thomas Bromley (died 1641) (1585–1641), MP 1614, 1628–1629. Son of Henry (died 1615)
        - Henry Bromley (died 1670) (1632–1720), MP 1660. Grandson of Thomas (died 1641)
          - William Bromley (of Holt Castle) (1656–1707), MP 1685–1700, 1701–1702, 1705–1707. Son of Henry (died 1670).

=== Bromleys (Barons Montfort) ===
- John Bromley (the elder) (c. 1652–1707), MP 1705–1707
  - John Bromley (the younger) (c. 1682–1718), MP 1707–1718. Son of John (the elder), son-in-law of William Bromley (of Holt Castle).
    - Henry Bromley, 1st Baron Montfort (1705–1755), MP 1727–1741, Baron Montfort 1741. Son of John (the younger).
      - Thomas Bromley, 2nd Baron Montfort (1733–1799), MP 1754–1755. Son of 1st Baron.

=== Bromleys (Speaker) ===
- William Bromley (Speaker) (1663–1732), MP 1690–1698, 1701–1732, Speaker of the House of Commons.
  - Clobery Bromley (1685–1711), MP for Coventry 1710–1711. Son of William (Speaker), son-in-law of William Bromley (of Holt Castle).
  - William Bromley (died 1737) (c. 1699–1737), MP 1725–1735, 1737. Son of William (Speaker).
    - William Throckmorton Bromley (c. 1726–1769), MP for Warwickshire 1765–1769. Son of William (died 1737).

== Brookes ==
- Henry Brooke, Member of Parliament and Home Secretary, later life peer
  - Peter Brooke, MP and Secretary of State, life peer, son of Henry Brooke

== Brunners ==
- Sir John Brunner, 1st Baronet, MP 1885–1910
  - Sir John Brunner, 2nd Baronet, MP 1906–24. Son of John.

== Bull ==
- Sir William Bull, 1st Baronet, MP
  - Anthony Bull (1908–2004), Vice-chairman of London Transport (1965–1971). Son of William
    - Robin Chichester-Clark, son-in-law (see Chichester-Clark)

== Burgon ==
- Colin Burgon, MP 1997–2010.
  - Richard Burgon, MP 2015–. Nephew of Colin.

== Byers and Nandy ==
- Charles Cecil Byers (1888–1957), 1935 Liberal candidate for Westbury.
  - Frank Byers, Baron Byers (1915–1984), MP 1945–1950 and life peer. Son of Charles.
    - Dipak Nandy (1936–), deputy director of the Equal Opportunities Commission 1976–1986.
      - Lisa Nandy, MP . Son of Dipak and granddaughter of Frank.

== Calcrafts ==
- John Calcraft, MP 1801–31
  - John Hales Calcraft, MP 1820–59. Son of John.

== Callaghans ==
- James Callaghan (later Baron Callaghan of Cardiff, Prime Minister 1976–1979)
  - Margaret Jay, Baroness Jay of Paddington, life peer. Daughter of James.
  - Julian Hunt, Baron Hunt of Chesterton, nephew of Peggy, Labour life peer
    - Tristram Hunt, son of Julian, Labour MP.

== Calverts ==
- John Calvert (1726–1804), MP 1801–02
  - John Calvert (died 1844), MP 1801–31. Son of John.

== (Bonham-)Carters ==
- John Carter, Mayor of Portsmouth.
  - John Bonham-Carter (1788–1838), MP. Son of John.
    - Maurice Bonham Carter (1880–1960), Principal Private Secretary to H. H. Asquith. Grandson of John.
    - Violet Bonham Carter (1887–1969), President of the Liberal Party 1945–1947 and life peer. Spouse of Maurice.
      - Mark Bonham Carter (1922–1994), Liberal MP and life peer. Son of Violet.
        - Jane Bonham Carter (born 1957), Life peer since 2005. Daughter of Mark.
      - Laura Bonham Carter, daughter of Violet Bonham Carter and married to Jo Grimond (1913–1983), MP for Orkney and Shetland 1950–1983, Leader of the Liberal Party 1956–1967 and created life peer (1983)

== Cavendishes (Duke of Devonshire) ==
- John Cavendish (before 1340–1381), Lord Chief Justice.
  - William Cavendish (1505–1557), MP. Descendant of John.
    - William Cavendish, 1st Earl of Devonshire (1552–1626), peer and MP. Son of William.
      - William Cavendish, 2nd Earl of Devonshire (1590–1628), peer and MP. Son of William.
        - William Cavendish, 3rd Earl of Devonshire (1617–1684), peer. Son of William.
          - William Cavendish, 1st Duke of Devonshire (1640–1707), Whig MP for Derbyshire 1661–1681, peer. Son of William.
            - William Cavendish, 2nd Duke of Devonshire (1672–1729), MP for Derbyshire 1695–1701, Castle Rising 1702 and Yorkshire 1702–1707, peer. Son of 1st Duke.
              - William Cavendish, 3rd Duke of Devonshire (1698–1755), Whig MP for Lostwithiel 1721–1724, Grampound 1724–1727 and Huntingdonshire 1727–1729, peer. Son of 2nd Duke.
                - William Cavendish, 4th Duke of Devonshire (1720–1764), Whig MP for Derbyshire 1741–51, peer, First Lord of the Treasury. Son of 3rd Duke.
                  - William Cavendish, 5th Duke of Devonshire (1744–1811), peer. Son of 4th Duke.
                    - Georgiana, Duchess of Devonshire (1757–1806), spouse of William Cavendish, 5th Duke of Devonshire, society host and key support of the Whig party
                  - George Cavendish, 1st Earl of Burlington (1754–1834), MP 1775–1831. Third son of William (4th duke)
                    - William Cavendish (1783–1812), MP 1804–1812. Son of George.
                      - Lord George Cavendish, MP for North Derbyshire 1834–1880. Son of William.
                        - William Cavendish, 7th Duke of Devonshire (1808–1891), MP for Cambridge 1829–1831, Malton 1831–1832 and Derbyshire North 1832–1834, later 7th Duke of Devonshire. Son of George.
                          - Spencer Cavendish, 8th Duke of Devonshire (1833–1908), Liberal then Liberal Unionist MP for Lancashire North 1857–1868, Radnor 1869–1880, Lancashire Northeast 1880–1885 and Rossendale 1885–1891, later 8th Duke of Devonshire, asked three times to be prime minister. Son of 7th Duke.
                          - Lord Frederick Cavendish (1836–1882), Liberal MP for the West Riding of Yorkshire and Chief Secretary for Ireland. Son of 7th Duke.
                          - Lord Edward Cavendish (1838–1891), MP for Derbyshire West. Son of 7th Duke.
                            - Victor Cavendish (1868–1938), Liberal Unionist MP for Derbyshire West 1891–1908, later 9th Duke of Devonshire. Son of Edward.
                              - Edward Cavendish (1895–1950), MP for Derbyshire West 1923–1938, later 10th Duke of Devonshire. Son of 9th Duke.
                                - Andrew Cavendish (1920–2004), 11th Duke of Devonshire, minister in Conservative government 1960–64. Son of 10th Duke.
                                  - William Cavendish, Earl of Burlington (born 1969), High Sheriff of Derbyshire (2019–2020). Grandson of 11th Duke (his father the 12th Duke has not been elected representative peer).
                                  - Alastair Morrison, 3rd Baron Margadale (born 1958), Deputy Lieutenant for Wiltshire (2003) Son-in-law of 10th Duke.
                              - Harold Macmillan (1894–1986), son-in-law (see Macmillan section)
                            - Richard Cavendish (1871–1946), MP for North Lancashire; son of Edward, brother of Victor
                              - Hugh Cavendish, Baron Cavendish of Furness, life peer; grandson of Richard
                    - George Henry Compton Cavendish (1784–1809), MP for Aylesbury 1806–1809. Son of George
                    - Henry Frederick Compton Cavendish (1789–1873), MP for Derby 1812–1834. Son of George.
                      - John Campbell, 2nd Earl Cawdor, MP. Son-in-law of Henry.
                    - Charles Cavendish, 1st Baron Chesham (1793–1863), MP 1814–1857. Son of George.
                    - Lord Charles FitzRoy. MP 1818–1830 1831–1847. Son-in-law of George.
                  - William Cavendish-Bentinck, 3rd Duke of Portland, Whig MP for Weobley 1761–62, later 3rd Duke of Portland and First Lord of the Treasury; son-in-law of 4th Duke

== Cawleys ==
- Frederick Cawley, 1st Baron Cawley, MP 1895–1918 and peer
  - Harold Thomas Cawley, MP 1910–15. Son of the above.

== Cecils (Earls/Marquesses of Salisbury) ==
- William Cecil, 1st Baron Burghley chief minister of Elizabeth I of England
  - Robert Cecil, 1st Earl of Salisbury chief minister of Elizabeth I of England and James I; son of William
    - James Cecil, 3rd Earl of Salisbury politician, descendant
      - James Gascoyne-Cecil, 2nd Marquess of Salisbury, politician, Conservative Leader of the House of Lords; descendant
        - Robert Gascoyne-Cecil, 3rd Marquess of Salisbury Prime Minister Conservative Leader of the House of Lords; son of James
          - James Gascoyne-Cecil, 4th Marquess of Salisbury, politician, Conservative Leader of the House of Lords; son of Robert
            - Robert Gascoyne-Cecil, 5th Marquess of Salisbury, politician, Conservative Leader of the House of Lords; son of James
              - Robert Gascoyne-Cecil, 6th Marquess of Salisbury, politician; son of Robert
                - Robert Gascoyne-Cecil, 7th Marquess of Salisbury, politician, Conservative Leader of the House of Lords; son of Robert.
          - Robert Gascoyne-Cecil, 1st Viscount Cecil of Chelwood, politician, son of Robert.
          - Lord Hugh Cecil, politician, son of Robert.
          - Victor Alexander Gascoyne-Cecil, High Sheriff of Essex 1949. Grandson of Robert through William.
            - Bill Benyon, politician. Nephew of Victor. (see Benyons)
          - Arthur Balfour, Prime Minister, nephew of Robert
          - Gerald Balfour, 2nd Earl of Balfour, Cabinet minister, nephew of Robert

== Chamberlains and related ==
- Joseph Chamberlain, politician
  - Sir Austen Chamberlain, politician; son of Joseph
  - Neville Chamberlain, Prime Minister; son of Joseph
  - Anna Spicer, 1964 Liberal Party candidate for Hertford. She married a great-nephew of Joseph, John B. Harman.
  - Harriet Harman (1950–), MP for Peckham 1982–1997 and Camberwell and Peckham 1997–. Great-great-niece of Joseph
    - Jack Dromey (1948–2022), MP for Birmingham Erdington 2010–. Husband of Harriet
- Richard Chamberlain, brother of Joseph

== Chichesters (Baron Fisherwick) ==
- Arthur Chichester, 1st Marquess of Donegall and 1st Baron Fisherwick (1739–1799), MP for Malmesbury, House of Lords peer
  - George Chichester, 2nd Marquess of Donegall and 2nd Baron Fisherwick (1769–1844), House of Lords peer. Son of Arthur.
    - George Hamilton Chichester, 3rd Marquess of Donegall, 1st Baron Ennishowen and Carrickfergus, and 3rd Baron Fisherwick (1797–1883), House of Lords peer. Elder son of George.
    - Edward Chichester, 4th Marquess of Donegall (1799–1889) and 4th Baron Fisherwick, House of Lords peer. Younger son of George.
      - George Augustus Hamilton Chichester, 5th Marquess of Donegall and 5th Baron Fisherwick (1822–1904), House of Lords peer. Elder son of Edward.
        - Edward Chichester, 6th Marquess of Donegall and 6th Baron Fisherwick (1903–1975), House of Lords peer. Elder son of George.
      - Adolphus John Spencer Churchill Chichester (1836–1901), High Sheriff of County Londonderry 1882. Younger son of Edward.
        - Robert Chichester for South Londonderry 1921–1922.
          - Dehra Parker, MP for Londonderry 1921–1929 and South Londonderry 1933–1960. Spouse of Robert.
          - Two of Robert and Dehra's children can be found in the Chichester-Clark section.
      - Washington Shirley, 9th Earl Ferrers (1822–1859), House of Lords peer. Father-in-law of Edward.
  - Arthur Chichester, 1st Baron Templemore (1797–1837), MP 1826–1830, House of Lords peer. Grandson of Arthur.
    - Harry Spencer Chichester, 2nd Baron Templemore (1821–1906), House of Lords peer. Son of Arthur.
      - Arthur Henry Chichester, 3rd Baron Templemore (1854–1924), House of Lords peer. Son of Harry.
        - Arthur Claud Spencer Chichester, 4th Baron Templemore (1880–1953), House of Lords peer and Deputy Lieutenant of Hampshire. Son of Arthur.
          - Dermot Chichester, 7th Marquess of Donegall and 5th Baron Templemore (1916–2007), House of Lords pre-1999 peer. Son of Arthur.

== Chaplins ==
- Charles Chaplin, MP 1802–16
  - Charles Chaplin, MP 1809–31. Son of Charles.

== Chapman ==
- Jenny Chapman (1973–), MP for Darlington 2010–.
  - Nick Smith (1960–), MP for Blaenau Gwent 2015–. Spouse of Jenny.

== Chichester-Clark ==
- James Johnston Clark, High Sheriff of County Londonderry 1849, MP for Londonderry 1857–1859}
  - William Ovens Clark, Chief Justice of Punjab Chief Court. Son of James.
  - James Lenox-Conyngham Chichester-Clark, Stormont MP for South Londonderry 1929–1933. Grandson of James.
    - James Chichester-Clark, Baron Moyola, son of James, grandson of Robert and Dehra, Stormont MP for South Londonderry 1960–1972 and Prime Minister of Northern Ireland 1969–1971
    - Robin Chichester-Clark, son of James, Westminster MP for Londonderry 1955–1974
- William Fitzwilliam Lenox-Conyngham, High Sheriff of Tyrone (1866). Maternal grandfather of James.
- Robert Chichester, Westminster MP for South Londonderry 1921–1922, father-in-law of James LC CC, grandfather of James and Robin
- Dehra Parker (née Kerr-Fisher, then Chichester), Stormont MP for Londonderry 1921–1929 and for South Londonderry 1933–1960, wife of Robert, mother-in-law of James LC CC, grandmother of James and Robin

== Churchills, Spencers and related persons ==
- John Churchill, 1st Duke of Marlborough, military commander and politician
  - George Spencer, 4th Duke of Marlborough, politician; descendant of John, 1st Duke
    - John Spencer-Churchill, 7th Duke of Marlborough, politician, descendant of George
      - Lord Randolph Churchill (1849–1895), MP and Leader of the House of Commons 1886–1887. Son of John
        - Winston Churchill (1874–1965), Prime Minister 1940–1945 1951–1955; Son of Lord Randolph.
          - Randolph Churchill (1911–1968), MP 1911–1968. Son of Winston.
          - Pamela Harriman (1920–1997), United States Ambassador to France (1993–1997). Spouse of Randolph.
            - Winston Churchill (1940–2010), MP 1970–1997. Son of Randolph and Pamela.
          - Christopher Soames (1920–1987), MP 1950–1966, Leader of the House of Lords 1979–1981, Governor of Southern Rhodesia 1979–1980. Son-in-law of Winston.
            - Nicholas Soames (1948–), MP 1983–2019. Son of Christopher.
          - Duncan Sandys, politician; married to Diana Churchill, daughter of Sir Winston
            - Laura Sandys, Member of Parliament; daughter of Duncan by second marriage
            - Piers Dixon, Member of Parliament; married to Edwina Sandys, daughter of Duncan
            - John Cronin, Member of Parliament; father-in-law of Piers by subsequent marriage
          - Anthony Eden, Prime Minister; married to Clarissa Churchill, niece of Sir Winston
      - Charles Spencer-Churchill, 9th Duke of Marlborough, politician, grandson of John, 7th Duke
      - Ivor Bertie Guest, 1st Baron Wimborne (1835–1914), son-in-law of John Spencer-Churchill, 7th Duke of Marlborough (see Guests)
  - Georgiana, Duchess of Devonshire, descendant of John, 1st Duke
    - Spencer Cavendish (1833–1908); son of the above (see Cavendish section)
  - George Spencer, 2nd Earl Spencer (1758–1834), Whig MP for Northampton and Surrey, Lord Privy Seal in 1794, First Lord of the Admiralty in 1794–1801 under William Pitt the Younger and Charles James Fox, Home Secretary in 1806–1807 in the Ministry of All the Talents under Lord Grenville, brother of Georgiana
    - John Spencer, 3rd Earl Spencer (1782–1845), Whig MP for Northamptonshire and South Northamptonshire, Chancellor of the Exchequer and Leader of the House of Commons in 1830–1834, son of George
    - Frederick Spencer, 4th Earl Spencer (1798–1857), Whig MP, Lord Chamberlain of the Household in 1846–1848 and Lord Steward of the Household in 1854–1857, brother of John
      - John Spencer, 5th Earl Spencer (1835–1910), Liberal MP for South Northamptonshire, Lord Lieutenant of Ireland in 1868–1874 and 1882–1885, Lord President of the Council in 1880–1883 and in 1886, First Lord of the Admiralty in 1892–1895, son of Frederick
      - Charles Spencer, 6th Earl Spencer (1857–1922), MP for North and Mid Northamptonshire, Lord Chamberlain of the Household in 1905–1912, brother of John and son of Frederick

== Clifton-Browns ==
- Sir William Brown, 1st Baronet, of Richmond Hill (1784–1864), MP 1846–1859.
  - Sir William Richmond Brown, 2nd Baronet (1840–1906), High Sheriff of Northamptonshire 1873. Son of William.
  - James Clifton Brown (1841–1917), MP 1876–1880. Brother of William.
    - Howard Clifton Brown (1868–1946), MP 1922–1923 1924–1945. Son of James.
    - Douglas Clifton Brown, 1st Viscount Ruffside (1879–1958), MP and Speaker of the House of Commons 1943–1951. Son of James.
      - Audrey Hylton-Foster, Baroness Hylton-Foster (1908–2002), life peer.
    - Edward Clifton-Brown (1870–1944), High Sheriff of Buckinghamshire 1936. Son of James.
      - Geoffrey Clifton-Brown (1899–1983), MP 1945–1950.
        - Geoffrey Clifton-Brown (1953–), MP 1992–. Grandson of Geoffrey.

== Coopers and Balls ==
- Yvette Cooper (1969–), MP for Pontefract and Castleford/Normanton, Pontefract and Castleford 1997–.
  - Ed Balls (1967–), MP for Normanton 2005–2010 and Morley and Outwood 2010–2015. Spouse of Yvette.

== Courtses ==
- A. E. Stubbs (1877–1962), MP 1945–1950.
- Robert Courts (born 1978), MP 1978–. Great-grandson of A. E. Stubbs.

== Cox and Leadbeater ==
- Jo Cox (1975–2016) MP for Batley and Spen 2015–2016.
  - Kim Leadbeater (1976– ) MP for Batley and Spen 2021-onwards. Jo Cox's Sister

== Cromwells ==
- Thomas Cromwell, 1st Earl of Essex, Secretary of State, Master of the Rolls, Lord Privy Seal
  - Oliver Cromwell (great-great-grandnephew of Thomas), army general, Lord Protector
    - Richard Cromwell (son of Oliver), member of Council of State, Lord Protector
    - Henry Ireton, son-in-law of Oliver, New Model Army general, deputy-governor of Ely, member of Parliament, Lord Deputy of Ireland
    - Charles Fleetwood, son-in-law of Oliver, New Model Army general, governor of Isle of Wight, member of Parliament, member of Council of State, Lord Deputy of Ireland

== Cruddas and Healy ==
- Jon Cruddas MP
  - Anna Healy, Baroness Healy of Primrose Hill. Spouse of Jon.

== Cryers ==
- Bob Cryer (1934–1994), MP 1974–1983 1987–1994 and MEP 1984–1989.
- Ann Cryer (1939–), MP 1997–2010. Spouse of Bob.
  - John Cryer (1964–), MP for Hornchurch 1997–2005 and Leyton and Wanstead 2010–. Son of Bob and Ann.
  - Ellie Reeves (1980–), MP for Lewisham West and Penge 2017–. Spouse of John.
  - Rachel Reeves (1979–), MP 2010–. Sister of Ellie.

== Dashwoods ==
- Sir Henry Dashwood, 3rd Baronet, MP 1801–20
  - Sir George Dashwood, 4th Baronet, MP 1814–18. Son of Henry.

== Davidsons ==
- John Davidson, MP 1920–1937
  - Frances Davidson, Viscountess Davidson MP 1937–1959. Wife of John.

== Davies and Rees ==
- Ron Davies MP and AM
  - Christina Rees MP. Spouse of the above.

== Davises ==
- Richard Hart Davis, MP 1807–31
  - Hart Davis, MP 1812–18. Son of Richard.

== Dawsons ==
- George Robert Dawson MP.
  - Robert Peel Dawson (1818–1877), MP 1859–74 and Lord Lieutenant of County Londonderry 1870–77. Son of George.
    - Robert Chichester MP. Grandson of Robert. (see Chichesters)

== Dickinsons and Davidsons ==
- Willoughby Dickinson was a Liberal MP, later 1st Baron Dickinson – his father and grandfather were also MPs
  - Frances Davidson, later Baroness Northchurch, his daughter, served as Conservative MP for Hemel Hempstead 1937 to 1959, succeeding her husband John Davidson, later Viscount Davidson

== Doddses ==
- Nigel Dodds MLA and MP
  - Diane Dodds MLA and MEP. Spouse of the above.

== Doran and Ruddock ==
- Frank Doran, MP for Aberdeen South 1987–1992, Aberdeen Central 1997–2005, and Aberdeen North 2005–2015.
  - Joan Ruddock, MP for Lewisham Deptford 1987–2015. Spouse of the above.

== Dunnes ==
- Edward Marten Dunne (1864–1944), Liberal MP 1906–1910.
  - Philip Dunne (1904–1965), Conservative MP 1935–1937. Son of Edward.
    - Thomas Dunne (1933–), Lord Lieutenant of Hereford and Worcester 1977–1998. Son of Philip.
      - Philip Dunne, Conservative MP 2005–. Son of Thomas.
    - Martin Dunne (Lord Lieutenant) (1938–), Lord Lieutenant of Warwickshire 1997–2010. Son of Philip.

== Dunwoodys ==
- Morgan Phillips (General Secretary of the Labour Party (1944–1961))
- Norah Phillips, Baroness Phillips, Labour life peer, spouse of Morgan
  - Gwyneth Dunwoody, MP for Exeter 1966–1970, Crewe 1974–1983, and Crewe and Nantwich 1983–2008. Daughter of Morgan and Norah.
  - John Dunwoody, MP for Falmouth and Camborne 1966–1970. Spouse of Gwyneth.
    - Tamsin Dunwoody, Welsh Assembly Member (2003–2007), Deputy Minister for Enterprise, Innovation and Networks (January 2005 – 2007), Deputy Minister for Environment, Planning & Countryside (October 2005 – 2007) Welsh Assembly Government, their daughter

== Durkans ==
- Mark Durkan, SDLP politician
  - Mark H. Durkan, SDLP politician, nephew of Mark

== Eagleses ==
- Angela Eagle (1961–), Labour MP.
- Maria Eagle (1961–), Labour MP. Twin sister of Angela.

== Eccleses ==
- David Eccles, 1st Viscount Eccles, Conservative politician
  - John Eccles, 2nd Viscount Eccles, Conservative excepted hereditary peer; son of David
  - Diana Eccles, Viscountess Eccles, Conservative life peeress; spouse of John.

== Edwards and Goldings ==
- Ness Edwards MP
  - Llin Golding MP. Daughter of Ness.
    - John Golding MP. Spouse of Llin.

== Egertons ==
- William Egerton, MP 1784–90, 1792–1800, 1801–1806.
  - Wilbraham Egerton, MP 1812–31
    - William Egerton, MP 1830–58.
      - Wilbraham Egerton, 1st Earl Egerton MP 1868–1883.
        - Alan de Tatton Egerton, MP 1883–1906.

== Ewings ==
- Winnie Ewing (1929–2023), SNP MP 1967–1970 1974–1979, MEP 1974–1999; MSP 1999–2003.
- Stewart Ewing (1927–2003, husband of Winnie) SNP activist and councillor for Glasgow Summerston 1977
  - Fergus Ewing (born 1957, son of Winnie), SNP MSP for Inverness East, Nairn and Lochaber 1999–present
  - Margaret Ewing (1945–2006, spouse of Fergus), SNP MP for East Dunbartonshire 1974–79 and for Moray 1987–2001; MSP for Moray 1999–2006
  - Annabelle Ewing (born 1960, daughter of Winnie), SNP MP for Perth 2001–2005; SNP MSP 2011–present.

== Ferguson and Butler ==
- Patricia Ferguson MSP
  - Bill Butler MSP. Spouse of Patricia.

== Fieldens ==
- John Fielden (1784–1849), Liberal MP for Oldham 1832–47
  - Joshua Fielden (1827–87, son of John), Conservative MP for Eastern West Riding of Yorkshire 1868–80
    - Thomas Fielden (1854–97, son of Joshua), Conservative MP for Middleton 1886–92 and 1895–97
    - Edward Brocklehurst Fielden (1857–1942, brother of Thomas), Conservative MP for Middleton 1900–06 and Manchester Exchange 1924–35; married Mary Ellen, daughter of Thomas Knowles (1824–83), MP for Wigan 1874–83

== Finnies ==
- John Finnie, Scottish Green Party MSP
  - Ruth Maguire, SNP MSP, daughter of John

== Foleys ==
- Thomas Foley (died 1677), MP 1659 1660–61 1673–77.
  - Thomas Foley (died 1701), MP 1679–85 1689–1698 1699 1701. First son of Thomas.
  - Philip Foley (1648–1716), MP 1679–85 1689–1701. Third son of Thomas.
  - Paul Foley (died 1699), Speaker of the House of Commons 1695–1698. Second son of Thomas.
    - Thomas Foley (died 1737), MP 1691–1727 1734–37. Son of Paul.
      - Thomas Foley (died 1749), MP 1734–41 1742–47. Son of Thomas.
        - Thomas Foley, 1st Baron Foley (1716–1777), MP 1741–47 1754–76 and peer. Son of Thomas.
          - Thomas Foley, 2nd Baron Foley (1742–1793), MP and peer. First son of Thomas.
          - Edward Foley (1747–1803), MP 1768–1803. Second son of Thomas.
            - Edward Thomas Foley (1791–1846), MP 1826–41. Son of Edward.
            - John Hodgetts-Foley (1797–1861), MP 1822–1835 1847–1861. Son of Edward.
              - Henry Hodgetts-Foley (1828–1894), MP 1857–68. Son of John.
                - Paul Henry Hodgetts-Foley (1857–1928), High Sheriff of Herefordshire 1906.
                  - Major Henry Thomas Hamilton Foley MBE (1905–1959), High Sheriff of Herefordshire 1947. Grandson of Henry.
                    - Sir John Foley. Son of Henry.
          - Andrew Foley (died 1818), MP 1801–18. Third son of Thomas.
            - Thomas Foley (1778–1822), MP 1805–22.

== Foots ==
- Isaac Foot, MP 1922–35.
  - Dingle Foot, MP 1931–70. Son of Isaac.
  - Hugh Foot, (later Baron Caradon, 1907–1990, Governor of Cyprus, Permanent Representative at the United Nations 1964–70), son of Isaac
    - Paul Foot (1937–2004, Socialist Workers Party/Socialist Alliance/Respect candidate), son of Hugh
  - John Foot, (later Baron Foot, 1909–1999, lawyer and Liberal politician), son of Isaac
  - Michael Foot (1913–2010), Leader of the British Labour Party (1980–1983), son of Isaac

== Fords ==
- Patricia Ford, MP for North Down 1953–55
  - Sir Michael Grylls, MP for Chertsey 1970–74 and North West Surrey 1974–97. Daughter-in-law of Patricia.

== Fosters ==
- Sam Foster, UUP MLA.
  - Arlene Foster, First Minister of Northern Ireland, niece-in-law of Sam

== Galbraiths ==
- Thomas Dunlop Galbraith, 1st Baron Strathclyde, MP 1940–65 and peer.
  - Tam Galbraith (1917–1982), MP for Glasgow Hillhead 1948–82, whip and junior minister. Son of Thomas.
    - Thomas Galbraith, 2nd Baron Strathclyde, whip and junior minister. Son of Tam.

== Garniers ==
- Edward Garnier, Conservative politician
- Mark Garnier, Conservative politician, cousin of Edward

== Gibsons of Glasgow ==
- Kenneth Gibson MSP
  - Patricia Gibson MP. Spouse of Kenneth

== Gibsons of Highlands and Islands ==
- Rob Gibson, SNP Member of Scottish Parliament 2003–
  - Eleanor Scott, Green MSP 2003–2007. Domestic partner of Rob.

== Gladstones and relations ==
- Sir John Gladstone, 1st Baronet, MP 1818–1827.
  - William Ewart Gladstone, MP 1832–95
    - Herbert Gladstone, 1st Viscount Gladstone, MP 1880–1910 and Governor-General of South Africa 1910–1914.
      - George Freeman (1967–), MP 2010–. Great-great-great-nephew of Herbert.
        - Mabel Philipson, MP 1923–1929. Great-aunt of George.
    - William Henry Gladstone, MP 1865–85. Son of William.

== Gildernews ==
- Phelim Gildernew, Mid Ulster District Councillor and Dungannon and South Tyrone Borough Council Mayor. Father of Colm and Michelle.
  - Michelle Gildernew. Daughter of Phelim.
  - Colm Gildernew. Brother of Michelle.

== Goldsmiths ==
- Frank Goldsmith (1878–1967), Conservative MP for Stowmarket.
  - Edward Goldsmith (1928–2009), co-founder of the Green Party of England and Wales. Son of Frank.
  - James Goldsmith (1933–1997), MEP for France. Son of Frank.
  - Lady Annabel Goldsmith (1934–), president of Democracy Movement. Spouse of James.
    - Zac Goldsmith, Baron Goldsmith of Richmond Park, Conservative MP for Richmond Park 2010–2016 and 2017–2019. Son of James and Annabel.

Additionally, James Goldsmith's daughter Jemima Goldsmith married Imran Khan, former prime minister of Pakistan.

== Goschens ==
- George Goschen, 1st Viscount Goschen, MP 1863–1900 and peer.
  - George Goschen, 2nd Viscount Goschen, MP 1895–1900 and peer. Son of George.

== Grady and Chichester ==
- Henry Deane Grady (1764–1847), MP for Limerick City 1798–1802.
  - Edward Chichester, 4th Marquess of Donegall (1799–1889), House of Lords peer. Son-in-law of Henry.

== Grants ==
- Charles Grant, MP 1802–18
  - Charles, jnr, MP 1811–35.

== Grattans ==
- Henry Grattan, MP 1803–20
  - James Grattan, MP 1817–29. Son of Henry.

== Greenes ==
- Sir Edward Greene, 1st Baronet, MP 1900–06
  - Sir Raymond Greene, 2nd Baronet, MP 1895–1923.

== Greenwoods ==
- Arthur Greenwood, MP 1922–54
  - Tony Greenwood, MP 1946–70. Son of Arthur.

== Grenvilles ==
- Richard Grenville, MP for Wendover 1715–1722, Buckingham 1722–1727
  - Richard Grenville-Temple, 2nd Viscount Cobham, 2nd Earl Temple, son of Richard
  - George Grenville, Prime Minister, son of Richard
  - Thomas Grenville, son of Hester
    - George Nugent-Temple-Grenville, 3rd Viscount Cobham, 1st Marquess of Buckingham, son of George
    - William Wyndham Grenville, 1st Baron Grenville, Prime Minister; son of George; also son-in-law of Thomas Pitt, 1st Baron Camelford
    - Thomas Grenville, politician, son of George
  - James Grenville, son of Richard, MP for Old Sarum 1742–1747, Bridport 1747–1754, Buckingham 1754–1768, Horsham 1768–1770
    - James Grenville, 1st Baron Glastonbury, twin son of James, MP for Thirsk 1765–1768, Buckingham 1770–1790, and Buckinghamshire 1790–1797, peer
    - Richard Grenville, twin son of James, MP for Buckingham (1774–1780)

== Greys and related persons ==
- Charles Grey, 1st Earl Grey (1729–1807), military commander
  - Charles Grey, 2nd Earl Grey (1764–1845), MP for Northumberland, Appleby and Tavistock, Foreign Secretary (1806–1807), Prime Minister (1830–1834)
    - Lady Louisa Elizabeth Grey (1797–1841), married John Lambton, 1st Earl of Durham (1792–1840), MP for Durham, Lord Privy Seal (1830–1833)
      - Frederick Lambton, 4th Earl of Durham (1855–1929), MP for South East Durham (1900–1910)
        - Lady Lilian Lambton (1881–1966), married Charles Douglas-Home, 13th Earl of Home (1873–1951), Lord Lieutenant of Berwickshire (1930–1951)
          - Alexander Frederick Douglas-Home, 14th Earl of Home, later Baron Home of the Hirsel (1903–1995), MP for Lanark (1931–1945) and (1950–1951), and for Kinross and Western Perthshire (1963–1974), Minister of State for Scotland (1951–1955), Secretary of State for Commonwealth Relations (1955–1960), Leader of the House of Lords (1957–1960), Lord President of the Council (1959–1960), Foreign Secretary (1960–1963) and (1970–1974), Prime Minister (1963–1964)
            - David Douglas-Home, 15th Earl of Home (1943–2022), excepted hereditary peer
    - Henry Grey, 3rd Earl Grey (1802–1894), MP for Sunderland (1841–1845), Secretary at War (1835–1839), Secretary of State for War and the Colonies (1846–1852)
    - Sir Charles Grey (1804–1870), MP for Wycombe (1832–1837), Private Secretary to the Sovereign (1861–1870)
      - Albert Grey, 4th Earl Grey (1851–1917), MP for South Northumberland (1880–1885), Governor General of Canada (1904–1911)
        - Mary Cecil Grey, granddaughter of the above, (1907–2002), married Evelyn Baring, 1st Baron Howick of Glendale (1903–1973), Governor of Kenya (1952–1959), British High Commissioner to South Africa (1944–1951)
    - Lady Mary Grey (1807–1884), married Charles Wood, 1st Viscount Halifax (1800–1885), MP for Halifax (1832–1865), Chancellor of the Exchequer (1846–1852), President of the Board of Control (1852–1855), First Lord of the Admiralty (1855–1858), Secretary of State for India (1859–1866), Lord Privy Seal (1870–1874)
      - E. F. L. Wood, 1st Earl of Halifax, grandson of the above, (1881–1959), MP for Ripon (1910–1925), President of the Board of Education and Minister of Agriculture and Fisheries (1922–1925), Viceroy of India (1926–1931), Lord Privy Seal and Lord President of the Council (1935–1938), Foreign Secretary (1938–1940), Leader of the House of Lords (1940), British Ambassador to the United States (1940–1946)
  - Sir George Grey, 1st Baronet (1767–1828), naval commander
    - Sir George Grey, 2nd Baronet (1799–1882), MP for Devonport, North Northumberland and Morpeth (1832–1874), Chancellor of the Duchy of Lancaster (1841) and (1859–1861), Home Secretary (1846–1852), (1855–1858) and (1861–1866), Secretary of State for the Colonies (1854–1855), Judge Advocate General (1839–1841)
      - Sir Edward Grey, grandson of the above, (1862–1933), MP for Berwick-upon-Tweed (1885–1916), Under-Secretary of State for Foreign Affairs (1892–1895), Foreign Secretary (1905–1916), British Ambassador to the United States (1919–1920)
    - Jane Grey (1804–1838), married Francis Baring, 1st Baron Northbrook (1796–1866), MP for Portsmouth (1826–1865), Chancellor of the Exchequer (1839–1841), First Lord of the Admiralty (1849–1852)
      - Thomas Baring, 1st Earl of Northbrook (1826–1904), MP for Penryn and Falmouth, Under-Secretary of State for India (1859–1861) and (1861–1864), First Lord of the Admiralty (1880–1885), Viceroy of India (1872–1876)
  - Lady Elizabeth Grey (1765–1846), married Samuel Whitbread (1764–1815), MP for Bedford

== Grieves ==
- Percy Grieve (1915–1998), MP 1964–1983.
  - Dominic Grieve (1956–), MP 1997–2019. Son of Percy.

== Guests ==
- Sir John Josiah Guest, 1st Bt (1785–1852); Welsh engineer and entrepreneur, MP for Honiton and first MP for Merthyr Tydfil
  - Ivor Bertie Guest, 1st Baron Wimborne (1835–1914); Welsh industrialist, first son of John Josiah Guest, High Sheriff of Glamorgan in 1862; mayor of Poole from 1896 to 1897; son-in-law of John Spencer-Churchill, 7th Duke of Marlborough (see Churchills)
    - Ivor Churchill Guest, 1st Viscount Wimborne (1873–1939), Conservative MP for Plymouth, he later accompanied his cousin Winston Churchill into the Liberal Party and sat as Liberal MP for Cardiff, government minister and Lord Lieutenant of Ireland, 1915–1918. Son of Ivor.
    - Henry Guest (1874–1957), Liberal and later Liberal National MP for four different constituencies between 1910 and 1945. Son of Ivor.
    - Frederick Guest (1875–1937), Coalition Liberal MP and Chief Whip in Lloyd George's Coalition Government 1916–1922. Son of Ivor.
    - Lionel George William Guest (1880–1935), elected Municipal Reform Party member of the London County Council for Mile End in 1928. Son of Ivor.
    - Oscar Guest (1888–1958), Liberal MP for Loughborough, 1918–1922 and Conservative MP for Camberwell North West, 1935–1945. Son of Ivor.
  - Montague Guest (1839–1909), Liberal MP for Youghal, County Cork and later for Wareham in Dorset. Third son of John.

== Guinness (Earl of Iveagh and Baron Moyne) and related persons ==
- Arthur Guinness, not a politician
  - Frederick Darley, son-in-law of Arthur, Lord Mayor of Dublin (1809)
  - Sir Benjamin Guinness, 1st Baronet, grandson of Arthur, Lord Mayor of Dublin (1851–1852) and MP for Dublin City (1865–1868)
    - Arthur Guinness, 1st Baron Ardilaun, son of Benjamin, MP for Dublin City (1868–1870; 1874–1880)
    - Edward Guinness, 1st Earl of Iveagh, son of Benjamin, candidate in the 1885 United Kingdom general election at Dublin St Stephen's Green
      - Rupert Guinness, 2nd Earl of Iveagh, son of the above, MP for Southend from 1918 until he succeeded his father in 1927
      - Gwendolen Guinness, Countess of Iveagh, spouse of Rupert Guinness, MP for Southend from 1927 to 1935
        - Benjamin Guinness, 3rd Earl of Iveagh, son of Rupert and Gwendolen, Member of Seanad Éireann (1972–1977)
        - Sir Henry "Chips" Channon, son-in-law of Rupert and Gwendolen Guinness, MP for Southend from 1927 to 1950 and then of Southend West, one of its successor seats, from 1950 to his death in 1958
          - Paul Channon, son of Henry Channon, MP for Southend West (1958–1997)
        - Alan Lennox-Boyd, 1st Viscount Boyd of Merton, son-in-law of Rupert and Gwendolen, MP for Mid Bedfordshire (1931–1960)
          - Mark Lennox-Boyd, younger son of the above, MP for Morecambe and Lonsdale (1979–1983) and Morecambe and Lunesdale (1983–1997)
        - Charles Wellesley, 9th Duke of Wellington, grandson-in-law of Rupert, MEP for Surrey (1979–1984) and Surrey West (1984–1989)
      - Ernest Guinness, son of 1st Earl of Iveagh, not a politician
        - Basil Hamilton-Temple-Blackwood, 4th Marquess of Dufferin and Ava, son-in-law of Arthur, Under-Secretary of State for the Colonies (1937–1940)
        - Dominick Browne, 4th Baron Oranmore and Browne, son-in-law of Arthur
      - Walter Guinness, 1st Baron Moyne, son of Edward, MP for Bury St Edmunds (1907–1931) and Leader of the House of Lords 1941–1942
        - Jonathan Guinness, 3rd Baron Moyne, grandson of Walter through Bryan Guinness, 2nd Baron Moyne, candidate in the 1973 Lincoln by-election and 1976 Coventry North West by-election
          - James Charteris, 13th Earl of Wemyss, son-in-law of Jonathan, deputy lieutenant of Gloucestershire (2005)
            - Rock Feilding-Mellen, stepson of Wemyss, Kensington and Chelsea London Borough Councillor
        - Diarmid Edward Guinness, grandson of Walter through Bryan Guinness, 2nd Baron Moyne, not a politician
          - Robert Carnwath, Lord Carnwath of Notting Hill, brother-in-law of Diarmid, life peer
        - Oswald Phipps, 4th Marquess of Normanby, son-in-law of Walter, Lord Lieutenant of the North Riding of Yorkshire (1965–1974) and North Yorkshire (1974–1987)
    - Somerset de Chair, great-great-grandson-in-law of Benjamin through his daughter Anne, MP for South West Norfolk (1935–1945) and Paddington South (1950–1951)
      - Jacob Rees-Mogg, son-in-law of Somerset, MP for North East Somerset (since 2010)
  - Richard Samuel Guinness, great-nephew of Arthur, MP for Kinsale (1847–1848)
    - Robert Rundell Guinness, nephew of Richard, not a politician
      - Loel Guinness, great-grandson of Robert through Richard, MP for Bath (1931–1945)
      - Henry Guinness, grandson of Robert through Henry, Member of Seanad Éireann (1922–1934)
        - Zac Goldsmith, 3x-great-grandnephew-in-law of Henry through his brother Howard Rundell Guinness (see Goldsmith section)
      - Henry Eustace Guinness, nephew of the above, Member of Seanad Éireann (1954–1957)

Additionally, Arthur Guinness' great-grandson of the same name (through the former's son Hosea) was a politician in a different country: Speaker of the New Zealand House of Representatives.

== Gummers ==
- John Gummer, Conservative politician
  - Ben Gummer, Conservative Member of Parliament; son of John
- Peter Gummer, life peer; brother of John

== Hampdens ==
- Griffith Hampden MP (1543–1591)
  - William Hampden MP (1570–1597)
    - John Hampden MP (1595–1643)
      - William Hampden MP (1633–1675)
      - Richard Hampden MP (1631–1695)
        - John Hampden MP (1653–1696)
        - John Hampden MP (1696–1754)

== Hankeys ==
- Joseph Hankey MP (1754–1803)
- Richard Hankey MP (1766–1817)

== Harcourts ==
- William Vernon Harcourt, MP 1868–1904
  - Lewis Harcourt, 1st Viscount Harcourt, MP 1904–17 and peer. Son of William.

== Hardies ==
- Keir Hardie, leader of the Labour Party
  - George Hardie, Labour MP; half-brother of Keir
    - Agnes Hardie, Labour MP; spouse of George
  - David Hardie, Labour MP; half-brother of Keir
  - Nan Hardie, Labour provost; daughter of Keir
    - Emrys Hughes, Labour MP; husband of Nan

== Hardings ==
- John Harding, 1st Baron Harding of Petherton, peer
  - John Harding, 2nd Baron Harding of Petherton. Son of John.
    - Dido Harding, life peer. Daughter of John.
      - John Penrose MP. Spouse of the above.

== Harpham and Furniss ==
- Harry Harpham (1954–2016), Labour MP 2015–2016.
  - Gill Furniss (1957–), Labour MP 2016–. Widow of Harry; she took over his seat upon his death)

== Heathcotes ==
- Sir Gilbert Heathcote, 4th Baronet, MP 1801–41
  - Gilbert Heathcote, 1st Baron Aveland, MP 1820–56 and peer. Son of Gilbert.
    - Gilbert Heathcote-Drummond-Willoughby, 1st Earl of Ancaster, MP 1852–67 and peer. Son of Gilbert.

== Hendersons of Faringdon ==
- Alexander Henderson, MP 1898–1916
  - Harold Henderson, MP 1910–16. Son of Alexander.

== Hendersons of Rowley ==
- Arthur Henderson, MP 1903–35
  - Arthur Henderson, Baron Rowley, MP 1923–66. Son of Arthur.
  - William Henderson, 1st Baron Henderson, MP 1923–31. Son of Arthur.

== Hendrons ==
- Joe Hendron
- Jim Hendron. Brother of the above.

== Hicks-Beaches ==
- Michael Hicks-Beach (1760–1830), MP 1801–18
  - William Hicks-Beach (1783–1856), MP 1812–17. Son of Michael.

== Hodgeses ==
- Thomas Law Hodges, MP 1830–41 and 1847–52
  - Thomas Twisden Hodges, MP 1835–37 and 1847–52. Son of Thomas.

== Hodgsons ==
- Robin Hodgson, Baron Hodgson of Astley Abbotts
  - Fiona Hodgson, Baroness Hodgson of Abinger. Spouse of the above.

== Hoggs (Viscounts Hailsham) ==
- Douglas Hogg, 1st Viscount Hailsham, Lord Chancellor 1928–1929, 1935–1938
  - Quintin Hogg, 2nd Viscount Hailsham & Baron Hailsham of St Marylebone, Lord Chancellor 1970–1974, 1979–1987; son of Douglas
    - Douglas Hogg, 3rd Viscount Hailsham, politician; son of Quintin
    - Sarah Hogg, Baroness Hogg, political advisor to Prime Minister John Major; spouse of Douglas

== Holmes and Benn ==
- Daniel Holmes (1863–1955), MP for Glasgow Govan 1911–1918
  - William Wedgwood Benn, 1st Viscount Stansgate (1877–1960), son-in-law (See Benn section)

== Hoosons ==
- Tom Hooson, Conservative MP for Brecon and Radnor
  - his cousin and political opponent, Emlyn Hooson, Baron Hooson, Liberal MP for Montgomeryshire

== Hopes ==
- John Fitzalan Hope, MP 1900–29
  - Arthur, MP 1924–39.

== Hopkinsons ==
- Alfred Hopkinson, MP 1895–98 and 1926–29
  - Austin Hopkinson, MP 1918–29 and 1931–45.

== Hosie and Robison ==
- Stewart Hosie MP.
  - Shona Robison MSP. Spouse of the above.

== Howarths ==
- Gerald Howarth, Conservative MP
  - James Cartlidge, Conservative MP; son-in-law of Gerald

== Howes ==
- Geoffrey Howe and Elspeth Howe, Baroness Howe of Idlicote

== Hoyles ==
- Doug Hoyle, Baron Hoyle (1930–2024), Labour MP 1974–1979 1981–1997 and life peer.
  - Lindsay Hoyle (1957–), Labour MP 1997–2019 and the Speaker 2019–present. Son of Doug
  - Catherine Swindley, Chorley Borough Councillor. Spouse of Lindsay.
    - Natalie Lewis-Hoyle (1988/1989–2017), parish councillor at Heybridge, Maldon. daughter of Lindsay.
    - Miriam Lewis, district councillor at Maldon, Essex as of 2017. Mother of Natalie Lewis-Hoyle.

== Hubbards ==
- John Hubbard, 1st Baron Addington, MP 1859–87
  - Egerton Hubbard, 2nd Baron Addington, MP 1874–89. Son of Egerton.

== Hurds ==
- Sir Percy Hurd (1864–1950), MP for Frome (1918–23) and Devizes (1924–45)
  - Anthony Hurd (1901–1966), MP for Newbury (1945–64) and life peer. Son of Percy.
    - Douglas Hurd (1930–), MP for Mid-Oxfordshire (1974–1983), and Witney (1983–1997), Foreign Secretary. Son of Anthony.
      - Nick Hurd (1962–), Conservative MP for Ruislip-Northwood (2005–2019). Son of Douglas.
      - Michael Ancram, Member of Parliament, father-in-law of Nick.

== Husseys ==
- Derek Hussey, UUP MLA.
- Ross Hussey, UUP MLA. Brother of the above.

== Jacksons ==
- Caroline Jackson MEP 1984–2009
  - Robert V. Jackson MP. Spouse of the above.

== Janners ==
- Barnett Janner, Baron Janner (1892–1982), MP for Whitechapel and St Georges (1931–35), MP for Leicester West (1945–50), MP for Leicester North West (1950–1970), Labour life peer
  - Greville Janner, Baron Janner of Braunstone (1928–2015), MP for Leicester West and Leicester North West (1970–1997), Labour life peer

== Jays ==
- Douglas Jay, Baron Jay (1907–1996), MP 1946–1983.
- Peggy Jay (1913–2008), Labour London County Councilor. Spouse of Douglas.
  - Peter Jay (1937–), British Ambassador to the United States 1977–1979. Son of Douglas and Peggy.
  - Barbara Rutherford-Smith, sister-in-law of Peggy.
  - Margaret Jay (see Callaghans)
  - Virginia Bottomley, niece of Peggy.(see Bottomleys)

== Jegers ==
- Santo Jeger MP
  - Lena Jeger MP. Spouse of the above.
- George Jeger MP. Brother of Santo.
  - Peter Prinsley MP. Nephew of Santo and George.

== Jenkins ==
- Patrick Jenkin, Baron Jenkin of Roding (1926–2016), Conservative MP 1964–1987.
  - Bernard Jenkin (1959–), Conservative MP 1992–. Son of Patrick
  - Anne Jenkin, Baroness Jenkin of Kennington, Conservative life peer, spouse of Bernard
  - J. C. C. Davidson, 1st Viscount Davidson, Conservative politician, grandfather of Anne.
  - Frances Davidson, Viscountess Davidson, Conservative politician, spouse of J. C. C.

== Johnsons ==
- Stanley Johnson, Conservative MEP for Wight and Hampshire East (1979–1984)
  - Boris Johnson, Conservative Mayor of London (2008–2016), Conservative MP for Henley (2001–2008) and Uxbridge and South Ruislip (2015–2023), Prime Minister (2019–2022), son of Stanley
  - Rachel Johnson, Change UK candidate in the 2019 European Parliament election in the United Kingdom at South West England, daughter of Stanley,
  - Jo Johnson, Conservative MP for Orpington (2010–2019), life peer (2020–), son of Stanley
    - Matthew Evans, Baron Evans of Temple Guiting (1941–2016), Labour life peer. Maternal uncle of Amelia Gentleman, spouse of Jo.
- Emily Beavan, Labour councillor in Manchester and Bradford.
  - John Beavan, Baron Ardwick, life peer. Son of Emily. His granddaughter Carrie Symonds is Boris' wife.

== Joneses (Northern England) ==
- Dan Jones, Labour MP.
  - Dari Taylor, Labour MP; daughter of Dan.

== Joneses (Wales) ==
- Gwilym Jones, Conservative MP for Cardiff North (1983–1997). Also served as Parliamentary Under-Secretary of State for Wales (1994–1996)
- Fay Jones, Conservative MP for Brecon and Radnorshire (2019–present); daughter of Gwilym.

== Keens and Heal ==
- Alan Keen MP.
  - Ann Keen MP. Spouse of the above.
    - Sylvia Heal MP. Sister of the above.

== Kennedys of Southwark and Cardley ==
- Roy Kennedy, Baron Kennedy of Southwark
  - Alicia Kennedy, Baroness Kennedy of Cradley. Wife of the above.

== Kinnocks ==
- Neil Kinnock, Labour MP (1970–1995), Leader of the Labour Party (1983–1992), became a life peer in 2005.
- Glenys Kinnock, Labour MEP (1994–2009), became a life peer in 2009. Spouse of Neil.
  - Stephen Kinnock, Labour MP (2015–present). Son of Neil and Glenys.
    - Helle Thorning-Schmidt, Prime Minister of Denmark. Spouse of Stephen.

== Knollyses ==
- Sir Henry Knollys
  - Sir Francis Knollys. Brother of Henry.

== Lambs ==
- Thomas Phillipps Lamb, MP 1812–?
  - Thomas Davis Lamb, MP 1802–?. Son of Thomas.

== Lancaster and Dinenage ==
- Mark Lancaster (1970–), MP for North East Milton Keynes 2005–2010 and Milton Keynes North 2010–.
- Caroline Dinenage (1971–), MP for Gosport 2010–. Spouse of Mark.

== Laws ==
- Peter Law, MP.
  - Trish Law, AM. Wife of the above.

== Lechmeres ==
- Sir Nicholas Lechmere (1613–1701) MP for Bewdley, judge
    - Anthony Lechmere (MP) (1674–1720), MP for Bewdley 1710, Tewkesbury 1714–1717. Grandson of Sir Nicholas.
      - Edmund Lechmere (MP for Worcestershire) (1710–1805), MP for Worcestershire 1734–1747. Son of Anthony.
        - Nicholas Lechmere Charlton (1733–1807), MP for Worcester 1774. Son of Edmund (1710–1805).
          - Edmund Lechmere Charlton (1789–1845), MP for Ludlow 1835–1837. Son of Nicholas Lechmere Charlton.
        - Edmund Lechmere (MP for Worcester) (1747–1798), MP for Worcester 1790–1796. Son of Edmund (1710–1805).
    - Nicholas Lechmere, 1st Baron Lechmere (1675–1727), MP for Appleby 1708–1710, Cockermouth 1710–1717, Tewkesbury 1717–1721, Baron Lechmere 1721. Grandson of Sir Nicholas.

== Lefroys ==
- Thomas Langlois Lefroy, MP 1830–41
  - Anthony Lefroy, MP 1830–70. Son of Thomas.

== Lemons ==
- Sir William Lemon, 1st Baronet, MP 1801–24
  - Sir Charles Lemon, 2nd Baronet, MP 1807–57. Son of Wllliam.

== Levers ==
- Harold Lever, Baron Lever of Manchester MP.
- Leslie Maurice Lever MP. Brother of the above.

== Lewises ==
- Thomas Frankland Lewis, MP 1812–55
  - George Cornewall Lewis, MP 1847–63. Son of Thomas.

== Lindsays (Earls of Crawford) ==
- James Lindsay, 26th Earl of Crawford, Conservative MP and peer
  - David Lindsay, 27th Earl of Crawford, Conservative MP and peer. Son of James
    - David Lindsay, 28th Earl of Crawford, Conservative MP and peer. Son of David
      - Robert Lindsay, 29th Earl of Crawford, Conservative MP and peer. Son of David
    - James Lindsay, Conservative MP. Son of David
    - Reginald Manningham-Buller, 1st Viscount Dilhorne, Lord Chancellor. Son-in-law of David
      - Eliza Manningham-Buller, life peeress; daughter of Reginald
    - Godfrey Nicholson, Conservative politician; son-in-law of David
      - Emma Nicholson, Baroness Nicholson of Winterbourne, Liberal Democrat MP, MEP, and life peer. Daughter of Godfrey
      - Richard Luce, Baron Luce. Son-in-law of Godfrey. (see Luce section)
  - Ronald Lindsay, Ambassador. Son of James
    - Robert Lindsay, Australian politician. Grandson of James.

== Lloyd Georges ==
- David Lloyd George, Prime Minister and Liberal MP 1890–1945
  - Gwilym Lloyd George, 1st Viscount Tenby, son of David, Liberal MP 1922–1924 & 1929–1950; Liberal and Conservative MP 1951–1957; Home Secretary 1954–1957
    - William Lloyd George, 3rd Viscount Tenby, son of Gwilym, excepted hereditary peer
  - Megan Lloyd George, daughter of David, Liberal MP 1929–1951; Labour MP 1957–1966
    - Owen Lloyd George, 3rd Earl Lloyd-George of Dwyfor, grandson of David, active Crossbench member of the House of Lords 1968 – 1999.

== Longs and related persons ==
All of the Longs in this list are related to each other, sharing a common ancestor. Walter, the 1st Viscount Long stated in his autobiography in 1923, that there was an unbroken line of Longs serving Parliament in the House of Commons for about 300 years. This list spans 555 years.

- John Long of Draycot Cerne MP for Cricklade in 1442.
  - Thomas Long of Draycot MP for Westbury in 1491. Son of John.
    - Henry Long (MP 1552–1553) for Wiltshire. Son of Thomas.
    - Richard Long (courtier) MP for Southwark in 1539. Son of Thomas.
- Sir Robert Long, 1st Baronet MP for Devizes in 1626 and 1628–29, for Midhurst in 1640, for Tewkesbury in 1659 and Boroughbridge from 1661 to 1673. Also Secretary of State and Auditor of the Exchequer to Charles II.
  - Sir James Long, 2nd Baronet MP for Chippenham, MP for Malmesbury 1679, 1681, 1690–92. Nephew of Sir Robert.
    - Sir James Long, 5th Baronet MP for Chippenham in 1705, 1707, 1708, and 1710, and MP for Wootton Bassett in 1714. Grandson of Sir James, 2nd Bt.
      - Sir Robert Long, 6th Baronet MP for Wootton Bassett in 1734, and MP for Wiltshire in 1741. Son of Sir James, 5th Bt.
        - Richard Godolphin Long MP for Wiltshire 1806–18. Grandson of Richard Long (MP 1734–1741).
          - Walter Long Member for North Wiltshire from 1835 to 1865. Son of Richard Godolphin Long.
            - Richard Penruddocke Long MP for Chippenham 1859–65 and MP for North Wiltshire 1865–68. Son of Walter above.
              - Walter Long, 1st Viscount Long MP for North Wiltshire 1880–85, MP for Devizes 1885–92, MP for Liverpool West Derby 1893–1900, MP for Bristol South 1900–06, MP for South Dublin 1906–10, MP for Strand 1910–18, and MP for St George's 1918–21. Also served as Parliamentary Secretary to the Local Government Board, President of the Board of Agriculture, President of the Local Government Board, Chief Secretary for Ireland, leader of the Irish Unionist Parliamentary Party, First Lord of the Admiralty, Lord Lieutenant of Wiltshire. Son of R.P Long above.
                - Richard Chaloner, 1st Baron Gisborough MP for Westbury 1895–1900, MP for Abercromby 1910–1917. Brother of Walter, 1st Viscount Long.
                - Richard Long, 3rd Viscount Long MP for Westbury 1927–31. Son of Walter, 1st Viscount Long.
                  - Richard Long, 4th Viscount Long Conservative Opposition Whip in 1974 and Lord-in-Waiting from 1979 to 1997. Son of Richard above.
                - George Gibbs, 1st Baron Wraxall MP for Bristol West 1906–1928, Government Whip 1917–21. Son-in-law of Walter, 1st Viscount Long.
        - Sir James Tylney-Long, 7th Baronet MP for Marlborough 1762–1780, MP for Devizes (1780–1788) and MP for Wiltshire in 1788. Son of Sir Robert, 6th Bt.
          - William Pole-Tylney-Long-Wellesley, 4th Earl of Mornington MP for St Ives 1812–18 and MP for Wiltshire 1818. Son-in-law of Sir James Tylney-Long.
    - Richard Mason (politician) MP for Yarmouth 1673, MP for Bishop's Castle, Shropshire 1680–1. Son-in-law of Sir James Long, 2nd Bt.
  - Francis Russell, 4th Earl of Bedford MP for Lyme Regis, Custos Rotulorum of Devon. Great-grandson of Richard Long (courtier).
- Gifford Long MP for Westbury in 1625.
- Sir Walter Long, 1st Baronet MP for Salisbury in 1625, MP for Bath 1627, and MP for Ludgershall 1649.
  - Sir Philip Parker, 1st Baronet MP for Harwich 1679–85 and MP for Sandwich 1685–87. Grandson of Sir Walter Long, 1st Bt.
    - Sir Philip Parker-a-Morley-Long, 3rd Baronet MP for Harwich 1715–1734. Son of Sir Philip Parker 1st Bt.
- Lislebone Long MP in the protectorate Parliament for Wells in 1654, 1659, MP for Somerset 1656–8.
- Richard Long (MP 1694) for Chippenham.
  - Richard Long (MP 1734–1741) for Chippenham. Son of Richard above.
- John Rolls, 1st Baron Llangattock MP for Monmouthshire 1880–85. Grandson of Walter Long of Preshaw
- David Cunliffe-Lister, 2nd Earl of Swinton Deputy Chief Whip in the House of Lords under Margaret Thatcher 1982–1986. Government spokesman on agriculture and education 1983–1986. Great-great-great-grandson of Richard Godolphin Long.
- Charles Long, 1st Baron Farnborough
- Dudley Long North

== Lowthers ==
- William Lowther, 1st Earl of Lonsdale
  - William Lowther, 2nd Earl of Lonsdale
    - Henry Lowther, 3rd Earl of Lonsdale, MP 1847–72.
  - Henry Lowther, MP 1812–67.

== Luces ==
- Richard Luce (1867–1952), Conservative MP.
  - William Luce (1907–1977), Governor and Commander-in-Chief of Aden (1956–1960). Nephew of Richard.
    - Richard Luce, Baron Luce (1936–), Conservative MP and life peer. Son of William.

== Luttrells ==
- John Fownes Luttrell (1752–1816), MP 1801–16
  - John Fownes Luttrell (1787–1857), MP 1812–32. Son of John.

== Lyons ==
- Alex Lyon MP
  - Clare Short MP. Spouse of the above.

== Maberleys ==
- John Maberley, MP 1816–32
  - William Leader Maberley, MP 1819–34. Son of John.

== MacDonalds ==
- Sir Archibald Macdonald, 1st Baronet, MP 1777–92
- Ramsay MacDonald, MP 1906–37
  - Malcolm MacDonald, MP 1929–45
- Gordon Macdonald, 1st Baron Macdonald of Gwaenysgor, MP 1929–42
- Archie Macdonald, MP 1945–51
- Margo MacDonald, MP 1973–2011
- Lewis Macdonald, MSP 2011–
- Gordon MacDonald, MSP 2011–

== MacKay and Kirkbride ==
- Andrew MacKay, MP for Birmingham Stechford 1977–1979, East Berkshire 1983–1997 and Bracknell 1997–2010.
  - Julie Kirkbride, MP for Bromsgrove 1997–2010. Spouse of the above.

== Macmillans (Earl of Stockton) ==
- Harold Macmillan (1894–1986), MP for Stockton-on-Tees 1924–29, 1931–45, Bromley 1945–64, Prime Minister 1957–63, later Earl of Stockton. Married Dorothy Cavendish, daughter of Victor.
  - Maurice Macmillan (1921–1984), MP for Halifax 1955–64, Farnham 1966–83, South West Surrey 1983–84, Secretary of State; son of Harold
    - Alexander Macmillan, 2nd Earl of Stockton, peer, Member of the European Parliament 1999–2004. Son of Maurice.
      - Stormont Mancroft, 2nd Baron Mancroft, Conservative peer, step-father-in-law.
    - William Ormsby-Gore, 4th Baron Harlech, peer. Son-in-law of Maurice.
  - Julian Amery, MP 1950–1966 1969–1992. Son-in-law of Harold.
  - David Faber, MP. Grandson of Harold through daughter Caroline
    - Sidney Bernstein, Baron Bernstein, life peer. His son married David's sister.

== Mahons and Dowd ==
- Simon Mahon (1886–1961), Mayor of Bootle 1929.
  - Peter Mahon (1909–1980), MP 1964–1970. Son of Simon.
  - Simon Mahon (1914–1986), MP 1955–1979. Son of Simon.
  - Joseph Mahon, councillor at Bootle. Son of Simon.
    - Peter Dowd (1957–), MP 2015–. Great-nephew of both Peter and Simon.

== Mallalieus ==
- Frederick Mallalieu, MP for Colne Valley 1916–1922
  - Lance Mallalieu, Frederick's son, MP for Colne Valley 1931–35; then Labour MP for Brigg from 1948 to 1974. Son of Frederick.
  - Joseph Percival William Mallalieu, MP for Huddersfield 1945–50, then for Huddersfield East from 1950 to 1974 Son of Frederick.
    - Ann Mallalieu, J. P. W's daughter, is a Labour life peer since 1991 and is a leading pro-hunting campaigner

== Mancrofts ==
- Arthur Samuel, 1st Baron Mancroft, MP 1918–1937, Conservative peer,
  - Stormont Mancroft, 2nd Baron Mancroft, Conservative peer. Son of Arthur.
    - Benjamin Mancroft, 3rd Baron Mancroft, Conservative elected peer. Son of Stormont.

== Martins ==
- Michael Martin, Labour MP, Speaker of the House of Commons
  - Paul Martin, Labour MSP; son of Michael

== Maudes ==
- Angus Maude, Conservative politician
  - Francis Maude, Conservative politician; son of Angus

== Maxton ==
- James Maxton Labour MP 1922–1946
  - John Maxton Labour MP 1979–2001, is a Labour life peer since 2004, Nephew of James

== McAteers ==
Eddie McAteer, one-time leader of the Nationalist Party, was the brother of Hugh McAteer, a Sinn Féin and IRA activist, and the father of Fergus McAteer, a leader of the Irish Independence Party

== McCarthys ==
- Justin McCarthy (politician), MP 1879–1900
  - Justin Huntly McCarthy, MP 1884–92. Son of Justin.

== McCreas ==
- William McCrea, DUP MP and MLA.
  - Ian McCrea, DUP MLA; son of William.

== McGuinnesses ==
- Martin McGuinness, deputy First Minister of Northern Ireland
- Dodie McGuinness, Northern Ireland Forum member; sister-in-law of Martin

== McMahons ==
- Michael McMahon, Labour MSP
  - Siobhan McMahon, Labour MSP; daughter of Michael

== McNair-Wilsons ==
- Michael McNair-Wilson, Conservative MP for Walthamstow East 1967–70 and Newbury 1974–92.
- Patrick McNair-Wilson, Conservative MP for Lewisham West 1964–66 and New Forest from 1968 to 1997. Brother of the above.
- Laura Farris née McNair-Wilson, Conservative MP for Newbury (2019–present). Daughter of Michael, niece of Patrick.

== Meachers and Layard ==
- Michael Meacher MP
  - Molly Meacher, Baroness Meacher. Spouse of the above.
    - Richard Layard, Baron Layard. Spouse of the above.

== Middletons ==
- Gary Middleton MLA
  - Julie Middleton MLA. Spouse of the above.

== Mileses ==
- Philip John Miles, MP 1820–37.
  - Sir William Miles, 1st Baronet, MP 1818–65. Son of Philip.

== Milibands ==
- Ralph Miliband, noted political academic and Marxist
  - David Miliband, son of Ralph, advisor to Tony Blair, Labour MP for South Shields 2001–2013, member of the Cabinet 2005–2010. Son of Ralph.
  - Ed Miliband, son of Ralph, economic advisor to Gordon Brown, MP for Doncaster North 2005–present; leader of the Labour Party 2010–2015. Son of Ralph.
    - Justine Thornton, Queen's Bench High Court Judge 2019–. Spouse of Ed.

== Millars ==
- Frank Millar, Deputy Lord Mayor of Belfast
  - Frank Millar Jr, UUP Assembly member; son of Frank

== Mitchells ==
- David Mitchell (1928–2014), Conservative MP 1964–1997.
  - Andrew Mitchell (1956–), Conservative MP 1987–1997 2001–. Son of David.

== Morgans ==
- Rhodri Morgan, First Minister of Wales
  - Julie Morgan, MP and Welsh AM. Spouse of the above.

== Morleys ==
- Samuel Morley, MP 1866–85
  - Arnold Morley, MP 1880–95. Son of Arnold.

== Morrises ==
- Alf Morris, Labour MP for Manchester Wythenshawe 1964–1997
- Charles Morris, Labour MP for Manchester Openshaw 1963–83, Alf's brother
  - Estelle Morris, Labour MP for Birmingham Yardley 1992–2005, Secretary of State, Baroness Morris of Yardley from 2005, Charles' daughter

== Morrisons ==
- Hugh Morrison, Conservative politician
  - John Morrison, 1st Baron Margadale, Conservative politician; son of Hugh
    - Charles Morrison, Conservative MP for Devizes 1964–1992; son of John
    - Peter Morrison, Conservative MP for Chester 1974–1992; son of John
      - Hugh Trenchard, 3rd Viscount Trenchard, excepted hereditary peer; grandson-in-law of John
- James Morrison, Conservative MP; brother of Hugh

== Morrison and Mandelson ==
- Herbert Morrison (1888–1965), Labour MP 1920s – 1950s, held various senior positions including Chair of the Labour Party and Leader of London County Council, later Cabinet Minister 1940–1951, as Deputy Prime Minister 1945–1951 and spells as variously Home Secretary, Foreign Secretary and Leader of the House of Commons
  - Peter Mandelson (born 1953), Labour MP for Hartlepool (1992–2004), Cabinet Minister 1998 and as Northern Ireland Secretary 1999–2001, European Commissioner for Trade 2004–2008, Cabinet Minister 2008 – 10; grandson of Herbert Morrison

== Mosleys of Ancoats ==
- Oswald Mosley MP
  - Lady Cynthia Mosley MP. Spouse of the above.

== Mundells ==
- David Mundell, Conservative MP and MSP
  - Oliver Mundell, son of David, Conservative MSP

== Nairns and Spencer-Nairns ==
- Sir Michael Nairn of Rankeilour, 2nd Baronet, Deputy Lieutenant of Fife
  - Sir Douglas Spencer-Nairn, 2nd Baronet (1906–1970), MP for Central Ayrshire 1955–1959. Nephew of Michael.
    - Christopher Frank Spencer-Nairn (1949–), Conservative Westminster candidate at Moray in 2001
    - Humphrey Atkins, Baron Colnbrook (1922–1996), who married Douglas' sister Margaret Spencer-Nairn (1924–2012)

== Normans ==
- Sir Henry Norman, 1st Baronet (1858–1939), MP 1900–1910 1910–1923
  - Sir Mark Norman, 3rd Baronet (1927–2013), High Sheriff of Oxfordshire 1983–1984. Grandson of Henry.
  - Jesse Norman (1962-), MP 2010-. Great-grandson of Henry. and nephew of Mark.

== Nott and Swire ==
- John Nott, Conservative politician
  - Hugo Swire, Conservative politician; son-in-law of John

== Nuttalls ==
- Sir Nicholas Nuttall, 3rd Baronet, while not a politician, had several marriage connections:
  - Christopher York MP, father-in-law
  - Alexander Macmillan, 2nd Earl of Stockton, peer, married Nicholas' third wife.
  - Lord Patrick Beresford, a previous wife of Nicholas' second wife, was the son of John Charles de La Poer Beresford, 7th Marquess of Waterford, who sat in the House of Lords as Baron Tyrone.

== O'Connells ==
- Daniel O'Connell, MP 1828–46
  - John, MP 1832–57. Son of Daniel.
  - Maurice, MP 1832–53. Son of Daniel.
  - Morgan O'Connell, MP 1832–40. Son of Daniel.

== Ormsby-Gores ==
- William Ormsby-Gore, MP 1806–57
  - John Ormsby-Gore, 1st Baron Harlech, MP 1837–76 and peer.

== Overends ==
Robert Overend, Vanguard Unionist member of the Northern Ireland Constitutional Convention

Sandra Overend, Ulster Unionist MLA and daughter-in-law of Robert Overend
Billy Armstrong, Ulster Unionist MLA and father of Sandra Overend

== Pagets ==
- Henry Paget, 1st Earl of Uxbridge, peer
  - Henry Paget, 1st Marquess of Anglesey, MP 1790–1804 1806–10. Son of Henry.
  - Arthur Paget 1794–1807. Son of Henry.
  - Berkeley Paget 1807–26. Son of Henry.
  - Charles Paget 1804–26 and 1831–33 and 1833–34. Son of Henry.
  - Edward Paget, 1796–1806 and 1810–20. Son of Henry.
  - William Paget 1790–94. Son of Henry.

== Paisleys ==
- Ian Paisley (1926–2014), First Minister of Northern Ireland 2007–2008.
- Eileen Paisley, Baroness Paisley of St George's (1931–), DUP MLA and life peer. Spouse of Ian.
  - Ian Paisley Jr (1966–), DUP MLA 1998–2010 and MP 2010–24. Son of Ian and Eileen.
  - Rhonda Paisley (1960–), Belfast City Councillor. Daughter of Ian and Eileen.

== Patons ==
- John Paton MP.
  - Florence Paton MP. Spouse of the above.

== Pawseys ==
- Jim Pawsey (1933–), MP 1979–1987.
  - Mark Pawsey (1957–), MP 2010–.

== Peases ==
- Joseph Pease (1799–1872), Quaker railway company promoter and industrialist, MP for South Durham, 1832–1841
- Henry Pease (1807–1881), railway owner and peace campaigner, younger brother of Joseph Pease, Liberal MP for South Durham, 1857–1859
  - Sir Joseph Whitwell Pease, first baronet (1828–1903), Quaker industrialist and banker, son of Joseph Pease, Liberal MP for South Durham, 1865–1885 and for Barnard Castle, 1885–1903
  - Edmund Backhouse (1824–1906), Quaker banker, second cousin, wife's nephew, and business associate of Joseph Pease, Liberal MP for Darlington, 1867–1880
  - Sir Theodore Fry, first baronet (1836–1912), Quaker industrialist, married to Sophia Pease (niece of Joseph and Henry Pease), Liberal MP for Darlington, 1880–1895
  - Arthur Pease (1837–1898), coal and ironstone mine-owner, son of Joseph Pease, Liberal MP for Whitby, 1880–1885 and for Darlington, 1895–1898
  - Henry Fell Pease (1838–1896), coal and ironstone mine-owner, son of Henry Pease, Liberal MP for Cleveland division of the North Riding, 1885–1896
    - Sir Alfred Edward Pease, second baronet (1857–1939), politician and sportsman, elder son of Sir Joseph Whitwell Pease, Liberal MP for York, 1885–1892 and for the Cleveland division of the North Riding from 1897 to 1902
    - Joseph Albert Pease, first Baron Gainford (1860–1943), younger son of Sir Joseph Whitwell Pease, Liberal MP for Tynemouth from 1892 to 1900, Saffron Walden from 1900 – January 1910 and Rotherham from March 1910 – 1916. He was Chancellor of the Duchy of Lancaster, President of the Board of Education and Postmaster General.
    - Herbert Pike Pease first Baron Daryngton (1867–1949), son of Arthur Pease, MP for Darlington, sitting as a Liberal Unionist and then a Unionist 1898–1910, as a Conservative 1910–1923, and in the House of Lords 1923–1949.
    - William Edwin Pease (1865–1926), industrialist, Conservative MP for Darlington, 1923–1926
      - Michael Beaumont (1903–1958), soldier, son-in-law of Joseph Albert Pease, Conservative MP for Aylesbury, 1929–1938
        - Joseph Edward Pease, 3rd Baron Gainford (born 1921), grandson of Joseph Albert Pease, Conservative member of the House of Lords 1971–1999
        - Timothy Beaumont, Baron Beaumont of Whitley (1928–2008), clergyman, publisher and politician, grandson of Joseph Albert Pease, Liberal, Liberal Democrat and from 1999 Green Party member of the House of Lords 1967–2008

== Peels ==
- Sir Robert Peel, 1st Baronet (1750–1830), MP for Tamworth 1790–1820.
  - Sir Robert Peel, 2nd Baronet (1788–1850), first son of Robert, Prime Minister 1834–1835 1841–1846, MP for Cashel 1809–1812, Chippenham 1812–1817, Oxford University 1817–1829, Westbury 1829–1830, Tamworth 1830–1850.
    - Sir Robert Peel, 3rd Baronet (1822–1895), Chief Secretary for Ireland 1861–1865. Son of Robert.
    - Frederick Peel, MP 1849–65, Financial Secretary to the Treasury 1860–1865. Son of Robert.
    - Arthur Peel, 1st Viscount Peel, Speaker of the House of Commons 1884–1895. Son of Robert.
      - William Peel, 1st Earl Peel, MP 1900–1906 1909–1912, Lord Keeper of the Privy Seal 1931, created peer
        - Arthur Peel, 2nd Earl Peel (1901–1969), Lord Lieutenant of Lancashire 1948–51 and peer. Son of William.
          - William Peel, 3rd Earl Peel, Conservative-later-crossbench peer, Lord Chamberlain of the Household (2006–). Son of Arthur.
      - George Peel, MP for Spalding 1917–18.
      - Sidney Peel, MP for Uxbridge 1918–22.
  - William Yates Peel, second son of Robert, MP for Bossiney 1817–1818, Tamworth 1818–1830 1835–1837 1847, Yarmouth 1830–1831, Cambridge University 1831–1832
    - Arthur Peel (1861–1952), Envoy Extraordinary to Siam, Brazil, and Bulgaria. Grandson of William through Arthur.
    - Robert Francis Peel (1874–1924), MP for Woodbridge 1910–1920, Governor of Saint Helena 1920–1925
  - Edmund Peel, third son of Robert, MP for Newcastle-under-Lyme 1831–1832 1835–1837
  - Jonathan Peel, fourth son of Robert, MP for Norwich 1826–1830, Huntingdon 1831–1868
    - Sir Robert Morier, son-in-law, ambassador
    - Michael Biddulph, 1st Baron Biddulph, son-in-law, MP for Herefordshire (1865–1880) and Ross (1885–1900)
  - Laurence Peel, sixth son of Robert, MP for Cockermouth 1827–1830
    - Charles Lennox Peel (1823–1899), Clerk of the Privy Council 1875–1898
- Robert Peel Dawson (1818–1877). Grandson of Robert through Mary. (see Dawsons)

== Pelhams ==
- Henry Pelham, Prime Minister (1743–1754)
- Thomas Pelham-Holles, 1st Duke of Newcastle, Prime Minister (1757–1762). Brother of the above.

== Percival ==
- John Perceval, 2nd Earl of Egmont First Lord of the Admiralty 1763–1766 and sat in the House of Commons for several constituencies.
  - Spencer Perceval MP for Northampton 1796–1812, Chancellor of the Exchequer 1807–1812, Leader of the House of Commons 1807–1812, Chancellor of the Duchy of Lancaster 1807–1812, Prime Minister of the United Kingdom 1809–1812. Son of John Perceval, 2nd Earl of Egmont.

== Perkins ==
- A. P. Herbert (1890–1971), MP 1935–1950.
  - Toby Perkins (1970–), MP 2010–.

== Perrys ==
- Roy Perry, Conservative MEP
  - Caroline Nokes, Conservative MP; daughter of Roy.

== Philipses ==
- Sir George Philips, 1st Baronet, MP 1812–35
  - Sir George Philips, 2nd Baronet, MP 1818–52.

== Pitts (Earl of Chatham) and Stanhopes ==
Three prominent political dynasties of the 18th, 19th and 20th centuries, interrelated through several marriages.

- Thomas Pitt ("Diamond" Pitt), governor of the British East India Company
  - Robert Pitt, politician, son of Thomas "Diamond" Pitt
    - Thomas Pitt, son of Robert
      - Thomas Pitt, 1st Baron Camelford, son of Thomas
        - Thomas Pitt, 2nd Baron Camelford, son of Thomas, 1st Baron
        - William Wyndham Grenville, 1st Baron Grenville, Prime Minister; son-in-law of Thomas, 1st Baron
    - William Pitt, 1st Earl of Chatham ("William Pitt the Elder"), Prime Minister; son of Robert, brother-in-law of Prime Minister George Grenville (see below)
      - John Pitt, 2nd Earl of Chatham, politician, son of William, 1st Earl
      - William Pitt ("William Pitt the Younger), Prime Minister; son of William Pitt, 1st Earl of Chatham
  - Thomas Pitt, 1st Earl of Londonderry, son of Thomas "Diamond" Pitt
  - John Pitt, son of Thomas "Diamond" Pitt
  - James Stanhope, 1st Earl Stanhope, son-in-law of Thomas "Diamond" Pitt, married to Lucy Pitt
    - Philip Stanhope, 2nd Earl Stanhope, son of James and Lucy
      - Charles Stanhope, 3rd Earl Stanhope, son of Philip, son-in-law of William Pitt, 1st Earl of Chatham (by 1st marriage to Hester Pitt), great-nephew-in-law of George Grenville (by 2nd marriage to Louisa Grenville)
        - Philip Henry Stanhope, 4th Earl Stanhope, son of Charles and Louisa by second marriage
          - James Stanhope, 7th Earl Stanhope, descendant of Philip Henry
      - Edward Stanhope, politician, son of Philip
- Richard Temple, 1st Viscount Cobham, politicians
  - Richard Grenville, brother-in-law of Richard. Continue to the Grenvilles section.

== Plunkett-Ernle-Erle-Drax ==
- John Plunkett, 17th Baron of Dunsany (1853–1899), MP 1886–1892.
  - Richard Drax (1958–), MP 2010–. Great-grandson of John.

== Pootses ==
- Charles Poots, DUP Northern Ireland Constitutional Convention member
  - Edwin Poots, DUP MLA, son of Charles

== Prentices ==
- Bridget Prentice, MP for Lewisham East 1992–2010.
  - Gordon Prentice, MP for Pendle 1992–2010. Spouse of the above.

== Prices ==
- William Philip Price, MP 1852–73
  - William Edwin Price, MP 1868–80. Son of William.

== Priors ==
- Jim Prior, Baron Prior, Conservative politician
  - David Prior, Baron Prior of Brampton, Conservative politician, son of Jim

== Redmonds ==
- John Redmond, MP 1881–1918
  - William Redmond, MP 1910–22. Son of John.

== Reids ==
- Jimmy Reid, (1932–2010), trade unionist, Clydebank burgh councillor.
    - Joani Reid, MP for East Kilbride and Strathaven (2024–present), Granddaughter of Jimmy

== Ridleys ==
- Sir Matthew White Ridley, MP 1801–12
  - Nicholas Ridley-Colborne, MP 1805–37. Son of Matthew.

== Robinsons ==
- Peter Robinson (born 1948), First Minister of Northern Ireland
  - Iris Robinson MP and MLA.

== Roes ==
- Marion Roe, MP 1983 to 2005
  - Philippa Roe, life peer and council leader. Daughter of Marion.

== Rothschilds (Baron Rothschild) ==
- Nathan Mayer Rothschild, not a politician
  - Sir Anthony de Rothschild, 1st Baronet, High Sheriff of Buckinghamshire (1861)
    - Cyril Flower, 1st Baron Battersea, son-in-law of Anthony by his elder daughter Constance, MP for Brecon (1880–1885) and Luton (1880–1885) and peer
    - Charles Yorke, 5th Earl of Hardwicke, brother-in-law of Anthony's younger daughter Annie, MP for Cambridgeshire (1865–1973) and Conservative peer
    - Nathan Rothschild, 1st Baron Rothschild, nephew of Anthony, MP for Aylesbury (1865–1885), Lord Lieutenant of Buckinghamshire (1889–1915), and peer
      - Walter Rothschild, 2nd Baron Rothschild, son of Nathan, MP for Aylesbury (1899–1910) and peer
        - Victor Rothschild, 3rd Baron Rothschild, son of Walter, Labour peer
          - Jacob Rothschild, 4th Baron Rothschild, son of Victor, peer
          - Zac Goldsmith, grandson-in-law of Victor through Amschel (see Goldsmith section)
  - Lionel de Rothschild, son of Nathan Mayer, MP for City of London (1847–1868; 1869–1874)
    - Ferdinand de Rothschild, son-in-law of Lionel, MP for Aylesbury (1885–1898)
      - James de Rothschild, grandnephew of Ferdinand, MP for Isle of Ely (1929–1945)
    - Lionel de Rothschild, grandson of Lionel, MP for Aylesbury (1910–1922)
  - Mayer Amschel de Rothschild, son of Nathan Mayer, High Sheriff of Buckinghamshire (1847) and MP for Hythe (1859–1874)
    - Archibald Primrose, 5th Earl of Rosebery, son-in-law of Mayer Amschel, Prime Minister of the United Kingdom
  - Henry FitzRoy, son-in-law of Anthony, MP for Great Grimsby (1831–1832) and Lewes (1837–1841, 1842–1859)

== Runcimans ==
- Walter Runciman, 1st Baron Runciman, MP 1914–?.
  - Walter Runciman, 1st Viscount Runciman of Doxford (1870–1949), MP 1899–? and peer. Son of Walter.
    - Hilda Runciman, Viscountess Runciman of Doxford (1869–1956), MP. Spouse of the above.

== Russells ==
- William Russell, 1st Duke of Bedford (1613–1700), eldest son of Francis Russell, 4th Earl of Bedford (see Longs and related persons above), MP for Tavistock in the Short Parliament and the Long Parliament
  - William Russell, Lord Russell (1639–1683), third son of the 1st Duke of Bedford. He was a leading member of the Country Party, forerunners of the Whigs, who opposed the succession of James II during the reign of Charles II, ultimately resulting in his execution for treason for his involvement in the Rye House Plot
    - John Russell, 4th Duke of Bedford (1710–1771), fourth son of the 2nd and brother of the 3rd Duke of Bedford. Whig First Lord of the Admiralty (1744–17480), Secretary of State for the Southern Department (1748–1751), Lord Lieutenant of Ireland (1757–1761), Lord Privy Seal (1761–1763) and Lord President of the Council (1763–1765)
      - Francis Russell, Marquess of Tavistock (1739–1767), eldest son of the 4th Duke of Bedford. Whig MP in the Irish House of Commons for Armagh Borough 1759–1761 and then in the British House of Commons for Bedfordshire until 1767
        - Francis Russell, 5th Duke of Bedford (1765–1802), eldest son of the Marquess of Tavistock. Whig politician, responsible for much of the development of central Bloomsbury.
        - John Russell, 6th Duke of Bedford (1766–1839), younger son of the Marquess of Tavistock. Whig politician, Lord Lieutenant of Ireland 1806–1807
          - Lord John Russell, 1st Earl Russell (1792–1878), 1st Earl Russell, third son of the 6th Duke of Bedford. Whig and Liberal Prime Minister (1846–1852, 1865–1866) and Foreign Secretary (1852–1853, 1859–1865)
            - Frank Russell, 2nd Earl Russell (1865–1931), 2nd Earl Russell, eldest grandson of PM Lord John Russell, brother of Bertrand Russell. First peer to join the Labour Party and Labour's Leader in the House of Lords. He was Parliamentary Secretary to the Minister of Transport and Under-Secretary of State for India in Ramsay MacDonald's government 1929–1931
              - Conrad Russell, 5th Earl Russell (1937–2004), second son of Bertrand Russell. He was the first parliamentarian to take his seat as a Liberal Democrat (in the House of Lords), shortly after the party was formed in 1988 from a merger of the Liberal Party and the Social Democratic Party. Lord Russell was elected at the top of his party's list of hereditary peers to retain their seats after all but 92 hereditary peers were removed from the House of Lords in 1999.
          - Francis Russell, 7th Duke of Bedford (1788–1861), eldest son of the 6th Duke of Bedford. Whig MP for Peterborough (1809–1812) and Bedfordshire (1812–1832)
            - William Russell, 8th Duke of Bedford (1809–1872), only son of the 7th Duke of Bedford. Whig MP for Tavistock 1832–1841
            - Francis Russell, 9th Duke of Bedford (1819–1891), grandson of the 6th Duke of Bedford. Liberal MP for Bedfordshire 1847–1872
              - George Russell, 10th Duke of Bedford (1852–1893), eldest son of the 9th Duke of Bedford. Liberal MP for Bedfordshire 1875–1885

== Sainsburys ==
- Alan Sainsbury, Baron Sainsbury, Liberal life peer
  - John Sainsbury, Baron Sainsbury of Preston Candover, Conservative life peer; son of Alan
  - Tim Sainsbury, Conservative politician; son of Alan
    - Shaun Woodward, Conservative, then Labour MP; son-in-law of Tim
  - David Sainsbury, Baron Sainsbury of Turville, Labour life peer; nephew of Alan

== Samuels and Montagus ==
- Samuel Montagu, 1st Baron Swaythling (1832–1911), Banker (founder of Samuel Montagu & Co.) and Liberal MP for Whitechapel 1885–1900
  - Louis Montagu, 2nd Baron Swaythling, son of Samuel Montagu. Political activist, founder of the anti-Zionist League of British Jews.
  - Sir Stuart Samuel, 1st Baronet (1856–1926), nephew of Samuel Montagu, elder brother of Herbert Samuel. Liberal MP for Whitechapel 1900–1916.
  - Herbert Louis Samuel, 1st Viscount Samuel (1870–1963), nephew of Samuel Montgu, younger brother of Stuart Samuel. Liberal MP for Cleveland 1902–1918, for Darwen 1929–1935. Chancellor of the Duchy of Lancaster 1909–1910 and 1915–1916, Postmaster General 1910–1914 and 1915–1916, President of the Local Government Board 1914–1915, Home Secretary 1916 and 1931–1932, High Commissioner of Palestine 1920–1925. Liberal leader 1931–1935
    - Edwin Samuel, 2nd Viscount Samuel (1898–1978), son of the 1st Viscount. Legislator in the House of Lords.

== Samuelsons ==
- Sir Bernhard Samuelson, MP 1859–95
  - Henry Samuelson, MP 1868–85. Son of Henry.

== Sandys ==
- Edwin Sandys (bishop) (1519–1588), Archbishop of York
  - Sir Samuel Sandys (died 1623) (1560–1623), MP for Ripon 1586, Worcestershire 1609–1622. Son of the archbishop.
    - Sir Edwin Sandys (died 1623) (1591–1623), MP for Droitwich 1614, Pontefract 1621–1622. Son of Sir Samuel.
      - Sir Samuel Sandys (Royalist) (1615–1685). MP for Droitwich 1640–1642, 1660, Worcestershire 1661–1681, Droitwich 1681–1685. Son of Sir Edwin.
        - Samuel Sandys (died 1701) (c. 1637–1701), MP for Droitwich 1661–1681, 1685–1690. Son of Sir Samuel.
          - Edwin Sandys (MP for Worcestershire) (1659–1699), MP for Worcestershire 1695–1698. Son of Samuel.
            - Samuel Sandys, 1st Baron Sandys (1695–1770), MP for Worcester 1718–1743, Chancellor of the Exchequer, Baron Sandys 1743. Son of Edwin.
              - Edwin Sandys, 2nd Baron Sandys (1726–1797), MP for Droitwich 1747–1754, Bossiney 1754–1762, Westminster 1762–1770. Son of 1st Baron.
  - Sir Edwin Sandys (died 1629) (1561–1629), MP for 6 constituencies. Son of the archbishop.
    - Henry Sandys (MP) (c. 1607–1640), MP for Mitchell 1625. Son of Sir Edwin.
  - Sir Miles Sandys, 1st Baronet (1563–1645), MP for Cambridge University 1614, Huntingdon 1621–1622, Cambridgeshire 1628–1629. Son of the archbishop.
- Miles Sandys (died 1601) (c. 1520–1601), MP for 8 constituencies. Brother of the archbishop.
  - Edwin Sandys (died 1608) (c. 1564–1608), MP for Andover 1586–1587. Son of Miles.
    - Miles Sandys (died 1636) (c. 1601–1636), MP for Cirencester 1625–1626. Grandson of Miles (died 1601).
    - William Sandys (waterworks engineer) (c. 1607–1669), MP for Evesham 1640–1641, 1661–1669. Grandson of Miles (died 1601).

== Sarwar ==
- Chaudhry Mohammad Sarwar (1950–), Labour MP for Glasgow Govan 1997–2005 & Glasgow Central 2005–2010. Later moved to Pakistan, serving as Governor of Punjab 2013–2015, then as a member of the Senate of Pakistan in 2018, before being re-appointed as Governor of Punjab 2018–2022.
  - Anas Sarwar (1983–), son of Mohammad. Labour MP for Glasgow Central 2010–2015, Deputy Leader of the Scottish Labour Party 2011–2014, Labour MSP for Glasgow 2016–2026, Leader of the Scottish Labour Party 2021–2026, Member of the House of Lords 2026–present.

== Seymours (Marquess of Hertford) ==
- Francis Seymour-Conway, 1st Marquess of Hertford, peer, Lord Lieutenant of Warwickshire 1757–1794 and Montgomeryshire 1775–1776
  - Francis Ingram-Seymour-Conway, 2nd Marquess of Hertford, first son of Francis, MP for Lisburn 1761–1768, County Antrim 1768–1776, Lostwithiel 1766–1768, and Orford 1768–1794, Tory peer, Lord Lieutenant of Warwickshire 1816–1822
  - Henry-Seymour-Conway (later Lord Henry Seymour), second son of Francis, MP for County Antrim 1776–1783, Coventry 1766–1774, Midhurst 1774–1780, Downton 1780–1784
  - Lord Robert Seymour, third son of Francis, MP 1771–1790 and 1794–1820
  - Lord Hugh Seymour, fifth son of Francis, MP 1784–1786 and 1788–1801
  - Lord William Seymour, sixth son of Francis, MP 1783–1784 and 1785–1796
  - Lord George Seymour, seventh son of Francis, MP 1784–90 and 1796–1801

== Sharpleses ==
- Richard Sharples, Governor of Bermuda
  - Pamela Sharples, Baroness Sharples, life peer

== Shelleys ==
- Sir John Shelley, MP 1806–31
  - John Villiers Shelley, MP 1830–67. Son of John.

== Shinwells and Bergers ==
- Manny Shinwell, Baron Shinwell, MP 1922–1924 1928–1931 1935–1970 and life peer.
  - Luciana Berger, MP 2010–. Great-niece of Lord Shinwell.

== Sillars and MacDonalds ==
- Jim Sillars, MP for South Ayrshire 1970–1979 and Glasgow Govan 1988–1992
  - Margo MacDonald, MP for Glasgow Govan 1973–1974 and MSP. Spouse of the above.

== Silkins ==
- Lewis Silkin, Labour MP for Peckham 1936–50
  - John Silkin, Labour MP for Deptford 1963–87, Lewis' son
  - Samuel Silkin, Labour MP for Dulwich 1964–83, Lewis' son

== Sinclairs ==
- Sir John Sinclair, 1st Baronet (1754–1835), Scottish Whig MP for Caithness 1780–1784, 1790–1796, 1802–1806, 1807–1811, Lostwithiel 1784–1790, Petersfield 1797–1802. He was the first person to use the word statistics in the English language.
  - Sir George Sinclair, 2nd Baronet (1790–1868), eldest son of the 1st Baronet. Scottish Whig MP for Caithness 1811, 1818–1820 and 1831–1841
    - Sir John Sinclair, 3rd Baronet (1825–1912), eldest son of the 2nd Baronet. Scottish Liberal MP for Caithness 1869–1885
      - Archibald Sinclair, 1st Viscount Thurso (1890–1970), 4th Baronet, grandson of the 3rd Baronet. Scottish Liberal MP for Caithness and Sunderland 1922–1945, Liberal Chief Whip 1930–1931, Secretary of State for Scotland 1931–1932, Secretary of State for Air 1940–1945. Leader of the Liberal Party 1935–1945.
        - John Archibald Sinclair, 3rd Viscount Thurso, known as John Thurso (b. 1953), grandson of the 1st Viscount. Scottish Liberal Democrat MP for Caithness, Sutherland and Easter Ross 2001–2015. The first British hereditary peer allowed to sit in the Commons without first disclaiming his title (possible because of the exclusion of hereditary peers from the House of Lords in 1999). Excepted hereditary peer.
        - Veronica Linklater (b. 1943), Baroness Linklater of Butterstone, granddaughter of the 1st Viscount. Liberal Democrat life peer since 1997.

== Smiles ==
- Sir Walter Smiles, Conservative MP for Blackburn 1931–45, Ulster Unionist MP for Down, then North Down 1945–53
  - Patricia Ford, MP for North Down 1953–1955. Daughter of Walter.
    - Michael Grylls, son-in-law of Patricia Ford, Conservative MP for Chertsey and then North West Surrey
  - Nigel Fisher, MP for Hitchin 1950–1955 and Surbiton 1955–1983. Spouse of Patricia Ford
    - Mark Fisher, son of Nigel Fisher and stepson of Patricia Ford, Labour MP for Stoke-on-Trent Central

== Smiths and Abel Smiths (Baron Carrington and Baron Bicester) ==
- John Smith (c1470–1547), Baron of the Exchequer.
  - Francis Smith (1522–1606), High Sheriff of Leicestershire. Son of John
    - Thomas Smith (c1682–1727/1728), High Sheriff of Leicestershire 1717–1718. Great-great-grandnephew of Francis through the latter's brother William.
      - Abel Smith (1717–1788), MP 1774–78 1780–88. Nephew of Thomas and brother of George.
        - Abel Smith (1748–1779), MP 1778–79. Second son of Abel.
          - Mary Smith. Her husband John Sargent was the son of John Sargent MP.
        - Robert Smith, 1st Baron Carrington (1752–1838), MP and peer. Third son of Abel.
          - Robert Carrington, 2nd Baron Carrington (1796–1868), MP and peer. Son of Robert.
            - Charles Wynn-Carington, 1st Marquess of Lincolnshire (1843–1928), MP, peer, and Lord Privy Seal 1911–1912. First son of Robert.
            - William Carington (1845–1914), MP 1868–1883. Second son of Robert.
            - Rupert Carington, 4th Baron Carrington (1852–1929), MP and peer. Third son of Robert.
              - Rupert Carington, 5th Baron Carrington (1891–1938), peer. Son of Rupert.
                - Peter Carington, 6th Baron Carrington (1919–2018), peer, life peer. Son of Peter.
                  - Rupert Carington, 7th Baron Carrington (1948–), elected peer. Son of Peter.
        - Samuel Smith (1754–1834), MP 1801–32. Fourth son of Abel.
          - Abel Smith (1788–1859), MP 1810–47. Son of Samuel.
            - Abel Smith (1829–1898), MP 1854–98. Son of Abel.
              - Abel Henry Smith (1862–1930), MP 1892–1910. Son of Abel.
          - Samuel George Smith (1822–1900), MP 1859–80. Grandson of Samuel through Samuel.
          - Henry Abel Smith (1826–1890), DL. Grandson of Samuel through Henry.
            - Sir Henry Abel Smith (1900–1993), Governor of Queensland 1958–66. Grandson of Henry through Francis.
              - Richard Abel Smith (1933–2004), Vice Lord-Lieutenant of Nottinghamshire 1991–9. Son of Henry.
              - David Liddell-Grainger (1930–2007), Berwickshire County Councillor and DL for Berwickshire. Son-in-law of Henry.
                - Ian Liddell-Grainger (1959–), MP 2001–. Son of David.
        - George Smith (1765–1836), MP 1791–96 1800–31. Sixth son of Abel.
          - George Robert Smith (1793–1863), MP 1831–32 1838–41. Son of George.
            - Eric Carrington Smith (1828–1906), DL. Grandson of George through Oswald.
              - Basil Guy Oswald Smith (1861–1928), High Sheriff of Berkshire 1917. Nephew of Eric.
        - John Smith (1767–1842), MP 1802–35. Seventh son of Abel.
          - John Abel Smith (1802–1871), MP 1830–59. Elder son of John.
            - Hugh Colin Smith (1836–1910), Governor of the Bank of England 1897–99. Son of John.
              - Vivian Smith, 1st Baron Bicester (1867–1956), Lord Lieutenant of Oxfordshire 1934–1956 and peer. Son of Hugh.
                - Randal Smith, 2nd Baron Bicester (1898–1968), High Sheriff of Oxfordshire 1945 and peer. Son of Vivian.
                  - Angus Edward Vivian Smith, 3rd Baron Bicester (1932–2014), 1999-excluded peer. Nephew of Randal.
          - Martin Tucker Smith (1803–1880), MP 1831–32, 1847–65. Youuger son of John.
            - Gerard Smith (1839–1920), MP 1883–85 and Governor of Western Australia 1895–1908
      - Sir George Smith, 1st Bt (c1714-1769), High Sheriff of Nottinghamshire 1758–59. Nephew of Thomas and brother of Abel.
        - Sir George Pauncefote-Bromley, 2nd Bt (1753–1808), High Sheriff of Gloucestershire. Son of George.
          - Sir Robert Howe Bromley, 3rd Bt (1778–1857), High Sheriff of Nottinghamshire 1816–17. Son of George.
            - Sir Henry Bromley, 4th Bt (1816–1895), Deputy Lieutenant. Son of Robert.
              - Sir Robert Bromley, 6th Bt (1874–1906), Administrator of St Kitts and Nevis 1904–1906.
              - Sir Maurice Bromley-Wilson, 7th Bt (1875–1957), High Sheriff of Westmorland 1901.

== Smiths of Gilmorehill ==
- John Smith (1938–1994), MP for North Lanarkshire 1970–1983 and Monklands East 1983–1994.
  - Elizabeth Smith, Baroness Smith of Gilmorehill, life peer. Spouse of the above.
  - George Robertson, Baron Robertson of Port Ellen (born 1946), MP for Hamilton 1978–1997 and Hamilton South 1997–1999, Secretary of State for Defence 1997–1999, Secretary General of NATO 1999–2004, and life peer. His son Malcolm married John and Elizabeth's second daughter Jane.

== Springs and Spring Rices ==
- Sir Henry Spring (died before 1311), Knight of the Shire for Northumberland
- John Spring (died 1435), MP for Northampton (1414, 1416 and 1426)
- William Spring of Lavenham (died 1599), High Sheriff of Suffolk (1578 and 1579), MP for Suffolk (1570).
  - William Spring of Pakenham (died 1637), High Sheriff and MP for Suffolk. Grandson of William.
    - Sir William Spring, 1st Baronet of Pakenham (1613–1654), MP for Bury St Edmunds (1646–8) and Suffolk (1654), High Sheriff of Suffolk (1641). Son of William.
      - Sir William Spring, 2nd Baronet (1642–1684), MP for Suffolk (1679–1684), exclusionist and early Whig, son of the 1st Baronet
      - Sir Christopher Calthorpe (1645–1718), MP for Norfolk (1679), son-in-law of the 1st Baronet
  - Thomas Spring of Castlemaine (died 1597), High Sheriff of Kerry (1592). Uncle of William through his brother Thomas.
    - Thomas Spring Rice, 1st Baron Monteagle of Brandon (1790–1866), Whig politician, MP for Limerick City (1820–32), MP for Cambridge (1832–39), Secretary of State for War and the Colonies (1834), Chancellor of the Exchequer (1835–39), great-great-grandson of Thomas Spring of Castlemaine
      - Sir Stephen de Vere, 4th Baronet (1812–1904), MP for County Limerick (1854–1859), High Sheriff of County Limerick (1870), nephew of the 1st Baron
      - Thomas Spring Rice, 2nd Baron Monteagle of Brandon (1849–1926), politician, grandson of the 1st Baron
        - Thomas Spring Rice, 3rd Baron Monteagle of Brandon (1883–1934), diplomat, son of the 2nd Baron
      - Francis Spring Rice, 4th Baron Monteagle of Brandon (1852–1937), Conservative peer, younger son of the 3rd Baron
        - Charles Spring Rice, 5th Baron Monteagle of Brandon (1887–1946), Conservative peer, son of the 4th Baron
          - Gerald Spring Rice, 6th Baron Monteagle of Brandon (1926–2013), Conservative peer, son of the 5th Baron
          - William Brownlow (1921–1998), Unionist politician, MP for North Down (1959–62), brother-in-law of the 6th Baron
      - Sir Cecil Spring Rice (1859–1918), British Ambassador to the United States (1912–1918), grandson of 1st Baron Monteagle of Brandon
- Sir Francis Spring (1849–1933), British colonial civil servant and politician, Member of the Madras Legislative Council
- Sir Thomas Spring (1822–1905), Unionist politician, High Sheriff of Tipperary (1890)
  - Richard Spring, Baron Risby (born 1946), Conservative MP for Bury St Edmunds (1983–1997) and West Suffolk (1997–2010), Trade Envoy to Algeria (2012–present), Conservative peer, great-grandson of Sir Thomas Spring

== Stanleys (Earls of Derby) ==
- Edward Smith-Stanley, 12th Earl of Derby, politician
  - Edward Stanley, 13th Earl of Derby, politician, son of Edward, 12th Earl
    - Edward Smith-Stanley, 14th Earl of Derby, Prime Minister; son of Edward, 13th Earl
      - Edward Stanley, 15th Earl of Derby, politician; son of Edward, 14th Earl
      - Frederick Stanley, 16th Earl of Derby, politician, son of Edward, 14th Earl
        - Edward Stanley, 17th Earl of Derby, politician, son of Frederick
          - Edward Stanley, Lord Stanley, politician, son of Edward, 17th Earl
          - Oliver Stanley, politician, son of Edward, 17th Earl
        - George Frederick Stanley, politician; son of Frederick

== Stanleys (Baron Stanley of Alderley) ==
- John Stanley, 1st Baron Stanley of Alderley, MP for Wootton Bassett 1790–1796, peer
  - Edward John Stanley, MP for Hindon 1831–1832 and North Cheshire 1832–1841 1847–1848, Postmaster General of the United Kingdom 1860–1866, peer
    - Henry Stanley, 3rd Baron Stanley of Alderley, son of Edward, Lord Temporal
    - Edward Stanley, 4th Baron Stanley of Alderley, son of Edward, Lord Temporal
      - Arthur Stanley, 5th Baron Stanley of Alderley, son of Edward, MP for Eddisbury 1906–1910, Governor of Victoria 1914–1920, Lord Temporal
        - Edward Stanley, 6th Baron Stanley of Alderley, son of Arthur, Lord Temporal
          - Anthony Ashley-Cooper, 10th Earl of Shaftesbury, stepson of Edward, peer
        - Lyulph Stanley, 7th Baron Stanley of Alderley, son of Arthur, removed peer
      - Sir Lowthian Bell, 1st Baronet, father-in-law of Edward, MP for North Durham 1874, The Hartlepools 1875–1880
      - Edwin Montagu, son-in-law of Edward, MP for Chesterton 1906–1918, Cambridgeshire 1918–1922
      - Thomas Stanley, 8th Baron Sheffield, grandson of 4th Baron Sheffield, peer
    - David Ogilvy, 10th Earl of Airlie, son-in-law of Edward, representative peer
  - William Owen Stanley, son of John, MP for Anglesey 1837–1847, City of Chester 1850–1857, and Beaumaris 1857–1874

== Sturgeon ==
- Nicola Sturgeon (1970–), Scottish National Party (SNP) MSP for Glasgow 1999–2007, Glasgow Govan 2007–2011, and Glasgow Southside since 2011. Deputy Leader of the SNP 2004–2014, Deputy First Minister of Scotland 2007–2014, First Minister of Scotland & Leader of the Scottish National Party 2014–2023.
  - Peter Murrell (1964–), estranged spouse of the above. Chief Executive of the Scottish National Party 2001–2023.

== St Leger ==
- Hayes St Leger, 4th Viscount Doneraile, Irish representative peer 1855–1887
  - George Lenox-Conyngham, father-in-law of Hayes,
    - William Fitzwilliam Lenox-Conyngham, first cousin twice removed of George, High Sheriff of County Tyrone

== Summerskills ==
- Edith Summerskill, MP for Fulham West 1938–55 and Warrington 1955–61.
  - Shirley Summerskill, MP for Halifax 1964–1983. Daughter of Edith.
  - John Ryman, MP for Blyth 1974–1983 and Blyth Valley 1983–1987. Spouse of Shirley.

== Swanns ==
- Sir Charles Swann, 1st Baronet, MP 1886–1918
  - Duncan Swann, MP 1906–10. Son of Duncan.

== Swinson and Hames ==
- Jo Swinson, MP for East Dunbartonshire 2005–15 and 2017–19 and former leader of the Liberal Democrats.
  - Duncan Hames, MP for Chippenham 2010–15. Spouse of the above.

== Tennyson (d'Eyncourt) ==
- George Tennyson, MP 1818–1819
  - Charles Tennyson-d'Eyncourt, MP 1818–1852. Son of George.

== Todds ==
- Alfred Todd, Conservative MP 1929–35
  - Mark Todd, Labour MP 1997–. Grandson of Alfred.

== Tugendhats ==
- Christopher Tugendhat, Baron Tugendhat (1937–), Conservative MP 1970–1977.
- Michael Tugendhat (1944–), High Court judge. Brother of Christopher.
  - Tom Tugendhat (1973–), Conservative MP 2015–.

== Tyrwhitt-Drakes ==
- Thomas Drake Tyrwhitt-Drake, MP 1801–10
  - Thomas Tyrwhitt-Drake, MP 1805–32. Son of Thomas.

== Vane-Tempest-Stewart ==
- Charles Vane-Tempest-Stewart, 7th Marquess of Londonderry (1878–1949), MP 1906–1915 and peer.
  - Robin Vane-Tempest-Stewart, 8th Marquess of Londonderry (1902–1955), MP 1931–1945 and peer. Son of Charles.

== Vaz ==
- Merlyn Verona Vaz, Leicester City Councillor.
  - Valerie Vaz (1954–), MP for Walsall South 2010–. Daughter of Merlyn and sister of Keith
  - Keith Vaz (1956–), MP for Leicester East 1987–2019 . Son of Merlyn and brother of Valerie.

== Villiers (Earl of Clarendon) ==
- George Villiers, MP for Warwick 1792–1802
  - George Villiers, 4th Earl of Clarendon, first son of George, Liberal peer
  - Thomas Hyde Villiers, second son of George, MP for Hedon 1826–1830, Wootton Bassett 1830–1831, Bletchingley 1831–1832
  - Charles Pelham Villiers, third son of George, MP for Wolverhampton 1835–1885 and Wolverhampton South 1885–1898

== Vivians ==
- Hussey Vivian, 1st Baron Vivian, MP 1820–41 and peer.
  - Charles Vivian, 2nd Baron Vivian, MP 1835–42 and peer.

== Wakefields ==
- Edward Wakefield, MP for West Derbyshire (1950–1962)
- Wavell Wakefield, 1st Baron Wakefield of Kendal, MP for Swindon (1935–1945) and St Marylebone (1945–1963). Brother of the above.

== Walkers ==
- Peter Walker, Baron Walker of Worcester (1932–2010), Conservative MP 1961–1992.
  - Robin Walker (1978–), Conservative MP 2010–. Son of Peter.

== Ward, Seabeck, Raynsford ==
- Michael Ward MP
  - Alison Seabeck, MP for Plymouth Devonport 2005–2010 and Plymouth Moor View 2010–2015. Daughter of Michael.
    - Nick Raynsford, MP for Fulham 1986–1987, Greenwich 1992–1997 and Greenwich & Woolwich 1997–2015. Spouse of Alison

== Watkins ==
- Sir Edward Watkin, MP 1857–95
  - Alfred Mellor Watkin, MP 1877–80. Son of Edward.

== Watts ==
- Hamish Watt (1925–2014), SNP MP 1974–1979.
  - Maureen Watt (1951–), SNP MSP 2006–2011 2011. Daughter of Hamish.
    - Stuart Donaldson, SNP MP 2015–17. Son of Maureen.

== Whitbreads ==
- Samuel Whitbread, MP 1852–95
  - Samuel Howard Whitbread, MP 1892–1910. Son of Samuel.

== Wheatleys ==
- John Wheatley, MP 1922–30, Minister of Health 1924.
  - John Wheatley, Baron Wheatley, MP 1947–54, Solicitor General for Scotland 1947, Lord Advocate 1947–51, Labour Life Peer. Nephew of John.
    - John Wheatley, Lord Wheatley, Senator of the College of Justice 2000–11. Son of John.

== Whites (Baron Annaly) ==
- Luke White (died 1824), MP 1812–24.
  - Samuel White (died 1854), MP 1824–47. Second son of Luke.
  - Henry White, 1st Baron Annaly (1791–1873), MP 1823–61 and peer. Fourth son of Luke.
    - Luke White, 2nd Baron Annaly (1829–1888), MP 1859–65 and peer. Son of Henry.
      - Luke White, 3rd Baron Annaly (1857–1922), Longford DL and peer. Son of Luke.
        - Luke White, 4th Baron Annaly (1885–1970), peer. Son of Luke.
          - Luke White, 5th Baron Annaly (1927–1990), peer. Son of Luke.
            - Luke White, 6th Baron Annaly (born 1954), Lord-in-Waiting and Conservative Cherwell District Councillor 2007–11. Son of Luke.

== Wiggins ==
- Jerry Wiggin (1937–2015), Conservative MP 1969–1997.
  - Bill Wiggin (1966–), Conservative MP 2001–. Son of Jerry.

== Wigrams ==
- Sir Robert Wigram, 1st Baronet, MP 1802–07
  - Sir Robert Wigram, 2nd Baronet, MP 1806–30. Son of Robert.

== Williamses ==
- Robert Williams (1735–1814), MP 1807–12
  - Robert Williams (1767–1847), MP 1802–34. Son of Robert.

== Williams and Breeses ==
- David Williams (1799–1869), Liberal MP 1868–1869.
  - Sir Osmond Williams, 1st Baronet (1849–1927), Liberal MP 1900–1910. Son of David.
  - Charles Edward Breese (1867–1932), Liberal MP 1918–1922. Great-nephew of David.

== Wintertons ==
- Nicholas Winterton MP for Macclesfield 1971–2010.
  - Ann Winterton, MP for Congleton 1983–2010. Spouse of the above.

== Wintringhams ==
- Thomas Wintringham, MP for Louth 1920–1921
  - Margaret Wintringham, MP for Louth 1921–1924. Spouse of the above.

== Wolfsons ==
- Leonard Wolfson, Baron Wolfson, Conservative life peer
- David Wolfson, Baron Wolfson of Sunningdale, Conservative life peer; cousin of Leonard
  - Simon Wolfson, Conservative life peer; son of David.
- Patricia Rawlings, Baroness Rawlings, Conservative politician; first spouse of David

== Woods ==
- Sir Mark Wood, 1st Baronet, MP 1801–18
  - Sir Mark Wood, 2nd Baronet, MP 1816–18. Son of Mark.

== Yousaf ==
- Humza Yousaf (1985–), Scottish National Party MSP for Glasgow 2011–2016 & Glasgow Pollok since 2016. Leader of the Scottish National Party and First Minister of Scotland from 2023 to 2024.
  - Nadia El-Nakla (1984–), spouse of the above. SNP Councillor of Dundee City Council for West End Ward 3 since 2022.
