= Robert Blennerhassett =

Robert Blennerhassett may refer to:

- Robert Blennerhassett (1652–1712), Anglo-Irish lawyer and MP
- Robert Blennerhassett (MP for Tralee) (c. 1622–c. 1689), Anglo-Irish soldier and MP
