= John Blennerhassett (died 1677) =

John Blennerhassett (died 4 December 1677) was an Anglo-Irish member of the Irish House of Commons.

Blennerhassett was the son of Captain John Blennerhassett and Martha Lynn. He was probably born at Ballycarty Castle, County Kerry, where his family owned a large estate. He was the brother of Robert Blennerhassett.

He served as High Sheriff of Kerry in 1658. He was elected as Member of Parliament for Tralee in 1661. He married Elizabeth Denny in 1654, with whom he had three children, including the MP John Blennerhassett.

== Ancestry ==
Ancestors of John Blennerhassett (died 1677)

16. John Blennerhassett
8. Thomas Blennerhassett
17. Janet (Joan) de Martindale
4. Robert Blennerhassett
2. John Blennerhassett
20. Henry Conway
10. Capt. Jenkin Conway of Castle Conway
21. Grace Dry
5. Elizabeth Conway
22. Sir William Herbert, of Colebrooke
11. Mary Herbert
1. John Blennerhassett
24. George Lynne of Southwick Hall, Northamptonshire
12. George Lynne
25. Amelia Montague (dau. of Sir Edward Montague)
6. George Lynne
26. Clement Throckmorton
13. Martha Throckmorton
27. Catherine Neville (dau. of Edward Neville)
3. Martha Lynne
28. Robert Forrest of Morborne, Huntingdonshire
14. Sir Myles Forrest
7. Isabella Forrest
30. Anthony Colly, MP
15. Elizabeth Colly
