= Blennerhassett family =

Arms of Blennerhassett. Described as Gules, a chevron ermine, between three dolphins naiant embowed Argent

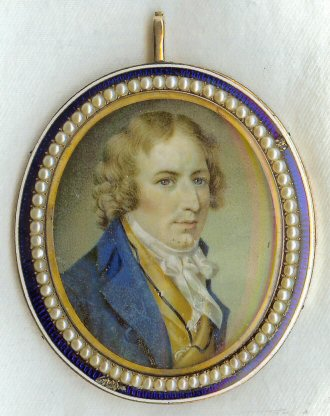
Harmon Blennerhassett

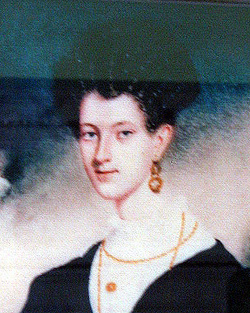
Margaret [Agnew] Blennerhassett

The Blennerhassett family is an English and Anglo-Irish noble family which has been involved in the politics of the Britain and Ireland since the fourteenth century. The male line of the family is extinct in Britain.

== History ==
The family is recorded as having originally been settled in Cumberland in northern England, at the manor of Blennerhasset. The landowner John de Blennerhassett sat in the House of Commons of England as the Member of Parliament for Carlisle in 1381 and 1384, and his descendants represented the seat in almost every Parliament from the reign of Richard II to the reign of James I. In 1390 Alan de Blenerhayset secured a grant of arms from the Crown. In 1547 the Blennerhassett family relocated to Frenze, Norfolk and Barsham, Suffolk on former monastery lands.

In the reign of Elizabeth I the senior branch of the family under Robert Blennerhassett (accompanied by his elderly father Thomas) settled in County Kerry, Ireland, during the Plantation of Munster. The family established themselves as part of the Anglo-Irish gentry, and under the Act of Settlement 1662 were granted 2,787 acres in County Kerry and 2,039 acres in County Cork. The marriage of Robert Blennerhassett to Avice Conway, the daughter and heiress of Edward Conway, brought the Blennerhassetts into the possession of Castle Conway in Killorglin, which would subsequently become the manor of the Blennerhassetts' 7,000-acre Kerry estate. Numerous Blennerhassetts sat in the Irish House of Commons for the constituencies of Tralee and County Kerry, which were controlled by the family, and several also served as High Sheriff of Kerry. Sir John Blennerhassett (1560-1624) served as Chief Baron of the Irish Exchequer. Many members of the family married into other Kerry dynasties such as the Conways, Dennys, Crosbies, Fitzmaurices, MacCarthys, O'Connells, Sealys, Springs and Mullins. Indeed, the grandmother of Mary O'Connell from Tralee, who married Daniel O'Connell MP, was Jane Blennerhasset, a granddaughter of Robert Blennerhasset MP, of Castle Conway.

In 1809, Rowland Blennerhassett, a lawyer and politician, was created a baronet in the Baronetage of the United Kingdom. Sir Rowland renamed the estate village Blennerville in his family's honour. His relation Harman Blennerhassett settled in the United States in 1796, where Blennerhassett Island and Blennerhassett, West Virginia are named after the family.

The Irish politician John Blennerhassett (1930–2013) is the most recent member of the family to be involved in politics.
