= James Johnston Clark =

James Johnston Clark (1809 – June 1891) was a Unionist politician in Ireland.

Clark was born the son of Alexander and Margaret (née Johnston) Clark of Maghera. He inherited Largantogher House, Maghera, County Londonderry on the death of his father in 1842 and was appointed High Sheriff of County Londonderry for 1849.

He served as a Unionist Member of Parliament for County Londonderry from 9 March 1857 until 1859. He was a member of the Carlton Club, London.

He married Frances, the daughter of Robert Hall of Merton Hall, Tipperary. His son, Sir William Ovens Clark, was Chief Justice of Punjab Chief Court. Clark's grandson was James Lenox-Conyngham Chichester-Clark and his great-grandson was Prime Minister of Northern Ireland, Lord Moyola. He was the father-in-law of John Kells Ingram.

== Arms ==
Coat of arms of James Johnston Clark

Notes
Confirmed 7 January 1861 by Sir John Bernard Burke, Ulster King of Arms.
Crest
Out of a mural crown an arm embowed in armour the hand holding a dagger all Proper the arm charged with a trefoil Vert.
Escutcheon
Gules three swords erect in pale Proper hilts and pommels Or a canton Argent charged with a trefoil Vert.
Motto
Virtute Et Labore

Parliament of the United Kingdom
Preceded by Theobald Jones; Thomas Bateson	Member of Parliament for Londonderry; 1857 – 1859; With: Theobald Jones Mar – Apr 1857; Samuel Macurdy Greer 1857–1859	Succeeded by Robert Peel Dawson; Sir Frederick Heygate, 2nd Bt
