= William Ovens Clark =

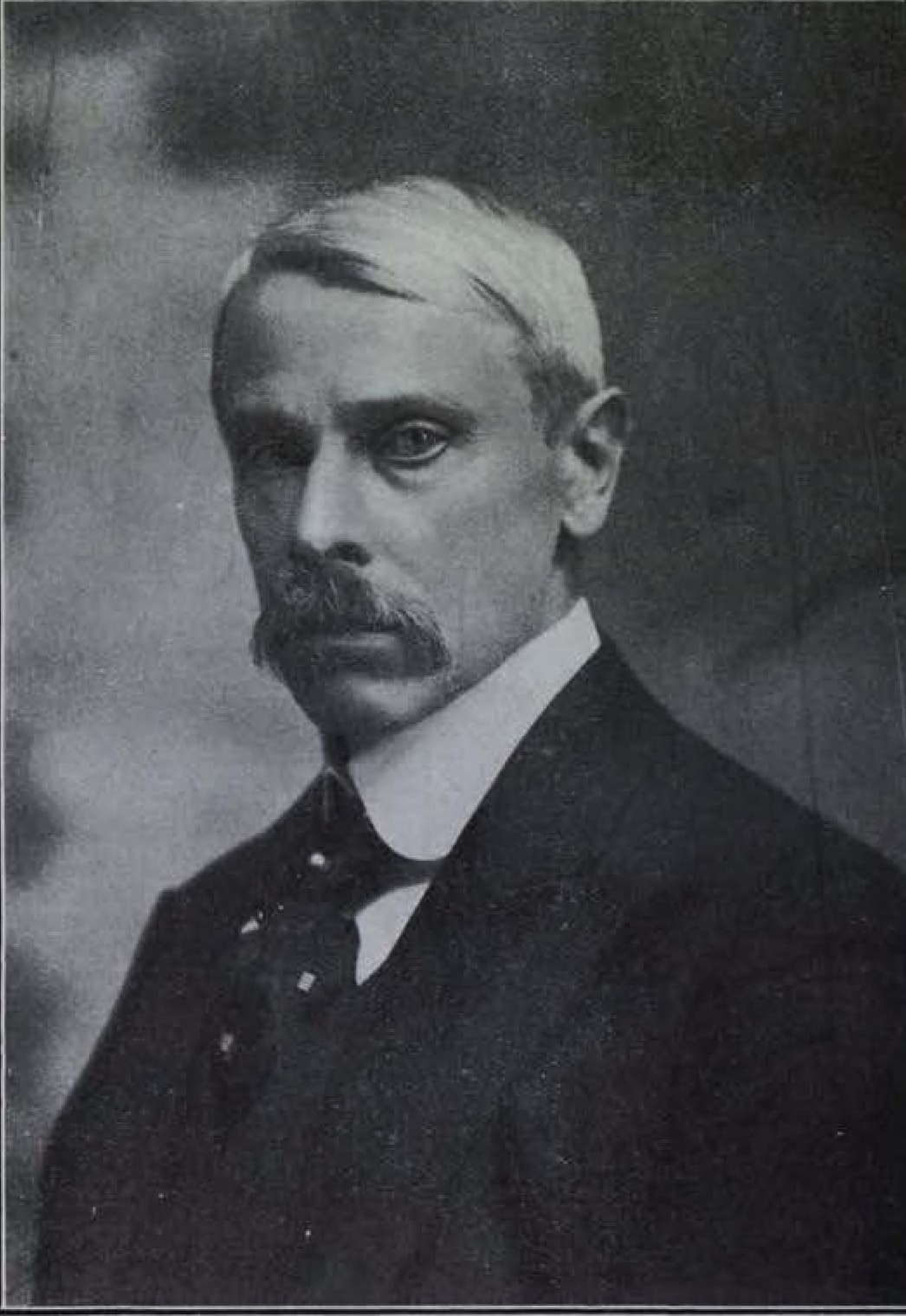
- Born: 14 January 1849; Ireland
- Died: 3 April 1937 (aged 88); London, England
- Education: Portora Royal School; Trinity College Dublin
- Occupation: Jurist
- Father: James Johnston Clark

Sir William Ovens Clark (14 January 1849 – 3 April 1937) was a barrister and judge in British India. He served as the Chief Justice of the Chief Court of the Punjab.

== Biography ==
He was born in Ireland, the son of James Johnston Clark and Frances Hall. He was educated at Portora Royal School and Trinity College Dublin.

He joined in the Indian Civil Service in 1869 and arrived in India in 1871. On arrival he worked as assistant to the commissioner in the Punjab. He provided assistance during the Bengal famine of 1874.

Clark qualified as a Barrister-at-Law in 1881. Between 1894 and 1895, he served a Divisional Judge at Peshawar, and, in 1896, at Delhi. That latter year he was also made a Divisional Judge at Lahore, and in 1897 made a full Judge at the Chief Court of the Punjab. In December 1898, he was appointed Chief Justice of the Chief Court of the Punjab.

He was made a Knight Bachelor in the 1903 Durbar Honours. He retired as Chief Justice in 1910 and settled in London. Clark died in London in 1937 at the age of 88.
