= Castle Conway =

Former castle in County Kerry, Ireland

Coordinates: 52.106°N 9.785°W

Castle Conway is a former castle and stately home in the town of Killorglin, County Kerry, Ireland. Today only the ruins of one wall remain.

== History ==
Originally called Killorglin Castle, a defensive structure was first built on the site next to the River Laune by Maurice FitzGerald, 2nd Lord of Offaly. Following the Desmond Rebellions, the castle was seized by the Crown and subsequently granted to Captain Jenkin Conway in 1587 as part of the Munster Plantation. The Conway family were Welsh in origin and through the wife of Jenkin Conway, Mary Herbert, descendants of Henry I and Aoife MacMurrough through her ancestor Sir Richard Herbert of Coldbrook. This grant was confirmed in 1592. Due to the poor state of the building, the son of Captain Jenkin Conway, also Jenkin, rebuilt the castle in 1613 and named it Castle Conway. The castle passed in marriage to Robert Blennerhassett, a Cromwellian officer in the Irish Confederate Wars. During the wars, the castle had been damaged and it was in ruins by 1682.

Between 1700 and 1710, a new stately home was built by the Blennerhassett family on the site of the ruined castle, including elements of the medieval structure. By this stage, the family estate surrounding the castle was approximately 7,000 acres, and the Blennerhassetts were able to build a large new house, recorded as having tall chimneys, an important library and demesne terraced gardens leading down to the River Laune. The old chapel was repaired and incorporated into the new building. Castle Conway was inherited by Harman Blennerhassett in 1792, but was sold to his relation, Thomas Mullins, 1st Baron Ventry in 1795. The castle had been largely demolished by 1842, with much of its stone being used in the construction of other Killorglin buildings. The stone ruins of one of the medieval walls are all that remain of the castle.

== Ancestry of Conway of Kerry ==
Ancestry of Conway of Kerry

16. John Conway
8. Pierce Conway
17. Jane Stanley
4. Henry Conway
18. Jenkin
9. Jane
2. Captain Jenkin Conway
5. Grace Dry
1. Elizabeth, Jenkin, Alice Conway
24. Sir Richard Herbert of Coldbrook
12. Sir William Herbert, of Colebrooke
25. Margaret Nicholas (dau. of Sir Thomas Griffith Nicholas)
6. Sir William Herbert, of Colebrooke
3. Mary Herbert
