= John de Blennerhassett =

Member of the Parliament of England

John de Blennerhassett (1350–1384) was an English politician and ancestor of the Blennerhassett family.

John was the son of Alan de Blenerhayset. He held the office of member of parliament for Carlisle in the House of Commons of England in 1381 and 1384. He was appointed to the office of Commissioner in 1384.

He married Joanna, and together they are recorded as having had two sons: Richard and Ralph.
