= Robert Blennerhassett (High Sheriff) =

Blennerhassett Coat of Arms

Robert Blennerhassett (c. 1622 – c. 1689) was an Anglo-Irish soldier.

He was the son of Captain John Blennerhassett and Martha Lynn. He was probably born at the family estate at Ballycarty Castle, County Kerry. The Blennerhassett family was originally from Cumberland. Robert's grandfather Robert Blennerhassett (who accompanied his elderly father Thomas) settled in Kerry in the reign of Elizabeth I as part of the Munster Plantations. He was the brother of John Blennerhassett MP.

Blennerhassett served as an officer in the Cromwellian army during the Irish Confederate Wars, ensuring that his lands remained intact. He was granted a full pardon following the Restoration of the Monarchy. Blennerhassett served as High Sheriff of Kerry in 1682.

== Family ==
Blennerhassett married his second cousin (through Jenkin Conway) Avice Conway, the daughter and heiress of Edward Conway. In doing so he came into the possession of Castle Conway in Killorglin, which would subsequently become the manor of the Blennerhassett's 7,000 acre Kerry estate. He had eleven children with Avice Conway. He was the grandfather of Conway Blennerhassett, the great-grandfather of William Spring and Sir Rowland Blennerhassett, 1st Baronet and the great-great-grandfather of Harman Blennerhassett. His wife drowned at sea in 1683, and the last recording of Robert Blennerhassett is in 1689.
