= Smith family (bankers) =

English banking family

Arms of Smith of Nottingham: Or, a chevron cotised sable between three demi-griffins couped of the last the two in chief respecting each other. Granted in 1717 to Thomas Smith II (1682-1728), of Nottingham, of Broxtowe, Nottinghamshire and of Gaddesby in Leicestershire, during his term as Sheriff of Leicestershire (1717–18), eldest son of Thomas Smith I who founded the bank in 1658. The arms were granted to him and to all male descendants of his father

The Smith family is an English aristocratic and banking family founded by Thomas Smith (1631–1699), the founder of Smith's Bank of Nottingham. Its members include the Marquess of Lincolnshire (extinct), the Viscount Wendover (extinct), the Barons Carrington, the Baron Pauncefote (extinct), the Barons Bicester, the Bromley baronets and many Members of Parliament. Originally named Smith, the branch of the Barons Carrington assumed the surname Carington, the branch of the Bromley baronets the surname Bromley and the branch of the Baron Pauncefote the surname Pauncefote.

== Family tree ==
- Thomas Smith I (1631–1699)
  - Thomas Smith II (c. 1682 – 1727/28)
  - Abel Smith I (1686–1756)
    - Sir George Smith, 1st Baronet, of East Stoke (1713–1769)
      - Sir George Pauncefote-Bromley, 2nd Baronet, of East Stoke (1753–1808)
        - Sir Robert Howe Bromley, 3rd Baronet, of East Stoke (1778–1857)
          - Robert Bromley (1815–1850)
          - Sir Henry Bromley, 4th Baronet, of East Stoke (1816–1895)
            - Sir Henry Bromley, 5th Baronet, of East Stoke (1849–1905)
              - Sir Robert Bromley, 6th Baronet, of East Stoke (1874–1906)
              - Sir Maurice Bromley-Wilson, 7th Baronet, of East Stoke (1875–1957)
              - Sir Arthur Bromley, 8th Baronet, of East Stoke (1876–1961)
                - Sir Rupert Howe Bromley, 9th Baronet, of East Stoke (1910–1966)
                  - Sir Rupert Charles Bromley, 10th Baronet, of East Stoke (born 1936)
                    - Charles Howard Bromley (born 1963), heir apparent
                      - Robert Charles Bromley (born 1999)
    - John Smith (1716– )
      - Thomas Smith ( – )
        - Robert Pauncefote (c. 1788 – 1843)
          - Julian Pauncefote, 1st Baron Pauncefote (1828–1902)
    - Abel Smith II (1717–1788)
      - Thomas Smith
      - Abel Smith (1748–1779)
      - Robert Smith, 1st Baron Carrington (1752–1838)
        - Robert Carrington, 2nd Baron Carrington (1796–1868)
          - Charles Wynn-Carington, 1st Marquess of Lincolnshire (1843–1928)
            - Albert Wynn-Carington, Viscount Wendover (1895–1915)
          - Sir William Carington (1845–1914)
          - Rupert Carington, 4th Baron Carrington (1852–1929)
            - Rupert Carington, 5th Baron Carrington (1891–1938)
              - Peter Carington, 6th Baron Carrington (1919–2018)
                - Rupert Carington, 7th Baron Carrington (born 1948)
                  - Hon. Robert Carington (born 1990), heir apparent
      - Samuel Smith (1754–1834)
        - Abel Smith (1788–1859)
          - Abel Smith (1829–1898)
            - Abel Henry Smith (1862–1930)
          - Robert Smith (1833–1894)
            - Reginald Abel Smith (1858–1902)
            - Eustace Abel Smith (1862–1938)
              - Vice-Admiral Sir Conolly Abel Smith (1899–1985)
            - Wilfrid Robert Abel Smith (1870–1915)
              - Wilfrid Lyulph Abel Smith (1905–1988)
                - Robert Ralph Abel Smith (born 1947)
                  - Edward Lyulph Abel Smith, later Ned Rocknroll (born 1978)
                    - Bear Blaze Winslet (born 2013)
            - Bertram Smith (1879– )
          - Albert Smith (1841–1914)
            - Lionel Abel-Smith (1870–1946)
              - Brian Abel-Smith (1926–1996)
        - Samuel George Smith (1789–1863)
          - Samuel George Smith (1822–1900)
          - Frederick Chatfield Smith (1823–1905)
            - Herbert Francis Smith (1859– )
          - Rowland Smith (1824–1901)
          - Horace James Smith-Bosanquet (1826– )
        - Henry Smith (1794–1874)
          - Henry Abel Smith (1826–1890)
            - Francis Abel Smith (1861–1908)
              - Sir Henry Abel Smith (1900–1993)
                - Anne Abel Smith (born 1932)
                - Richard Abel Smith (1933–2004)
                  - Katherine Emma Abel Smith (born 1961)
                - Elizabeth Alice Abel Smith (born 1936)
              - Sir Alexander Abel Smith (1904–1980)
      - George Smith (1765–1836)
        - George Robert Smith (1793–1869)
          - Ernald Mosley Smith (1839–1872)
        - Oswald Smith (1794–1863)
          - Oswald Augustus Smith (1826–1902)
            - Basil Guy Oswald Smith (1861–1928)
          - Eric Carrington Smith (1828–1906)
            - Lindsay Smith (1852–1930)
              - Evan Smith (1894–1950)
                - Fortune Smith (born 1920)
                - Sir John Smith (1923–2007)
                - Jeremy Fox Eric Smith (born 1928)
                  - Dione Angela Smith (born 1954)
          - Frances Dora Smith (1832–1922)
        - John Henry Smith (1795–1887)
        - Alfred Smith (1815–1886)
      - John Smith (1767–1842)
        - John Abel Smith (1802–1871)
          - Jervoise Smith (1828–1884)
          - Dudley Robert Smith (1830–1897)
            - Gerald Dudley Smith (1866– )
            - Aylwyn Dudley Smith (1868–1938)
          - Hugh Colin Smith (1836–1910)
            - Mildred Anne Smith (c. 1866 – 1955)
            - Vivian Smith, 1st Baron Bicester (1867–1956)
              - Randal Smith, 2nd Baron Bicester (1898–1968)
              - Hon. Stephen Edward Vivian Smith (1903–1952)
                - Angus Edward Vivian Smith, 3rd Baron Bicester (1932–2014)
                - Hugh Charles Vivian Smith, 4th Baron Bicester (1934–2016)
              - Hon. Hugh Adeane Vivian Smith (1910–1978)
                - George Harry Vivian Smith (1934–2012)
                  - Charles James Vivian Smith, 5th Baron Bicester (born 1963)
                    - Milo Louis Vivian Smith (born 2007), heir apparent
            - Admiral Sir Aubrey Smith (1872–1957)
        - Martin Tucker Smith (1803–1880)
          - Martin Ridley Smith (1833– )
            - Nigel Martin Smith (1866– )
          - Sir Gerard Smith (1839–1920)
            - Gerald Hamilton Smith (1876– )
        - Caroline Leigh Smith (1813–1883)
  - Samuel Smith (c. 1688–1751)
    - Samuel Smith (1722–1789)
      - Samuel Smith (1755–1793)
      - James Smith (1768–1843)
        - Augustus Smith (1804–1872)
        - Robert Algernon Smith-Dorrien (1814–1879)
          - Thomas Algernon Smith-Dorrien-Smith (1846–1918)
            - Major Arthur Algernon Dorrien-Smith (1876–1955), married Eleanor Salvin Bowlby
              - Captain Algernon Robert Augustus Dorrien-Smith (1910–1940) married Rosemarie Helen Lucas-Tooth
              - Anne Elizabeth Dorrien-Smith (born 1911), married Claud Phillimore, 4th Baron Phillimore
              - Thomas Mervyn Smith-Dorrien-Smith (1913–1973)
              - Lieutenant-Commander Thomas Mervyn Dorrien-Smith RN (1913–1973), married (1) Princess Tamar Bagration-Imeretinsky, (2) Margaret Claire Hugh-Jones
                - Teona Judith Dorrien-Smith (born 1946)
                - Alexandra Innis Mary Dorrien-Smith (1948–2007)
                - Robert Arthur Dorrien-Smith (born 1951)
                - Charlotte Sophia Dorrien-Smith (1954–1997)
                - James Augustus Bagration Dorrien-Smith (born 1957)
              - Innis Mary Dorrien-Smith (born 1916), married William Somers Llewellyn
              - Pilot Officer Lionel Roger Dorrien-Smith RAF (1918–1940)
              - Major Francis Arthur Dorrien-Smith (1921–1944)
              - Helen Dorrien-Smith (born 1932)
          - Arthur Hale Smith-Dorrien (1856–1933)
          - General Sir Horace Smith-Dorrien (1858–1930)
            - Brigadier Grenfell Horace Gerald Smith-Dorrien (1904–1944)
            - Colonel Peter Lockwood Smith-Dorrien (born 1907–1946)
            - Major Bromley David Smith-Dorrien (1911–2001)

== Bibliography ==
- Harry Tucker Easton: The History of a Banking House (Smith, Payne and Smiths), London 1903. (Link: https://archive.org/details/historyofbanking00east)
- J. Leighton Boyce, Smith's the Bankers 1658–1958, 1958.
- Leonard Jacks, Bramcote Hall - The Smiths: The Great houses of Nottinghamshire and the County Families, 1881
