= Dashwood baronets of West Wycombe (1707) =

Escutcheon of the Dashwood baronets of West Wycombe

The Dashwood baronetcy, of West Wycombe in the County of Buckingham, was created in the Baronetage of Great Britain on 28 June 1707 for Francis Dashwood, a merchant and subsequently Member of Parliament for Winchelsea. He was the son of Alderman Francis Dashwood, a brother of George Dashwood the father of the 1st Baronet of the Dashwood baronets of Kirtlington Park (1684); he married, firstly, Lady Mary, daughter of Vere Fane, 4th Earl of Westmorland.

The 1st Baronet was succeeded by his son from his first marriage, the 2nd Baronet, a prominent politician and Chancellor of the Exchequer from 1762 to 1763, notorious as founder of the Hellfire Club. In 1762 he succeeded his maternal uncle as 11th Baron Le Despencer. On his death without male issue in 1781 the Le Despencer barony fell into abeyance. The baronetcy was inherited by his half-brother, John, the 3rd Baronet, who assumed the additional surname of King.

The Dashwood baronetcy of West Wycombe is the premier baronetcy in the Baronetage of Great Britain. The family seat is West Wycombe Park.

== Dashwood, later Dashwood-King, later Dashwood baronets, of West Wycombe (1707) ==
- Sir Francis Dashwood, 1st Baronet (c. 1658 – 4 November 1724) was a London merchant who made his fortune trading with the Far East. Francis used part of his wealth to buy the estate of West Wycombe Park, Buckinghamshire, and was created a baronet in 1707.
- Sir Francis Dashwood, 2nd Baronet, 11th Baron Le Despencer (December 1708 – 11 December 1781), was an English rake famous as the founder of the Hellfire Club. He succeeded to the baronetcy in 1724. The height of his political career was his service as Chancellor of the Exchequer under Lord Bute. After leaving that post, the Barony of le Despencer was called out of abeyance for him (in right of his mother). However, he died in 1781 and was succeeded in the baronetcy by his half-brother John.
- Sir John Dashwood-King, 3rd Baronet (4 August 1716 – 6 December 1793) was an English landowner. He was the second son of Sir Francis Dashwood, 1st Baronet, but the eldest by his third wife, and inherited lands in Lincolnshire and Wales from his maternal uncles, whose surname he adopted. John's interests lay largely in these lands, even after inheriting West Wycombe and the baronetcy in 1781.
- Sir John Dashwood-King, 4th Baronet (1765 – 22 October 1849) was an English landowner, who succeeded his father in the baronetcy and inherited West Wycombe in 1793. Returned as Member of Parliament for Wycombe in 1796, he held that seat as a Tory until 1831. Bitterly opposed to electoral reform, he declined to contest the seat thereafter. Due to over-investment in local land, he died impoverished and left a heavily indebted estate.
- Sir George Henry Dashwood, 5th Baronet (c. 1790 – 4 March 1862) was an English landowner and politician. A liberal Whig, he represented Buckinghamshire and subsequently Wycombe, as had his father Sir John. He liquidated his grandfather's estates in Lincolnshire and Wales in 1851, and used the money so raised to overhaul the estate at West Wycombe. He was succeeded by his brother John upon his death in 1862.
- Sir John Richard Dashwood, 6th Baronet (c. 1792 – 24 September 1863), an English landowner, was the third son of Sir John Dashwood-King, 4th Baronet. He inherited the baronetcy from his brother in 1862, but died, unmarried and without issue, the following year.
- Sir Edwin Hare Dashwood, 7th Baronet (7 September 1825 – 8 May 1882), English soldier and landowner in New Zealand and England.
- Sir Edwin Abercromby Dashwood, 8th Baronet (28 October 1854 – 7 April 1893) was an English landowner. Born in New Zealand, he went to England with his father, Sir Edwin Dashwood, 7th Baronet, in 1859, but returned to New Zealand as a kauri gum buyer in 1874. On the death of his father, he inherited the baronetcy and the decaying West Wycombe estate, but did not return to England until after he had married Florence Norton in New Zealand on 24 August 1889. To welcome his return, a triumphal arch of chairs (the local industry was chairmaking) was constructed in West Wycombe village. The couple had one daughter, Florence Emily (11 August 1890 – 17 April 1969). He mortgaged the estate, but died suddenly in 1893.
- Sir Robert John Dashwood, 9th Baronet (3 June 1859 – 9 July 1908) was an English landowner. Born in New Zealand, the second son of Sir Edwin Dashwood, 7th Baronet, he returned to England in infancy. In 1893, he unexpectedly succeeded to West Wycombe and the baronetcy on the death of his brother. The estate was then in a ruinous state, and he was forced to sell off more property and lease the family's London house. He married Clara Adelaide Ida Conyers Lindsay (d. 20 April 1945) on 25 July 1893 and they had four sons (the eldest and youngest died in infancy) and one daughter. He died unexpectedly in 1908.
- Sir John Lindsay Dashwood, 10th Baronet (25 April 1896 – 9 July 1966) was an English landowner and soldier, the second son of Sir Robert Dashwood, 9th Baronet, whom he succeeded at the age of twelve. He served in the First World War, initially with 10th Battalion Argyll and Sutherland Highlanders in 1915, and then was attached to the Heavy Section Machine Gun Corps. He was one of the first tank crews, commanding tank C13 during the first tank action near Combles on 15 September 1916. He continued to serve with the Tank Corps, ending the war as an acting major. He married Helen Moira Eaton, a Canadian and sister of novelist Evelyn Eaton, on 20 December 1922 and they had one daughter and two sons. He worked for the Foreign Office until 1927. After a brief stint as a stockbroker, he largely retired to his West Wycombe estate in 1930, although he served as Assistant Marshal of the Diplomatic Corps from 1933 until his death. When World War II broke out, he first served as a flight lieutenant with Balloon Command, but returned to the Foreign Office in 1942. Appreciating the historical importance of the house at West Wycombe Park (the family seat), if not the house itself, he gave the property to the National Trust in 1943, together with an endowment of £2,000. In 1944, he helped to investigate the CICERO espionage scandal. Dashwood was made a CVO in 1952, and appointed an Extra Gentleman Usher to the Queen in 1958.
- Sir Francis John Vernon Hereward Dashwood, 11th Baronet (7 August 1925 – 9 March 2000), was an English landowner, known for his activities in restoring the family estate at West Wycombe. While at Eton he had carried off the top prizes in French and German, so, when he was rejected by the Grenadier Guards and other regiments because of his poor eyesight, he was assigned to the secret Bedford Japanese School run by Captain Oswald Tuck RN. He was on the 7th course there (March to September 1944) and came 3rd in the class. He was then sent to the Foreign Office decryption centre at Berkeley Street and later was posted to Mauritius as one of three Bedford graduates with both codebreaking and Japanese expertise. There he worked on intercepted Japanese signals until the end of the war. He briefly embarked upon a political career, contesting West Bromwich in 1955 and Gloucester in 1957 as a Conservative, but lost both times. On 3 May of that year, he married his first wife, the Welsh heiress Victoria Ann Elizabeth Gwynne de Rutzen (1933 – 26 June 1976), and they had three daughters and one son. He took over the management of West Wycombe from his father in 1963, and attempted to build a model village at Downley, but it proved financially unsuccessful. On 24 September 1977, he married his second wife, Marcella Teresa Scarafina (she had been married twice before). Through a variety of investments, Sir Francis was ultimately able to restore much of the estate and re-purchase many of the original furnishings before his death in 2000.
- Sir Edward John Francis Dashwood, 12th Baronet (born 25 September 1964) is an English landowner, the only son of Sir Francis Dashwood, 11th Baronet. On 10 April 1989, he married Lucinda Nell Miesegaes and they have one daughter and two sons. He is the current occupant of West Wycombe Park, now in the ownership of the National Trust, the maintenance of which is supported by opening to the public and leasing the estate as a venue for filmmaking and entertainment.

The heir apparent is the present holder's eldest son, George Francis Dashwood (born 17 June 1992).

Line of succession
- Sir John Dashwood, 10th Baronet (1896–1966)
  - Sir Francis Dashwood, 11th Baronet (1925–2000)
    - Sir Edward Dashwood, 12th Baronet (born 1964)
      - (1). George Francis Dashwood (born 1992)
      - (2). Robert Edward Dashwood (born 1993)
  - John Dashwood (1929–2013)
    - (3). Thomas Dashwood (born 1973)

== Notes ==
Baronetage of Great Britain
Preceded by Furnese baronets	Dashwood baronets of West Wycombe; 28 June 1707	Succeeded by Williams baronets
