= Thomas Thompson (banker) =

- Born: 1754
- Died: 1828 (aged 73–74); Paris
- Spouse: Philothea Perronet
- Children: 3 sons, 2 daughters

Thomas Thompson (1754–1828), was a Kingston upon Hull banker and Wesleyan Methodist preacher. The father of Thomas Perronet Thompson, he had the gothic mansion, Cottingham Castle, built in Cottingham, East Riding of Yorkshire.

== Biography ==
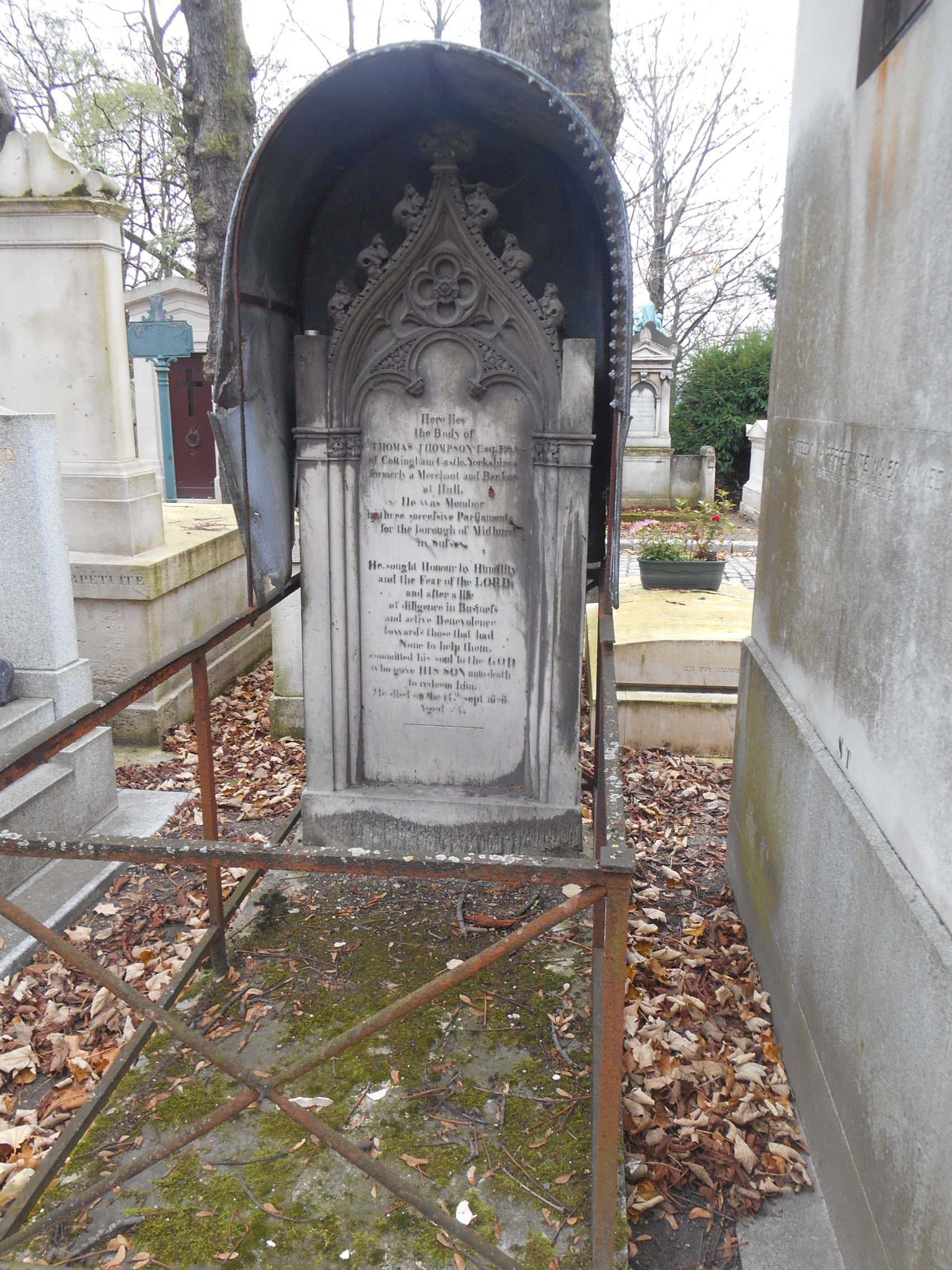
Grave in Père-Lachaise (40th division)

Thomas Thompson was born 5 April 1754, in relatively humble beginnings, his father was a yeoman in Owborough Grange, Swine, East Riding of Yorkshire. He was educated by the Rev. William Stead of Swine.

He married Philothea Perronet on 29 August 1781; she was a granddaughter of Vincent Perronet.

After having worked for fourteen years as a clerk to the merchants Wilberforce and Smith of Hull. Abel Smith, a partner of the firm made him manager of the Hull branch of his bank in 1784, and in 1788 he became a partner in the bank and merchant business.

Thompson acquired shareholdings in Sykes, Son & Co., Hull metal merchants, and in the Hull Dock Company; he became chairman of the Dock Company in 1812.

In 1807 Thompson became MP to the borough of Midhurst in 1807, a constituency controlled by Abel Smith's son Lord Carrington (Robert Smith, 1st Baron Carrington), in the role of MP he followed the line of his promoters. He claimed to have been ill-suited for the role, affirming that Carrington had "... spoiled a very good banker and made a very bad MP". He resigned as an MP in 1818. He objected to slavery, and was an associate of William Wilberforce, and part of the Anti-Slavery Association, and a member of the Clapham Sect.

By the beginning of the 19th century Thompson had become very wealthy, a large house known as Cottingham Castle was built for his family by 1816. Thompson was a Methodist lay preacher, and donated money towards the establishment of chapels. His concern for the state of the poor who entered workhouses led to establishment of a "Pauper Village" in Cottingham, providing land to poor families, renamed New Village (1829). He also published A History of the Church and Priory of Swine, in Holderness.

Thomas Thompson died in Paris on 14 September 1828, shortly after his retirement. He was buried in Père Lachaise cemetery.

His son Thomas Perronet Thompson (1783–1869) was a Parliamentarian, a Governor of Sierra Leone and a radical reformer. His granddaughter married Nevil Sidgwick.

Parliament of the United Kingdom
Preceded by Samuel Smith; James Abercromby	Member of Parliament for Midhurst; 1807–1818; With: James Abercromby; George Smith; Viscount Mahon; Sir Oswald Mosley, Bt	Succeeded by Samuel Smith; John Smith
