= Charles Long, 1st Baron Farnborough =

British politician (1760–1838)

The Right Honourable The Lord Farnborough GCB PC PC (Ire) FRS FSA
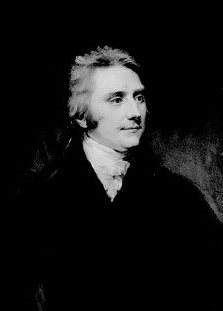

Chief Secretary for Ireland
- In office 1805–1806
- Monarch: George III
- Prime Minister: William Pitt the Younger
- Preceded by: Nicholas Vansittart
- Succeeded by: William Elliot

Paymaster of the Forces
- In office 1807–1826
- Monarchs: George III; George IV
- Prime Minister: The Duke of Portland; Spencer Perceval; The Earl of Liverpool
- Preceded by: Earl Temple and Lord John Townshend
- Succeeded by: William Vesey-FitzGerald

Personal details
- Born: 2 January 1760 London
- Died: 17 January 1838 (aged 78)
- Party: Tory
- Spouse: Amelia Hume (m. 1793; died 1837)
- Education: Emmanuel College, Cambridge

Charles Long, 1st Baron Farnborough, GCB, PC, PC (Ire), FRS, FSA (2 January 1760 – 17 January 1838) was an English politician and connoisseur of the arts.

== Early life ==
Born in London, he was the fourth surviving son of West Indies merchant Beeston Long and his wife Sarah Cropp. A senior branch of the family of Hurts Hall of Saxmundham in Suffolk established themselves in Jamaica after the conquest of the island in 1665. Educated at a private school in Greenwich and at Emmanuel College of Cambridge University, Long matriculated in 1779, but is not known to have taken a degree. He was entered at the Inner Temple, later making the grand tour between 1786 and 1788, exploring Rome and laying the foundation of his art collection under the tuition of James Byres.

== Political career ==
Long was a friend of William Pitt the Younger, whom he had met at Cambridge, and his involvement in politics began as early as 1788 when he was canvassing for Lord Hood, the ministerial candidate in the Westminster election, and he himself entered parliament in January 1789 as member for Rye, a Treasury controlled seat. He afterwards sat as member for Midhurst (1796–1802) and for Wendover (1802–06), (boroughs whose parliamentary representatives were nominated by Pitt's friend Lord Carrington) and for Haselmere (1806–26), where the sole patron was the Pittite Earl of Lonsdale. Becoming junior secretary to the Treasury in 1791, he acted as parliamentary whip and teller and in 1796 on the government's behalf, undertook much of the general election management. In 1801 when Pitt left office, Long followed, and was rewarded with a yearly pension of £1500. At Pitt's behest he was appointed Treasury advisor to the Prime Minister Henry Addington, and in 1802 was sworn of the Privy Council.

The following year his house at Bromley Hill in Kent was the location for negotiations between Pitt and Addington, in which he was the chief intermediary. When Pitt returned to power in 1804 Long was made a lord of the Treasury (1804–06) and then chief secretary to the Lord Lieutenant of Ireland (1805–06). During his brief tenure in Dublin he was prevailed upon to visit Anne Devlin, a co-conspirator in the republican rising Robert Emmet had staged in the city in July 1803, imprisoned in the tower of Dublin Castle. He was so appalled by the condition in which he found her that he arranged her immediate release.

Long took office in the Portland ministry as paymaster-general of the forces after Pitt's death in 1806, a post he retained until 1826 when he retired from politics. He was offered the Chancellorship of the Exchequer and the Secretaryship at War by Perceval, both of which he refused, considering himself neither inclined nor fit to fill either position. Except on matters arising from his ministerial responsibilities, he rarely spoke in the House of Commons. Rather than an initiator of policy, his strengths lay in his loyal and efficient political adjudications. In 1792 with Sir James Bland Burges, Long established the Sun newspaper as an instrument of the Tories, and he was the author of pamphlets on the French Revolution (1795) and the price of bread (1800).

In 1820 King George IV made Long a Knight of the Bath, and on his retirement from political life in 1826 he was raised to the peerage as "Baron Farnborough, of Bromley-Hill-Place, in the county of Kent". (Farnborough was then a village in Kent, near his country residence). Long was elected FRS in 1792, FSA in 1812, and was given an honorary LLD by his old university in 1833. The arts were Long's real passion, but due to limited resources he was unable to be a major patron or collector in his own right, however, as a minister and MP he was influential in furthering artistic causes such as the establishment of the National Gallery and the purchase of the Elgin Marbles, and was a founder of the British Institution in 1805. He acted as intermediary in 1792 between Pitt and Humphry Repton over improvements to the former's grounds at Holwood, and in 1799 when the Altieri Claudes were brought to England, they were first exhibited to English connoisseurs at Long's house in Grosvenor Place. In subsequent years he maintained a high profile in connection with his public patronage of the arts. A committee of taste was appointed in 1802 to supervise the erection of monuments to the heroes of the Napoleonic wars, of which Long was chairman, and in 1809 the responsibilities were extended to the repair of Henry VII's chapel at Westminster, with money voted by parliament. Long was consulted on everything from the need for a fig-leaf on the heroic statue honouring the Duke of Wellington, that had been subscribed for by the ladies of Great Britain (1821), to the appropriate order for the facade of the privy council offices in Whitehall (1824).

== Retirement from politics ==
Long's political ambitions were modest, though his retirement was nevertheless, a reluctant one. His reputation as an arbiter of taste led in 1834, to the opening of a campaign for the establishment of an Institution of British Architects, by way of an open letter to Lord Farnborough. He was an active trustee both of the British Museum and of the National Gallery, and as deputy director he was for many years a leading figure in the affairs of the British Institution. Long's advice on artistic matters was valued at the highest level. George IV, both as prince regent and as king, consulted him frequently over the commissioning of architecture, sculpture and painting. The prince's secretary once said that in matters of art, "The Prince Regent saw through Mr. Long's spectacles". Long negotiated royal commissions with artists such as Canova, Westmacott, and Lawrence, and when the king decided to reconstruct Windsor Castle, Long drew up a brief which detailed every important feature of the castle as subsequently remodelled by Jeffry Wyattville, from the formation of the Grand Corridor to the heightening of the keep, and he also made a sketch-plan in 1823 for the sunken garden below the east terrace.

Only a few miles from Pitt's at Holwood, Long's own country villa at Bromley Hill in Kent was an elegant enlargement of an earlier house which he bought in 1801. He and his wife were amateur artists and architects, and provided their own designs for the improvement to the house. The extensive grounds were progressively improved to create a much-admired garden which by 1809 offered two picturesque walks, each a mile long, and a distant view of the dome of St Paul's Cathedral. It was here that Long entertained George IV, William IV, and Queen Adelaide. He died here on 17 January 1838, leaving to the National Gallery fifteen artworks by Rubens, Vandyck, Canaletto, Teniers, Mola, Cuyp, and others.

== Lady Farnborough ==
Long married in 1793 Amelia Hume, eldest daughter of the prominent art collector Sir Abraham Hume, 2nd Baronet, by Amelia, daughter of John Egerton, Bishop of Durham. A watercolourist and garden designer, she completed her formal classical education with a visit to Italy, prior to her marriage. She designed the celebrated Italianate grounds at their country residence Bromley Hill, which subsequently became the main source for her sketches. Reputed to be the favourite pupil of Thomas Girtin, her early work is distinguished by a broad topographical style, and later work was influenced by Henry Edridge and Dr Thomas Monro. She died 15 January 1837, and a London newspaper reported that her husband Lord Farnborough was "dangerously ill in consequence of a shock occasioned by the death of his lady". He never properly recovered his health, and died a year later. There were no children from the marriage.

== Sources ==
- Dictionary of National Biography Long, Charles, Baron Farnborough, by Howard Colvin

Parliament of Great Britain
Preceded by William Dickinson; Charles Wolfran Cornwall	Member of Parliament for Rye; 1789–1796; With: William Dickinson 1789–1790; Lord Hawkesbury 1790–1796	Succeeded by Lord Hawkesbury; Robert Dundas
Preceded by Hon. Percy Charles Wyndham; Peter Thellusson	Member of Parliament for Midhurst; 1796–1801; With: Sylvester Douglas 1796–1800; George Smith 1800–1801	Succeeded by Parliament of the United Kingdom
Parliament of the United Kingdom
Preceded by Parliament of Great Britain	Member of Parliament for Midhurst; 1801–1802; With: George Smith	Succeeded by George Smith; Samuel Smith
Preceded by John Hiley Addington; George Canning	Member of Parliament for Wendover; 1802–1806; With: John Smith	Succeeded by Viscount Mahon; George Smith
Preceded by George Wood; Richard Penn	Member of Parliament for Haslemere; 1806–1826; With: Lord Garlies 1806–1807; Robert Plumer Ward 1807–1823; George Lowther Thompson 1823–1826	Succeeded by George Lowther Thompson; Sir John Beckett, Bt
Political offices
Preceded by Nicholas Vansittart	Chief Secretary for Ireland; 1805–1806	Succeeded by William Elliot
Preceded by Earl Temple; Lord John Townshend	Paymaster of the Forces; 1807–1826; With: Lord Charles Somerset 1807–1813; Hon. F. J. Robinson 1813–1817	Succeeded by Hon. William Vesey-FitzGerald
