= Caroline Leigh Gascoigne =

English poet and novelist (1813–1883)

- Born: Caroline Leigh Smith; 2 May 1813; London, England
- Died: 11 June 1883 (aged 70)
- Occupations: Poet, novelist
- Spouse: Ernest Frederick Gascoigne (m. 1834)
- Children: 3
- Parent: John Smith
- Relatives: John Abel Smith & Martin Tucker Smith (half-brothers)

Caroline Leigh Gascoigne (gas-koin′; née, Smith; 2 May 1813 – 11 June 1883) was a 19th-century English poet and novelist from London. The daughter of a wealthy banker, she began writing at an early age and went on to publish several works in both prose and verse, including Temptation and Evelyn Harcourt.

== Biography ==
Caroline Leigh Smith was born 2 May 1813 in London, England. She was the daughter of John Smith, M.P., and his third wife Emma Leigh. Her early years were spent at her father's estate, Dale Park in Sussex. Her father was a rich banker but he was accidentally poisoned by his nearly-blind wife, who gave him an overdose of laudanum. Her elder half brothers were the MPs John Abel Smith and Martin Tucker Smith.

Gascoigne began writing fiction and poetry at an early age. Her first published work, Temptation, in 1839, was followed by The School for Wives," in 1839; Evelyn Harcourt, in 1842; Belgravia, a poem, in 1851; Spencer's Cross Manor-House, a tale for children; and Recollections of the Crystal Palace, a poem, in 1852; The Next-Door Neighbours, in 1855; Doctor Harold, a novel, in 1865; My Aunt Prue's Railway Journey, in 1865; and Dr. Harold's Note-Book, in 1869.

In 1834, she married Lt.Col. (later, General) Ernest Frederick Gascoigne, eldest son of General Gascoigne, of Childwall, M.P. for Liverpool. The couple had three children.

Caroline Gascoigne died on 11 June 1883.

== Selected works ==
=== Novels ===
- Temptation, or, a wife's perils (1839)
- The School for Wives: A Novel (1839)
- Evelyn Harcourt: A Novel (1842)
- Spencer's Cross Manor House, a tale for young people (1852)
- Next Door Neighbours: A Novel (1855)
- Doctor Harold (1865)

=== Short story collections ===
- My Aunt Prue's railway journey (1865)
- Dr. Harold's Note-Book (1869)

=== Poems ===
- "Belgravia" (1851)
- "Recollections of the Crystal Palace" (1852)
- "England's Heroes!" (1855)

=== Contributor ===
- Doctor Marigold's prescriptions; Mugby junction (1922)

=== Articles ===
- "In memoriam: A memoir of Ernest Frederick Gascoigne" (1878)

== Gallery ==
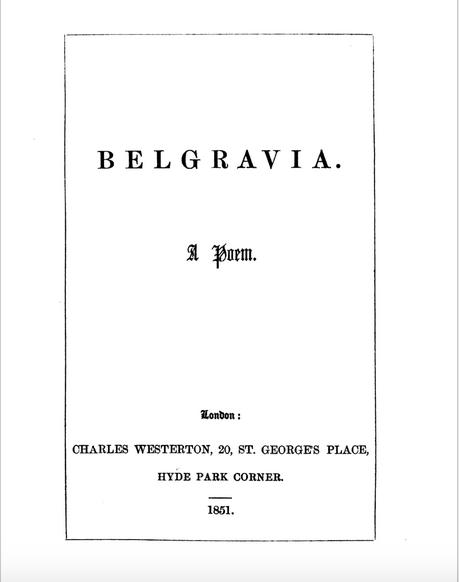
"Belgravia"

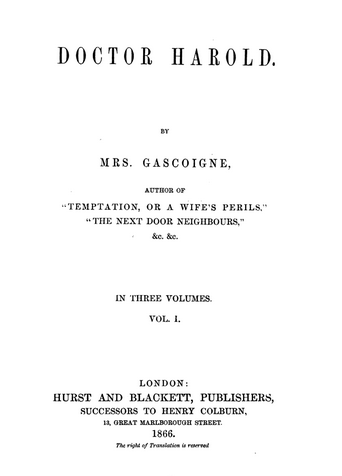
"Doctor Harold"

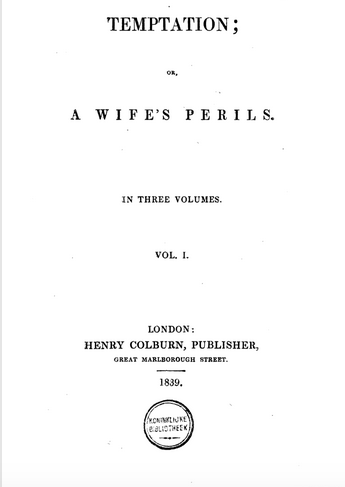
"Temptation, or, A wife's perils"

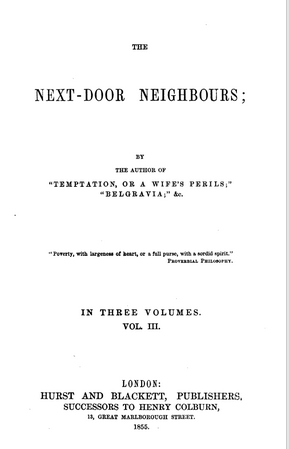
"The next-door neighbours"

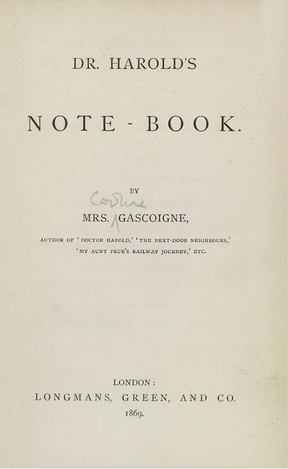
"Dr. Harold's Note-book"

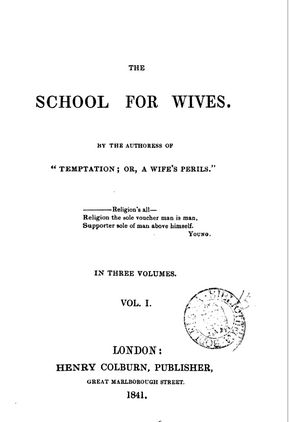
"The school for wives"
