= George Robert Smith (MP) =

English banker and Whig politician

Arms of Smith: Or, a chevron cotised sable between three demi-griffins couped of the last the two in chief respecting each other

George Robert Smith (2 May 1793 – 22 February 1869) was an English banker and Whig politician. His great-grandfather was Thomas Smith, founder of Smith's Bank; his father George Smith (1765–1836) was a director of the East India Company.

His uncle Lord Carrington was patron of the pocket borough of Midhurst in Sussex, for which his father was a Member of Parliament (MP) from 1830 to 1831. George Robert was returned as MP at the 1831 general election, but the Reform Act abolished most of the family's pocket boroughs, and Smith was left without a seat at the 1832 general election.

He contested Buckinghamshire at the 1837 general election, but without success. The following year his cousin Robert Carrington succeeded to the peerage, and George Robert was elected in his place as one of the two MPs for Wycombe. He held the seat only until the next general election, in 1841, having apparently fallen out with his conservative cousin.

Smith was a director of Smith's Bank in Derby from 1837 to 1843, and of the London Smith's from 1850. In 1847 he served on the committee of the British Relief Association.

Parliament of the United Kingdom
Preceded by John Abel Smith; George Smith	Member of Parliament for Midhurst; 1831–1832; With: Martin Tucker Smith	Succeeded by Hon. Frederick Spencer
Preceded by Robert Carrington; Sir George Dashwood, Bt	Member of Parliament for Wycombe; 1838–1841; With: Sir George Dashwood, Bt	Succeeded by Sir George Dashwood, Bt; Ralph Bernal Osborne
