= Martin Tucker Smith =

English banker and politician

Member of Parliament for Midhurst
- In office 1831–1832

Member of Parliament for Wycombe
- In office 1847–1865

Personal details
- Born: 6 July 1803
- Died: 10 October 1880 (aged 77)
- Spouse: Louisa Ridley
- Children: 10, including Gerard Smith
- Parent(s): John Smith; Elizabeth Tucker Smith
- Relatives: Sir Matthew White Ridley, 3rd Baronet (father-in-law)

Martin Tucker Smith (6 July 1803 – 10 October 1880) was a member of the Smith Banking dynasty, who served as a bank manager and MP.

== Biography ==
=== Early life ===
Martin Tucker Smith was born on 6 July 1803. He was the second son of John Smith, MP (1767–1842), and his wife Elizabeth (née Tucker). His father was a member of the family which owned the Smith's Bank group of companies, and Martin joined the family business, becoming a partner in the London bank Smith, Payne and Smiths.

=== Career ===
Like his father and many of his ancestors, Smith entered politics. At the 1831 general election he was elected as one of the two Members of Parliament (MPs) for Midhurst in Sussex, a rotten borough in the control of his first cousin Lord Carrington. However, the borough's representation was reduced to one member in 1832, and Smith stood down. He did not re-enter Parliament until the 1847 general election when he was elected unopposed as one of the two MPs for the borough of Wycombe in Buckinghamshire. He was re-elected at the next three general elections, before standing down at the 1865 general election.

Smith also served as a director on the British East India Company during its final years, before the company's liquidation in 1858.

=== Personal life ===
In 1831, he married Louisa Ridley, the daughter of Sir Matthew White Ridley, 3rd Baronet; they had ten children.

His third son Gerard Smith (1839–1920) was a British Army officer and banker who served as MP for Wycombe from 1883 to 1885, and as Governor of Western Australia from 1895 to 1900. After his death in 1880 at the age of 77, his estate was valued at £350,000 (equivalent to £36,403,000 in 2025 values).

Parliament of the United Kingdom
Preceded by John Abel Smith; George Smith	Member of Parliament for Midhurst; 1831–1832; With: George Robert Smith	Succeeded by Hon. Frederick Spencer
Preceded by Sir George Dashwood, Bt; Ralph Bernal	Member of Parliament for Wycombe; 1847–1865; With: Sir George Dashwood, Bt (to 1862); John Remington Mills (from 1862)	Succeeded by John Remington Mills; Charles Wynn-Carington
