= Charles Grey (British Army officer) =

British Army general (1804–1870)

General The Honourable Charles Grey
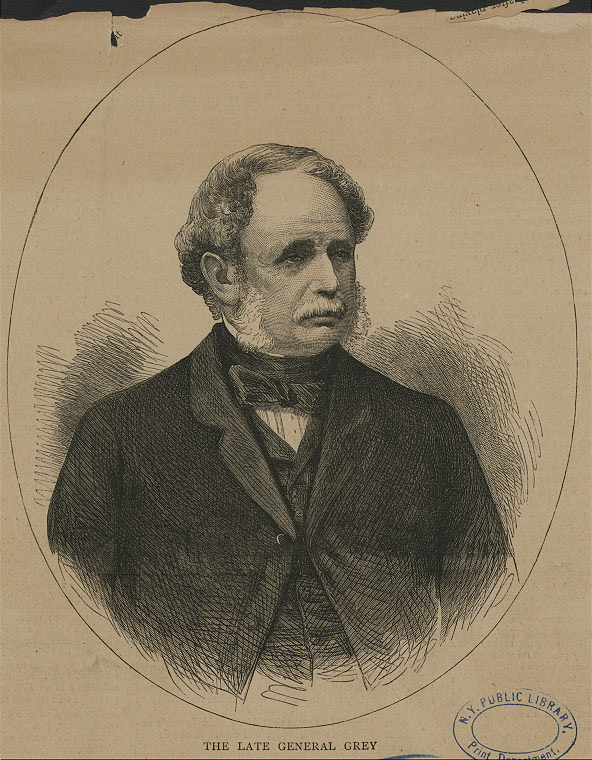

Private Secretary to the Sovereign
- In office 1861–1870
- Monarch: Victoria
- Preceded by: Albert, Prince Consort (unofficial)
- Succeeded by: Sir Henry Ponsonby

Personal details
- Born: 15 March 1804
- Died: 31 March 1870 (aged 66)
- Spouse: Caroline Eliza Grey (née Farquhar)
- Children: 5, including Albert, Mary and Louisa
- Parent(s): Charles Grey, 2nd Earl Grey; The Hon. Mary Ponsonby

General Charles Grey (15 March 1804 – 31 March 1870) was a British army officer, member of the British House of Commons and political figure in Lower Canada. In the last two decades of his life, he served successively as private secretary to Prince Albert and Queen Victoria.

== Early life ==
He was born in Northumberland, England, in 1804, the second son of Charles Grey, 2nd Earl Grey, by his wife, the Hon. Mary Ponsonby, daughter of William Ponsonby, 1st Baron Ponsonby. He was the younger brother of Henry, the 3rd Earl Grey. After a good private education he joined the British Army as a sub-lieutenant in 1820 and commanded the 73rd Regiment of Foot from 1833 to 1842.

== Career ==
Grey represented Wycombe in the British House of Commons from 1832 to 1837, defeating Disraeli to win the seat, which he held until 1837.

In 1838 he went to Canada with his brother-in-law, John Lambton, 1st Earl of Durham, where he was named a member of the Executive Council and Special Council of Lower Canada in June of that year, serving until 2 November. He returned to England with Lambton later that month and later obtained the influential position of secretary to Prince Albert from 1849 to 1861 and secretary to the Queen from 1861 until his death in 1870.

He was given the colonelcy of the 3rd (East Kent) Regiment of Foot in 1860, and transferred to the 71st (Highland) Regiment of Foot in 1863, a position he held until his death. He was promoted full general in 1865.

== Personal life ==
In 1836, he had married Caroline Eliza, daughter of Sir Thomas Harvie Farquhar, 2nd baronet. Their children included:

- Sybil Mary Grey (born 1848), married William Beauclerk, 10th Duke of St Albans
- Charles Grey (died young in 1855)
- Albert Henry George Grey, 4th Earl Grey, served as Governor-General of Canada.
- Victoria Alexandrina Elizabeth Grey (1853–1922), married Lewis Payn Dawnay, son of William Dawnay, 7th Viscount Downe
- Louisa Jane Grey (1855–1949), married William McDonnell, 6th Earl of Antrim, and served as pro tempore Mistress of the Robes to Queen Victoria
- Mary Caroline Grey (1858–1940), married Gilbert Elliot-Murray-Kynynmound, 4th Earl of Minto

== In popular culture ==
A character named Earl Grey, perhaps representing a fictitious descendant of Charles Grey, appears in the popular manga and anime franchise Black Butler. He plays a key role in 'Black Butler: Book of Murder' and has been a popular character throughout the series.

== Sources ==
- "Biography". Dictionnaire des parlementaires du Québec de 1792 à nos jours (in French). National Assembly of Quebec.
- bookcase from Charles C Gray 1848

Parliament of the United Kingdom
Preceded by Sir Thomas Baring, Bt; Robert Smith	Member of Parliament for Wycombe; 1832–1837; With: Robert Smith	Succeeded by Robert Smith; Sir George Dashwood, Bt
Court offices
Preceded by Sir Charles Phipps	Keeper of the Privy Purse; 1866–1867	Succeeded by Sir Thomas Myddleton-Biddulph
Preceded by The Prince Consort (unofficial)	Private Secretary to the Sovereign; 1861–1870	Succeeded by Sir Henry Ponsonby
Military offices
Preceded by Sir Thomas Erskine Napier	Colonel of the 71st (Highland) Regiment of Foot; 1863–1870	Succeeded by Robert Law
Preceded by Berkeley Drummond	Colonel of the 3rd (East Kent) Regiment of Foot; 1860–1863	Succeeded by John Wharton Frith
