= John Smith (Wendover MP) =

British politician, Member of Parliament for Wendover (1767–1842)

Arms of Smith: Or, a chevron cotised sable between three demi-griffins couped of the last the two in chief respecting each other

John Smith (6 September 1767 – 20 January 1842) was a British politician who sat in the House of Commons from 1806 to 1835 and a banker.

== Biography ==
=== Early life ===
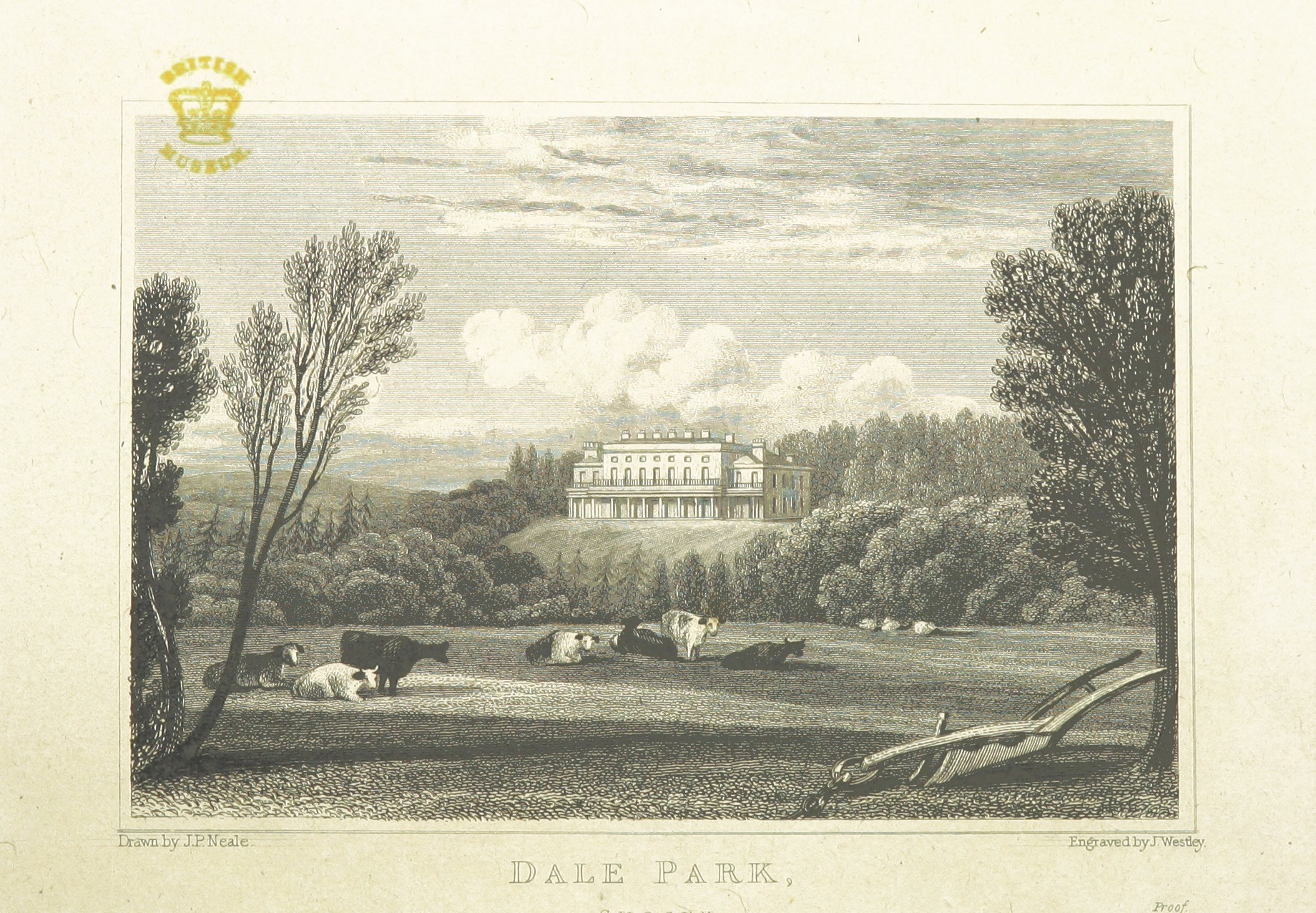
Dale Park, Sussex (John Preston Neale, 1829)

John Smith was born on 6 September 1767. He was the sixth son of Abel Smith II (1717-1788), a Nottingham banker who was a Member of Parliament for Aldborough, St Ives, and St Germans, and the brother of Robert Smith, 1st Baron Carrington. He lived at Blendon Hall in Kent and finally at Dale Park in Sussex. There is a fine memorial to him in Chichester Cathedral, comprising his recumbent effigy atop a chest tomb set within a gothic-arched niche.

=== Career ===
He served as a Tory Member of Parliament for Wendover from 1802 to 1806 and later represented Nottingham from 1806 to 1818, Midhurst from 1818 to 1830, Chichester from 1830 to 1831, and Buckinghamshire from 1831 to 1835. (He was also elected for Midhurst in 1806, but preferred to sit for Nottingham on that occasion. Both Wendover and Midhurst were pocket boroughs controlled by his brother Lord Carrington, but the competitive Nottingham constituency was considerably more prestigious.) Between 1800 and 1831 when pocket boroughs were abolished 12 members of the Smith family sat for the Midhurst parliamentary seat alone. In 1806, Smith served as a Manager of the newly formed London Institution.

=== Personal life and death ===
He married three times. By his second wife, Mary Tucker (1773–1809), he had two sons, John Abel Smith (1802–1871), who succeeded him as MP for Midhurst, and Martin Tucker Smith (1803–1890), who became MP for Wycombe; and he had two daughters by his third wife, Emma Leigh, including the writer, Caroline Leigh Gascoigne. He died on 20 January 1842 at Dale Park when he was accidentally poisoned by his nearly-blind wife, who gave him an overdose of laudanum.

His great-grandson Vivian Smith was created Baron Bicester in 1938.

Parliament of the United Kingdom
Preceded by John Hiley Addington; George Canning	Member of Parliament for Wendover; 1802–1806; With: Charles Long	Succeeded by Viscount Mahon; George Smith
Preceded by Sir John Borlase Warren; Daniel Parker Coke	Member of Parliament for Nottingham; 1806–1818; With: Daniel Parker Coke 1806–1812; The Lord Rancliffe 1812–1818	Succeeded by The Lord Rancliffe; Joseph Birch
Preceded by Thomas Thompson; Sir Oswald Mosley	Member of Parliament for Midhurst; 1818–1830; With: Samuel Smith 1818–1820; Abel Smith 1820–1830	Succeeded by John Abel Smith; George Smith
Preceded by William Stephen Poyntz; Lord John Lennox	Member of Parliament for Chichester; 1830–1831; With: Lord John Lennox	Succeeded by John Abel Smith; Lord Arthur Lennox
Preceded by The Marquess of Chandos; Robert Smith	Member of Parliament for Buckinghamshire; 1831–1835; With: The Marquess of Chandos 1831–1835; George Dashwood 1832–1835	Succeeded by The Marquess of Chandos; Sir William Young; James Backwell Praed
