= Sir Edwin Dashwood, 7th Baronet =

Edwin Dashwood, photograph from the early 1860s

Sir Edwin Hare Dashwood, 7th Baronet (7 September 1825 – 8 May 1882) was an English army officer in India, and a traveller and landowner in New Zealand.

== Life ==
He was the son of Capt. Edwin Sandys Dashwood of the Royal Horse Guards, fourth son of Sir John Dashwood-King, 4th Baronet, and his wife Emily Hare (died 1857), daughter of the Rev. Robert Hare, rector of Hurstmonceaux.

Edwin Dashwood was educated in France and at a military acadeny in Germany. His father died in Paris in 1845. His sister Amelia who had married Captain Henry Story died in 1847.

== India ==
Dashwood obtained an ensigncy in the 10th (the North Lincolnshire) Regiment of Foot, and went with them to India. In the First Anglo-Sikh War he showed gallantry at the Battle of Sobraon, recognised in a letter from Col. Thomas Harte Franks, Thomas Harte Franks, in first planting the regimental colors in the Sikh trench-line. Dashwood shortly after left for England, where he visited the ailing Sir John Dashwood-King, 4th Baronet at Halton, Buckinghamshire.

== New Zealand ==
Dashwood's brother-in-law Henry Story RN was an original purchaser of land in New Zealand, from the New Zealand Company, though he never moved there. Story's brother-in-law Constantine Dillon was a settler of the 1840s in the Waihopai Valley. In 1848, Dashwood resigned his commission and emigrated to New Zealand, with a plan to settle at Nelson. He made a quick survey in the hope of emulating Nathaniel Morse who had moved sheep east from Nelson to the area around Blenheim. He then bought a farm at Motueka and a sheep station near Blenheim on the Awatere River.

For commercial reasons, a land route for sheep from the Wairau River valley to what was then Port Cooper would have been significant. In 1850, Dashwood and Captain William Murray Mitchell joined forces to work out a route from Blenheim to what is now the Christchurch area, across the north end of South Island's Southern Alps. Mitchell, of the 84th Regiment, had journeyed in 1848 with Henry William Petre overland in North Island from Auckland to Wellington.

The pair, with a whaler named Harris, went up the valley of Waihopai River. They crossed a saddle, and descended the Awatere River. A further traverse south of a saddle took them to the Acheron River. From there they joined the valley of the Waiau Toa / Clarence River. They then took a mountain track to the plains of the north Canterbury Region. After a "miserable journey" they reached Riccarton. Their route, however, proved unsuitable for sheep driving. The place on the route they named Hamilton Plains is now Hanmer Springs. Dashwood Pass, discovered during this expedition, now bears Dashwood's name. Mitchell published an account of the journey in the The Nelson Examiner and New Zealand Chronicle.

Socially, Dashwood knew Sir William Augustus Congreve, 3rd Baronet, Nathaniel Morse, Richard Kindersley Newcome and Andrew Richmond. In 1850 Dillon reported in a letter to his wife Fanny Dorothea that Dashwood was lonely and drinking heavily, much concerned with his father's delirium tremens and the alcoholism shared with his uncle. He was also upset at his sister's death, and was living with another man's wife. In 1852 Dashwood was successful in applications under the pastoral license system with a large area of 250,000 acres (100,000 ha) of inland potential grazing land in South Island. He retained little of it, however, in due course passing most on to Henry Young, an acquaintance from Australia, and Edwin Corker Minchin ,who operated as land agents.

After his 1853 marriage in Scotland, Dashwood and his wife returned to New Zealand, his major holding being 7,000 acres (2,800 ha) at Bluff Run near Blenheim. His sheep farming proved profitable, and he added to his land, at Aorere near Collingwood.

== Return to the United Kingdom ==
In 1859, knowing of the illness of his uncle Sir George Dashwood, 5th Baronet, Edwin Dashwood sold off his New Zealand property and returned with his wife and sons to the family seat West Wycombe in England. He inherited the estate there of about 7,000 acres (2,800 ha) and the baronetcy in 1863 on the death of his uncle, Sir John Dashwood, 6th Baronet.

West Wycombe became a financial burden for Dashwood: Lady Elizabeth Dashwood, Sir George's widow who died in 1889, had life tenancy of the property and inherited most of his personal chattels. The great depression of British agriculture made the estates less remunerative.

Sir Edwin Dashwood died in 1882. He was succeeded in the baronetcy by his son Edwin.

== Family ==
In 1852, Dashwood visited England again and on 25 October 1853, married Roberta Henrietta (d. 11 November 1901), daughter of Sir Robert Abercromby, 5th Baronet. The couple had four sons, the first three being born at Nelson:

- Sir Edwin Dashwood, 8th Baronet
- George Julius Hare Dashwood (19 August 1856 – 30 November 1878)
- Sir Robert Dashwood, 9th Baronet
- Francis Dashwood (18 August 1863 – 12 August 1932), born at Freiburg.

There were also two daughters, Emily Bertha (died 1922, Edinburgh) and Mary Elizabeth Gordon (died 1908, Peterculter).
