= Sir John Dashwood-King, 3rd Baronet =

English country gentleman

Dashwood's Name Act 1741
- Act of Parliament
- Parliament of Great Britain
- Long title: An Act to enable John Dashwood and William Payne Esquires, and their respective Issue Male, and other the Devisees of the Estate of John King Doctor in Divinity, deceased, to take and use the Surname of King only, according to the Direction of the Codicil of the Will of the said Doctor King.
- Citation: 15 Geo. 2. c. 41 Pr.
- Territorial extent: Great Britain

Dates
- Royal assent: 16 June 1742
- Commencement: 1 December 1741 (Note: Start of session.)

Status: Current legislation

Sir John Dashwood-King, 3rd Baronet (4 August 1716 – 6 December 1793), was an English country gentleman. Born John Dashwood, he adopted the additional surname of King by a private act of Parliament, Dashwood's Name Act 1741 (15 Geo. 2. c. 41 Pr.), in accordance with the terms of his uncle Dr. John King's will.

== Early life ==
The son of Sir Francis Dashwood, 1st Baronet, by his third wife, Mary King, he was the half-brother of the infamous Francis Dashwood, 2nd Baronet. He was a member of the Hellfire Club which his brother had founded.

== Career ==
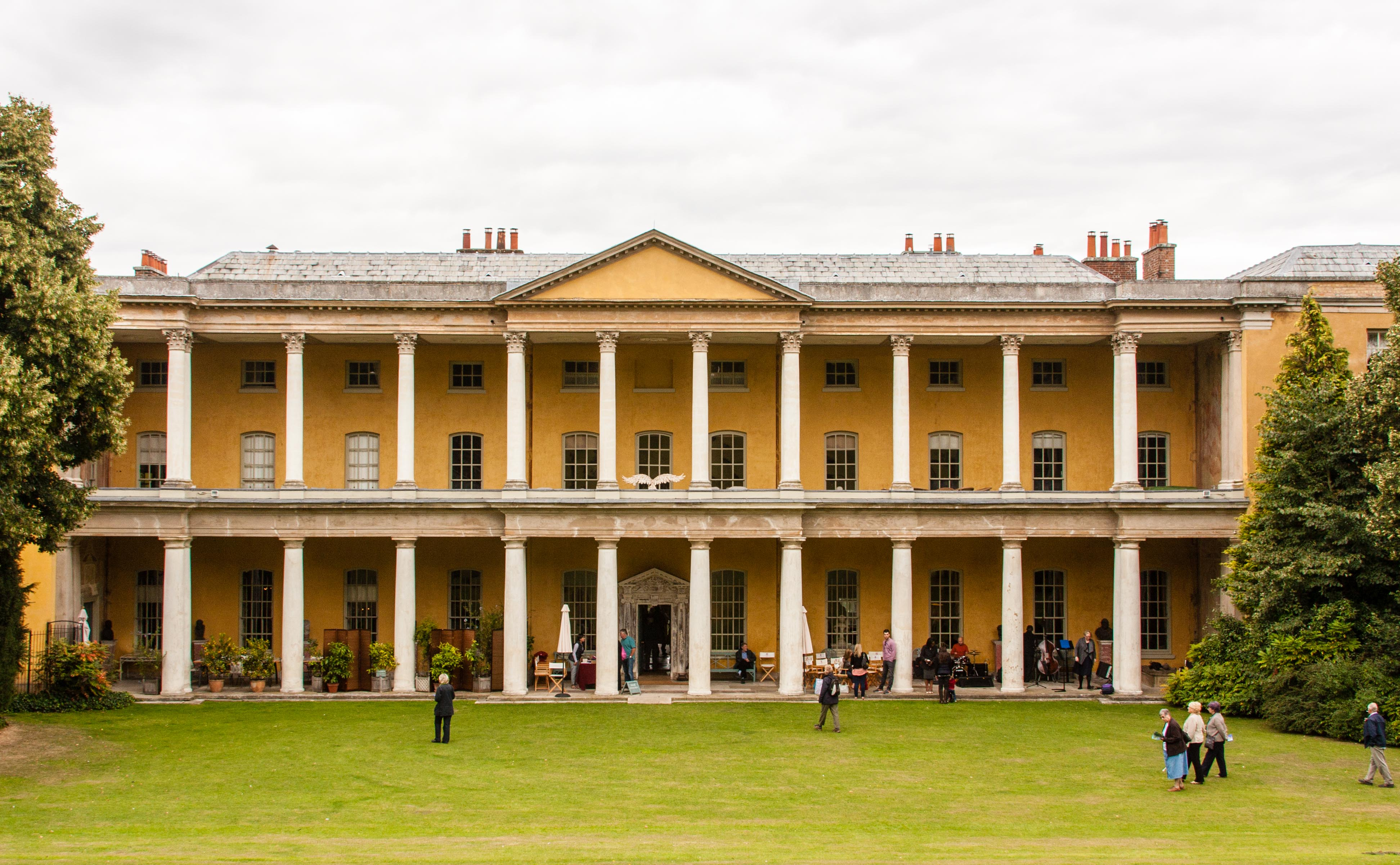
West Wycombe Park

His principal interests lay in his lands in Wales and Lincolnshire which he had inherited from his maternal uncles. From 1753 until 1761, he served as Member of Parliament for the pocket borough of Bishop's Castle, controlled by his brother-in-law John Walcott.

He served as High Sheriff of Montgomeryshire in 1777. On the death of his half-brother in 1781 he inherited the baronetcy and West Wycombe Park, but made no significant changes there before his death in 1793.

== Personal life ==
In 1761, he married Sarah Moore (d. 9 April 1777), by whom he had eight children, of whom four survived him:

- Francis Dashwood-King, (d. 9 November 1779)
- Sir John Dashwood-King, 4th Baronet (1765–1849), who married Mary Anne Broadhead, in 1789.
- William Dashwood-King (d. 1773)
- George Dashwood-King (d. 1801), who married Elizabeth Callander of Craigforth, in 1794.
- Sarah Dashwood-King (d. 1834), who married the Rev. John Walcott, son of Charles Walcott, in 1788.
- Elizabeth Dashwood-King (d. 1826), who married Vice-Admiral William Lechmere.
- Charles Dashwood-King (d. 1770)
- Mary Dashwood-King (d. 1774)

Sir John died on 6 December 1793 and was succeeded in the baronetcy by his eldest surviving son, John.

== Bibliography ==
- Dashwood, Sir Francis (1987). The Dashwoods of West Wycombe. London: Aurum Press Ltd. ISBN 0-948149-77-9.

Parliament of Great Britain
Preceded by Samuel Child; John Robinson Lytton	Member of Parliament for Bishop's Castle; 1753–1761; With: John Robinson Lytton 1753–1754; Barnaby Backwell 1754–1755; Walter Waring 1755–1759; Henry Grenville 1759–1761	Succeeded by Francis Child; Peregine Cust
Baronetage of Great Britain
Preceded by Francis Dashwood	Baronet (of West Wycombe); 1781–1793	Succeeded by John Dashwood-King
