= St Paul's Church, West Wycombe =

St. Paul's
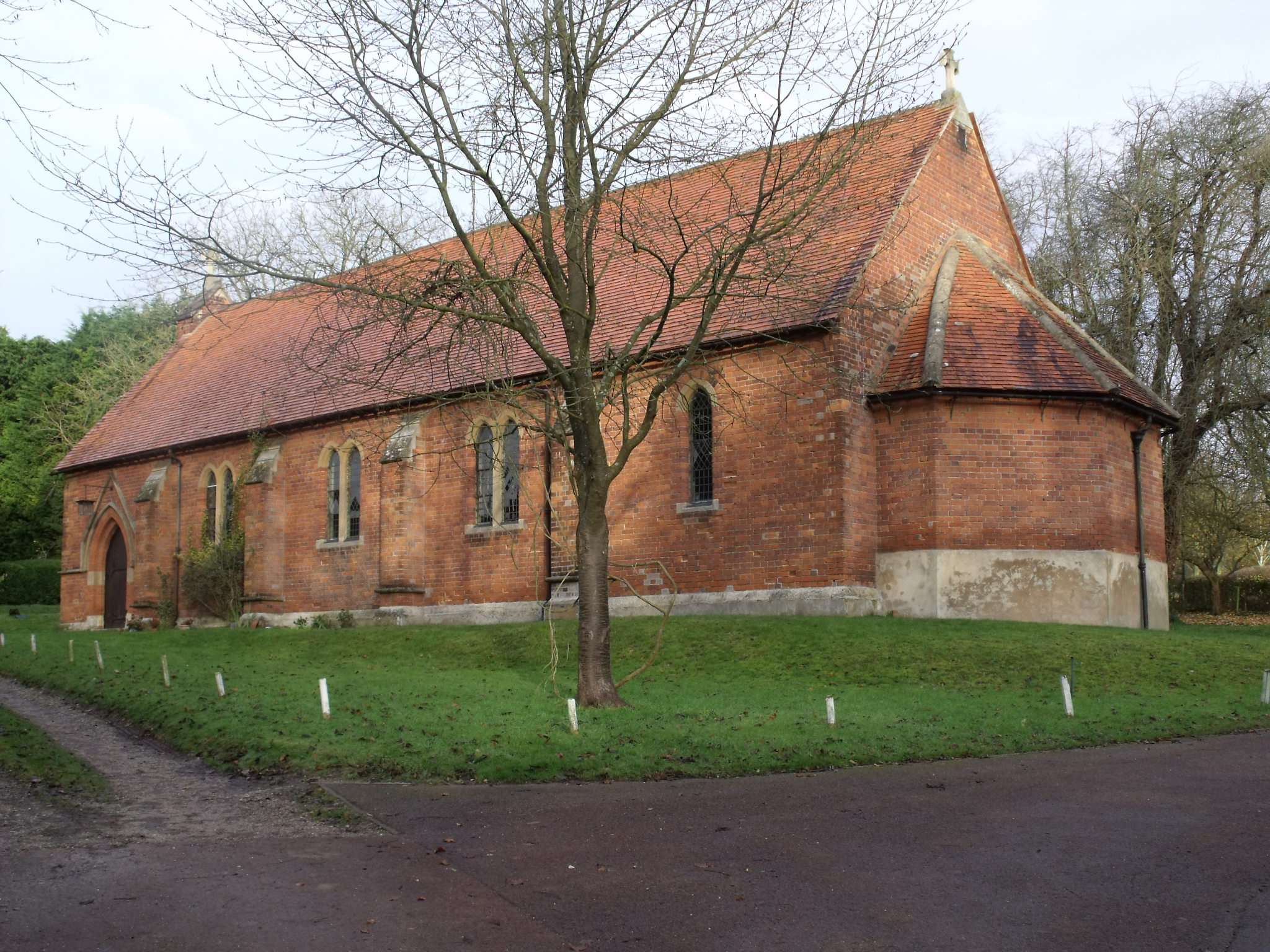
- The Church in 2012

- Location within Buckinghamshire
- 51.6451°N 0.8004°W
- Location: High Street, West Wycombe
- Country: England
- Denomination: Church of England

History
- Founded: 1875

Architecture
- Architect: John West Hugall

Clergy
- Rector: Lance Sharpe

St. Paul's Church, in High Street, West Wycombe, England, is one of two Anglican churches in the village.

St. Paul's was built by Lady Elizabeth Dashwood, widow of Sir George Henry Dashwood to serve the village of West Wycombe. The architect was J. W. Hugall of Oxford, and it was built in 1875.

Nicholas Pevsner says:

The CHURCH OF ST PAUL is of red brick with an apse and lancet windows.

The date given on the stained glass windows gives the date, 1875 (also the date given in the Victoria County History,) and the architect as J.W. Hugall. The roof features pitch pine roof trusses.

Near the church door is a large, traditional, font in which babies are baptised. It symbolises the start of the journey of faith.

There are two stained glass windows, one is a gift from the architect and the other was given by Sir Theodore H L Brinckman Bart. Opposite the door is a large crucifix of Christ the King. It came from a church in Italy. The organ is a small, single manual, chamber one and is used regularly.

There is also a statue of the Virgin Mary in the church and the Blessed Sacrament is reserved here. St. Paul's was consecrated by the Bishop of Buckingham on Sunday 13 June 1937.
