= Dale Park =

Coordinates: 50.88271°N 0.61652°W

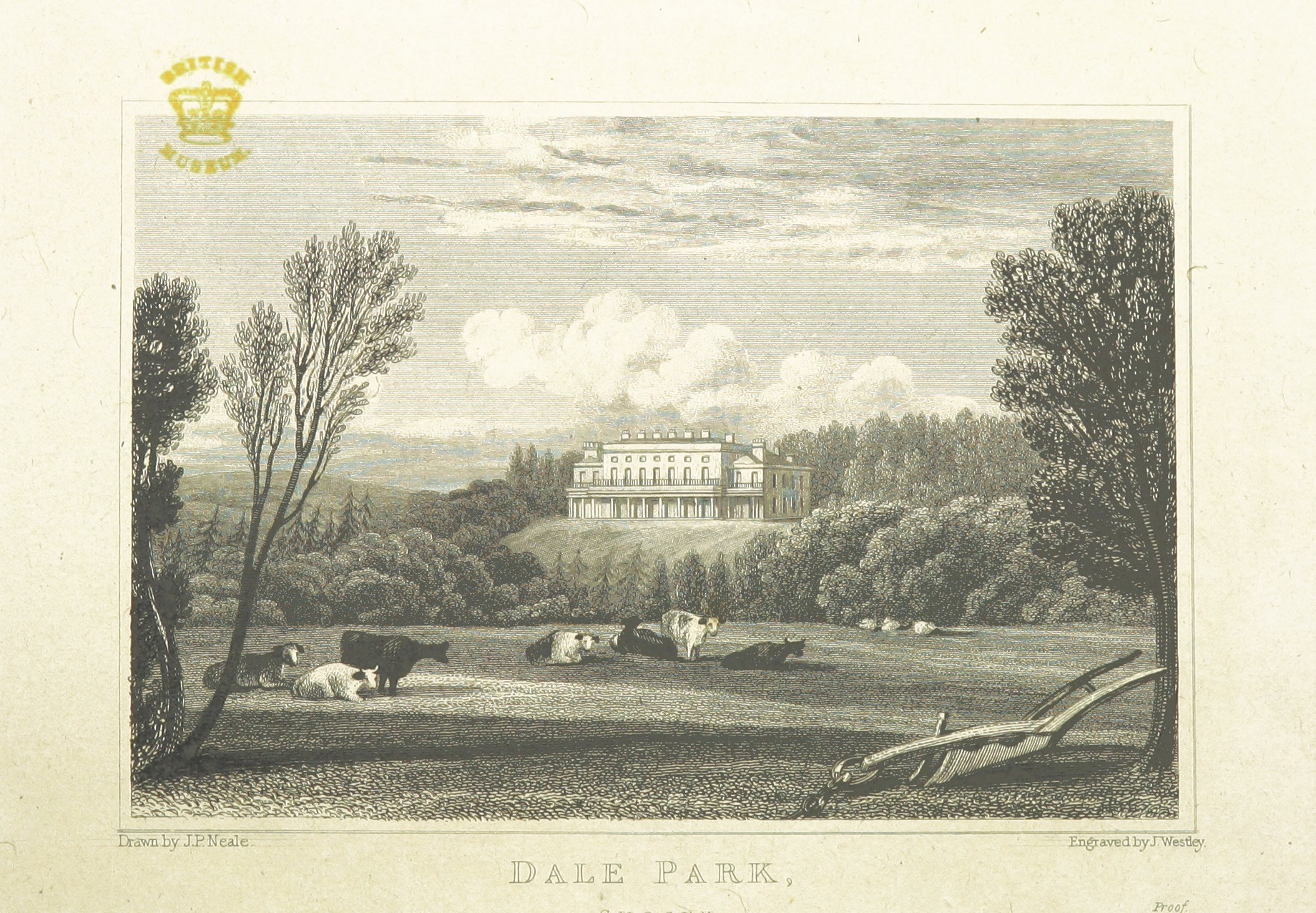
Dale Park, Sussex (John Preston Neale, 1829)

Dale Park was an English country house in Madehurst, West Sussex.

== History ==
In 1780, Sir George Thomas, 3rd Baronet created Dale Park near Madehurst by buying up separate pieces of land and joining them together into a 300-acre (120 ha) estate. He married Sophia Montagu, daughter of Admiral John Montagu and Sophia Wroughton, on 20 December 1782. The lived in Madehurst Lodge during the 1780s whilst their new house was constructed by the architect Joseph Bonomi. The house is thought to have still been under construction in 1791.

John Smith, MP for Wendover, bought the estate in 1825. He died there on 20 January 1842, He was succeeded by his son John Abel Smith, who subsequently became a financier and politician. In 1848, the house was sold to James Hamilton, Marquis of Abercorn. The Smith family continued to own land on the estate through the 19th century. In 1860, the house was sold to John Charles Fletcher. He died on 9 March 1875 and the estate was inherited by his son, Charles John Fletcher, who lived at Dale Park until at least 1914.

The house was also the birthplace of the writer Theodora Elizabeth Lynch in 1813. She was the daughter of Mary Ann and Arthur Foulks. Foulks owned 400 slaves and a sugar plantation in Jamaica.

Madehurst Cricket Club was formed in 1923, with its headquarters at Dale Park. The club disbanded after the house was demolished.

- Madehurst Cricket Club https://www.madehurstcricketclub.org/ still running today.

By the 1930s, Dale Park was in financial difficulty. The estate was bought by J H & F W Green Ltd in 1958. Although consideration had been given to listing the property, the local council did not object to its demolition. This took place around 1960.
