= Robert Carrington, 2nd Baron Carrington =

British politician (1796–1868)

The Right Honourable The Lord Carrington FRS
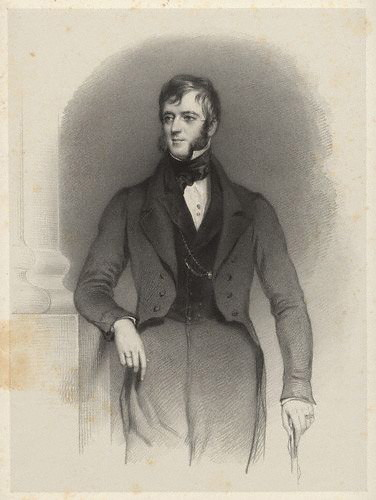

Member of Parliament for Wycombe
- In office 1 June 1831 – 18 August 1837
- Preceded by: Sir John Dashwood-King
- Succeeded by: George Robert Smith

Member of Parliament for Buckinghamshire
- In office 14 April 1820 – 1 June 1831
- Preceded by: William Selby Lowndes
- Succeeded by: John Smith

Member of Parliament for Wendover
- In office 4 August 1818 – 14 April 1820
- Preceded by: Abel Smith
- Succeeded by: Samuel Smith

Member of the House of Lords
- Lord Temporal
- In office 18 September 1838 – 17 March 1868
- Preceded by: The 1st Baron Carrington
- Succeeded by: The 3rd Baron Carrington

Personal details
- Born: Robert John Smith; 16 January 1796
- Died: 17 March 1868 (aged 72)
- Party: Whig
- Spouse(s): Elizabeth Weld-Forester; Charlotte Drummond-Willoughby
- Children: 6
- Parent(s): Robert Smith, 1st Baron Carrington; Anne Boldero-Barnard

Arms of Smith: Or, a chevron cotised sable between three demi-griffins couped of the last the two in chief respecting each other

Robert John Carrington, 2nd Baron Carrington (né Smith 16 January 1796 – 17 March 1868), was a politician and a baron in the Peerage of Great Britain. He was the son of Robert Smith, 1st Baron Carrington, and Anne Boldero-Barnard. He adopted the name "Carrington" in 1839.

== Politics ==
As Robert Smith, he served as a Member of Parliament for Wendover from 1818. He had succeeded his first cousin Abel Smith on the seat, and served together with his uncle, George Smith. He was succeeded by another of his uncles, Samuel Smith, the father of his predecessor, in 1820.

He was then elected MP for Buckinghamshire, succeeding William Selby Lowndes, and serving with the Marquess of Chandos. He was succeeded by John Smith, another uncle, in 1831.

The same year, he was elected MP for Wycombe, succeeding Sir John Dashwood-King, 4th Bt, and serving with, in turn, Sir Thomas Baring, 2nd Bt (until 1832), Charles Grey (1832–1837) and George Dashwood, later 5th Bt (from 1837) – the latter being the son of Smith's predecessor on the seat. After his father's death in 1838, and on his inheritance of the barony, he was succeeded on the Wycombe seat by his first cousin, George Robert Smith. He was elected to the Royal Society as a Fellow in 1839. Later that year he adopted the name Carrington by Royal Licence.

== County ==
He held the office of Lord Lieutenant of Buckinghamshire from 1838 until his death in 1868, and was concurrently appointed Colonel of the disembodied Royal Buckinghamshire Militia (King's Own). He immediately moved the headquarters and permanent staff to his house at Wycombe Abbey. He was still in command of the regiment when it was reorganised in 1852. He insisted that all recruits to the Royal Bucks should have their police records checked, and he interviewed each man personally, giving them 3 shillings in addition to the government bounty. He also supplemented the government's clothing allowance to get better quality cloth for the men's uniforms. When the regiment was embodied for home defence in June 1854, he rode at its head to Aylesbury station, giving the band boys rides on his horse on the way.

== Family ==
He married twice, firstly, in 1822, the Hon. Elizabeth Katherine Weld-Forester (1803–1832), daughter of Cecil Weld-Forester, 1st Baron Forester, and Lady Katherine Mary Manners. After the death of his first wife (from cholera), Carrington married, secondly, in 1840, the Hon. Charlotte Augusta Annabella Drummond-Willoughby (1815–1879), daughter of Peter Drummond-Burrell, 22nd Baron Willoughby de Eresby, and Lady Sarah Clementina Drummond. They had three sons and two daughters:

=== Issue ===
	Life span	Marriage(s)	Notes
by Elizabeth Katherine Weld-Forester
Hon. Cecile Katherine Mary Carrington	died 1907	Married Charles Colville, 10th Lord Colville of Culross (later created Viscount Colville of Culross), son of General Sir Charles Colville and Jane Mure; had issue.	
by Charlotte Augusta Annabella Drummond-Willoughby
Hon. Augusta Clementina Carrington	1841–1922	Married Archibald Campbell (later created Baron Blythswood), son of Archibald Campbell and Caroline Dick; no issue.	
Hon. Charles Robert Carrington, later 3rd Baron Carrington	1843–1928	Married Hon. Cecilia Harbord, daughter of Charles Harbord, 5th Baron Suffield, and Cecilia Baring; had issue.	Was created Earl Carrington in 1905 and Marquess of Lincolnshire in 1912.
Hon. William Henry Peregrine Carrington, later Sir William Carington	1845–1914	Married Julia Warden, daughter of Francis Warden; no issue.	
Hon. Eva Elizabeth Carrington	1847–1919	Married Charles Stanhope, Viscount Petersham (later 8th Earl of Harrington), son of Charles Stanhope, 7th Earl of Harrington, and Elizabeth Still de Pearsall; no issue.	
Hon. Rupert Clement George Carrington, later 4th Baron Carrington	1852–1929	Married Edith Horsefall, daughter of John Horsefall; had issue.	Inherited the barony from his older brother, who died without surviving male issue.

=== Other descendants ===
Among Carrington's descendants through his first daughter Cecile were his grandson Admiral Sir Stanley Colville and his great-grandson Sir John "Jock" Colville (nephew of the Admiral), civil servant and diarist. Harry Legge-Bourke, MP for Isle of Ely 1945–1973, was his great-grandson through his first son Charles.

Another great-grandson, through Carrington's third son Rupert, was Peter Carington, 6th Baron Carrington, a Conservative politician who served as Foreign Secretary in the cabinet of Margaret Thatcher from 1979 to 1982. Lord Carrington was also a descendant in the Colville line; his father, the 5th Baron, married the Hon. Sybil Marion Colville, daughter of the 2nd Viscount Colville of Culross (Admiral Colville's elder brother).

== Ancestry ==
Ancestors of Robert Carrington, 2nd Baron Carrington

8. Abel Smith (c. 1690 – 1756)
4. Abel Smith (1717–1788)
9. Jane Beaumont (died 1743)
2. Robert Smith, 1st Baron Carrington (1752–1838)
10. Thomas Bird (died 1746)
5. Mary Bird (1724–1780)
11. Elizabeth Martyn (1699–1758)
1. Robert Carrington, 2nd Baron Carrington
6. Lewyns Boldero-Barnard
3. Anne Boldero-Barnard (1756/57–1827)
14. William Popplewell
7. Anne Popplewell

Parliament of the United Kingdom
Preceded by George Smith; Abel Smith	Member of Parliament for Wendover; 1818–1820; With: George Smith	Succeeded by George Smith; Samuel Smith
Preceded by William Selby Lowndes; The Marquess of Chandos	Member of Parliament for Buckinghamshire; 1820–1831; With: The Marquess of Chandos	Succeeded by The Marquess of Chandos; John Smith
Preceded by Sir John Dashwood-King, 4th Bt; Sir Thomas Baring, 2nd Bt	Member of Parliament for Wycombe; 1831–1838; With: Sir Thomas Baring, 2nd Bt 1831–1832; Charles Grey 1832–1837; George Dashwood 1837–1838	Succeeded by George Dashwood; George Robert Smith
Honorary titles
Preceded by The Duke of Buckingham and Chandos	Lord Lieutenant of Buckinghamshire; 1839–1868	Succeeded by The Duke of Buckingham and Chandos
Peerage of Ireland
Preceded by Robert Smith	Baron Carrington; 2nd creation 1838–1868	Succeeded by Charles Carrington
Peerage of Great Britain
Preceded by Robert Smith	Baron Carrington; 3rd creation 1838–1868; Member of the House of Lords (1838–1868)	Succeeded by Charles Carrington
