= Thomas Smith (1682–1728) =

Arms of Smith of Nottingham: Or, a chevron cotised sable between three demi-griffins couped of the last the two in chief respecting each other. Granted in 1717 to Thomas Smith II and to all male descendants of his father

Thomas Smith II (1682-1728) of Broxtowe, Nottinghamshire and of Gaddesby in Leicestershire was a member of the Smith family of bankers, being the eldest son of Thomas Smith I (1631-1699) who in 1658 founded Smith's Bank in Nottingham.

He served as Sheriff of Leicestershire in 1717-18 and in 1717 he was granted a coat of arms (Or, a chevron cotised sable between three demi-griffins couped of the last the two in chief respecting each other) to be borne by him and by all male descendants of his father.

He married Mary Manley, a daughter of Thomas Manley of Thorney Hills, Staffordshire, but left no male issue, only 5 daughters. The family banking business was carried on and expanded by his two younger brothers Abel Smith I (1686-1756) of East Stoke, Nottinghamshire and Samuel Smith (1688-1751) of London.
