= Abel Smith (1748–1779) =

British banker and politician

Arms of Smith: Or, a chevron cotised sable between three demi-griffins couped of the last the two in chief respecting each other

Abel Smith III (29 June 1748 – 22 January 1779) of Wilford House in the parish of Wilford, near Nottingham, England, was a British banker and politician who sat briefly in the House of Commons from 1778 to 1779.

== Origins ==
Smith was the second of the six sons of Abel Smith the Younger (1717–1788), a Nottingham banker who, following his father Abel Smith the Elder (1686–1756), had continued developing the business into what was by the end of the century to become one of the biggest private banks in England. Abel Smith, the son of Thomas Smith (1631-1699) of Nottingham, who founded Smith's Bank, had contented himself with using some of his wealth to intervene in other people's elections.

Smith's next younger brother was Robert Smith, 1st Baron Carrington, who followed him as an MP for Nottingham and took over the business on his father's death; in 1796 he was raised to the peerage. Three of Abel Smith III's other younger brothers also became MPs.

== Career ==
His father Abel Smith II entered Parliament for a pocket borough in 1774 and subsequently for two more, in Cornwall. Four years later, in October 1778, the young Abel Smith III could rely on the family's standing in his home city to secure election as a Member of Parliament for Nottingham; however, he died only three months later.

== Marriage and issue ==
He married Elizabeth Uppleby, a daughter of Charles Uppleby of Wootton, by whom he had one daughter:

- Mary Smith (died 1861), wife of John Sargent, of Carlton Hall, Lindrick, Nottinghamshire.

Parliament of Great Britain
Preceded by General William Howe; Sir Charles Sedley	Member of Parliament for Nottingham; 1778–1779; With: General William Howe	Succeeded by General William Howe; Robert Smith
