= George Smith (1765–1836) =

British politician

Arms of Smith: Or, a chevron cotised sable between three demi-griffins couped of the last the two in chief respecting each other

George Smith (30 April 1765 – 26 December 1836) was a British Member of Parliament (MP), banker and director of the East India Company.

He was the fifth son of Abel Smith, a wealthy Nottingham banker and Member of Parliament. Four of his brothers were also members of parliament and one, Robert, was raised to the peerage as Baron Carrington. A portion of the family wealth was devoted to buying control of two pocket boroughs, Wendover and Midhurst, and Carrington kept the seats here almost exclusively for use by various members of the Smith family until his power was ended by the Great Reform Act.

Smith entered Parliament in 1791 as member for Lostwithiel, and also represented Midhurst and Wendover in a parliamentary career spread over forty years. He is an ancestor of the current British monarchy via Frances Bowes-Lyon, Countess of Strathmore and Kinghorne

== Family and legacy ==
Smith lived at Selsdon in Surrey. He married Frances Mary Mosley (bap. 24 March 1773, d. 5 July 1844), daughter of Sir John Parker Mosley, 1st Baronet, and Elizabeth Bayley. They had 9 sons and 6 daughters:

- George Robert Smith MP (of Selsdon Park) (1793–1869) m. Jane Maberly (1800–1879, the daughter of John Maberly).
- Oswald Smith (of Blendon Hall) (1794–1863) m. Henrietta Mildred Hodgson (1805–1891).
- John Henry Smith (of Purley Bury) (1795–1887).
- Thomas Charles Smith (1797–1876).
- Edward Peploe Smith (1803–1847) m.1 Henrietta Bailey, m.2 Harriet Chester.
- Arthur Smith (1804–1831).
- Edmund Smith (1809–1873) m. Hester Lushington (1816–1888).
- Mosley Smith (1810–1869).
- Alfred Smith, of Kingswood (1815–1886) m. Mary Wigram (1821–1869).
- Frances Mary Smith (1796–1867) m. Robert Mosley Master, "the Clogging Parson", Archdeacon of Manchester.
- Georgina Elizabeth Smith (1801–1828) m. Rev. Edward Serocold.
- Emily Smith (1806–1879) m. Rev. Charles Mayne.
- Catherine Smith (1807–1870) m. Edward Wigram.
- Sophia Sarah Smith (1812–1883) m. Rev. William Wigram.
- Augusta Mary Smith (1816–1892) m. Rev. Lewis Deedes.

His memorial in All Saints Church, Sanderstead, states:

GEORGE SMITH ESQUIRE

OF SELSDON BROTHER OF ROBERT, LORD CARRINGTON FOR NEARLY FORTY YEARS A MEMBER OF PARLIAMENT AND A DIRECTOR OF THE EAST INDIA COMPANY BORN APRIL XXX MDCCLXV DIED DECEMBER XXVI MDCCCXXXVI IN HIM UNUSUAL MEEKNESS AND SIMPLICITY WERE UNITED WITH UNCOMPROMISING PRINCIPLES OF JUSTICE AND HONOR THE PURITY OF HIS CHARACTER BOTH IN PUBLIC AND PRIVATE LIFE WAS UNIVERSALLY ACKNOWLEDGED AND RESPECTED AND HIS BENEVOLENCE WAS FELT BY ALL AROUND HIM HIS WIDOW AND THIRTEEN SURVIVING SONS AND DAUGHTERS WHO INSCRIBE THIS MONUMENT TO HIS MEMORY ARE CONSOLED BY THE RECOLLECTION OF HIS PIETY HIS HOPE AND TRUST IN GOD AND HIS CONSTANT ENDEAVOR TO DISCHARGE THE DUTIES OF HIS STATION AS A SERVANT OF CHRIST. KEEP INNOCENCY AND TAKE HEED UNTO THE THING THAT IS RIGHT:

FOR THAT SHALL BRING A MAN PEACE AT THE LAST.

His family were slave owners, his son George Robert Smith placing a claim to be compensated for the freedom of 461 slaves, worth £17,945 10s 3d, the largest claim made in Croydon.

Parliament of Great Britain
Preceded by Viscount Valletort; Reginald Pole-Carew	Member of Parliament for Lostwithiel; 1791–1796; With: Reginald Pole-Carew	Succeeded by Hans Sloane; William Drummond
Preceded by Charles Long; Sylvester Douglas	Member of Parliament for Midhurst; 1800–1801; With: Charles Long	Succeeded by Parliament of the United Kingdom
Parliament of the United Kingdom
Preceded by Parliament of Great Britain	Member of Parliament for Midhurst; 1801–1806; With: Charles Long 1801–1802; Samuel Smith 1802; Edmund Turnor 1802–1806	Succeeded by John Smith; William Wickham
Preceded by John Smith; Charles Long	Member of Parliament for Wendover; 1806–1830; With: Philip Stanhope, 4th Earl Stanhope 1806–1807; Francis Horner 1807–1812; Abel Smith 1812–1818; Robert Smith 1818–1820; Samuel Smith 1820–1830	Succeeded by Samuel Smith; Abel Smith
Preceded by John Smith; Abel Smith	Member of Parliament for Midhurst; 1830–1831; With: John Abel Smith	Succeeded by George Robert Smith; Martin Tucker Smith
