= Sir George Dashwood, 5th Baronet =

Sir George Henry Dashwood, 5th Baronet (c. 1790 – 4 March 1862) was an English landowner and politician who sat in the House of Commons in two periods between 1832 and 1865.

Dashwood was the eldest son of Sir John Dashwood-King, 4th Baronet, and his wife Mary Ann Broadhead. He was educated at Eton College and the University of Oxford. Unlike his father, a Tory who resisted the Reform Bill, George was a progressive Whig and Liberal, making their relationship somewhat cool. Sir John much preferred his estate at Halton House to that at West Wycombe Park, so George took up residence in the latter shortly after marrying his mother's niece, Elizabeth Broadhead (d. 24 May 1889), daughter of Theodore Henry Broadhead, on 17 March 1823.

Sir John left politics in 1831, in the face of popular agitation for electoral Reform, and George stood for Parliament the following year, being returned as Member of Parliament for Buckinghamshire. He held that seat until 1835. In 1837, he was returned for the borough of Wycombe, formerly his father's seat, and remained one of its Members of Parliament until his death in 1865.

On 1st August 1836 Sir George claimed for and was awarded compensation for three plantations in Barbados under the Slave Compensation Act 1837.

Claim Barbados 2034 (Spring plantation, also known as Walkes Spring) awarded £3,384 15s 11d. At the time of award there were 161 enslaved people on the estate. Claim Barbados 4598 (Over Hill plantation) awarded £2,441 0s 4d. At the time of award there were 109 enslaved people on the estate. Claim Barbados 4925 (Ashton Hall plantation) was awarded £1,945 16s 7d. At the time of the award there were 83 enslaved people on the estate. Sir George was awarded a total of £7771 12s 10d, an equivalent of over £800,000 in 2026.

Dashwood succeeded his father in the baronetcy in 1849. He liquidated his grandfather's estates in Lincolnshire and Wales, in 1851, and used the money so raised to overhaul the estate at West Wycombe. He also sold off the contents of Halton House in 1849, and the estate itself in 1853.

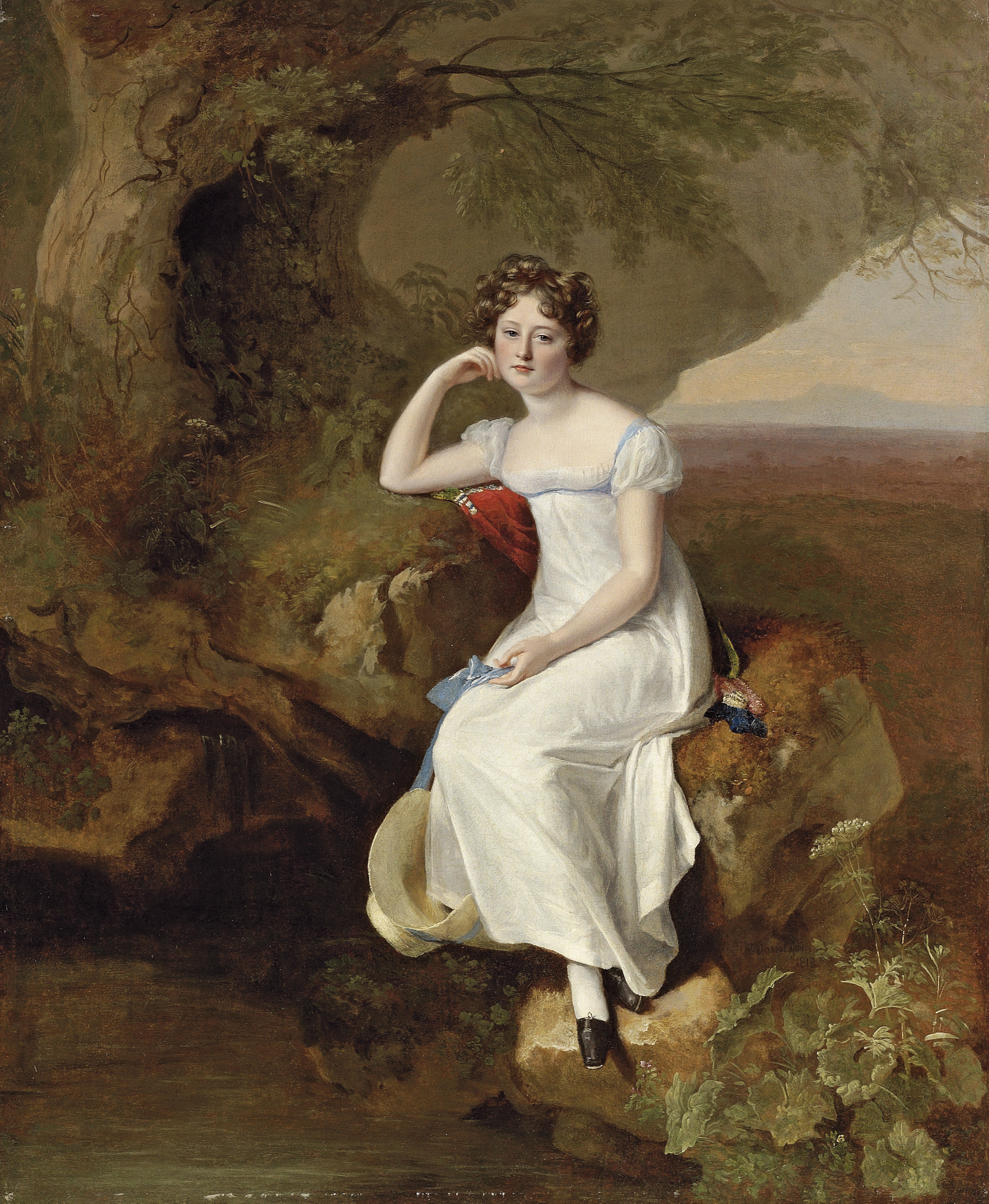
The future Lady Dashwood, 1818 portrait

Dashwood died at West Wycombe Park aged 71. With no issue, he was succeeded by his brother John, leaving his wife Elizabeth as life tenant of West Wycombe. She subsequently built St Paul's Church at West Wycombe.

Parliament of the United Kingdom
Preceded by Marquess of Chandos; John Smith	Member of Parliament for Buckinghamshire; 1832–1835; With: Marquess of Chandos; John Smith	Succeeded by Marquess of Chandos; Sir William Young, Bt; James Backwell Praed
Preceded by Robert Smith; Charles Grey	Member of Parliament for Wycombe; 1837–1863; With: Robert Smith 1837–1838; George Robert Smith 1838–1841; Ralph Bernal 1841–1847; Martin Tucker Smith 1847–1862	Succeeded by Martin Tucker Smith; John Remington Mills
Baronetage of Great Britain
Preceded by John Dashwood-King	Baronet (of West Wycombe); 1849–1862	Succeeded by John Dashwood
