= Samuel Smith (1754–1834) =

British Member of Parliament and banker

Arms of Smith: Or, a chevron cotised sable between three demi-griffins couped of the last the two in chief respecting each other

Samuel Smith (14 April 1754 – 12 March 1834) was a British Tory Member of Parliament and banker.

== Biography ==
Samuel Smith the fourth son of Abel Smith, a wealthy Nottingham banker and Member of Parliament. Four of his brothers were also Members of Parliament and one, Robert, was raised to the peerage as Baron Carrington. A portion of the family wealth was devoted to buying control of two pocket boroughs, Wendover and Midhurst, and Carrington kept the seats here almost exclusively for use by various members of the Smith family until his power was ended by the Great Reform Act.

Smith entered Parliament in 1788 as member for St Germans, and was an MP for the next 44 years, also representing Leicester (1790–1818), Midhurst (1818–1820) and Wendover (1820–1832). He and his son Abel were Wendover's last MPs, as they sat together as its members for the last two years before the borough's abolition. In 1826, being the longest continually-serving MP, he became Father of the House. He did not return to Parliament after the 1832 Great Reform Act, dying two years later.

In 1801 Smith bought Woodhall Park in Hertfordshire, which still belongs to his descendants.

== Family ==
Smith married Elizabeth Turnor on 2 December 1783. They had seven daughters and four sons. As well as his son Abel, his grandson Samuel George Smith was a Member of Parliament.

Several of his children married into the family of the Earl of Leven. The eldest son, Abel Smith, married Lady Marianne Leslie-Melville, youngest daughter of Alexander Leslie-Melville, 9th Earl of Leven, on 28 August 1822. The third son, Henry Smith, married Lady Lucy Leslie-Melville, eldest daughter of the 9th Earl of Leven, on 14 July 1824. The youngest daughter, Charlotte Smith, married the Hon. Alexander Leslie-Melville, fifth son of the 9th Earl of Leven, on 19 October 1825. In addition, his grandson Henry Abel Smith (1826–1890), son of Henry Smith and Lady Lucy Leslie-Melville, married his first cousin Elizabeth Mary Pym, daughter of Francis Pym and Lady Jane Elizabeth Leslie-Melville, second daughter of the 9th Earl of Leven, on 30 October 1849; they were the grandparents of Sir Henry Abel Smith who served as Governor of Queensland.

Parliament of Great Britain
Preceded by John Hamilton; Abel Smith	Member of Parliament for St Germans; 1788–1790; With: John Hamilton 1788–1790; Sir Charles Hamilton 1790	Succeeded by Marquess of Lorn; Hon. Edward James Eliot
Preceded by John Macnamara; Charles Loraine Smith	Member of Parliament for Leicester; 1790–1801; With: Thomas Parkyns 1790–1800; Thomas Babington 1800–1801	Succeeded by Parliament of the United Kingdom
Parliament of the United Kingdom
Preceded by Parliament of Great Britain	Member of Parliament for Leicester; 1801–1818; With: Thomas Babington	Succeeded by John Mansfield; Thomas Pares
Preceded by Thomas Thompson; Sir Oswald Mosley	Member of Parliament for Midhurst; 1818–1820; With: John Smith	Succeeded by John Smith; Abel Smith
Preceded by George Smith; Robert Smith	Member of Parliament for Wendover; 1820–1832; With: George Smith 1820–1830; Abel Smith 1830–1832	Constituency abolished
Preceded by Sir John Aubrey, 6th Baronet	Father of the House; 1826–1832	Succeeded by George Byng
