= Dashwood baronets =

Set index for Dashwood baronets

There have been two baronetcies created for members of the Dashwood family, one in the Baronetage of England and one in the Baronetage of Great Britain. As of 2026 both creations are extant.

- Dashwood baronets of Kirtlington Park (1684)
- Dashwood baronets of West Wycombe (1707)
