= Dashwood baronets of Kirtlington Park (1684) =

Escutcheon of the Dashwood baronets of Kirtlington Park

The Dashwood baronetcy, of Kirtlington Park in the County of Oxford, was created in the Baronetage of England on 16 September 1684 for Robert Dashwood, later Member of Parliament for Banbury and Oxfordshire. There was a special remainder, in default of male issue of his own, to the heirs male of his father.

He was the son of George Dashwood, an Alderman of London and Commissioner of Revenue, "an extremely wealthy excise farmer". Cokayne notes the report that George Dashwood was offered a baronetcy but did not take up the patent, and his widow Margaret née Perry was granted the rank of a baronet's widow.

The 1st Baronet was succeeded by his grandson the 2nd Baronet, who also represented Oxfordshire in the House of Commons. On his death in 1779 the title passed to his eldest son the 3rd Baronet, Member of Parliament for Woodstock for 36 years.

The 4th Baronet sat as Member of Parliament for Truro. The 5th Baronet served as Lord-Lieutenant of Oxfordshire.

== Dashwood baronets, of Kirtlington Park (1684) ==
- Sir Robert Dashwood, 1st Baronet (1662–1734)
- Sir James Dashwood, 2nd Baronet (1715–1779)
- Sir Henry Watkin Dashwood, 3rd Baronet (1745–1828)
- Sir George Henry Dashwood, 4th Baronet (1786–1861)
- Sir Henry William Dashwood, 5th Baronet (1816–1889)
- Sir George John Egerton Dashwood, 6th Baronet (1851–1933)
- Sir Robert Henry Seymour Dashwood, 7th Baronet (1876–1947)
- Sir Henry George Massy Dashwood, 8th Baronet (1908–1972)
- Sir Richard James Dashwood, 9th Baronet (1950–2013)

The heir presumptive is the present baronet's fifth cousin twice removed Alexander Thomas Whitburn Dashwood (born 1950), who is a fourth-great-grandson of the 2nd Baronet through his younger son Thomas Dashwood (1749–1825).

== Extended family ==
- Arthur Paul Dashwood (1882–1964), third son of the 6th Baronet, was a major in the Royal Engineers. He married the novelist E. M. Delafield.
- George Dashwood, younger brother of the 1st Baronet, married Angelina Peyton, daughter of Sir Algernon Peyton of Doddington. He was the grandfather of Sir Henry Peyton, 1st Baronet, of the Peyton baronets of Doddington (3rd creation, 1776), who changed his surname from Dashwood.
