= Abel Smith (1717–1788) =

British politician; (1717–1788)

Arms of Smith: Or, a chevron cotised sable between three demi-griffins couped of the last the two in chief respecting each other, as granted to his third son, Robert Smith, 1st Baron Carrington (1752–1838) and by Vivian Smith, 1st Baron Bicester (1867–1956), the great-grandson of his son John Smith (1767–1842) and by his eldest brother Sir George Smith, 1st Baronet (c. 1714–1769)

Abel Smith (baptised 14 March 1717 – 12 July 1788) of Wilford House in the parish of Wilford, near Nottingham, England, was one of the leading bankers of his time, a member of a banking family, and also served as a Member of Parliament.

Smith was known as Abel Smith the Younger, to distinguish him from his father of the same name. Some much later secondary sources have called him Abel Smith II.

== Origins ==
Smith was baptised on 14 March 1717 at Nottingham, the third son and successor of Abel Smith (died 1756), a banker of Nottingham, the second son and heir of Thomas Smith (1631–1699), a mercer at Nottingham who in 1658 founded Smith's Bank. His mother was Jane Beaumont (1689–1743), a daughter of George Beaumont of Chapelthorpe in Yorkshire.

== Career ==
He was apprenticed at the age of fifteen to William Wilberforce, a merchant adventurer from Hull (grandfather of William Wilberforce the slavery abolitionist) and became a partner in the firm of Wilberforce and Smith, eventually becoming managing partner, whilst at the same time continuing an involvement with his father's bank at Nottingham. On the death of his father in 1699 he succeeded as a partner to Smith's Bank, together with his eldest brother Sir George Smith, 1st Baronet (1713-1769) "of East Stoke in the County of Nottingham" (created a baronet in 1757), and in 1700 he assumed sole control. In 1758 he founded a bank in London, Smith & Payne, and two other provincial banks, at Lincoln in 1775 and Hull in 1784, both separately constituted.

In 1774 he was elected as a Member of Parliament for Aldborough in Suffolk, a pocket borough controlled by Henry Pelham-Clinton, 2nd Duke of Newcastle-under-Lyne (1720–1794), a close associate. He later successively represented St Ives in Cornwall (a seat controlled by Humphrey Mackworth Praed) and St Germans in Cornwall, controlled by Edward Eliot family, on the advice of Pitt. Later a proportion of the family wealth was devoted to buying the Smiths a couple of pocket boroughs of their own, and by the early 19th century his son, Robert Smith, 1st Baron Carrington, could nominate MPs at both Midhurst and Wendover.

He seems to have become an MP as much with the business advantages in mind as with any high political ambitions. Brooke quotes him as writing, shortly before he was first elected in 1774, "I see many solid advantages accruing to my family from a seat in Parliament, the best of which, the article of franking [the right to free postage, valuable in those days of heavy postal rates], will save a very considerable expense in so extensive a business as that I am engaged in." Although he supported the government, his first two speeches in the House of Commons were both attacks on the government for the way in which they had allotted subscriptions for government loans, in each case referring to occasions when his own firm had been excluded.

== Marriage and issue ==
In 1745 he married Mary Bird (1724–1780), a daughter of Thomas Bird (died 1746) (son of William Bird (died 1731)) of Coventry by his wife Elizabeth Martyn (1699–1758), a daughter of Francis Martyn (1637–1713) and Elizabeth Doughty (1665–1748). His wife's younger sister, Elizabeth Bird, was the mother of the slavery abolitionist William Wilberforce.

By his wife he had nine children, of whom five sons followed him into Parliament:

- Thomas Smith (1746–1769)
- Abel Smith (1748–1779), MP for Nottingham
- Robert Smith, 1st Baron Carrington (1752–1838), MP for Nottingham, raised to the peerage in 1796
- Samuel Smith (1754–1834) of Woodhall Park, MP for Leicester, Malmesbury, Midhurst, St Germans and Wendover
- William Smith (born 1756)
- George Smith (1765–1836), MP for Lostwithiel, Midhurst and Wendover
- John Smith (1767–1842) of Blendon Hall, MP for Nottingham, Wendover, Midhurst and Buckinghamshire
- Lucy Smith (c1760–1835)
- Elizabeth Smith (died 1789), married William Manning, MP

The historian Lewis Namier has said that between 1770 and 1910 at least 24 of Smith's descendants had served in the Commons with a combined term of 364 years.

== Death and burial ==
He died at Wilford on 12 July 1788, aged 71, and was buried in St. Peter's Church, Nottingham.

== See also ==
- Smith's Bank

== Sources ==
- John Brooke, The House of Commons 1754–1790: Introductory Survey (Oxford: Oxford University Press, 1968, reprinted from Volume I of Namier & Brooke, The History of Parliament: The House of Commons 1754–1790, London: HMSO, 1964).
- Abel Smith Last Will and Testament, 12 November 1785. Public Record Office catalogue Reference: Prob 11/1168.

Parliament of Great Britain
Preceded by Hon. Aubrey Beauclerk; The Earl of Lincoln	Member of Parliament for Aldborough; 1774–1778; With: Charles Wilkinson 1774–1777; William Baker 1777–1778	Succeeded by William Baker; Hon. William Hanger
Preceded by Adam Drummond; Philip Dehany	Member of Parliament for St Ives; 1780–1784; With: William Praed	Succeeded by Richard Barwell; William Praed
Preceded by Edward James Eliot; Dudley Long	Member of Parliament for St Germans; 1784–1788; With: John James Hamilton	Succeeded by John James Hamilton; Samuel Smith
