= John Abel Smith =

British politician (1802–1871)

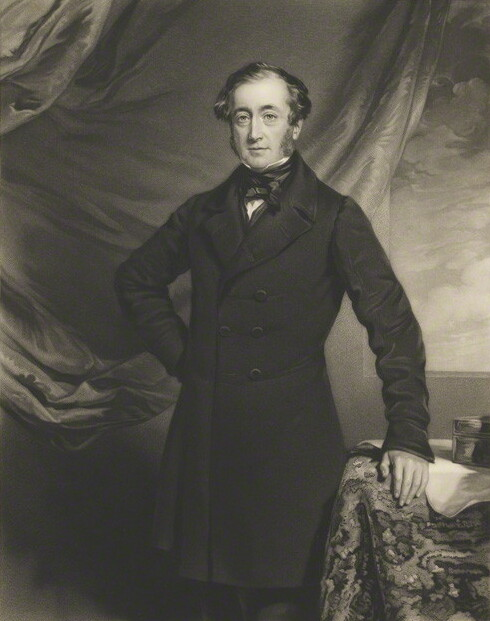
John Abel Smith by William Overend Geller, after Frederick Richard Say.

John Abel Smith (2 June 1802 – 7 January 1871) was a British Member of Parliament (MP) for Chichester and Midhurst.

He was the son of John Smith who preceded him as one of the members of parliament for Midhurst.

Smith married Anne Jervoise, the daughter of Sir Samuel Clarke Jervoise on 26 December 1827. He was the father of Hugh Colin Smith and Dudley Robert Smith (1830–1897).

Smith was a founding partner of the Hong Kong–based trading company Jardine, Matheson and Co. and in 1835 became a partner in the merchant banking firm of Magniac, Smith & Co. along with partners Hollingworth Magniac and Oswald Smith at 3, Lombard Street, London. William Jardine agreed to make them agents for Jardines with the proviso that "At no time shall it be expedient that we should give up the option of carrying on transactions with other London houses." In 1841 the bank was renamed Magniac, Jardine & Co. when William Jardine became a partner on his return to England.

In 1847, Smith sat on the Committee of the British Association for the Relief of Distress in Ireland and the Highlands of Scotland, which had been founded by his friend Lionel de Rothschild.

On 26 July 1858 Abel Smith and Lord John Russell, presented Lionel de Rothschild to the House of Commons. The Commons then voted to allow Rothschild, as a Jew, to take the oath on the Old Testament only.

Abel Smith Street, in central Wellington, New Zealand, was named after him in 1840: he was a Director of the New Zealand Company .

Parliament of the United Kingdom
Preceded by Abel Smith; John Smith	Member of Parliament for Midhurst; 1830–1831; With: George Smith	Succeeded by George Robert Smith; Martin Tucker Smith
Preceded by Lord John Lennox; John Smith	Member of Parliament for Chichester; 1831 – 1859; With: Lord John Lennox to 1831; Lord Arthur Lennox 1831–1846; Lord Henry Gordon-Lennox from 1846	Succeeded by Lord Henry Gordon-Lennox; Humphrey William Freeland
