= Smith's Bank =

Banking partnerships in London and provinces (1658–1918)

Samuel Smith & Co
- Arms of Smith: Or, a chevron cotised sable between three demi-griffins couped of the last the two in chief respecting each other

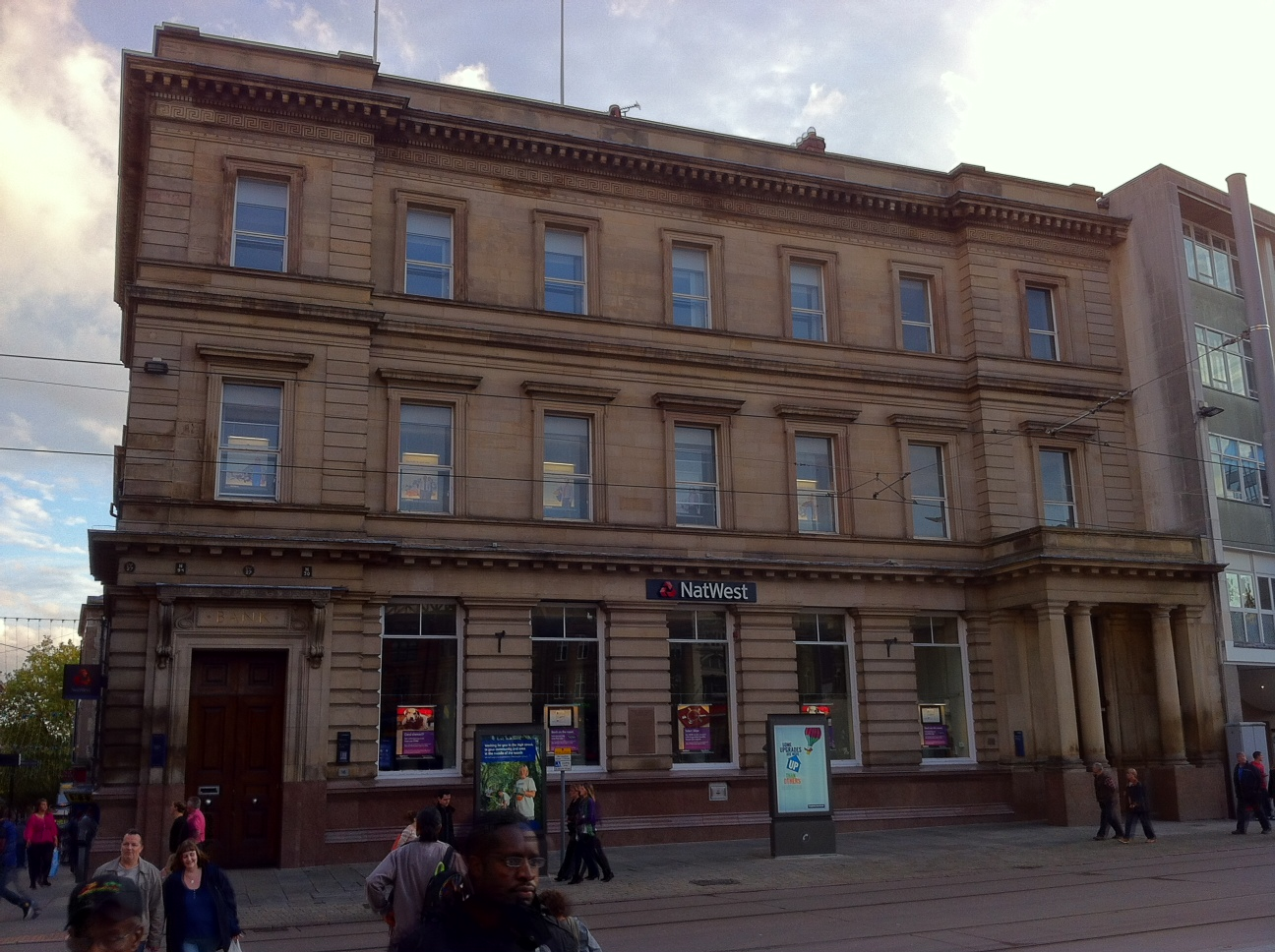
- The main bank building in Old Market Square, Nottingham
- Founded: 1658
- Defunct: 1902
- Fate: Merged with the Union Bank of London
- Headquarters: Nottingham, England

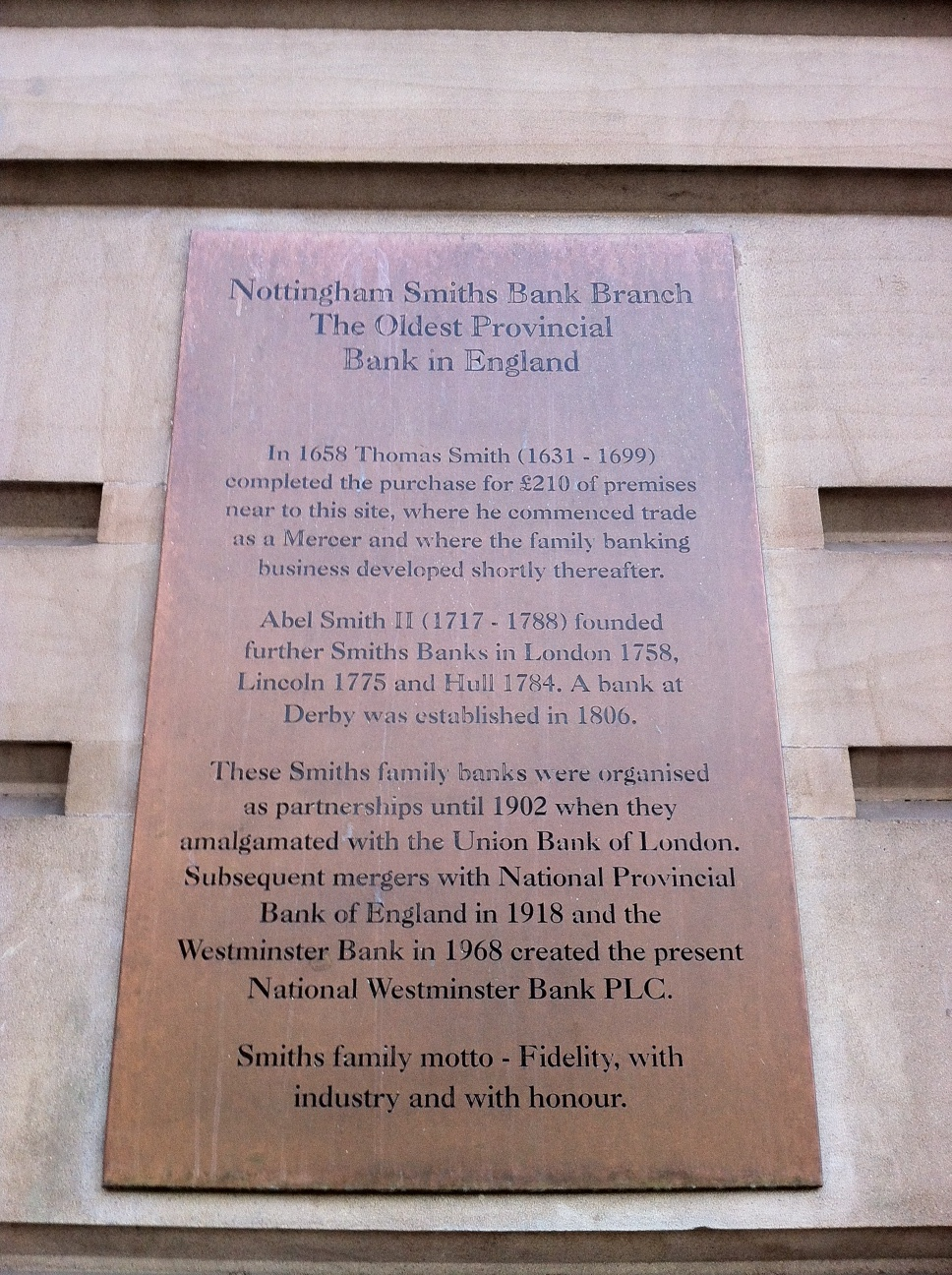
Plaque on Smith's Bank in Nottingham

Samuel Smith & Co was a series of English banking partnerships in London and the provinces, all controlled by the Smith family that operated between 1658 and 1918. Although Smith's Bank was never a single entity, the first bank was established in Nottingham by Thomas Smith; often dated to 1658, it is believed to have been the first bank to be formed outside London.

Smith's grandson, Abel Smith the Younger, substantially increased the scale of the enterprise, opening banks in Lincoln and Hull and, most importantly, the London firm of Smith & Payne. Other banks were later opened or acquired in the east midlands area.

The bank lost its direction in the late nineteenth century and its solution was to merge with the Union Bank of London in 1902, forming the Union of London & Smith's Bank. This in turn was acquired by the National Provincial Bank in 1918, which merged into today's National Westminster Bank in 1970.

== History ==
=== Early years ===
Thomas Smith (1631–99), was a mercer, and local alderman; as with many merchants his trade led to the safe keeping of funds and hence to banking. Premises that he used for his merchant and banking business were purchased in 1658, the year used to indicate the approximate formation of the bank. However, there is no actual record of when he started banking and it was probably earlier in the decade. Regardless of the actual date, Thomas was clearly a banking pioneer: Richards stated that Thomas Smith "appears to have been the only English provincial banker in the seventeenth century". while Hilton Price, writing in 1890, stated that "The Nottingham Bank is the oldest existing county bank in England". Funds came both from the original mercer trade and the collection of excise funds – Thomas had been appointed a sub-commissioner of excise in 1674. "In developing his banking business on the twin foundations of mercery and revenue remittance, he was anticipating by the better part of a century the technique employed by the founders of a number of the more successful eighteenth-century country banks."

On the death of Thomas senior in 1699, Thomas Smith II (1682–1728) succeeded to the business and it was only then that the bank was separated from the original mercer trade. Young Thomas extended the influence of the bank and one of its strengths was that "for want of banking accommodation elsewhere many firms from as far away as Leeds or Manchester came to Nottingham for banking business." As the bank grew, Thomas acquired land and status including the office of High Sheriff of Leicestershire in 1717. His memorial in St Mary's Church, Nottingham, mentions his "exact integrity and skill in his extensive Business, by which he acquired an extensive Fortune".

Thomas Smith II had only daughters and left the bank to his brothers Samuel and Abel. Samuel was a London goldsmith and acted as the London agent of the Nottingham Bank. Abel ran the Nottingham Bank, then known as Samuel and Abel Smith & Co. After Samuel's death in 1751 the partnership was known as Abel Smith & Sons and Samuel's family took no further part in the bank's future.

=== Abel Smith II ===
Young Abel Smith (1717–88) was the outstanding figure in the history of Smith's Bank. His descendants have included prominent figures in the city, including a governor of the Bank of England; a chairman of National Provincial Bank; several members of parliament, and a Foreign Secretary (Lord Carrington). Reflecting its prestige, the name Abel Smith has also metamorphosed into an unhyphenated double-barrelled surname.

Abel Smith II had been apprenticed at the age of 15 to the Hull merchant adventurer William Wilberforce (grandfather of the eponymous campaigner), becoming a partner in Wilberforce and Smith and eventually running it, while at the same time continuing an involvement with the Nottingham Bank. On the death of Abel senior in 1757, the Nottingham partnership rested with his sons George and Abel II (the elder brother remained a merchant in London). However, in the following year George resigned and it was the youngest brother Abel who was to take the bank forward.

Almost immediately Abel proceeded to found a bank in London; although he was not without connections in the City it was an unusual move for a country banker. Abel took into partnership John Payne of London to form Smith & Payne; Payne was a prosperous London merchant and chairman of the East India Company with a brother Edward as a director of the Bank of England. The partnership with Payne covered both the London and Nottingham banks and lasted until 1799 on the death of Payne's son. The original agreement was that Smith should manage Nottingham and Payne London, with two-thirds of the profits going to Smith and one-third to Payne. There were various changes in the partnership during the period, the first being René Payne succeeding his father in 1764. Abel had five sons (all of whom were Members of Parliament) and the second of these, Robert Smith (later the first Lord Carrington), joined the firm in 1773, when the bank changed its name to Smith, Payne & Smiths. The third son, Samuel Smith III, joined in 1780.

Abel Smith II also founded two other banks – at Lincoln in 1775 and Hull in 1784, both separately constituted. Smith, Ellison & Brown was the first bank to open in Lincoln; Abel Smith's partners were prominent local businessmen, John Brown being the resident partner, and all three had equal shares. The death of Brown in 1792 left the bank in the control of the Smith and Ellison families. The Hull bank opened as Abel Smith & Sons, the partners being Abel Smith and his two sons, Robert and Samuel.

=== Later years ===
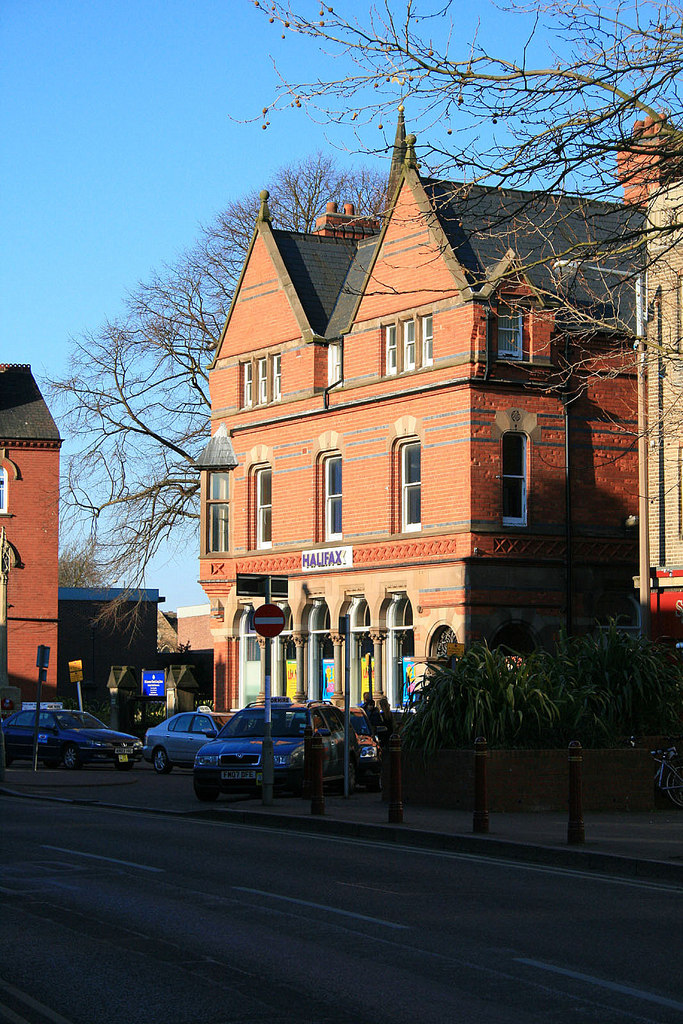
Smith's Bank in Long Eaton built by Fothergill Watson in 1899. Now Bank of Scotland plc, trading as Halifax.

Abel Smith II died in 1788; although the bank had lost a driving force, it did not stand still. A new bank was opened in Derby in 1806, known as Samuel Smith & Co. For the first time, the family had acquired an existing bank, Richardson & Co., as the base; the partners were the three youngest sons of Abel: Samuel, George and John. The Gainsborough agency was converted into a branch bank in 1813. Later in the century, in 1871, the Nottingham Bank (now Samuel Smith & Co.) acquired James and Charles Robinson of Mansfield, and in 1880 the Newark bank of Godfrey & Riddell. The Nottingham and Lincoln banks were particularly active in the latter part of the nineteenth century, opening around twenty branches or agencies between them.

As new generations entered the bank the partnership holdings became more widespread and the Smith grouping of banks lost some of its earlier cohesion. Complaints were made that the London partners would not give a lead to the provinces. The Lincoln Bank's proposal of a formal merger of all the banks was not accepted and in 1899 Lincoln said they were going to approach Barclay & Co.; Nottingham threatened to follow. This prompted the preparation of a group balance sheet which showed that London earned 38% of profits and Nottingham and Lincoln a further 42%. Further amalgamation proposals followed, first for a limited company and next a public joint stock company. However, the senior London partner, Samuel George Smith, resisted all change. When he died in 1900, discussions with several banks followed. It was the potential loss of the Smith name that prevented a deal with Barclay & Co., but the Union Bank of London was more accommodating: thus, in 1902 the Union of London and Smith's Bank was born. Eight of the 23 directors of the enlarged bank were Smiths and a Smith became chairman of the National Provincial Bank in 1947.

== See also ==
- John Tawell, 'the man hanged by the electric telegraph', a murderer whose first capital crime had been to forge a £10 note on Smith's Bank.
- Baron Carrington
- Baron Bicester
- Sampson, Anthony, Anatomy of Britain, 1962, re Smith family.
