= Robert Smith, 1st Baron Carrington =

British banker and politician (1752–1838)

The Right Honourable The Lord Carrington FRS FSA
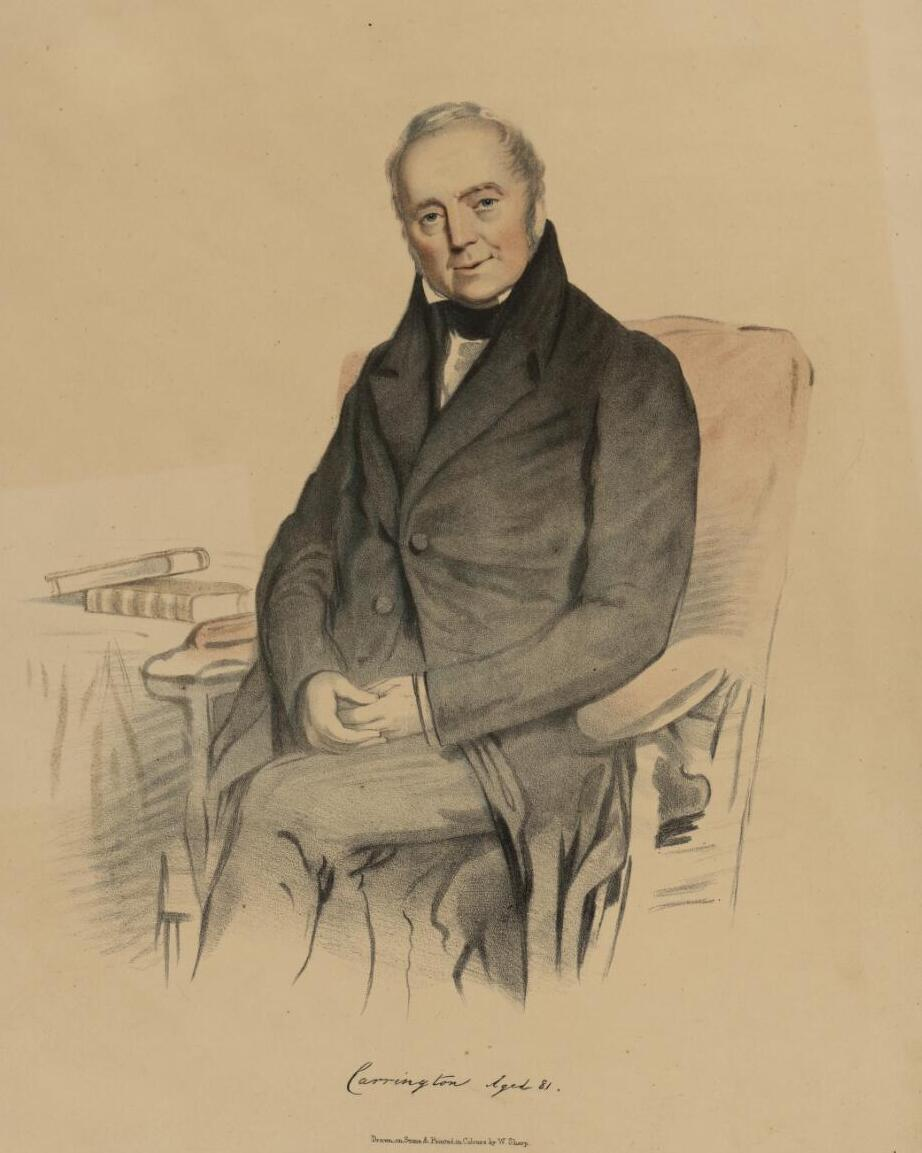
- Portrait by William Sharp, c. 1820

Member of Parliament for Nottingham
- In office 9 February 1779 – 20 October 1797
- Preceded by: Abel Smith
- Succeeded by: John Borlase Warren

Member of the House of Lords
- Lord Temporal
- In office 20 October 1797 – 18 September 1838
- Preceded by: Peerage created
- Succeeded by: The 2nd Baron Carrington

Personal details
- Born: 22 January 1752
- Died: 18 September 1838 (aged 86)
- Spouse(s): Anne Boldero-Barnard (died 1827); Charlotte Hudson
- Children: 6, including Robert
- Parent(s): Abel Smith; Mary Bird

Robert Smith, 1st Baron Carrington (22 January 1752 – 18 September 1838), was a British banker and politician who sat in the House of Commons of Great Britain from 1779 to 1797 when he was raised to the peerage.

== Early life ==
Smith was the third son of Abel Smith (1717–1788) and his wife Mary (née Bird, 1724–1780). His grandfather, also named Abel Smith (c. 1690 – 1756), was the founder of Smith's Bank of Nottingham. He married, as his first wife, Anne Boldero-Barnard (1756–1827), daughter of Lewyns and Anne (Popplewell) Boldero-Barnard, at Tottenham on 6 July 1780.

== Politics ==
Smith succeeded his elder brother Abel, who died on 22 January 1779, three months after having been returned as MP for Nottingham. Smith was returned unopposed to replace him as MP for Nottingham in a by-election on 9 February 1779. He was reelected for Nottingham in 1780, 1784, 1790 and 1796.

In 1796, he was raised to the Peerage of Ireland as Baron Carrington, of Bulcote Lodge. His elevation to the Peerage was largely due to his involvement in 'sorting out' the parlous personal financial circumstances of the Prime Minister William Pitt the Younger.

The following year he was made Baron Carrington, of Upton in the County of Nottingham, in the Peerage of Great Britain, and had to vacate his seat in the House of Commons. He was replaced as one of the two members of parliament for Nottingham by Sir John Borlase Warren.

== Later life ==
Smith was elected a Fellow of the Royal Society in 1800 and of the Society of Antiquaries in 1812. In 1819, he was admitted as Nobleman to Magdalene College, Cambridge. He was the Captain of Deal Castle from 1802 until his death.

According to the Legacies of British Slave-ownership at the University College London, Carrington was awarded a payment as a slave trader in the aftermath of the Slavery Abolition Act 1833 with the Slave Compensation Act 1837. The British government took out a £15 million loan (worth £1.48 billion in 2023) with interest from Nathan Mayer Rothschild and Moses Montefiore which was subsequently paid off by the British taxpayers (ending in 2015). Carrington was associated with three different claims, two of which were successful; he owned 268 slaves in Jamaica and received a £4,908 payment at the time (worth £483,401 in 2023).

== Family ==
Carrington's first wife, Anne (née Boldero-Barnard), died in 1827. He married, secondly, Charlotte Hudson (1770–1849), daughter of John Hudson and Susanna Trevelyan, in 1836. He was 83, she was 65. He died in September 1838, aged 86. By his first wife he had one son and five daughters. He was succeeded in his titles by his son Robert, who changed his last name to Carrington the next year.

=== Issue ===
	Life span	Marriage(s)	Notes
by Anne Boldero-Barnard
Hon. Catherine Lucy Smith	Died 1843	Married Philip Stanhope, Viscount Mahon (later 4th Earl Stanhope), son of Charles Stanhope, 3rd Earl Stanhope, and Louisa Grenville; had issue.	
Hon. Hester Frances Smith	Died 1854	Married Rt Hon. Sir Henry Williams-Wynn, son of Sir Watkin Williams-Wynn, 4th Baronet, and Charlotte Grenville; had issue.	Sir Henry was a second cousin of his brother-in-law Viscount Mahon above.
Hon. Emily Smith	Died 1869	Married Rt Hon. Lord Granville Somerset, son of Henry Somerset, 6th Duke of Beaufort, and Lady Charlotte Leveson-Gower; had issue.	
Hon. Charlotte Elizabeth Smith	Died 1811	Married Admiral Alan Gardner, 2nd Baron Gardner, son of Admiral Alan Gardner, 1st Baron Gardner, and Susannah Hyde Gale; had issue.	
Hon. Harriet Smith	Died 1856	Married Col. John Frederick Crewe, son of Maj. Gen. Richard Crewe and Milborough Allpress; had issue.	
Hon. Robert John Smith, later 2nd Baron Carrington	1796–1868	Married, firstly, Hon. Elizabeth Weld-Forester, daughter of Cecil Weld-Forester, 1st Baron Forester, and Lady Katherine Manners; had issue.	The 2nd Baron changed his last name to Carrington by royal licence in 1839.
Hon. Robert John Smith, later 2nd Baron Carrington	1796–1868	Married, secondly, Hon. Charlotte Drummond-Willoughby, daughter of Peter Drummond-Burrell, 22nd Baron Willoughby de Eresby, and Lady Sarah Drummond; had issue.	The 2nd Baron changed his last name to Carrington by royal licence in 1839.

Parliament of Great Britain
Preceded by William Howe; Abel Smith	Member of Parliament for Nottingham; 1779–1797; With: William Howe 1779–1780; Daniel Parker Coke 1780–1797	Succeeded by Daniel Parker Coke; Sir John Borlase Warren
Peerage of Ireland
New creation	Baron Carrington; 2nd creation 1796–1838	Succeeded by Robert Carrington
Peerage of Great Britain
New creation	Baron Carrington; 3rd creation 1797–1838; Member of the House of Lords (1797–1838)	Succeeded by Robert Carrington
