= West Wycombe =

Village in Buckinghamshire, England

Coordinates: 51.643143°N 0.799635°W

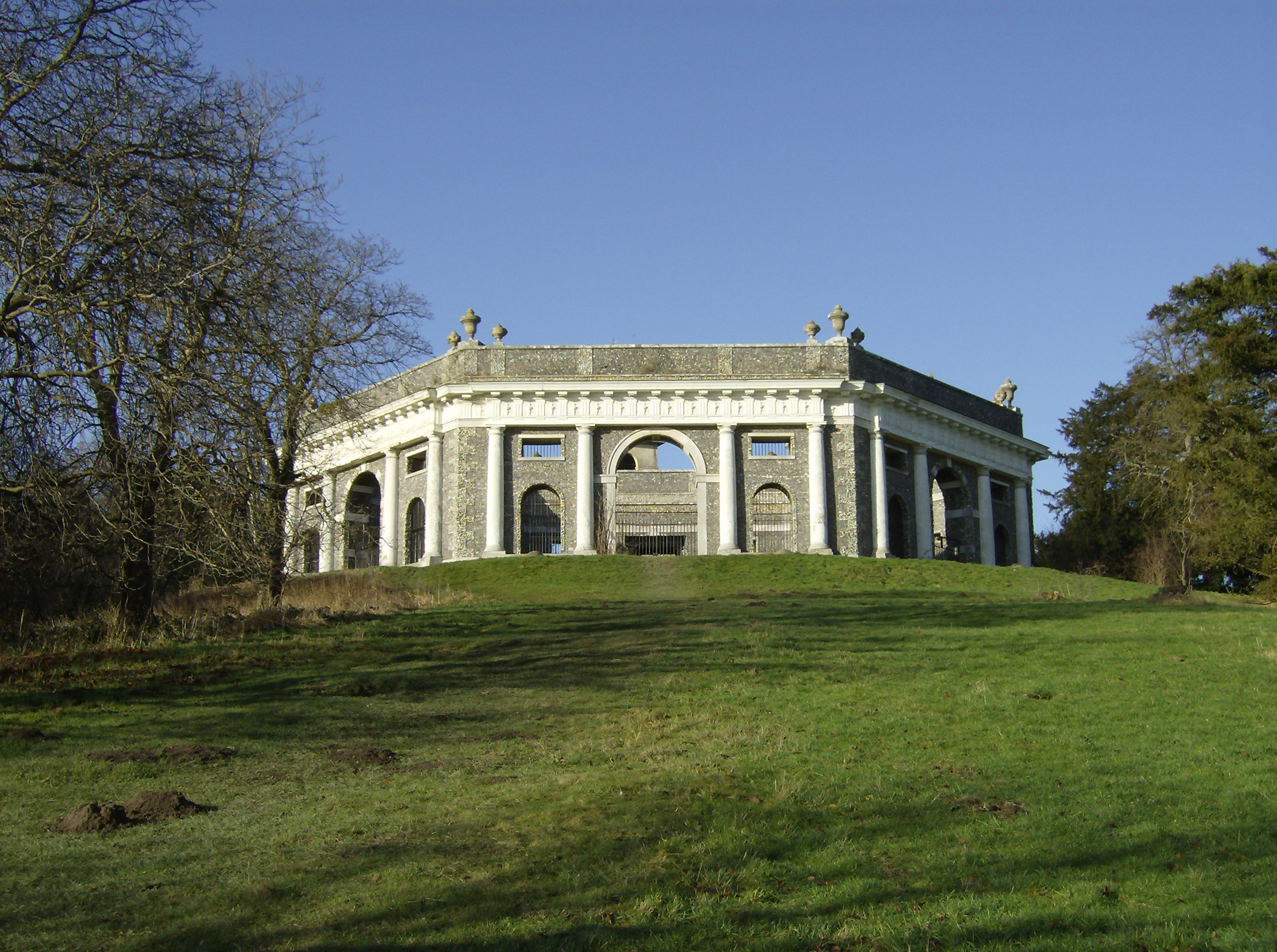
- The Mausoleum on West Wycombe Hill

- Location within Buckinghamshire
- Population: 1,345 (2011 census)
- OS grid reference: SU830945
- Civil parish: West Wycombe
- Unitary authority: Buckinghamshire
- Ceremonial county: Buckinghamshire
- Region: South East
- Country: England
- Sovereign state: United Kingdom
- Post town: HIGH WYCOMBE
- Postcode district: HP14
- Dialling code: 01494
- Police: Thames Valley
- Fire: Buckinghamshire
- Ambulance: South Central
- UK Parliament: Wycombe

West Wycombe is a small village and civil parish in Buckinghamshire, England, known for its manor houses and hills. It is 3 miles (4.8 km) west of High Wycombe.

The historic village is largely a National Trust property and receives a large annual influx of tourists visiting West Wycombe Park, West Wycombe Caves and the Mausoleum on top of West Wycombe Hill. The Mausoleum and Golden Ball above West Wycombe village are local landmarks.

West Wycombe Park, Caves, Mausoleum and St Lawrence's Church were all constructed in the mid-18th century by Sir Francis Dashwood, founder of the Dilettanti Society and co-founder of the Hellfire Club.

== History ==
=== Early history ===
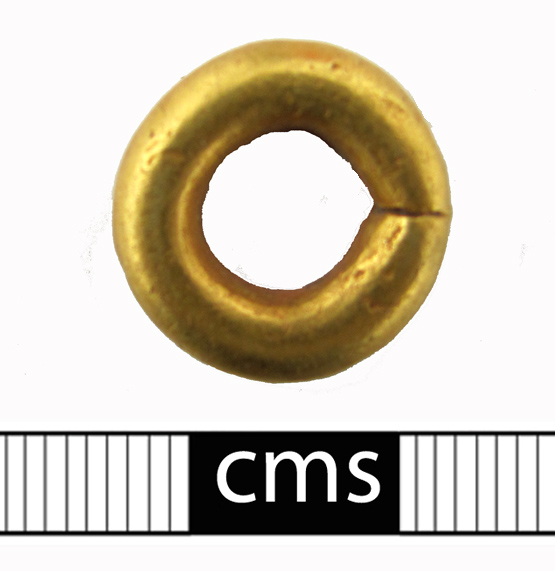
A gold, Bronze Age penannular ring found in West Wycombe in 1985

The hill above West Wycombe (now the site of St Lawrence's Church and the Mausoleum) has been continuously inhabited for centuries. A Bronze Age settlement is widely believed to have existed here, and research suggests there was a pagan temple in a similar style to Stonehenge. The earliest known settlement is an Iron Age ditch and rampart contour camp dating from the fourth or fifth century BC. A Roman settlement later occupied West Wycombe Hill, and local historians believe a temple was constructed here (though the exact site remains unknown).

=== The lost village of Haveringdon ===
During the Saxon era, the hillside was once again occupied, and the newly established settlement was named Hæferingdune (Hill of Hæfer's people in Old English). The name later evolved into Haveringdon. The site retained religious importance: a church is said to have been erected by St Birinus (who had become the bishop of the West Saxons in AD 634). A Norman watch tower is also said to have been built on top of the hill.

Haveringdon's population is believed to have been greatly reduced by the Bubonic Plague (Black Death) in the 1340s. By the 18th century the village had been resited in the valley along the Oxford Road, and renamed due to its geographical features and position: "West" because it was west of High Wycombe. Both settlements are in the Wye Valley and the word "Combe" derives from the Old English/Brythonic word for "valley". According to local records, there were only two ratepayers left in Haveringdon in the 19th century.

=== The era of Georgians ===
In the mid 18th century Sir Francis Dashwood commissioned a project to supply chalk for a three-mile straight road between West Wycombe and High Wycombe, now part of the A40 road, then a prominent trade route between London, Oxford, and Gloucester and onward to South Wales. The local chalk cave which had been in the village since prehistoric times was expanded into an elaborate network of tunnels and passages. The design of the caves was mostly inspired by Dashwood's Grand Tour of Italy, Greece and the Ottoman Empire. Local villagers, impoverished after a series of harvest failures, were paid a shilling per day to tunnel underground to mine chalk. The caves were excavated by hand and today they are viewed as a feat of engineering.

Dashwood's family home, West Wycombe House, underwent major alterations at this time. Although Haveringdon had all but disappeared by then, the church and tower had remained and a centre section was built to join the two together. The Mausoleum was also constructed, based on the design of the Constantine Arch in Rome. The new church was named Saint Lawrence's, as it was common for churches built on pagan sites to have this name. The church and Mausoleum were also built using chalk and flint from the caves.

During this time, Dashwood and other politicians and society members formed a club then known as The Knights of St. Francis (which was later named as the Hellfire Club by a London newspaper). They first used Medmenham Abbey, eight miles away from West Wycombe on the River Thames, but the caves were later used for the club's meetings. The club was notorious but had disbanded by 1763 (according to church records). The caves fell into disuse and disrepair.

=== West Wycombe in the 20th century ===
In 1929 West Wycombe village was put up for sale by the Dashwood family to raise cash following that year's Wall Street crash. It was bought in its entirety by the Royal Society for the Encouragement of Arts, Manufactures and Commerce (better known as the Royal Society of Arts, or simply the RSA) as part of the Society's "Campaign for the Preservation of Ancient Cottages". In 1934, after extensive repairs, the Society handed the property over to the National Trust. The National Trust markets this property under the name 'West Wycombe Village and Hill'. The property features many buildings of architectural value which were built between the 16th and 18th centuries.

Between 1862 and 1958 the village was served by West Wycombe railway station, to the east of the village, on the Chiltern Main Line between London and Birmingham.

In the late 1940s and early 1950s the caves underwent extensive repairs under the auspices of the Dashwood family and were turned into a tourist attraction. The profit earned was used to renovate the dilapidated West Wycombe Park. The caves continue to thrive as a tourist attraction today and have received more than two million visitors since their reopening in 1951.

== West Wycombe today ==
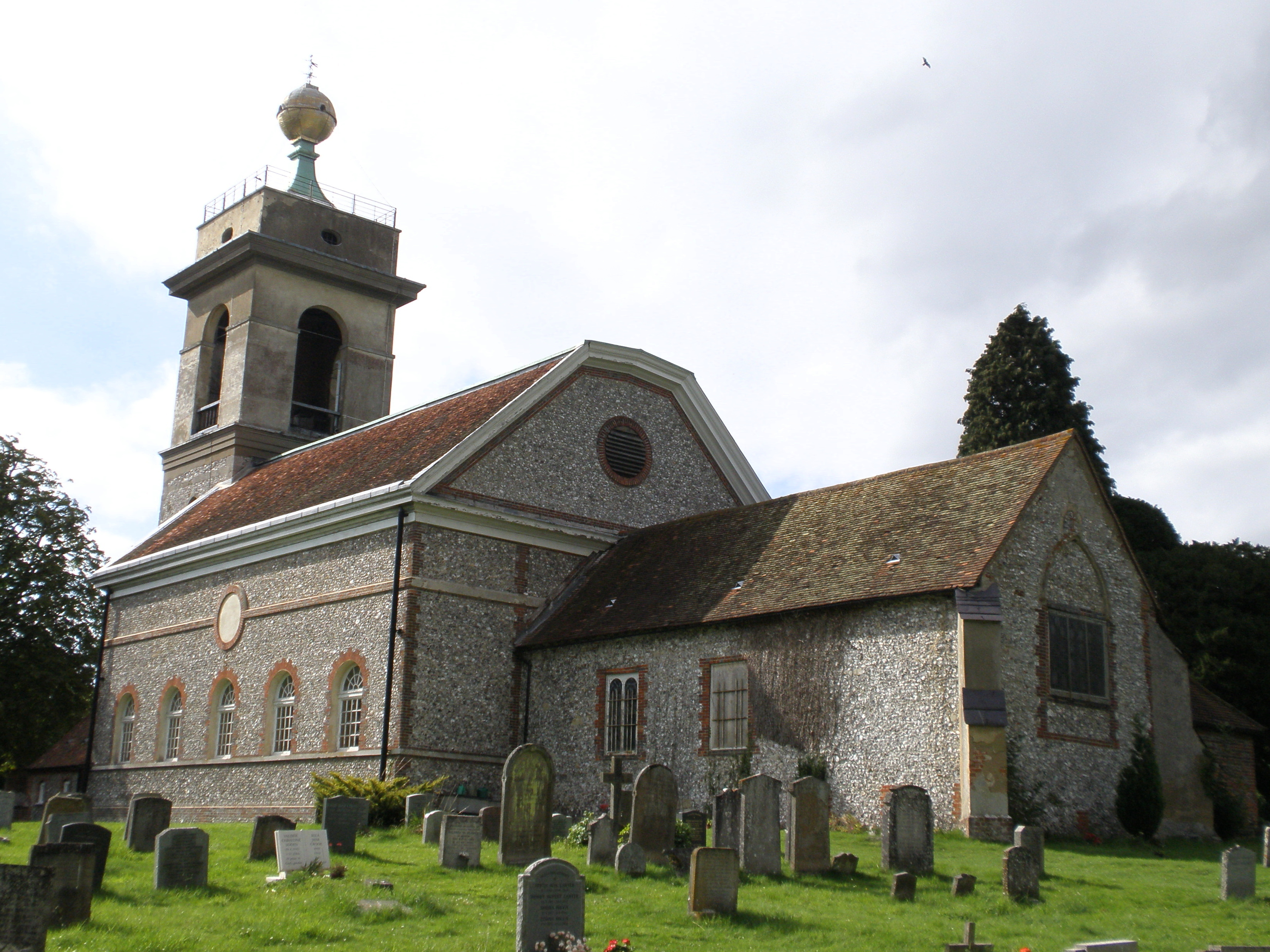
St Lawrence's Church with its golden ball

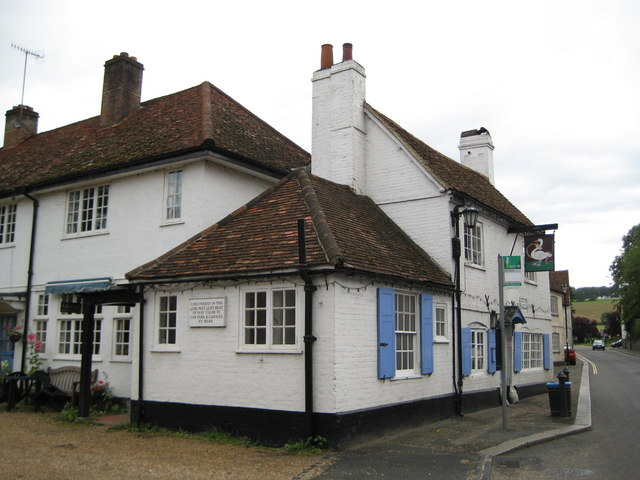
The Swan pub

Although on the busy A40, the village centre retains much of its historical charm. It is mainly owned by the National Trust, and so has resisted modernisation. The High Street has a number of shops, three pubs, some small offices and a well-used village hall. Just off the High Street is the village primary school (Reception to Year 6), a traditional furniture maker and a band hall. The population is around 1,300.

St Lawrence's Church, formerly a medieval building, was rebuilt between 1752 and 1762 for Sir Francis Dashwood by the architect John Donowell. The interior was inspired by the Temple of the Sun at Palmyra; the church tower is topped by a large golden globe which originally contained seating for eight people.

The Swan is a Grade II listed public house. It is on the Campaign for Real Ale's National Inventory of Historic Pub Interiors. Built in the 18th century, The Swan was refitted and extended in 1932 by Wheelers Wycombe brewery.

West Wycombe is also a civil parish in Wycombe district.

== See also ==
- West Wycombe Park
- West Wycombe Caves
- West Wycombe Park Polo Club
