= Francis Dashwood, 11th Baron le Despencer =

British politician (1708–1781)

The Right Honourable The Lord le Despencer PC FRS
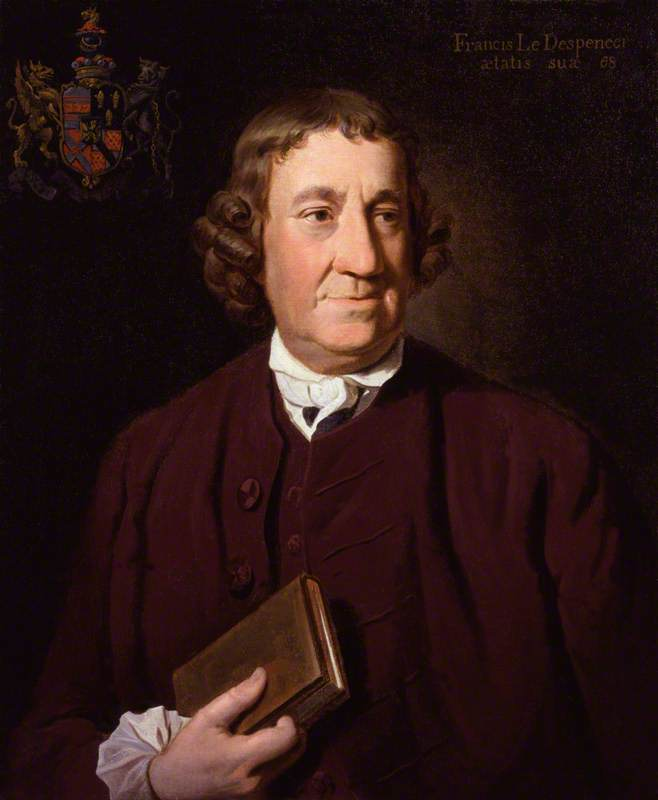

2nd Postmaster-General
- In office 1765–1781
- Prime Minister: Various
- Preceded by: The Earl of Bessborough
- Succeeded by: The Viscount Barrington

Master of the Great Wardrobe
- In office 1763–1765
- Monarch: George III
- Preceded by: The Earl Gower
- Succeeded by: The Earl of Ashburnham

Chancellor of the Exchequer
- In office 1762–1763
- Prime Minister: The Earl of Bute
- Preceded by: The Viscount Barrington
- Succeeded by: George Grenville

Treasurer of the Chamber
- In office 1761–1762
- Monarch: George III
- Preceded by: Charles Townshend
- Succeeded by: Sir Gilbert Elliot

Member of Parliament for New Romney
- In office 1741–1761
- Preceded by: Sir Robert Austen
- Succeeded by: Thomas Knight

Personal details
- Born: December 1708 Westminster, Middlesex, England
- Died: 1 December 1781 (aged 72–73) West Wycombe, Buckinghamshire, England
- Party: Tory
- Spouse: Sarah Gould (m. 1745)
- Children: Rachel Fanny Antonina Lee (illegitimate)
- Parent(s): Sir Francis Dashwood, 1st Baronet; Lady Mary Fane
- Education: Eton College

Francis Dashwood, 11th Baron le Despencer, PC, FRS (December 1708 – 11 December 1781) was an English politician and rake, Chancellor of the Exchequer (1762–1763) and founder of the Hellfire Club.

== Life and career ==
=== Early life ===
Dashwood was born in Great Marlborough Street, London, in December 1708. (Note: Dashwood was baptised in St Botolph-without-Bishopsgate on 23 December 1708.) He was the only son of Sir Francis Dashwood, 1st Baronet, and his second wife Mary, eldest daughter of Vere Fane, 4th Earl of Westmorland. (Note: Francis Dashwood's father, Sir Francis Dashwood, 1st Baronet, married four times; his second wife was Mary, the eldest daughter of Vere Fane, 4th Earl of Westmorland, Baron Le Despencer and Burghersh.)

Sir Francis and Mary had two children: a son, Francis, and a daughter, Rachael. Sir Francis also had two surviving daughters from his first marriage, and later two daughters and two sons from his third.

Dashwood was educated at Eton College where he became associated with William Pitt the Elder. Upon the death of his father in 1724, Dashwood, who was only fifteen, inherited his father's estates and the Baronetcy of Dashwood of West Wycombe. (Note: When the 7th Earl of Westmorland died childless, the Earldom of Westmorland passed to Thomas Fane, a direct male descendant of the 1st Earl. The title of Baron le Despencer, passed through his mother Mary to Francis Dashwood. (Note: John Fane had died without issue in 1762. The barony of le Despencer fell to Dashwood. The earldom of Westmorland went to Thomas Fane of Bristol, a merchant.(Debrett 1820, 160)))

=== Travels ===
Dashwood spent his youth and early adulthood abroad, gaining a reputation for notoriety while travelling around Europe. He impersonated Charles XII of Sweden while in Russia and attempted to seduce Anna Ioannovna. Dashwood was later expelled from the Papal States.

Dashwood's journeys abroad included classical aspects of the European Grand Tour. He travelled to France and Germany for several months in 1726. He went abroad again from 1729 to 1731 and visited Italy during this time. He later returned to Italy between 1739 and 1741, staying in Florence and Rome and visiting Livorno and the excavations at Herculaneum.

While in Italy he befriended the philosopher and theologian Antonio Niccolini. In 1733, between his visits to Italy, Dashwood accompanied George, Lord Forbes, to St Petersburg, stopping on the way at Copenhagen.

=== Dilettanti Society and the Divan Club ===
In 1732, Dashwood formed a dining club called the Society of Dilettanti with around 40 charter members who had returned from their travels with an appreciation of classical art. William Hogarth drew Sir Francis Dashwood at his Devotions for Dilettante Viscount Boyne. "[I]f not the actual projector and founder of the Dilettanti Society, he was certainly its leading member in 1736". Dashwood took a prominent part in the proceedings of the Dilettanti Society, and in 1742 George Knapton painted his portrait for the Society. On 2 March 1746, when John Montagu, 4th Earl of Sandwich, was suspended from his office of archmaster for "his misbehaviour to and contempt of the Society", Dashwood was elected in his place. Dashwood presented to King George II various petitions from the Dilettanti Society when it was seeking a permanent location.

In 1740, Dashwood was in Florence with Horace Walpole, Gray, and others, and shortly afterwards, got into trouble with Sir Horace Mann. In 1743 Horace Walpole critically described the Dilettanti Society as "a club for which the nominal qualification is having been to Italy, and the real one, being drunk; the two chiefs are Lord Middlesex and Sir Francis Dashwood, who were seldom sober the whole time they were in Italy".

However, the society did increasingly have a serious side, and Dashwood's work resulted in his election as a Fellow of the Royal Society (FRS) in June 1746, and a fellow of the Society of Antiquaries of London (FSA) in June 1769. He also became a member of the Lincoln Club in the mid-1740s and the Society for the Encouragement of Arts, Manufactures, and Commerce in 1754. He had connections with the Spalding Society and became vice-president of both the Foundling Hospital and the General Medical Asylum.

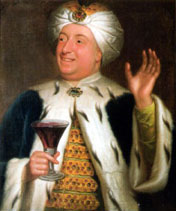
Dashwood in Divan Club attire

In 1744, he and John Montagu founded the short-lived Divan Club for those who had visited the Ottoman Empire to share their experiences, but this club was disbanded two years later.

=== Politics ===
On Dashwood's return to England, he obtained a minor post in the household of Frederick Lewis, Prince of Wales. This connection, coupled with the dismissal of his uncle, the Earl of Westmorland, from his colonelcy of the first troop of horse guards, made Dashwood a violent opponent of Robert Walpole's administration. He sponsored George Dodington, 1st Baron Melcombe's membership of the Dilettanti.

During the general election of 1741 Dashwood fought vigorously against Walpole's supporters and secured a seat for himself at New Romney on 5 May. In Parliament he followed Samuel Sandys, 1st Baron Sandys and vehemently attacked Sir Robert Walpole, declaring that abroad he was looked upon with contempt. Walpole's fall made no difference to Dashwood's position, and as a courtier of Frederick Lewis he was in opposition to all of George II's governments.

In 1747 he introduced a poor-relief bill that recommended commissioning public works (such as the Hellfire Caves he later had excavated at West Wycombe Park) to combat unemployment. The bill failed.

Dashwood was re-elected for New Romney on 26 June 1747, and in January 1751 disavowed Jacobitism, of which Andrew Stone and others of the household of George, Prince of Wales, were suspected. Dashwood supported the influence of George Dodington and opposed the Regency Bill of 15 May 1751. On 13 April 1749 he was created Doctor of Civil Law of Oxford University, and on 19 June 1746 he was elected a Fellow of the Royal Society

=== The Hellfire Club ===
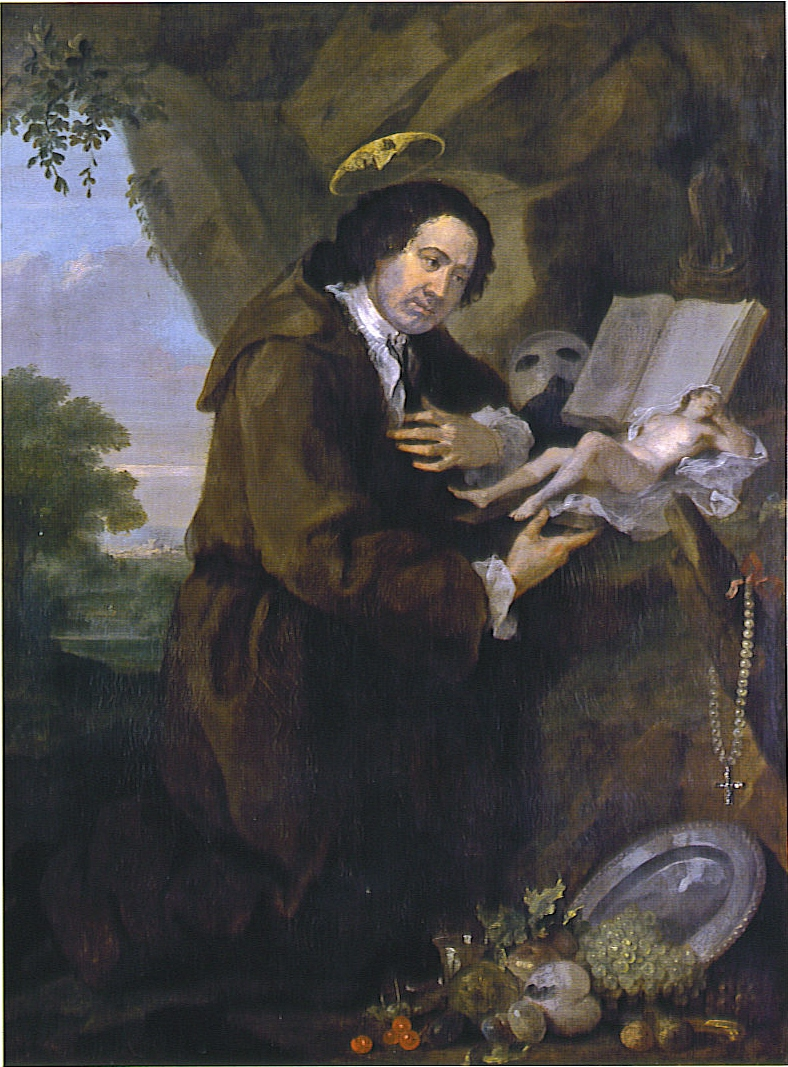
Portrait by William Hogarth from the late 1750s, parodying Renaissance images of Francis of Assisi. The bible has been replaced by a copy of the erotic novel Elegantiae Latini sermonis, and the profile of his friend Lord Sandwich peers from the halo. (Note: Dashwood's portrait, painted by George Knapton, belongs to the Dilettanti Society; he is represented as one of the monks of Medmenham, holding a goblet inscribed "Matri Sanctorum", and in an attitude of devotion before a figure of the Venus de' Medici; the motive of the picture is "both indecorous and profane" Another portrait of Dashwood, by Hogarth, has been engraved. A third portrait, by an unknown artist, belonged to Viscount Dillon at Ditchley in 1900; it is reproduced in Barker's edition of Walpole's Memoirs of George III.)

Dashwood was too young to have been a member of the first Hellfire Club, founded by Philip, Duke of Wharton in 1719 and disbanded in 1721, but he and John Montagu are alleged to have been members of a Hellfire Club that met at the George and Vulture Inn throughout the 1730s. It was again at the George and Vulture that in 1746 Dashwood founded the precursor of his own Hellfire Club, a group called the "Knights of St. Francis". This was a parody of a religious order, based on a pun upon his own name and that of the medieval Italian saint, Francis of Assisi.

Dashwood first had the idea of founding a parody of the Franciscan order when he returned from one of his Grand Tours, around 1731. He had visited various monastic communities in Europe, "founded, as it were, in direct contradiction to Nature and Reason", and he thought that by founding "a burlesque Institution in the name of St Francis", he could substitute "convivial gaiety, unrestrained hilarity, and social felicity [...] in lieu of the austerities and abstemiousness there practised."

In 1752, he moved the group's headquarters to his family home in West Wycombe, holding the first meeting on Walpurgis Night. The group was now known as "the Order of the Friars of St. Francis of Wycombe". The group subsequently moved their meetings to Medmenham Abbey, about 6 miles from West Wycombe, where they called themselves the "Monks of Medmenham".

Medmenham Abbey had been built by the Cistercian Order and was situated on the banks of the Thames near Marlow, Buckinghamshire. It was owned by Francis Duffield, from whom it was rented by Dashwood, his half-brother Sir John Dashwood-King, his cousin Sir Thomas Stapleton, the satirist Paul Whitehead, and John Wilkes. The men frequently went to Medmenham Abbey during the summer. They had the buildings restored by the architect Nicholas Revett in the style of the 18th-century Gothic Revival. Hogarth may have painted murals for this building but none survive.

The members included "Frederick, Prince of Wales, the Duke of Queensberry, the Earl of Bute, Lord Melcombe, Sir William Stanhope, K.B, Sir John Dashwood-King, bart., Sir Francis Delaval, K.B., Sir John Vanluttan, kt., Henry Vansittart, Benjamin Franklin [...] and Paul [Whitehead] the poet". Meetings occurred twice a month, with an annual general meeting lasting a week or more in June or September.

According to Horace Walpole, who visited the abbey, the members' "practice was rigorously pagan: Bacchus and Venus were the deities to whom they almost publicly sacrificed; and the nymphs and the hogsheads [casks of spirits] that were laid in against the festivals of this new church, sufficiently informed the neighbourhood of the complexion of those hermits." Over the grand entrance to the abbey was placed, in stained glass, the famous inscription on Rabelais' abbey of Theleme, "Fay ce que voudras" [do what thou wilt]. Dashwood's garden at West Wycombe contained numerous statues and shrines to different gods: Daphne and Flora, Priapus, Venus and Dionysus. The members addressed each other as "Brothers" and the leader, which changed regularly, as "Abbot". During meetings members supposedly wore ritual clothing: white trousers, jacket and cap, while the "Abbot" wore a red ensemble of the same style. Prostitutes were supposedly referred to as "nuns". Club meetings were said to have included mock rituals, items of a pornographic nature, much drinking, "wenching" and banqueting. The "monks" were said to have performed obscene parodies of Christian rites, as well as orgies of drunkenness and debauchery in which Dashwood used a communion cup to pour out libations to heathen deities. These details, possibly embellished, were described in a contemporary novel by the Anglo-Irish satirist Charles Johnstone.

As a contrast to the frivolity of Medmenham Abbey, Dashwood erected a church on a neighbouring hill. Charles Churchill, who previously labeled Dashwood "a disgrace to manhood" over his actions at Medmenham Abbey, and John Wilkes criticized this, implying it to be disingenuous. Wilkes wrote that the church was "built on the top of a hill for the convenience and devotion of the town at the bottom of it".

=== Later political career ===
In 1754, Dashwood was re-elected to parliament for New Romney, and when the Buckinghamshire Militia was reformed in 1759 during the Seven Years' War, Dashwood was appointed as its colonel with Wilkes and George Grenville among the captains. In the same year, he attempted to prevent Admiral John Byng's execution.

On 28 March 1761, he found a new seat in Parliament for Weymouth and Melcombe Regis; he was re-elected on 9 June 1762 on his appointment as Chancellor of the Exchequer, which he owed to his dependence upon the Prime Minister, John Stuart, 3rd Earl of Bute. Dashwood's ability in government was criticized: "Of financial knowledge he did not possess the rudiments, and his ignorance was all the more conspicuous from the great financial ability of his predecessor Legge. His budget speech was so confused and incapable that it was received with shouts of laughter. An excise of four shillings in the hogshead, to be paid by the grower, which he imposed on cider and perry, raised a resistance through the cider counties hardly less furious than that which had been directed against the excise scheme of Walpole". Dashwood and the Prime Minister resigned from the ministry on 8 April 1763. Dashwood received the sinecure Keepership of the Wardrobe.

In 1763, Dashwood was summoned to Parliament as 11th Baron le Despencer. He inherited the barony after the death of his uncle, John Fane, 7th Earl of Westmorland and 10th Baron le Despencer.

By 1763 Dashwood was premier baronet of England, and he was made Lord-Lieutenant of Buckinghamshire, appointing John Wilkes to succeeded him in the colonelcy of the militia. As Lord le Despencer, his public image became less associated with his past controversial actions. He joined John Montagu in levelling obscenity charges against Wilkes for writing a pornographic poem, An Essay on Woman. During Lord North's administration from 1770 to 1781, Dashwood was joint Postmaster General. Dashwood died at West Wycombe after a long illness on 11 December 1781. He was buried in the mausoleum he had built there, next to his wife who had died on 19 January 1769.

== Family ==
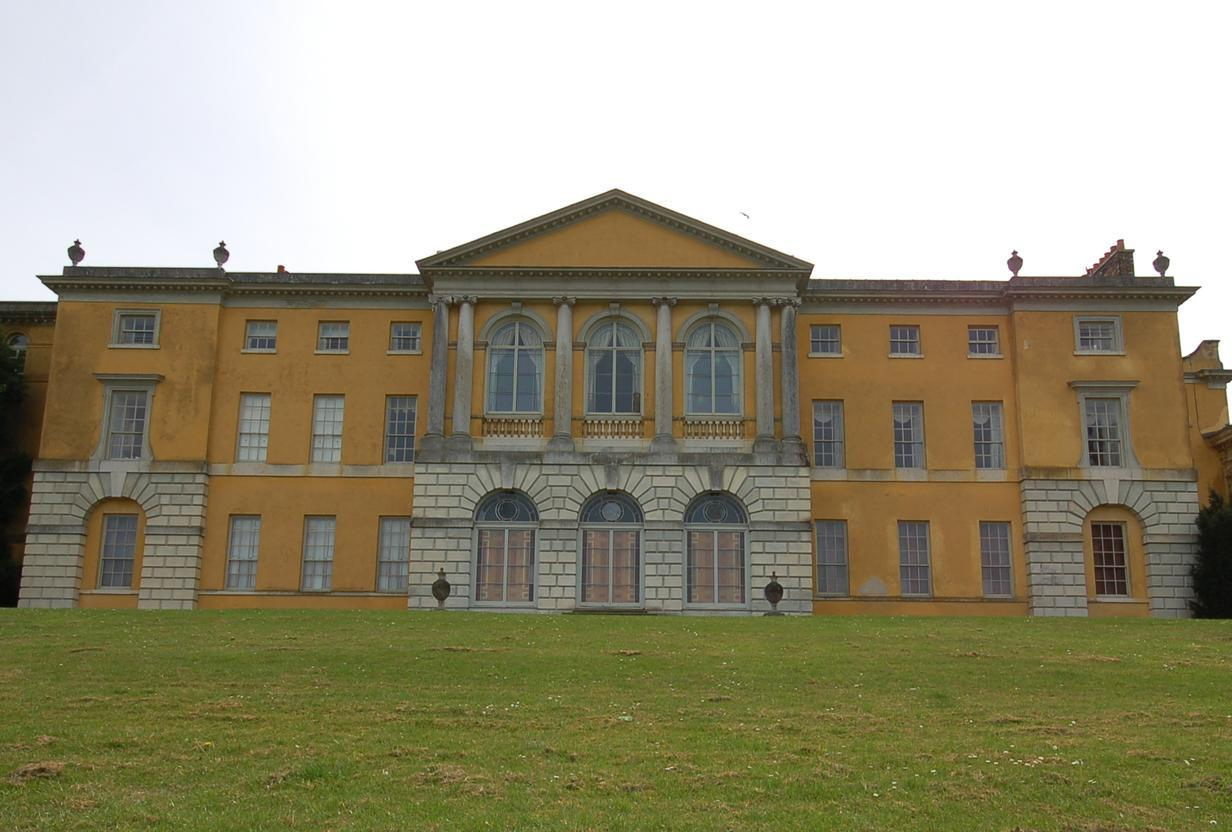
West Wycombe Park

On 19 December 1745, Dashwood married Sarah, daughter of George Gould of Iver, Buckinghamshire. Horace Walpole described her as "a poor forlorn Presbyterian prude"; The marriage had no effect upon Dashwood's profligacy; according to Wraxall he "far exceeded in licentiousness of conduct any model exhibited since Charles II".

Dashwood left no legitimate issue, and the Barony of le Despencer again fell into abeyance. His illegitimate daughter unsuccessfully claimed a right to the title. His sister Rachael illegally assumed the title Baroness le Despencer, but on her death the abeyance was once more terminated in favour of her cousin, Thomas Stapleton. After Dashwood's death, his baronetcy passed to his half-brother, Sir John Dashwood-King.

== Portrayal in literature and other media ==
Francis Dashwood has appeared in works by the following authors:

- Charles Brockden Brown in his 1798 novel Wieland describes the character Carwin as "specious seducer Dashwood."
- J. Meade Falkner in his 1895 novel The Lost Stradivarius describes the necromancer Adrian Temple as "acquainted with Francis Dashwood, the notorious Lord le Despencer ... many a winter's night saw him riding through the misty Thames meadows to the door of the sham Franciscan abbey ... of Medmenham."
- Dashwood is mentioned in a longer version of the section "The Sailor's Hornpipe" on Mike Oldfield's 1973 debut album Tubular Bells.
- Robert Anton Wilson in his 1975 The Illuminatus! Trilogy and 1980–81 Schrödinger's Cat Trilogy.
- James Herbert in the 1994 novel The Ghosts of Sleath.
- Eddie Campbell in the 1994 four-issue story arc Warped Notions for the comic book Hellblazer.
- Diana Gabaldon in her 1998 novella Lord John and the Hellfire Club.
- Kathy Reichs in the 2001 Novel Fatal Voyage.
- Carrie Bebris in her 2005 Regency novel Suspense and Sensibility.
- Mike Carey in the 2006 four-issue story arc Reasons to Be Cheerful for the comic book Hellblazer.
- Kage Baker in her 2007 short story "Hellfire at Twilight".
- Tom Knox in the 2009 novel The Genesis Secret.

== See also ==
- Dashwood baronets
- Baron le Despencer
- Dunston Pillar
- St Lawrence's Church, West Wycombe
- West Wycombe Caves
- West Wycombe Park

Parliament of Great Britain
Preceded by Stephen Bisse; Sir Robert Austen	Member of Parliament for New Romney; 1741–1761; With: Henry Furnese 1741–1756; Rose Fuller 1756–1761	Succeeded by Sir Edward Dering; Thomas Knight
Preceded by Welbore Ellis; Lord John Cavendish; George Dodington; John Tucker	Member of Parliament for Weymouth and Melcombe Regis; 1761–1763; With: John Tucker; Richard Glover; John Olmius 1761–1762; Richard Jackson 1762–1763	Succeeded by John Tucker; Richard Glover; Richard Jackson; Charles Walcott
Political offices
Preceded by The Viscount Barrington	Chancellor of the Exchequer; 1762–1763	Succeeded by George Grenville
Preceded by The Earl of Bessborough	2nd Postmaster-General; 1765–1781	Succeeded by The Viscount Barrington
Court offices
Preceded by Charles Townshend	Treasurer of the Chamber; 1761–1762	Succeeded by Sir Gilbert Elliot
Preceded by The Earl Gower	Master of the Great Wardrobe; 1763–1765	Succeeded by The Earl of Ashburnham
Honorary titles
Preceded by The Earl Temple	Lord Lieutenant of Buckinghamshire; 1763–1781	Succeeded by The Earl of Chesterfield
Peerage of England
In abeyance Title last held by John Fane	Baron le Despencer; 1763–1781	In abeyance Title next held by Thomas Stapleton
Baronetage of Great Britain
Preceded by Francis Dashwood	Baronet (of West Wycombe); 1724–1781	Succeeded by John Dashwood-King
