= Rachel Lee =

Rachel Lee may refer to:

- Sue Civil-Brown, author writing under the pseudonym "Rachel Lee"
- Rachel Lee (actress) (born 1966), also credited as Loletta Lee
- Rachel Fanny Antonina Lee, British alleged kidnap victim
- Rachel Lee (criminal), thief, member of the Bling Ring group
- Rachel Lee Priday (born 1988), violinist
