= List of garden structures at West Wycombe Park =

West Wycombe Park contains a number garden temples, pavilions and follies; many of these are listed for their architectural or historical significance:

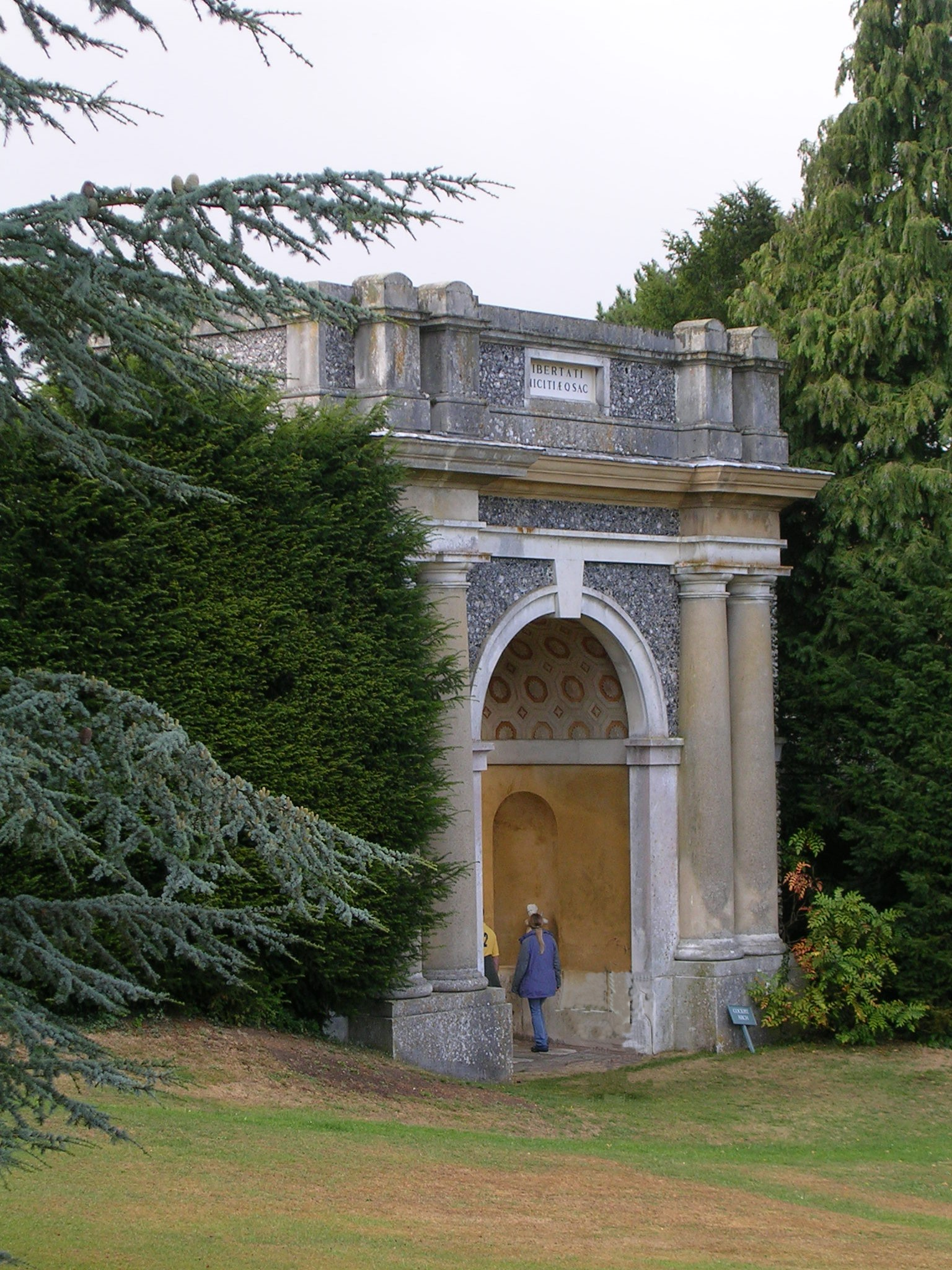
Temple of Apollo at West Wycombe Park

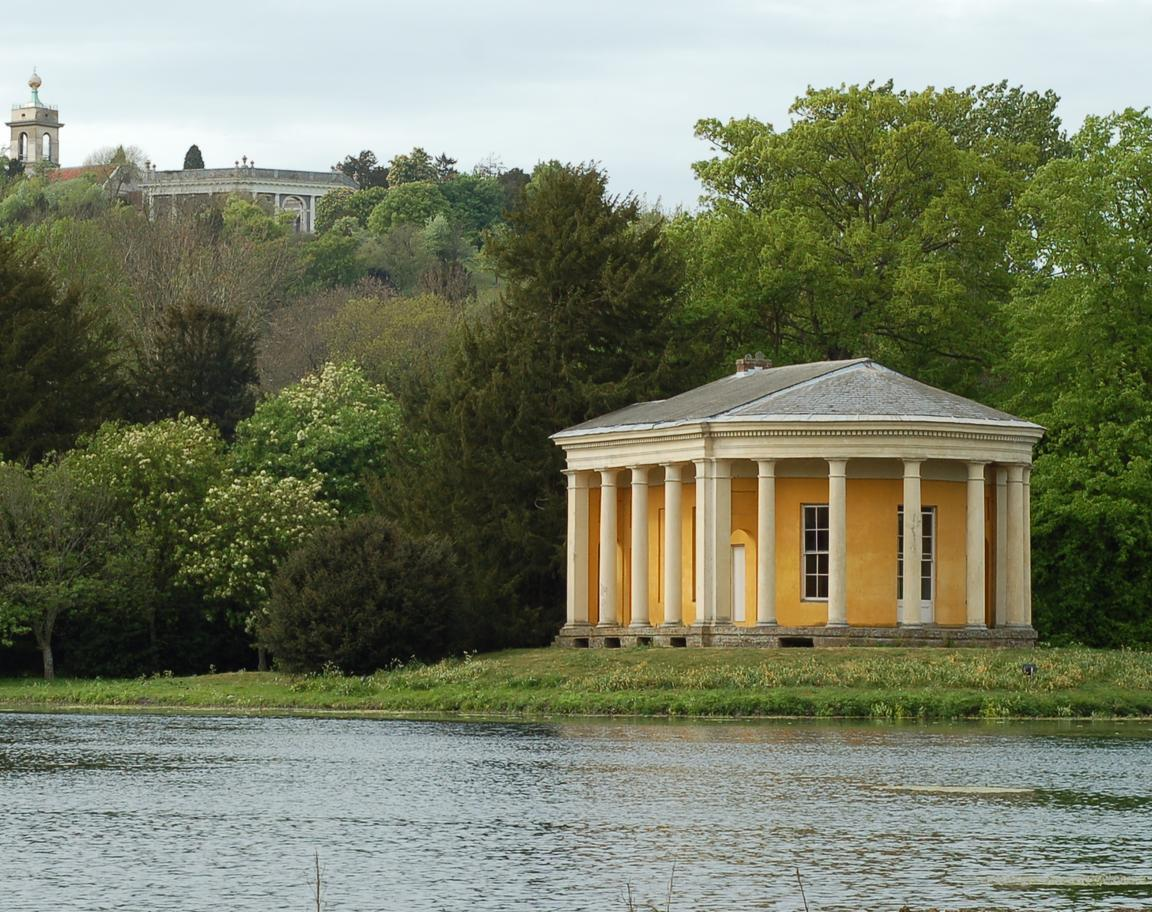
Temple of Music at West Wycombe Park

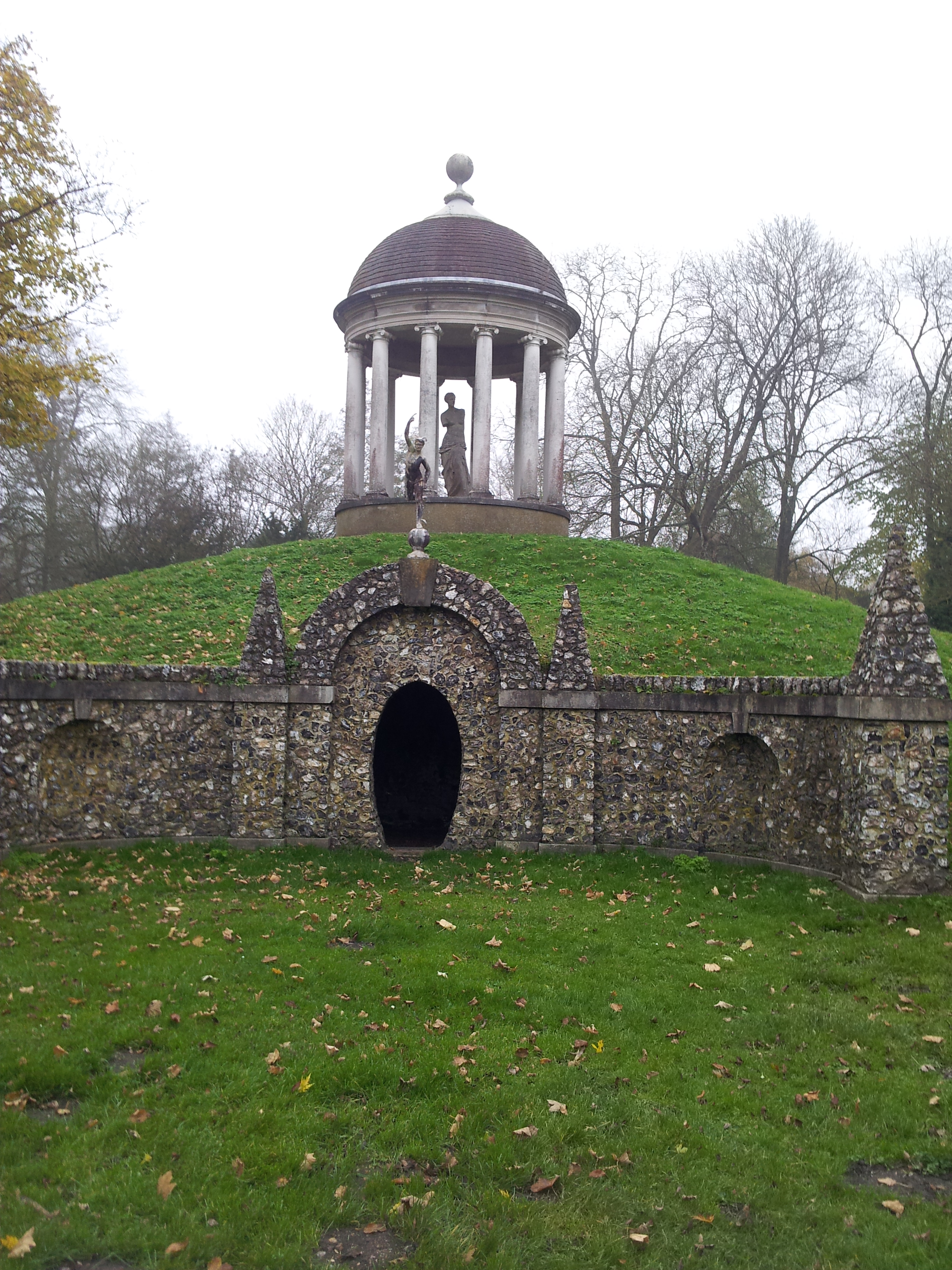
Temple of Venus at West Wycombe Park

- Boathouse
- Britannia Pillar
- Cascade (Grade II)
- Gothic Alcove
- Kittys Lodge
- North Lodge (Grade II*)
- Park Farm (private residence)
- Round Lodge
- Round Temple
- Sawmill House (private residence)
- Small Temple (Grade II*)
- 'St Crispins' (chapel)
- Temple of Apollo (Grade II*)
- Temple of Bacchus (Grade II*)
- Temple of Daphne (Grade II*)
- Temple of Diana
- Temple of Flora (Grade II*)
- Temple of Music (Grade II*)
- Temple of Venus
- Temple of the Winds (building) (Grade II*)
- Venus's Parlour
