= List of films shot at West Wycombe Park =

West Wycombe Park, an estate in Buckinghamshire, England, has been as a filming location on many occasions. Productions filmed at West Wycombe Park include:

== Television programmes ==
- Daniel Deronda (2002)
- Hex
- Most Haunted
- Trading Treasures
- Foyles War - The Hide (2010)
- Cranford (2007)
- Little Dorrit (2008)
- Agatha Christie's Marple - A Pocket Full of Rye (2009)
- Downton Abbey
- Horrible Histories (2012)
- Sense and Sensibility (2008)
- Doctor Thorne (2015)
- Taboo (2017)
- Endeavour (2017)
- Howards End (2017)
- Patrick Melrose (2018)
- The Crown (2019)
- Belgravia (2020)
- A Very British Scandal (2021)
- Renegade Nell (2024)

== Films ==
- A Clockwork Orange(1971)
- Another Country (1984)
- Dead Man's Folly (1986)
- Labyrinth (1986)
- White Hunter Black Heart (1990)
- An Ideal Husband (1999)
- The Importance of Being Earnest (2002)
- What a Girl Wants (2003)
- I Capture the Castle (2003)
- The Duchess (2008)
- W.E. (2011)
- Austenland (2011)
- X-Men: First Class (2011)
- The Counselor (2012)
- Belle (2013)
- Summer in February (2013)
- Effie Gray (2014)
- Mortdecai (2015)
- Queen of the Desert (2015)
- Pride and Prejudice and Zombies (2016)
- Bridget Jones’s Baby (2016)
- Crooked House (2017)
- The Hippopotamus (2017)
- Fast & Furious: Hobbs & Shaw (2019)
- Sense and Sensibility (2026)

== Music videos ==
- Paloma Faith - Picking Up The Pieces
