= Rachel Fanny Antonina Lee =

- Born: 1770s
- Died: 1829
- Father: Francis Dashwood, 11th Baron le Despencer

Rachel Fanny Antonina Lee or Rachel Fanny Antonina Dashwood (1770s – 1829) was a British alleged kidnapping victim.

== Life ==
Rachel Fanny Antonina Dashwood was the illegitimate daughter of Sir Francis Dashwood. Her father was Chancellor of the Exchequer and the notorious founder of the Hellfire Club. He gave her about £40,000 after she had been educated at a French convent. She was later reported to be "deplorably ignorant of English life and life universally".

Dashwood lodged for a time with a Mrs. Gordon in Kensington Square, and met her two sons, Loudoun and Lockhart, when they returned on holiday from their boarding schools. She later married Matthew Lee in Scotland as she was under age. The attraction was said to be her husband's good looks but the marriage lasted less than two years.

Mrs Lee went to live in Manchester, but she was in London in 1803 when she was kidnapped by - or went away with or eloped with - the two Gordon brothers. They had both graduated from Oxford University: Loudoun Harcourt was not rich while Lockhart was not only married but was employed as a clergyman. The circumstance of their journey together are disputed. The party of three was intercepted after concerns were raised by Lee's guardians, and Lee later sued them for her abduction. Loudoun was said to have visited her room in Gloucester, whereas Lee said that she was being threatened with a pistol.

The trial of Loudoun and Lockhart took place on 6 March 1804 in Oxford based on the accusations of Lee. Witnesses were called and the judge stopped the case after hearing that Lee did not deny saying to the chambermaid "Tell my husband he may come to bed in ten minutes". Loudoun Harcourt Gordon's account Apology for the Conduct of the Gordons... records it was abandoned when it was revealed that Lee denied the Christian faith. The accused brothers were acquitted and they claimed vindication in Loudoun's book published in 1804. The Judge ruled that during their time in Oxfordshire Lee had freely consented to travelling with the Gordon brothers. Lee now had symptoms of paranoia and because of this she felt threatened, even by the Gloucestershire clergyman who had agreed to look after her.

Despite her symptoms she published A Vindication of Mrs Lee's Conduct in 1807 and the following year she had an Essay on Government published. Matthew Lee killed himself in 1807 and she moved back to London. Over the next few years she learnt Hebrew and she continued to publish her views. She made multiple drafts of a textbook on mathematics, covering arithmetic, algebra, and geometry. She died in 1829.

== See also ==
- List of kidnappings
- List of solved missing person cases

== Works ==
Lee wrote the following:

- A Vindication of Mrs Lee's Conduct, 1807
- A circular epistle to the Hebrews by H. V. Bolaffay
- An Investigation into the conduct of Lady Anne Dashwood and of Mr Delmar with respect to Antonina the Baroness Le Despenser about her sister-in-law's alleged covetousness of her possessions, 1823
- A Statement Including Charges Against Mr Henry Yorke, 1825
- Memoirs of R. F. A. 1812
- Remarks on a Will Said to have been that of Francis Dashwood Esq. along with A Statement Containing Charges Against Mr Thomas Marshall, 1828
