= West Wycombe railway station =

Former railway station in England

Coordinates: 51.6430°N 0.7903°W

West Wycombe

General information
- Location: West Wycombe, Buckinghamshire; England
- Grid reference: SU838945
- Platforms: 2

Other information
- Status: Disused

History
- Original company: Wycombe Railway
- Pre-grouping: Great Western and Great Central Joint Railway
- Post-grouping: Great Western and Great Central Joint Railway

Key dates
- 1 August 1862: Line opens from High Wycombe to Thame
- 1 August 1862: Station opened
- 3 November 1958: Station closed
Location

West Wycombe railway station was a railway station that served the village of West Wycombe, Buckinghamshire. Situated about 1/2 mile (0.80 km) east of the village, the station opened in 1862 and closed in 1958. Minutes of the Wycombe Railway state that construction of West Wycombe station in 1862 cost £430 8s 8d, equivalent to £45,250 in 2025, with additional general works at £417 8s 8d, equivalent to £43,884 in 2025.

In the late 1980s, the then operator of the Chiltern Lines Network SouthEast suggested reopening West Wycombe station in order to ease the peak hour congestion at the main High Wycombe station. However, no detailed plans were ever published, and there has been no further suggestion of reopening the station by the current operator, the Arriva owned Chiltern Railways. Chiltern Railways has invested heavily in both infrastructure and rolling stock for the Chiltern group of lines.

== History ==
West Wycombe original station was an intermediate station on the Wycombe Railway and opened on 1 August 1862. The station was provided with a single platform and a station building of typical Wycombe Railway design which was repeated exactly at Princes Risborough and Wheatley, although other stations Cookham, Marlow Road, Wooburn Green, Loudwater and Bledlow had the same design with an additional crossing keeper's house attached.

West Wycombe station was rebuilt in 1906 and provided with a new two platform station. There are a number of photographs of both the original Wycombe railway stations taken by SWA Newton.

The Wycombe Railway had reached High Wycombe (then known simply as Wycombe) on 1 August 1854; on 1 August 1862, it was extended to Thame. The line between High Wycombe and Princes Risborough was upgraded, doubled and transferred to the new Great Western and Great Central Joint Railway, the improved line coming into use on 2 April 1906.

Passenger services were withdrawn from West Wycombe on 3 November 1958. The line remains active, and plans for reopening the station have been discussed. A reopened station would be within walking distance of a popular National Trust village, with Manor and famous Caves, and also relieve traffic in the centre of High Wycombe town by serving its extensive western suburbs.

This station has now been demolished and now has a coach car park and flats built on some of the land.

== Routes ==
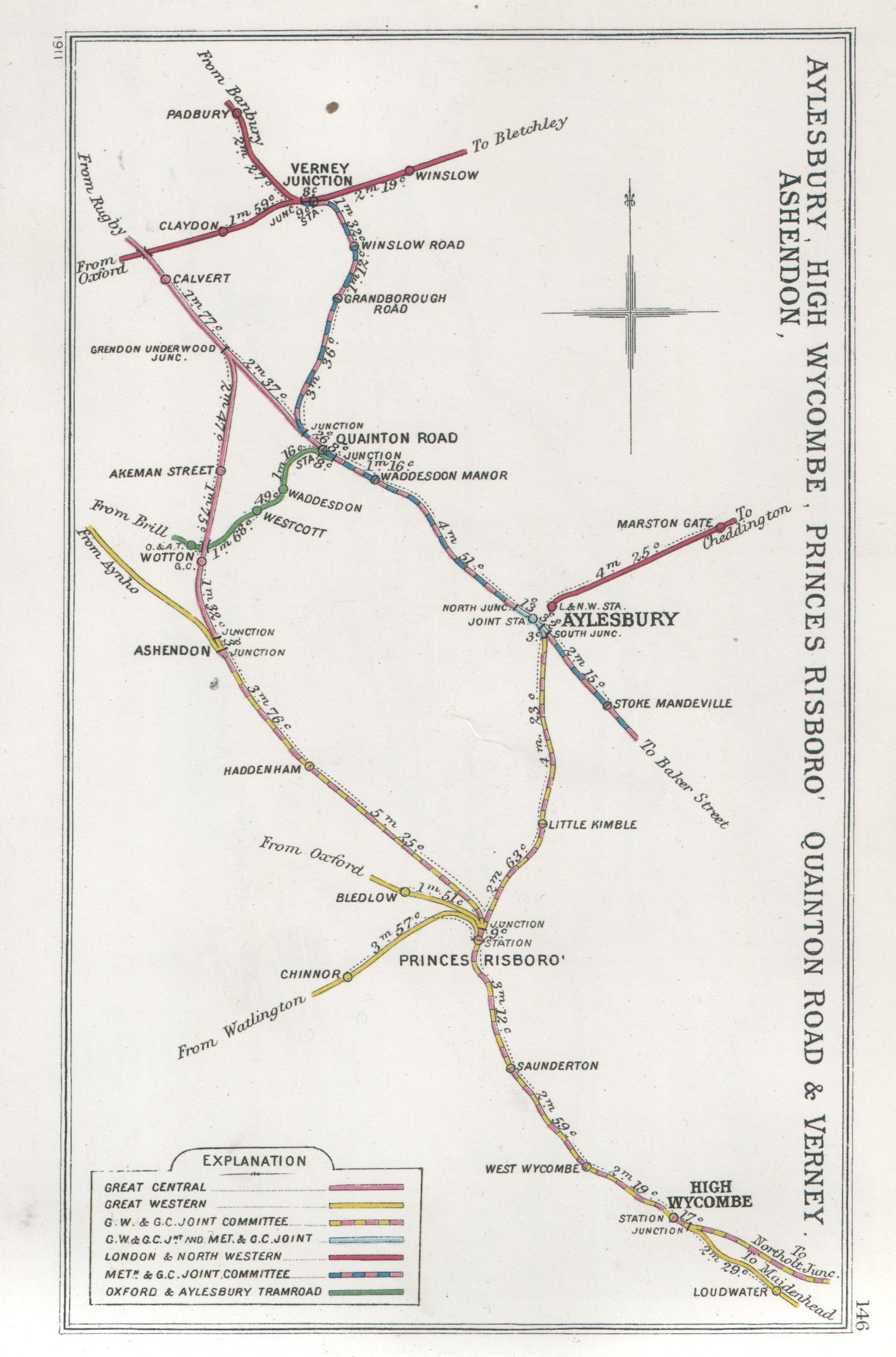
A 1911 Railway Clearing House map of railways in the vicinity of West Wycombe

| Preceding station | Historical railways | Following station |
|---|---|---|
| Saunderton; Line and station open | Great Western Railway; London-Birmingham | High Wycombe; Line and station open |
