= The Swan, West Wycombe =

Listed pub in Buckinghamshire, England

The Swan
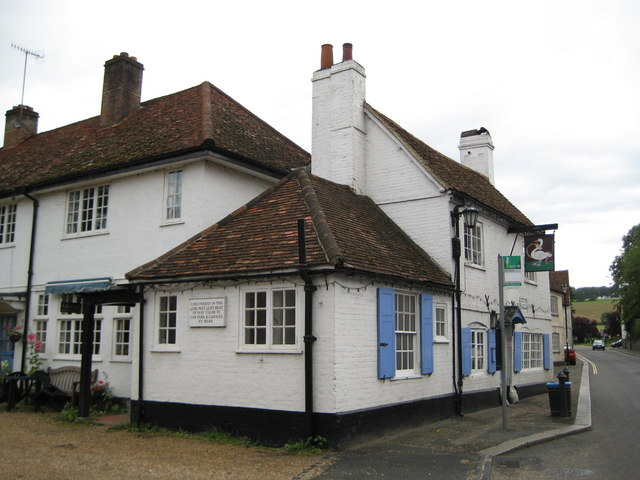
- The pub in 2008
- Alternative names: Swan Inn

General information
- Type: Public house
- Location: High Street, West Wycombe, Buckinghamshire, England
- Coordinates: 51.6444°N 0.8035°W
- Year built: 18th century
- Renovated: 1932 (refitted and extended)
- Owner: National Trust

Design and construction
- Designations

Listed Building – Grade II
- Official name: The Swan public house
- Designated: 9 January 1954
- Reference no.: 1125166

The Swan is a Grade II listed public house on High Street in West Wycombe, a village in Buckinghamshire, England. Dating from the 18th century, it is owned by the National Trust and has been operated by the same family since 1910. The pub is notable for its largely intact interior, created during a remodelling and extension by Wheelers Wycombe Brewery in 1932, and is the only Buckinghamshire entry on the Campaign for Real Ale (CAMRA)'s National Inventory of Historic Pub Interiors, where it is rated three stars and classified as being of "outstanding national historic importance".

== History ==
Built in the 18th century, The Swan has been operated by the same family since 1910. The pub was refitted and extended in 1932 by Wheelers Wycombe Brewery. The work created the present layout, with saloon and public bars arranged at right angles to one another, together with an off-sales area and dining room. Prior to the alterations, Wheelers Brewery had obtained a 99-year lease on the property. The brewery was later acquired by Simonds of Reading, after which the pub became part of the Courage estate.

As with most of West Wycombe, the public house is owned by the National Trust. On 9 January 1954, The Swan was designated a Grade II listed building. Around 1970, the Barry family acquired the lease from Courage and became direct tenants of the National Trust.

The pub is the only Buckinghamshire entry on the Campaign for Real Ale (CAMRA)'s National Inventory of Historic Pub Interiors. It was entered on the inventory before its grading system was revised; under the current scheme, it is awarded three stars and its interior is regarded as being "of outstanding national historic importance".

The property forms part of a group of historic Grade II-listed buildings on High Street, comprising outbuildings adjoining No. 2; Nos. 2–5; Nos. 7–9; the West Wycombe Branch County Library; Nos. 10–13; No. 15; Black Boy Cottage; the George and Dragon Inn; and Nos. 16–23.

== Architecture ==
=== Exterior ===
The building is constructed of colour-washed brick with an old tiled roof and brick cornice. It has two storeys, with a principal elevation of five bays. The upper floor contains two-light timber-mullioned casement windows with glazing bars, while the ground floor windows are set beneath cambered brick arches. A brick plinth and first-floor band course run across the façade. The entrance is sheltered by a gabled doorhood on brackets. To the left is a single-storey wing with a sash window and a small modern window beneath a hipped tiled roof with a matching brick cornice. A modern southern extension has been added in a sympathetic style. Outbuildings adjoin the western side of the property.

=== Interior ===
The interior largely reflects a remodelling carried out in 1932, when the pub was enlarged to create two bars arranged at right angles to one another, together with an off-sales area and dining room. The saloon bar occupies the original front part of the building and retains an inglenook fireplace, parquet flooring, a bar counter installed in 1932, and a modest bar-back with bevelled mirror panels.

The public bar also dates largely from the 1932 refurbishment and contains parquet flooring, a long counter, a bar-back with mirrored panels, and a brick fireplace with a coal stove. The servery retains curtains that can be drawn between the two bars, while casks are stillaged behind the servery for the dispensing of beer.

Other surviving features include the former jug-and-bottle department, accessed through a separate entrance, and largely intact lavatories fitted with white tiled walls and original sanitary ware. The dining room retains parquet flooring and a brick fireplace dating from the 1930s.
