= Hellfire Caves =

Network of man-made caverns in England

Coordinates: 51.6460°N 0.8026°W

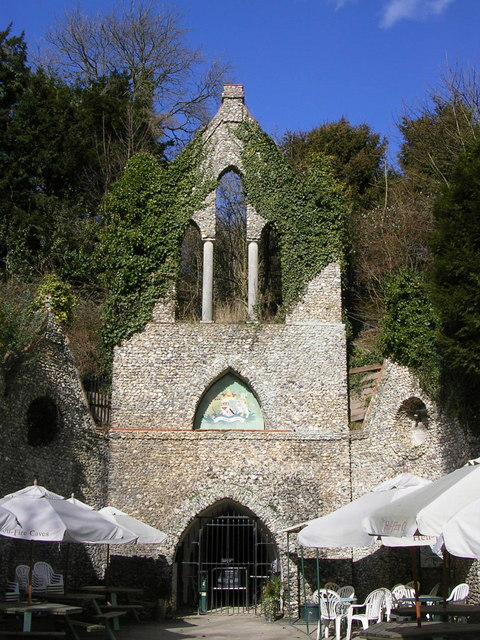
- Entrance to the caves, 2008
- Interactive map of Hellfire Caves
- Location: West Wycombe, Buckinghamshire, England
- Geology: Chalk

The Hellfire Caves (also known as the West Wycombe Caves) are a network of man-made chalk and flint caverns which extend 260m underground. They are situated above the village of West Wycombe, at the southern edge of the Chiltern Hills near High Wycombe in Buckinghamshire, South East England.

They were excavated between 1748 and 1752 for Francis Dashwood, 11th Baron le Despencer (2nd Baronet), founder of the Society of Dilettanti and co-founder of the Hellfire Club, whose meetings were held in the caves. The caves have been operating as a tourist attraction since reopening in 1951.

== Location and layout ==
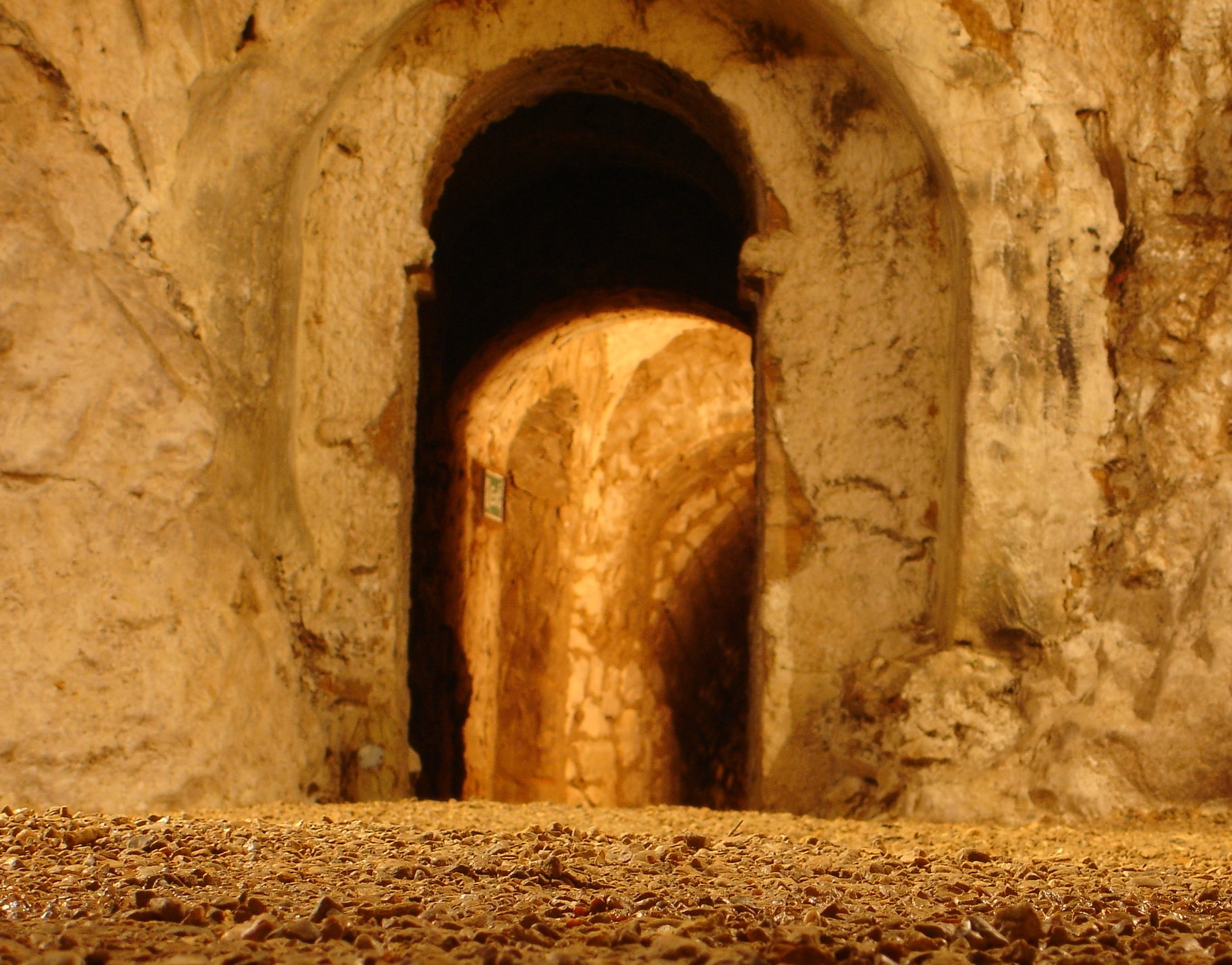
A tunnel in the Hellfire Caves

The caves run into the hillside above West Wycombe village and directly beneath St Lawrence's Church and Mausoleum (which were also constructed by Sir Francis Dashwood around the same time the caves were excavated). West Wycombe Park, ancestral seat of the Dashwood family and also a National Trust property, lies directly across the valley. This area can be viewed directly from West Wycombe House.

The unusual design of the caves was much inspired by Sir Francis Dashwood's visits to Italy, Greece, Turkey, Syria and other areas of the Ottoman Empire during his Grand Tour. The caves extend 0.25 miles (400 m) underground, with the individual caves or "chambers" connected by a series of long, narrow tunnels and passageways.

A route through the underground chambers proceeds, from the Entrance Hall, to the Steward's Chamber and Whitehead's Cave, through Lord Sandwich's Circle (named after John Montagu, 4th Earl of Sandwich), Franklin's Cave (named after Benjamin Franklin, a friend of Dashwood who visited West Wycombe), the Banqueting Hall (allegedly the largest man-made chalk cavern in the world), the Triangle, to the Miner's Cave; and finally, across a subterranean river named the River Styx, lies the final cave, the Inner Temple, where the meetings of the Hellfire Club were held, and which is said to lie 300 feet (90 m) directly beneath the church on top of West Wycombe hill. In Greek mythology, Styx separated the mortal world from Hades, and the subterranean position of the Inner Temple directly beneath St Lawrence's Church was supposed to signify Heaven and Hell.

== History ==
During the late 1740s, to try to combat local poverty, Sir Francis Dashwood commissioned an ambitious project to supply chalk for a straight three mile (5 km) road between West Wycombe and High Wycombe (then on the busy London-Oxford road, now the A40). The chalk for the road was dug out from the site of the caves, which is how the caves were created. Local farm workers, impoverished by a succession of droughts and failed harvests, were employed to carry out the work.

=== Hellfire Club ===
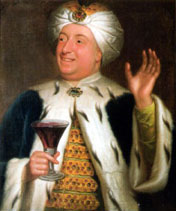
Portrait of Sir Francis Dashwood, the founder of the Knights of St Francis of Wycombe, a private members club which later became known as the notorious Hellfire Club, c. 1750

Members of a club founded by Sir Francis Dashwood included various politically and socially important 18th-century figures such as William Hogarth, John Wilkes, Thomas Potter and John Montagu, 4th Earl of Sandwich. Though not believed to have been a member, Benjamin Franklin was a close friend of Dashwood who visited the caves on more than one occasion. The Hellfire Club had previously used Medmenham Abbey, eight miles (13 km) from West Wycombe on the River Thames, as a meeting place, but the caves at West Wycombe were used for meetings in the 1750s and early 1760s. The club motto was Fais ce que tu voudras (Do what thou wilt), a philosophy of life associated with François Rabelais's fictional abbey at Thélème and later used by Aleister Crowley.

According to Horace Walpole, the members' "practice was rigorously pagan: Bacchus and Venus were the deities to whom they almost publicly sacrificed; and the nymphs and the hogsheads that were laid in against the festivals of this new church, sufficiently informed the neighbourhood of the complexion of those hermits."

While it was still operating, Sir Francis' group was not known as the Hellfire Club - this name was given much later. His club used other names, such as The Brotherhood of St. Francis of Wycombe, Order of Knights of West Wycombe, and The Order of the Friars of St. Francis of West Wycombe.

The gatherings of these powerful men who pantomimed rituals of the Catholic Church also featured drinking and orgies. Active in England in the 18th century were rumours of "highborn Devil-worshippers who mocked Church and religion and whom supped with Satan".

By the early 1760s, the club was no longer active. A local legend claims that the caves are haunted by Sukie, a young maid who was accidentally killed by people playing a practical joke on her. Others claim that the ghost of Paul Whitehead, the former steward of the Hell Fire Club, has been seen in the caves.

=== Legacy ===
During World War II, plans were made to use the caves as a large air-raid shelter if nearby towns were bombed, but Buckinghamshire's rural position meant that High Wycombe and surrounding towns were not an enemy target, and so the plans were not carried out. During the late 1940s and early 1950s the caves were renovated and turned into a local visitor attraction by the late Sir Francis Dashwood (11th Baronet).

Hellfire Caves have had more than 2.5 million visitors since reopening in 1951. The tours take visitors along passages which extend over 0.25 miles (400 m) underground past a series of chambers small to the Banqueting Hall and then to the so-called River Styx and the Inner Temple. According to the local tourist bureau, much of the profit earned by the caves has been donated to charities including the National Trust.

== In popular culture ==
- The Hellfire Caves appeared in Series 4, episode 5 of Most Haunted for an overnight vigil.
- The drama series Little Dorrit used the Hellfire caves for a prison scene.
- Horrible Histories have used the cave for a re-enactment scene.
- The cave's entrance was used in Beetlejuice Beetlejuice, doubling as the entrance to Bran Castle. Additionally, a funeral scene for the movie was filmed close by.
