= The Beggar's Benison =

Scottish gentlemen's club

The Beggar's Benison was a Scottish gentlemen's club devoted to "the convivial celebration of male sexuality". It was founded in 1732 in the town of Anstruther on the Firth of Forth and is often mentioned in descriptions of the libertine culture of 18th century Britain.

== Name ==
The full title of the club was "The Most Ancient and Most Puissant Order of the Beggar's Benison and Merryland, Anstruther", where the word Merryland is a euphemism for the female body – used often in contemporary erotic literature. The word benison means "blessing" and, according to the founders, the club's name came from a story about King James V, "the Gude-man of Ballangeich", who:

"in the disguise of a bagpiper, was journeying to the East Neuk of Fife. Failing to cross the Dreel Burn, in spate, a buxom gaberlunzie lass came to the rescue, tucked up her petticoats, and elevated her Sovereign across her hurdies to the opposite bank. Enamoured with the high favour, his Majesty in return gave the damsel her fairin' [reward] for which 'the gude-man' got her 'benison'!"

The woman blessed him with the words "May your purse ne'er be toom [empty] and your horn aye [always] in bloom". The club's motto thus became, "May prick nor purse ne'er fail you".

== Activity ==
The club was formed in 1732 but was only formally established in 1739. It existed until 1836. The club's members, drawn from the upper classes of society, dined and drank together, exchanging obscene songs and toasts. Much of their discussion revolved around sex, and there were often lectures on sex and anatomy. The club had a stock of pornography, and there were also sometimes naked "posture girls" for the members to look at. They are also thought to have indulged in rituals of collective masturbation, which formed part of the initiation ceremony.

During the initiation ceremony, a new member was "prepared" by the Recorder and two helpers in

"a closet, by causing him to propel his Penis until full erection. When thus ready he was escorted with four puffs of the Breath-Horn before the Brethren or Knighthood, and was ordered by the Sovereign to place his Genitals upon the Testing Platter, which was covered with a folded white napkin. The Members and Knights two and two came round in a state of erection and touched the Novice Penis to Penis. Thereafter the special Glass, with the Society's Insignia thereon and Medal attached, was filled with Port Wine, when the new Brother's health was heartily and humorously drunk, he was told to select an amorous Passage from the Song of Solomon and to read it aloud."

A sample entry from the club's records shows a typical meeting:

"1737. St. Andrew's Day. 24 met, 3 tested and enrolled. All frigged. The Dr. expatiated. Two nymphs [young girls], 18 and 19, exhibited as heretofore. Rules were submitted by Mr. Lumsdaine for future adoption. Fanny Hill was read. Tempest. Broke up at 3 o'clock a.m."

The club opened a chapter in Edinburgh in 1766. The Prince of Wales, later King George IV, was presented with several of the glasses and insignia of the order during a visit to Edinburgh.

A newspaper advert from 1773 has also been identified, advertising a meeting in Manchester, England. A chapter was even mooted for Saint Petersburg, Russia, but it is unknown if it actually met.

== Notable members ==
The club's founding members included some of the most influential people in the area surrounding Anstruther, including

- Lord Newark (grandson of David Leslie, Lord Newark)
- Sir Charles Erskine of Cambo, 3rd Baronet, and Thomas and John Erskine, who were probably his younger brothers
- Robert Hamilton of Kilbrackmont, a local landowner who died in poverty
- James Grahame, baillie of Anstruther Easter
- William Ayton or Aytoun of Kinaldy, landowner
- John McNachtane, customs officer, nominal chief of the dispersed Highland clan, and cousin to the 2nd earl of Breadalbane, was the club's sovereign for nearly 30 years.
- David Pollock, enforcement officer, head man, and 'over looker' of the Testing Platter ritual

Later members included:

- David Erskine, Lord Cardross and later the 2nd earl of Buchan, and founder of the Society of Antiquaries of Scotland
- William Cummying, first secretary of the Society of Antiquaries of Scotland and Lyon Clerk depute
- Hugh Cleghorn, professor of civil history at the University of St Andrews and first colonial secretary to Ceylon
- Thomas Erskine, 6th Earl of Kellie, musician
- Thomas Erskine, 9th Earl of Kellie, merchant and British consul in Gothenburg, became the club's sovereign in 1820.

Amongst honorary members was the balloonist Vincenzo Lunardi.

== Legacy ==
The club was dissolved in 1836; some of its papers and relics were retained by one of the last members, Matthew Foster Connolly, burgh clerk of Anstruther Easter and Wester, who left them to his son-in-law, the Reverend Dr J.F.S. Gordon. The remaining club money was bequeathed to fund prizes for girls at school in East Anstruther. In 1892, an unknown author published Records of the Most Ancient and Puissant Order of the Beggar's Benison and Merryland, Anstruther with photographs of many of the relics. This work was reprinted in 1982 in the Gems of British Social History Series. There was an attempt by army officer Maxwell Robert Canch Kavanagh to revive the club in 1921. Most of the relics of the club, including objects with phallic decorations, are now held in the Beggar's Benison and Wig Club collection of the University of St Andrews. In 2002, David Stevenson, emeritus professor of history at the University of St Andrews, published a scholarly book on the Beggar's Benison.

== See also ==
- Hellfire Club
- The Kennel Club
