= Charles Johnstone =

Irish novelist

- Occupation: Novelist

Charles Johnstone (c. 1719–1800) was an Irish novelist. Prevented by deafness from practising at the Irish Bar, he went to India, where he was proprietor of a newspaper. He wrote one successful book, Chrysal, or the Adventures of a Guinea, a somewhat sombre satire.

== Life ==
Born at Carrigogunnell, County Limerick about 1719, he was educated at Trinity College, Dublin, but is not known to have taken a degree. He was called to the bar, but extreme deafness prevented his practice except as a chamber lawyer, where he did not succeed. He began to write as a living.

In May 1782, Johnstone sailed for India, with a dangerous shipwreck on the voyage. He found employment in writing for the Bengal newspaper press, under the signature of "Oneiropolos". He became in time joint proprietor of a journal, and prospered. He died at Calcutta about 1800.

== Works ==
Johnstone's major work, entitled Chrysal, or the Adventures of a Guinea, and frequently reprinted, appeared in 4 vols., London, 1760–65. The first and second volumes had been written during a visit to George Edgcumbe, 3rd Baron Edgcumbe in Devon. The book, a succès de scandale, claimed to reveal political secrets, and to expose the profligacy of well-known public characters.

Johnstone was also the author of:

- The Reverie, or a Flight to the Paradise of Fools, 2 vols. London, 1762.
- The History of Arsaces, Prince of Betlis, 2 vols. 1774.
- The Pilgrim, or a Picture of Life, 2 vols. 1775.
- History of John Juniper, Esq., alias Juniper Jack, 3 vols. 1781.

== See also ==
- Hellfire Club

== Notes ==
Attribution

This article incorporates text from a publication now in the public domain: Lee, Sidney, ed. (1892). "Johnstone, Charles". Dictionary of National Biography. Vol. 30. London: Smith, Elder & Co.
