= West Wycombe Park Polo Club =

HPA-affiliated polo club

West Wycombe Park Polo Club was an HPA-affiliated polo club, playing on beautiful grounds set within the West Wycombe Park Estate in Buckinghamshire, England.

Founded in 1992, WWPPC operated amateur and professional tournaments and evening chukkas across its three polo grounds with matches played at weekends between May and September. The club closed in 2018.

Every year a team from West Wycombe played for the Quatro Amigos Trophy at Ham Polo Club.

== President ==
- Sir Edward Dashwood Bt.

== Chairmen ==
- Simon Holland: 1995 to 2002
- Charles Betz: 2002 to 2007
- Simon de Jongh: 2007 to 2012
- Jason Ollivier: 2012 to 2013
- Robert Gourlay: 2013 to 2018

== Polo Managers ==
- Tobias Pejkovic: 2006
- Jairo Rojas: 2007
- Richard Seavill: 2008 to 2010
- Charley Cudworth: 2011 to 2012
- Becky Bazzard: 2013 to 2015
- Gaston Devrient: 2016 to 2018

== Trophies ==
- Welcome Cup
- Friends Cup
- Spring Shield
- Hell Fire Trophy
- Amateur Challenge Cup
- Chairman's Cup
- Ladies & Gentlemen
- Quatro Amigos
- Sponsors Cup
- Countryside Cup
- Lakeside Cup
- Farewell Cup
- The Indian Summer Trophy
