= Hellfire Club =

Exclusive clubs for society rakes

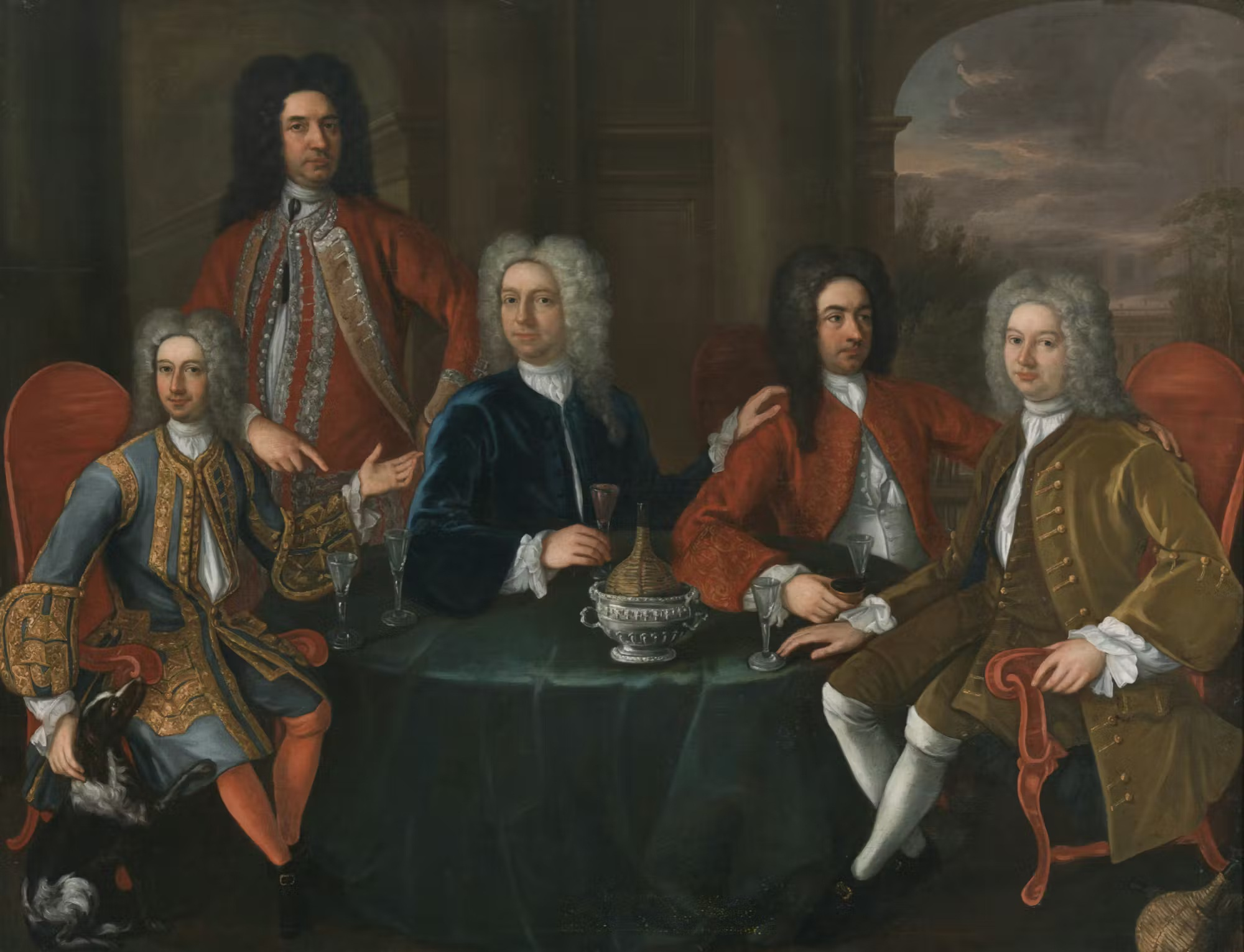
c. 1735 painting of the Dublin Hellfire Club's members

Hellfire Club was a term used to describe several exclusive clubs for high-society rakes established in Great Britain and Ireland in the 18th century. The name most commonly refers to Francis Dashwood's Order of the Friars of St Francis of Wycombe. Such clubs were rumoured to have served as the meeting places of "persons of quality" who wished to take part in socially taboo activities, and the members were often involved in politics. Neither the activities nor membership of the clubs are easy to ascertain. The clubs allegedly had distant ties to an elite society known only as "The Order of the Second Circle".

The first official Hellfire Club was founded in London in 1718, by Philip Wharton, 1st Duke of Wharton, and a handful of other high-society friends. The most notorious club associated with the name was established in England by Francis Dashwood, and met irregularly from around 1749 to around 1760, and possibly up until 1766. The term was closely associated with Brooks's, established in 1764. Other groups described as Hellfire Clubs were set up throughout the 18th century. Most of these arose in Ireland after Wharton's had been dissolved.

== Duke of Wharton's club ==
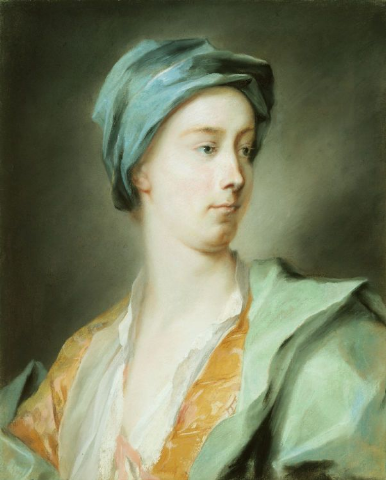
Philip, Duke of Wharton

Lord Wharton was made a duke by George I and was a prominent politician with two separate lives: the first as a "man of letters" and the second as "a drunkard, a rioter, an infidel and a rake". The members of Wharton's club are largely unknown. Mark Blackett-Ord assumes that members included Wharton's immediate friends: the Earl of Hillsborough, cousin; the Earl of Lichfield; and Sir Edward O'Brien. Aside from these names, other members are not revealed.

At the time of the London gentlemen's club, when there was a meeting place for every interest, including poetry, philosophy and politics, Wharton's Hellfire Club was, according to Blackett-Ord, a satirical "gentleman's club" which was known to ridicule religion, catching onto the contemporary trend in England of blasphemy. The club was more a joke, meant to shock the outside world, than a serious attack on religion or morality. The supposed president of this club was the Devil, although the members themselves did not apparently worship demons or the Devil, but called themselves devils. Wharton's club admitted men and women as equals, unlike other clubs of the time. The club met on Sundays at a number of different locations around London. The Greyhound Tavern was one of the meeting places used regularly, but because women were not to be seen in taverns, the meetings were also held at members' houses and at Wharton's riding club.

According to at least one source, their activities included mock religious ceremonies and partaking of meals featuring such dishes as "Holy Ghost Pie", "Breast of Venus", and "Devil's Loin", while drinking "Hell Fire Punch". Members of the club supposedly came to meetings dressed as characters from the Bible.

Wharton's club came to an end in 1721 when George I, under the influence of Wharton's political enemies (in particular, Robert Walpole) put forward a Bill "against 'horrid impieties'" (or immorality), aimed at the Hellfire Club. Wharton's political opposition used his membership as a way to pit him against his political allies, thus removing him from Parliament. After his Club was disbanded, Wharton became a Freemason, and in 1722 he became the Grand Master of England.

== Sir Francis Dashwood's clubs ==
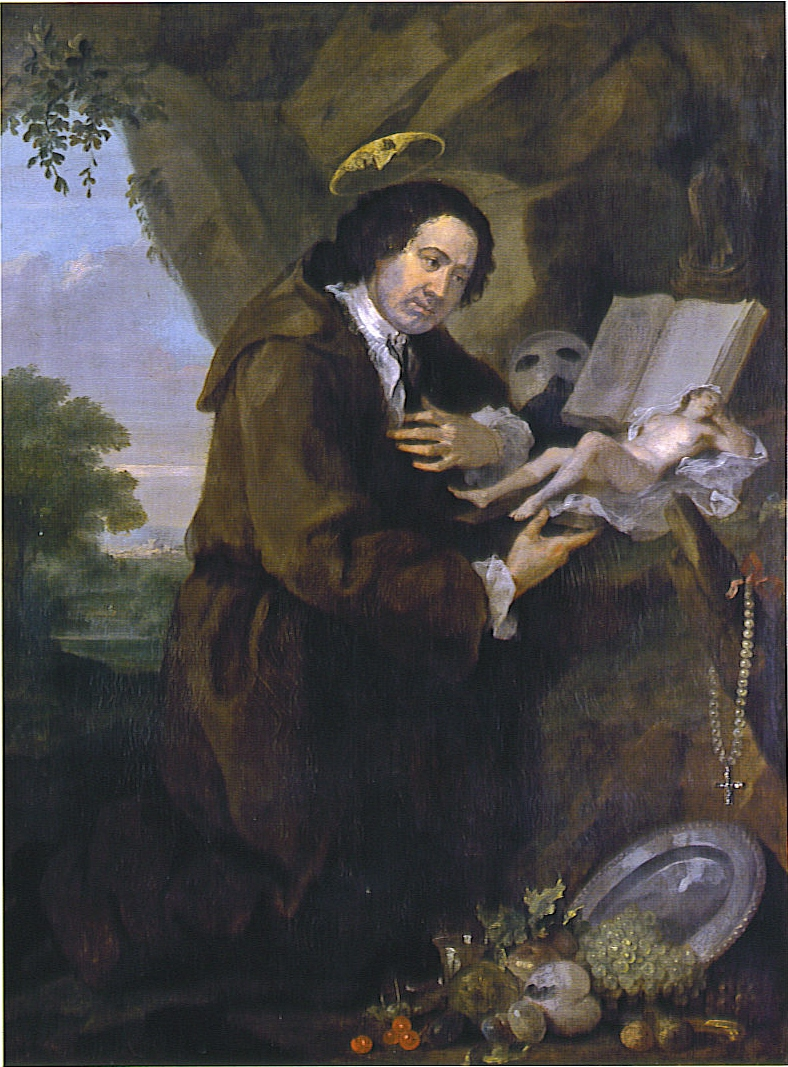
Portrait of Sir Francis Dashwood by William Hogarth

Sir Francis Dashwood and the Earl of Sandwich are alleged to have been members of a Hellfire Club that met at the George and Vulture Inn throughout the 1730s. Dashwood founded the Order of the Knights of St Francis in 1746, originally meeting at the George & Vulture.

The club motto was Fais ce que tu voudras (Do what thou wilt), a philosophy of life associated with François Rabelais's fictional abbey at Thélème and later used by Aleister Crowley.

Francis Dashwood was well known for his pranks: for example, while in the imperial court in St Petersburg, he dressed up as the king of Sweden, a great enemy of Russia. The membership of Sir Francis's club was initially limited to twelve but soon increased. Of the original twelve, some are regularly identified: Dashwood, Robert Vansittart, Thomas Potter, Francis Duffield, Edward Thompson, Paul Whitehead and John Montagu, 4th Earl of Sandwich. The list of supposed members is immense; among the more probable candidates are Benjamin Bates II, George Bubb Dodington, a fabulously corpulent man in his 60s; William Hogarth, although hardly a gentleman, has been associated with the club after painting Dashwood as a Franciscan Friar and John Wilkes, though much later, under the pseudonym John of Aylesbury. As there are no records left (these having been burned in 1774), many of these members are just assumed or linked by letters sent to each other.

=== Meetings and club activities ===
Sir Francis's club was never originally known as a Hellfire Club; it was given this name much later. The club used a number of other names, such as the Brotherhood of St. Francis of Wy, Order of Knights of West Wycombe, The Order of the Friars of St Francis of Wycombe, and later, after moving their meetings to Medmenham Abbey, they became the Monks or Friars of Medmenham. The first meeting at Sir Francis's family home in West Wycombe was held on Walpurgis Night, 1752; a much larger meeting, it was something of a failure and no large-scale meetings were held there again. In 1751, Dashwood leased Medmenham Abbey on the Thames from a friend, Francis Duffield.

On moving into Medmenham Abbey, Dashwood had numerous expensive works done on the building. It was rebuilt by the architect Nicholas Revett in the style of the 18th-century Gothic revival. At this time, the motto Fais ce que tu voudras was placed above a doorway in stained glass. It is thought that William Hogarth may have executed murals for this building; none, however, survive. Eventually, the meetings were moved out of the abbey into a series of tunnels and caves in West Wycombe Hill. They were decorated again with mythological themes, phallic symbols and other items of a sexual nature.

Records indicate that the members performed "obscene parodies of religious rites" according to one source. According to Horace Walpole, the members' "practice was rigorously pagan: Bacchus and Venus were the deities to whom they almost publicly sacrificed; and the nymphs and the hogsheads that were laid in against the festivals of this new church, sufficiently informed the neighbourhood of the complexion of those hermits." Dashwood's garden at West Wycombe contained numerous statues and shrines to different gods; Daphne and Flora, Priapus and the previously mentioned Venus and Dionysus.

A parish history from 1925 stated that members included "Frederick, Prince of Wales, the Duke of Queensberry, the Earl of Bute, Lord Melcombe, Sir William Stanhope, K.B, Sir John Dashwood-King, bart., Sir Francis Delaval, K.B., Sir John Vanluttan, kt., Henry Vansittart, afterwards Governor of Bengal, (fn. 13) and Paul Whitehead the poet". Meetings occurred twice a month, with an AGM lasting a week or more in June or September. The members addressed each other as "Brothers" and the leader, which changed regularly, as "Abbot". During meetings members supposedly wore ritual clothing: white trousers, jacket and cap, while the "Abbot" wore a red ensemble of the same style. Legends of Black Masses and Satan or demon worship have subsequently become attached to the club, beginning in the late 19th century. Rumours saw female "guests" (a euphemism for prostitutes) referred to as "nuns". Dashwood's Club meetings often included mock rituals, items of a pornographic nature, much drinking, wenching and banqueting.

=== Decline of Dashwood's Club ===
The downfall of Dashwood's Club was more drawn-out and complicated. In 1762, the Earl of Bute appointed Dashwood his Chancellor of the Exchequer, despite Dashwood being widely held to be incapable of understanding "a bar bill of five figures". (Dashwood resigned the post the next year, having raised a tax on cider which caused near-riots). Dashwood now sat in the House of Lords after taking up the title of Baron Le Despencer after the previous holder died. Then there was the attempted arrest of John Wilkes for seditious libel against the King in the notorious issue No. 45 of his The North Briton in early 1763. During a search authorised by a General warrant (possibly set up by Sandwich, who wanted to get rid of Wilkes), a version of The Essay on Woman was discovered set up on the press of a printer whom Wilkes had almost certainly used. The work was almost certainly principally written by Thomas Potter, and from internal evidence can be dated to around 1755. It was scurrilous, blasphemous, libellous, and bawdy, though not pornographic – still unquestionably illegal under the laws of the time, and the Government subsequently used it to drive Wilkes into exile. Between 1760 and 1765 Chrysal, or the Adventures of a Guinea by the Irish author Charles Johnstone was published. It contained stories easily identified with Medmenham, one in which Lord Sandwich was ridiculed as having mistaken a monkey for the Devil. This book sparked the association between the Medmenham Monks and the Hellfire Club. By this time, many of the Friars were either dead or too far away for the club to continue as it did before. Medmenham was finished by 1766.

Paul Whitehead had been the Secretary and Steward of the Order at Medmenham. When he died in 1774, as his will specified, his heart was placed in an urn at West Wycombe. It was sometimes taken out to show to visitors, but was stolen in 1829.

The West Wycombe Caves in which the Friars met are now a tourist site known as the "Hellfire Caves".

In Anstruther, Scotland, a likeminded sex and drinking club called The Beggar's Benison was formed in the 1730s, which survived for a century and spawned additional branches in Glasgow and Edinburgh. Honorary membership was extended to the Prince of Wales in 1783. Thirty-nine years later, while the Prince (by now King George IV) was paying a royal visit to Scotland, he gifted the club a snuff box filled with his mistresses' pubic hair.

== Hellfire Clubs in contemporary life ==
=== Phoenix Society ===
In 1781, Dashwood's nephew Joseph Alderson (an undergraduate at Brasenose College, Oxford) founded the Phoenix Society (later known as the Phoenix Common Room), but it was only in 1786 that the small gathering of friends asserted themselves as a recognised institution. The Phoenix was established in honour of Sir Francis, who died in 1781, as a symbolic rising from the ashes of Dashwood's earlier institution. To this day, the dining society abides by many of its predecessor's tenets. Its motto uno avulso non deficit alter 'when one is torn away another succeeds' is from the sixth book of Virgil's Aeneid and refers to the practice of establishing the continuity of the society through a process of constant renewal of its graduate and undergraduate members, but also refers to the alchemical kabbalistic process that a life snatched via sacrifice is a life given back via a spirit at the command of its master. The Phoenix Common Room's continuous history was reported in 1954 as a matter of note to the college.

== See also ==
- The Beggar's Benison
- Hellfire Caves, the still-existing underground network of caves and tunnels in the chalk hills above West Wycombe, in which meetings of Dashwood's club took place
- Montpelier Hill, 18th century meeting place of the Irish Hell Fire Club
- Secret society
