= Nicholas Sperlyng =

English politician

Nicholas Sperlyng (fl. 1388–1402), of Wycombe, Buckinghamshire, was an English politician.

He was a Member (MP) of the Parliament of England for Wycombe in 1402. He was Mayor of Wycombe in 1388–1390 and 1397–98.

Parliament of England
Preceded by John Cotyngham; William Clerk	Member of Parliament for Wycombe; 1402; With: John Sandwell	Succeeded by Henry Sperling; Rogert More
