= 1868 Wycombe by-election =

British parliamentary by-election

The 1868 Wycombe by-election, was a parliamentary by-election held for the UK House of Commons constituency of Wycombe in Buckinghamshire on 11 April 1868.

== Vacancy ==
The by-election was caused by the elevation to the peerage of the sitting Liberal MP, the Hon. Charles Carington, on the death of his father.

== Candidates ==
The outgoing MP's brother, the Hon. William Carington, was selected by the local Liberals to fight the seat. No other candidates were nominated.

== Result ==
With no other candidates putting themselves forward, Carington was returned unopposed.

Wycombe by-election, 1868
Party	Candidate	Votes	%	±%
Liberal	William Carington	Unopposed	N/A	N/A
Liberal hold				

== See also ==
- List of United Kingdom by-elections
- United Kingdom by-election records
- 1978 Wycombe by-election
