= Cecil Chadwick =

British Army officer (1901–1970)

Brigadier Cecil Arthur Harrop Chadwick CBE (13 August 1901 – 3 September 1970), was a British soldier and briefly a Liberal Party politician.

== Background ==
Chadwick was the son of Major P.T. Chadwick, of Mirfield, in the West Riding of Yorkshire. He was educated at Stanmore Park, Harrow School and the Royal Military College, Sandhurst. In 1924 he married Muriel Grace David. They had one daughter. In 1943 he was appointed a CBE.

== Professional career ==
Chadwick was too young to fight in World War One. On leaving Sandhurst in 1920 he joined the army as a 2nd Lieutenant. From 1921 to 1924 he served in India. In 1927 he transferred to the Royal Corps of Signals. From 1928 to 1933 he served in Egypt. In 1931 he was promoted to Captain. From 1936 to 1937 he was at the Staff College, Camberley. In 1938 he was promoted to Major as a General Staff Officer grade 3 with IAA Division. In 1939 he was a GSO2 with IAA Division. In 1940 he was made a GSO1 with IAA Division. In 1942 he was made a temporary Brigadier with the General Staff at AA Command. In 1943 he was with Brigade Command. In 1945 he was made a Lieutenant-Colonel and a Regional Commander in Germany. In 1946 he was promoted to Colonel with the AAG War Office. In 1948 he was CSO with the British Troops in Egypt. In 1950 he was promoted to Brigadier. In 1951 he was CSO with the Eastern Command. From 1952 to 1955 he served as Aide-de-camp to the Queen.

== Political career ==
He was Liberal candidate for the Wycombe division of Buckinghamshire at the 1945 General Election. It was the neighbouring constituency to where he lived in Gerrards Cross. Although the Liberals had last won the seat in 1923, they had not fielded a candidate since 1929. He finished a poor third;

General Election 5 to 19 July 1945: Wycombe
Party	Candidate	Votes	%	±%
Labour	John Haire	20,482	45.17	
Conservative	Roger Peake	17,946	39.58	
Liberal	Cecil Chadwick	6,916	15.25	
Majority		2,536	5.59	
Turnout			72.10	
Labour gain from Conservative		Swing		

He did not stand for parliament again.
