= Richard Sandwell =

English politician

Richard Sandwell (fl. 1377–1397), of Wycombe, Buckinghamshire, was an English politician.

He was probably the son of Mayor of Wycombe, John Sandwell. His son was the MP, John Sandwell.

He was a Member (MP) of the Parliament of England for Wycombe in October 1377, January 1380, and January 1397.
