= Watford (disambiguation) =

Watford may refer to:

== Towns ==
- Watford, a town in Hertfordshire, England
  - Watford (UK Parliament constituency), a constituency serving Watford, Hertfordshire
  - Watford F.C., a football club based in Watford, Hertfordshire
  - Watford Borough Council, the local authority for the Watford non-metropolitan district
  - Watford tube station
- Watford, Northamptonshire, a village in Northamptonshire, England
  - Watford Gap, near the Northamptonshire village
- Watford, a town in Ontario, Canada. Now merged with Warwick, Ontario
- Watford City, North Dakota, United States

== People ==
- Christian Watford (born 1991), US basketball player
- Gwen Watford (1927–1994), English actress
- Jerry Watford (1930–1993), US football player
- Miyah Watford (born 1998), US and Iceland football player
- Stephen Watford (fl. 1384-1388), English politician

== See also ==
- Walford (disambiguation)
- Waterford (disambiguation)
