= William Baring =

William Baring may refer to:

- Bingham Baring, 2nd Baron Ashburton (William Bingham Baring, 1799–1864), British politician and businessman
- William S. Baring-Gould (1913–1967), English Sherlock Holmes scholar
- William Baring du Pré (1875–1946), British politician
