= 1952 Wycombe by-election =

UK parliamentary by-election

The 1952 Wycombe by-election of 4 November 1952 was held after Conservative Member of Parliament (MP) the Hon. William Astor succeeded to the peerage. The seat was retained by the Conservative candidate John Hall.

== Results ==
1952 Wycombe by-election
Party	Candidate	Votes	%	±%
Conservative	John Hall	26,750	52.04	+0.37
Labour	John Haire	24,650	47.96	−0.37
Majority		2,100	4.08	+0.74
Turnout		51,400		
Conservative hold		Swing		
