= William Astor, 3rd Viscount Astor =

English businessman and politician (1907–1966)

The Right Honourable The Viscount Astor
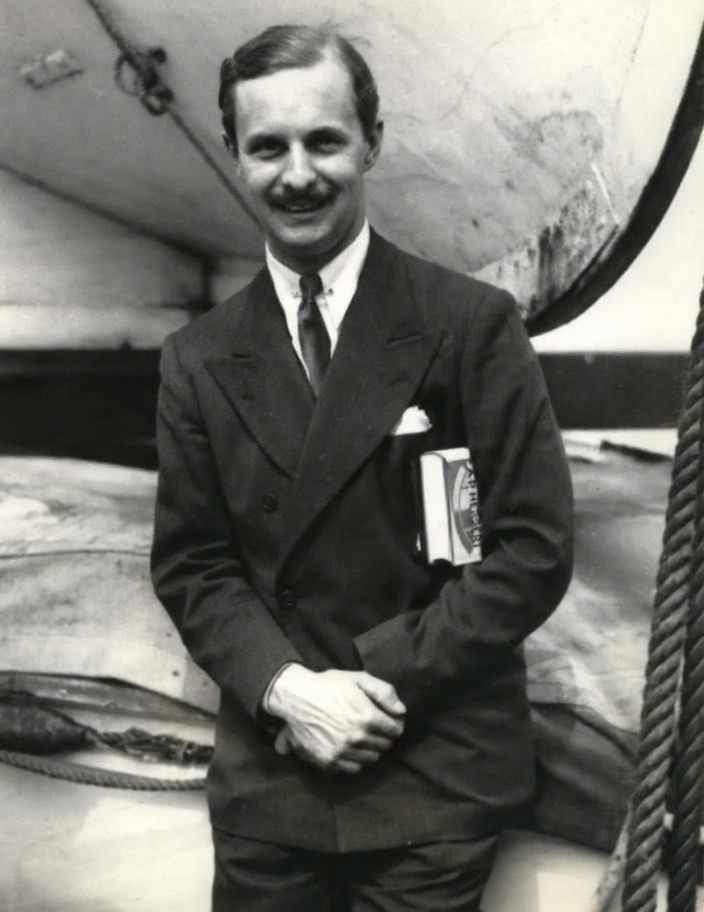
- Astor in 1934

Member of the House of Lords Lord Temporal
- In office 30 September 1952 – 7 March 1966; Hereditary Peerage
- Preceded by: The 2nd Viscount Astor
- Succeeded by: The 4th Viscount Astor

Member of Parliament for Wycombe
- In office 25 October 1951 – 30 September 1952
- Preceded by: John Haire
- Succeeded by: John Hall

Member of Parliament for Fulham East
- In office 14 November 1935 – 15 June 1945
- Preceded by: John Wilmot
- Succeeded by: Michael Stewart

Personal details
- Born: William Waldorf Astor II; 13 August 1907 Cliveden, Buckinghamshire, England
- Died: 7 March 1966 (aged 58) Nassau, Bahamas
- Spouses: Sarah Norton (m. 1945; div. 1953) Phillipa Hunloke (m. 1955; div. 1960) Bronwen Alun-Pugh (m. 1960)
- Children: 4, including William, 4th Viscount
- Parent(s): Waldorf, 2nd Viscount Astor; Nancy Langhorne
- Relatives: Astor family
- Education: Eton College; New College, Oxford
- Occupation: Businessman, politician

William Waldorf Astor II, 3rd Viscount Astor (13 August 1907 – 7 March 1966) was an English businessman and Conservative Party politician. He was also a member of the Astor family.

== Background and education ==
William was the eldest son of Waldorf Astor and Nancy Witcher Langhorne (by marriage, Viscountess Astor). He was educated at Eton and at New College, Oxford.

== Political career ==
In 1932, Astor was appointed secretary to Victor Bulwer-Lytton, 2nd Earl of Lytton, at a League of Nations Committee of Enquiry in what was then known as Manchuria. First elected to the House of Commons in 1935, he served as a Conservative Member of Parliament (MP) for Fulham East until 1945. Between 1936 and 1937 he was Parliamentary Private Secretary to the First Lord of the Admiralty, Samuel Hoare, who was then made Home Secretary in the new cabinet of Neville Chamberlain in 1937.

In World War II, he served as a naval intelligence officer, acquiring no distinction, but gaining many influential contacts. He returned as the Conservative MP for Wycombe in the 1951 general election, serving for ten months. On his father's death in 1952, he inherited his peerages, becoming the 3rd Viscount Astor and Baron Astor, with a seat in the House of Lords. This forced a by-election in Wycombe, which was won by the Conservative candidate John Hall.

Astor then took over the family's Cliveden estate in Buckinghamshire, where he and his family continued to live until 1966. Active in thoroughbred horse racing, he inherited Cliveden Stud, a horse farm and breeding operation in the village of Taplow near Maidenhead.

During the 1963 Profumo affair, Astor was accused of having an affair with Mandy Rice-Davies. In response to being told during one of the trials arising out of the scandal that Astor had denied having an affair with her, Rice-Davies famously replied, "Well he would, wouldn't he?"

== Personal life and death ==
Astor married three times:

William married Sarah Norton (20 January 1920 – 4 February 2013; daughter of Richard, 6th Baron Grantley) on 14 June 1945 and they were divorced in 1953. They had one son together:

- William Astor, 4th Viscount Astor (William Waldorf Astor III; born 27 December 1951); he married Annabel Jones on 14 January 1976.

William married Phillipa Victoria Hunloke (10 December 1930 – 20 July 2005, whose maternal grandfather was Victor Cavendish, 9th Duke of Devonshire), daughter of Henry Hunloke, on 26 April 1955 and they were divorced on 3 June 1960. They had one daughter together:

- Emily Mary Astor (born 9 June 1956)

William Astor married, finally Bronwen Alun-Pugh on 14 October 1960. They had two daughters:

- Janet Elizabeth Astor (born 1 December 1961); she married the Earl of March and Kinrara, later the 11th Duke of Richmond, on 30 November 1991.
- Pauline Marian Astor (born 26 March 1964)

Astor died in March 1966 in Nassau, Bahamas, aged 58 from a heart attack and was buried in the Octagon Temple at Cliveden. His son succeeded him in the viscountcy.

== Arms ==
Coat of arms of William Astor, 3rd Viscount Astor
Coronet A Coronet of a Viscount Crest From a Mount Vert a Falcon rising proper ensigned by three Mullets Gold Escutcheon Or, a falcon resting on a dexter hand couped at the wrist proper and gauntleted gules in chief two fleurs-de-lys of the last Supporters Dexter: a North American Indian; Sinister: a North American fur trapper; each habited accoutred and holding in the exterior hand a Rifle all proper Motto Ad Astra (To the stars)

Parliament of the United Kingdom
Preceded by John Wilmot	Member of Parliament for Fulham East; 1935–1945	Succeeded by Michael Stewart
Preceded by John Haire	Member of Parliament for Wycombe; 1951–1952	Succeeded by Sir John Hall
Peerage of the United Kingdom
Preceded by Waldorf Astor	Viscount Astor; 1952—1966	Succeeded by William Astor
