= John Remington Mills =

English politician (1798–1879)

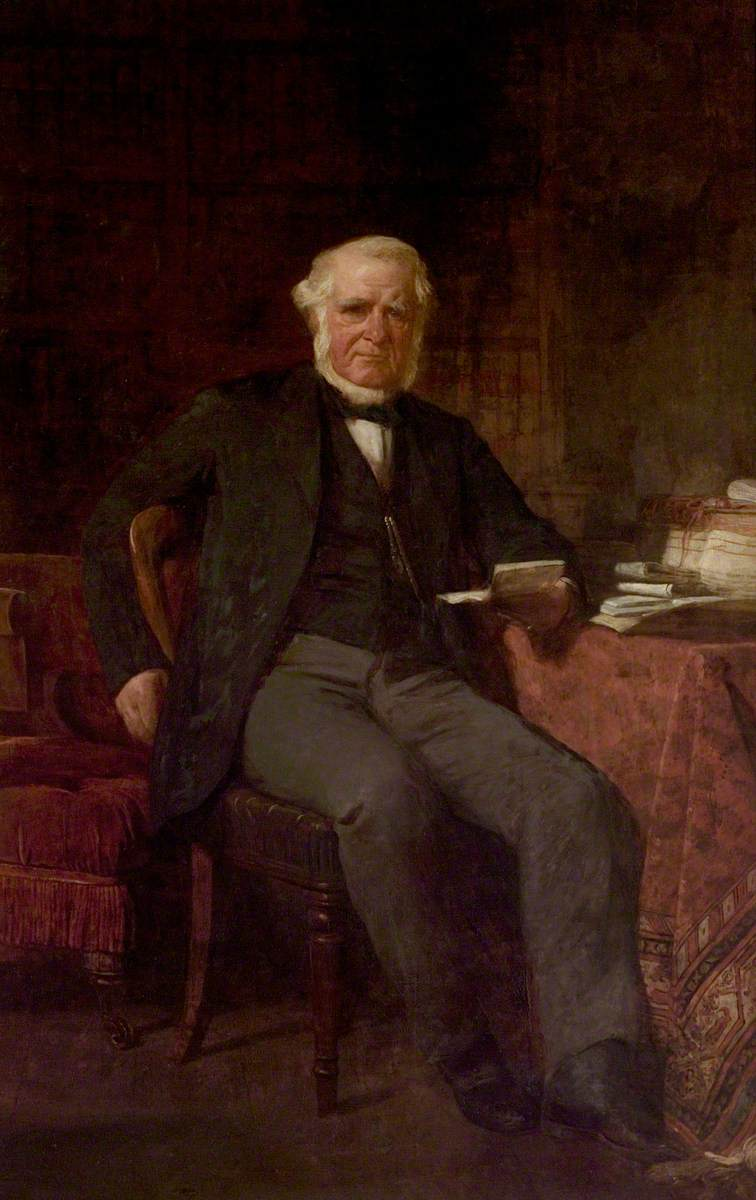
John Remington Mills, portrait exhibited 1874

John Remington Mills (1798 – 22 November 1879) was an English Liberal Party politician. He was a member of parliament (MP) for Wycombe from 1862 to 1868.

Born in London in 1798, Mills was the second son of Samuel and Mary Mills. He was the cousin of Joshua Wilson, and nephew of Thomas Wilson (1764-1843).

Mills made a vast fortune from the manufacture of silk and was amongst the wealthiest men in the country, retiring from business in 1840, at the age of 42 years old. He was otherwise described as belonging to an already-wealthy Nonconformist family engaged in the silk trade.

J.R.Mills was both radical in his political views and nonconformist in religion. He advocated the ballot, an extension of the franchise and the abolition of church rates. In foreign affairs, Mills ‘regarded the principle of non-intervention in the concerns of other States as the only true and sound one upon which this country should act.’

He was one of the largest subscribers to all the benevolent institutions of the Congregational body. He laid the foundation stone of the Congregational Memorial Hall and Library in Farringdon Street, London, in May 1872; and he donated much of the money for the erection of this building.

J.R.Mills died at his home in Tunbridge Wells, Kent, on 22 November 1879.

His relative, Elizabeth Mills, composed the popular Sunday-school hymn 'We speak of the realms of the blest' shortly before her death in 1829.

Parliament of the United Kingdom
Preceded by Martin Tucker Smith; Sir George Dashwood, Bt	Member of Parliament for Wycombe; 1862–1868; With: Martin Tucker Smith to 1865; Hon. Charles Carrington from 1865	Succeeded by Hon. William Carrington
