= Vera Woodhouse, Lady Terrington =

British politician

- Vera Terrington

Member of Parliament for Wycombe
- In office 6 December 1923 – 28 October 1924
- Prime Minister: Stanley Baldwin
- Preceded by: William Baring du Pré
- Succeeded by: Alfred Knox

Personal details
- Born: Vera Florence Annie Bousher; 11 January 1889
- Died: 19 May 1973 (aged 84)
- Party: Liberal

Vera Florence Annie Woodhouse, Lady Terrington (née Bousher; 11 January 1889 – 19 May 1973) was a British Liberal Party politician, and one of the first women Members of Parliament (MP).

== Background ==
She was born Vera Florence Annie Bousher, the second daughter of Henry George Bousher a druggist's assistant, and Anne Elizabeth Koster. She married firstly in 1907 Guy Ivo Sebright who died in 1912. In 1918 she married Harold Woodhouse, 2nd Baron Terrington, whom she divorced in 1926. Finally she married Marinus Wilhelm Lensvelt 28 March 1949.

== Political career ==
She joined the Liberal Party and took an active interest in the affairs of South Buckinghamshire. She served as Vice-President of the Buckinghamshire Lace Association. She was a Member of the Grand Council of Our Dumb Friends League. At the 1922 general election, she stood as a Liberal candidate in the Wycombe division of Buckinghamshire. Wycombe was a Unionist seat where no Liberal candidate had stood at the previous election and no Liberal had won since 1906. She managed to secure a good second place. She was one of only thirty-three women candidates standing at that election.

General election 15 November 1922: Wycombe
Party	Candidate	Votes	%	±%
Unionist	William Baring du Pré	15,627	50.1	n/a
Liberal	Vera Woodhouse, Lady Terrington	11,154	35.8	n/a
Labour	S Stennet	4,403	14.1	n/a
Majority		4,473	14.3	n/a
Turnout			69.2	n/a
Unionist hold		Swing	n/a	

She contested Wycombe again at the December 1923 general election, and was elected to the House of Commons defeating the sitting Unionist member. Her Unionist opponent was an avowed anti-feminist, and her victory was greeted with special delight among women's societies such as the Six Point Group. This made her one of only eight women in the House of Commons.

General election 6 December 1923: Wycombe
Party	Candidate	Votes	%	±%
Liberal	Vera Woodhouse, Lady Terrington	14,910	46.9	+11.1
Unionist	William Baring du Pré	13,228	41.7	−8.4
Labour	George Young	3,611	11.4	−2.7
Majority		1,682	5.2	
Turnout			68.2	
Liberal gain from Unionist		Swing	+9.8	

In Parliament, she supported the abolition of the means test for old-age pensions, making her maiden speech seconding a motion on the subject. She also actively supported the Guardianship of Infants Bill which would have given both parents equal rights to custody. She also campaigned against cruelty to animals. She lost her seat a year later, at the 1924 general election, an election in which Liberal candidates did badly across the country.

General election 29 October 1924: Wycombe
Party	Candidate	Votes	%	±%
Unionist	Sir Alfred Knox	20,820	54.8	+13.1
Liberal	Vera Woodhouse, Lady Terrington	12,526	33.0	−13.9
Labour	George Young	4,626	12.2	+0.8
Majority		8,294	21.8	
Turnout			78.0	+9.8
Unionist gain from Liberal		Swing	+13.5	

She did not stand for parliament again. She was active inside the Liberal Party at a national level, particularly with the Women's Liberal Federation moving a resolution promoting women's rights on a broad front and specifically calling for an equal franchise. In 1925 she was re-adopted by Wycombe Liberals as their candidate for the following election but withdrew due to problems in her personal life.

After 1949 she moved to South Africa. She did not enter public life in South Africa. She returned to Britain and died on 19 May 1973. She was cremated at Eastbourne on 30 May 1973. Her ashes were interred in East Hoathly Churchyard, East Sussex on 1 August 1973. At the time of her death she was living at Monks Cottage, Graywood, East Hoathly. Her age was given as 84.

== Notes ==
Parliament of the United Kingdom
Preceded by William Baring du Pré	Member of Parliament for Wycombe; 1923–1924	Succeeded by Sir Alfred Knox
