= William atte Dene =

14th-century English politician (1368–1395)

William atte Dene (fl. 1368–1395), of Wycombe, Buckinghamshire, was an English politician.

He was a Member (MP) of the Parliament of England for Wycombe in 1368, 1369, 1371, 1372, 1373, 1376, January 1377, October 1377, 1378, January 1380, October 1382, February 1383, November 1384, September 1388, January 1390, 1391, 1394 and 1395. He was Mayor of Wycombe in 1365–6 and 1370–1.
