= 1914 Wycombe by-election =

1914 UK parliamentary by-election

← 1910	18 February 1914	1918 →

Candidate	William Baring du Pré	Tonman Mosley
Party	Unionist	Liberal
Popular vote	9,044	6,713
Percentage	57.4%	42.6%
MP before election
Cripps
Conservative
Subsequent MP
William Baring du Pré
Unionist

The 1914 Wycombe by-election was a Parliamentary by-election held on 18 February 1914. The constituency returned one Member of Parliament (MP) to the House of Commons of the United Kingdom, elected by the first past the post voting system.

== Vacancy ==
Sir Charles Cripps KC was elected for Wycombe in 1910. He received a peerage from the Liberal government in 1914 and took the title Baron Parmoor of Frieth in the County of Buckingham.

== Electoral history ==
The Liberal Party had gained the seat from the Conservatives in the 1906 landslide before losing it back in January 1910. The Liberals did not contest the seat in December 1910 when the Conservative candidate was elected unopposed. In January 1910 the Conservative majority was 2,556.

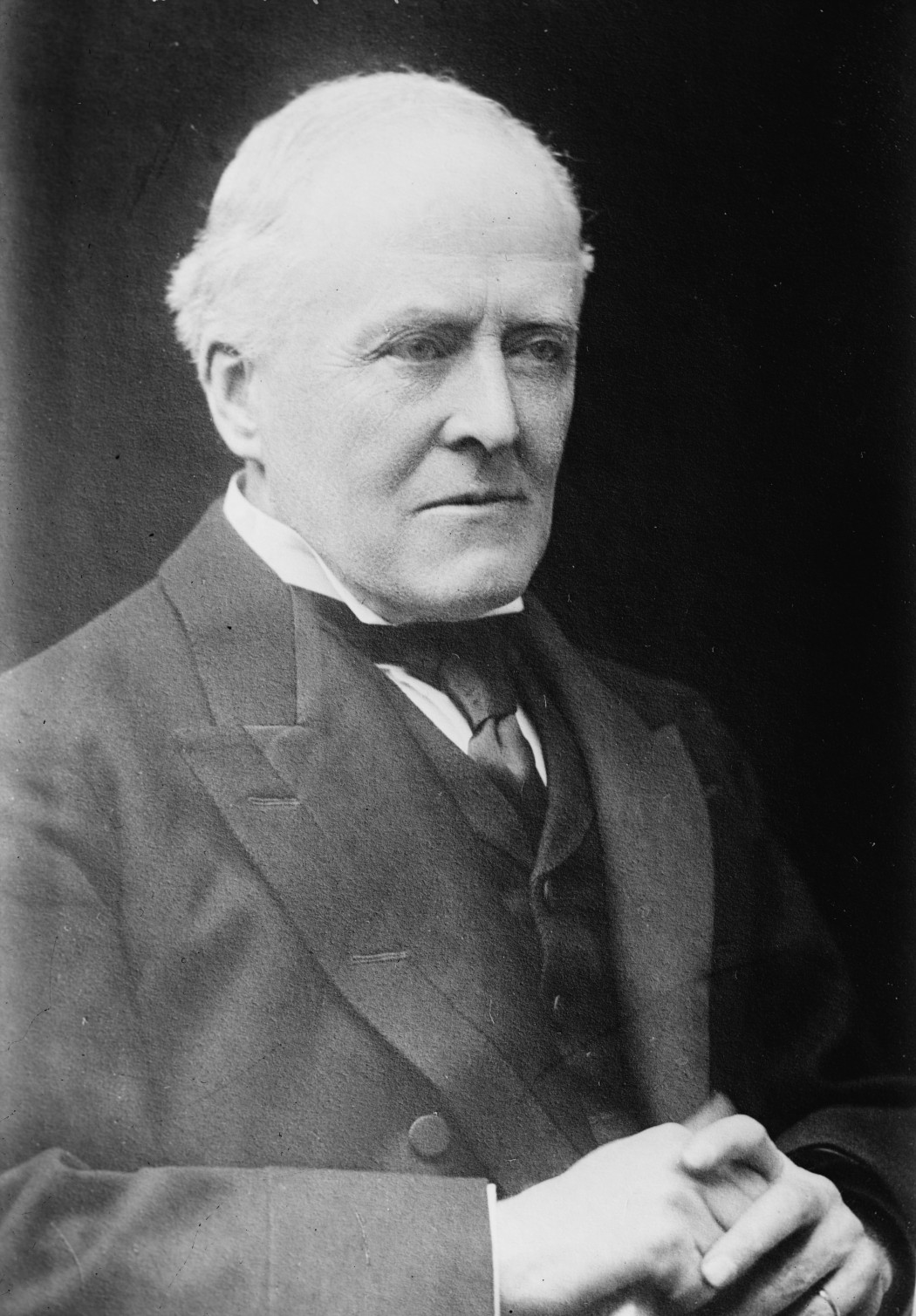
Cripps

General election January 1910
Party	Candidate	Votes	%	±%
Conservative	Charles Cripps	8,690	58.6	+13.5
Liberal	Arnold Herbert	6,134	41.4	−13.5
Majority		2,556	17.2	N/A
Turnout		14,824	90.6	+7.8
Conservative gain from Liberal		Swing	+13.5	

== Candidates ==
- There was some speculation as to who the Unionist candidate would be. It was thought that Coningsby Disraeli a former MP and nephew of the former Prime Minister might be chosen. Another candidate considered was Seddon Cripps, the son of the retiring MP. However, on 10 January, the Unionists selected William Baring du Pré. He was appointed High Sheriff of Buckinghamshire and deputy lieutenant of the county in 1911 and was a justice of the peace for Buckinghamshire. He was a popular landlord from a family long-established at Beaconsfield.
- The Liberal Party already had a candidate in place. In November 1913 they had selected Claud Vere Cavendish Hobart as their prospective parliamentary candidate. However, on 12 January he withdrew as candidate because, as an outsider to the area, he felt he had not got to know the constituency well enough. The local Liberals did have a willing candidate from within their membership in Tonman Mosley who had bought the country house of Bangors Park, Iver, in the constituency. He had been a Unionist until he resigned and joined the Liberals in 1913. He was the Chairman of South Buckinghamshire Liberal Association. He was a barrister and businessman from a landed background. He had been Chairman of the Buckinghamshire County Council since 1904. He unsuccessfully contested Lichfield Division of Staffordshire as a Conservative in the 1885 general election.
- There was speculation about a Labour Party candidate standing, due to problems with the local chairmaking industry, but the speculation came to nothing.

== Campaign ==
Polling Day was set for 18 February 1914. Given that the out-going MP had been awarded a barony on 16 January, this left only about 4 weeks for campaigning.

The new Great Western and Central railway line to Marylebone Station, opened in 1906, had brought a flood of commuters into the seat around Gerards Cross and Beaconsfield. The rise of 1,800 in the electorate in 1910-14 was largely attributable to this phenomenon, and most of these new voters were reckoned to be Unionists.

The core of the Liberal vote was the working class of High Wycombe, mainly engaged in chairmaking. Since November 1913, the whole town had been riven by a lock-out in the chairmaking industry. By February 1914 some 2 to 3,000 men were idle and there had been a number of riots in which factories and the metropolitan police had been stoned. The chairmakers were estimated to be 75-80% Liberal and the dispute deprived the Liberals of the help of some of their keenest supporters. The strike leader, Cllr Forward, advised his followers to abstain. Efforts at mediation could not solve the dispute before polling day.

The Liberal government's National Insurance Act was still thought to be unpopular with many voters.

The Liberal campaign was run by the Marquess of Lincolnshire who, as Earl Carrington, had been President of the Board of Agriculture from 1905 to 1911. He had started his own career in politics by becoming Liberal MP for Wycombe in 1865 and had maintained strong ties with the area. He was a leading advocate in the Liberal party of the Rural Land Campaign which sought to reform land ownership, land taxation, abolish plural voting and improve agricultural wages. Lincolnshire launched the local Liberal land campaign at a meeting on 2 February. There was an intensive Liberal campaign in the rural villages. A specially imported staff of lecturers was reported to be 'scouring the countryside' pressing the land policy.

== Result ==
The local press reported 'light' voting in Wycombe, while the Unionists were able to poll successfully the commuters at the eastern end of the seat. An increased Unionist majority of over 3,000 was confidently predicted. Yet, instead of a humiliating reverse, the Liberals achieved a small pro-government swing of 1.2% from the January 1910 result;

1914 Wycombe by-election
Party	Candidate	Votes	%	±%
Unionist	William Baring du Pré	9,044	57.4	−1.2
Liberal	Tonman Mosley	6,713	42.6	+1.2
Majority		2,331	14.8	−2.4
Turnout		15,757	86.3	N/A
Unionist hold		Swing	-1.2	

The relative success of the Liberal campaign was attributed to the rural land campaign.

== Aftermath ==
The Wycombe result was a boost to Liberal moral and helped convince the party of the importance in placing the Rural Land Campaign at the centre of their platform at a General Election expected to take place later in the year. It demonstrated that the campaign could save the 30 English rural seats won by the party in December 1910 and assuming the 1.2% swing could be repeated, would see the Liberals gain 9 rural seats. If the election were to be delayed long enough to allow for the passage of the Plural Voting Bill, a further 8 English rural seats would be gained by the Liberals.

Due to the outbreak of war, the election never took place and when it finally did, much had changed.

General election 14 December 1918
Party	Candidate	Votes	%	±%
Unionist	William Baring du Pré	Unopposed	N/A	N/A
Unionist hold				
