= Wycombe (constituency) =

Parliamentary constituency in the United Kingdom, 1885 onwards

Coordinates: 51.6°N 0.8°W

- County constituency for the House of Commons
- Boundaries since 2024
- Boundary of Wycombe in South East England
- County: Buckinghamshire
- Electorate: 71,769 (2023)
- Major settlements: High Wycombe, Loudwater

Current constituency
- Created: 1885
- Member of Parliament: Emma Reynolds (Labour)
- Seats: One

1295–1885
- Seats: Two until 1868, then one
- Type of constituency: County constituency

Wycombe (/ˈwɪkəm/) is a constituency in Buckinghamshire represented in the House of Commons of the UK Parliament since 2024 by Labour's Emma Reynolds. It succeeded the Parliamentary Borough of Chipping Wycombe.

== Constituency profile ==
The constituency shares similar borders with Wycombe local government district, although it covers a slightly smaller area. The main town within the constituency, High Wycombe, contains many working and middle class voters and a sizeable ethnic minority population that totals around one quarter of the town's population, with some census output areas of town home to over 50% ethnic minorities, and a number of wards harbouring a considerable Labour vote. The surrounding villages, which account for just under half of the electorate, are some of the most wealthy areas in the country, with extremely low unemployment, high incomes and favour the Conservatives. Workless claimants totalled 3.0% of the population in November 2012, lower than the national average of 3.8%.

== History ==
The Parliamentary Borough of Chipping Wycombe had continuously returned two MPs to the House of Commons of England since the Model Parliament of 1295 until 1707, then to the House of Commons of Great Britain from 1707 to 1800 and finally to the House of Commons of the United Kingdom from 1801. This was reduced to one MP by the Representation of the People Act 1867 and the Borough was abolished altogether by the Redistribution of Seats Act 1885. It was transformed into a large county division, formally named the Southern or Wycombe Division of Buckinghamshire. It was one of three divisions formed from the undivided three-member Parliamentary County of Buckinghamshire, the other two being the Mid or Aylesbury Division and the Northern or Buckingham Division. As well as the abolished Borough, it absorbed the abolished Parliamentary Borough of Great Marlow and included the towns of Beaconsfield and Slough.

Since 1885, the seat has generally been held by the Conservative Party except for brief intervals for the Liberals (1906–1910 and 1923–1924) and Labour (1945–1951) and since 2024.

The seat bucked the trend in 2019 with a swing of 2.3% to the Labour Party in spite of their heavy general election defeat, and was looked on as a key blue wall marginal constituency in the 2024 general election, with Labour winning for the first time since 1951.

== Boundaries and boundary changes ==
1885–1918

- The Municipal Borough of Chepping Wycombe;
- The Sessional Divisions of Burnham and Stoke; and
- Parts of the first and second Sessional Divisions of Desborough.

1918–1945

- The Municipal Borough of Chepping Wycombe;
- The Urban Districts of Eton, Marlow, and Slough;
- The Rural Districts of Eton and Hambleden; and
- Part of the Rural District of Wycombe.

Beaconsfield was transferred to Aylesbury. Gained Eton which had been part of the abolished Parliamentary Borough of New Windsor in Berkshire.

1945–1950

The House of Commons (Redistribution of Seats) Act 1944 set up Boundaries Commissions to carry out periodic reviews of the distribution of parliamentary constituencies. It also authorised an initial review to subdivide abnormally large constituencies in time for the 1945 election. This was implemented by the Redistribution of Seats Order 1945 under which Buckinghamshire was allocated an additional seat. As a consequence, the new constituency of Eton and Slough was formed from the Wycombe constituency, comprising the Municipal Borough of Slough and the Urban and Rural Districts of Eton. In compensation, the parts of the (revised) Rural District of Wycombe in the Aylesbury Division, including Hughenden and Princes Risborough, were transferred to Wycombe.

The revised composition of the constituency, after taking account of changes to local authorities, was:

- The Municipal Borough of Chepping Wycombe;
- The Urban District of Marlow; and
- The Rural District of Wycombe.

1950–1974

- The Municipal Borough of High Wycombe;
- The Urban District of Marlow; and
- The Rural District of Wycombe.

No changes to boundaries.

1974–1983

- The Municipal Borough of High Wycombe;
- The Urban District of Marlow; and
- The Rural District of Wycombe parishes of Chepping Wycombe, Fawley, Fingest and Lane End, Great Marlow, Hambleden, Hughenden, Little Marlow, Medmenham, Turville, and West Wycombe Rural.

Northern parts of the Rural District of Wycombe, including Princes Risborough, but excluding Hughenden, were transferred back to Aylesbury. Wooburn was included in the new constituency of Beaconsfield.

1983–1997

- The District of Wycombe wards of Booker and Castlefield, Bowerdean and Daws Hill, Cressex and Frogmoor, Downley, Great Marlow, Green Hill and Totteridge, Hambleden Valley, Hughenden Valley, Keep Hill and Hicks Farm, Kingshill, Lane End and Piddington, Little Marlow, Marlow Bottom, Marlow North, Marlow South, Marsh and Micklefield, Oakridge and Tinkers Wood, and West Wycombe and Sands.

Areas to the east of High Wycombe (former parish of Chepping Wycombe) transferred to Beaconsfield. Hazlemere transferred to Chesham and Amersham.

1997–2010

- The District of Wycombe wards of Booker and Castlefield, Bowerdean and Daws Hill, Cressex and Frogmoor, Downley, Great Marlow, Green Hill and Totteridge, Hambleden Valley, Hughenden Valley, Keep Hill and Hicks Farm, Kingshill, Lane End and Piddington, Marlow Bottom, Marlow North, Marlow South, Marsh and Micklefield, Oakridge and Tinkers Wood, and West Wycombe and Sands.

Minor changes.

Map of 2010–2024 boundaries

2010–2024

- The District of Wycombe wards of Abbey, Booker and Cressex, Bowerdean, Chiltern Rise, Disraeli, Downley and Plomer Hill, Greater Marlow, Hambleden Valley, Hazlemere North, Hazlemere South, Micklefield, Oakridge and Castlefield, Ryemead, Sands, Terriers and Amersham Hill, Totteridge, and Tylers Green and Loudwater.

Hazlemere transferred back from Chesham and Amersham. Marlow transferred to Beaconsfield and Hughenden to Aylesbury.

In April 2020, the District of Wycombe, together with those of Aylesbury, Chiltern and South Bucks were merged into the new unitary authority of Buckinghamshire Council. Accordingly, the contents of the constituency at that time were:

- The Buckinghamshire Council wards of Abbey, Booker, Cressex & Castlefield, Chiltern Villages, Downley, Hazlemere, Ryemead & Micklefield, Terriers & Amersham Hill, Totteridge & Bowerdean, Tylers Green & Loudwater, and West Wycombe (part).

2024–present

Further to the 2023 Periodic Review of Westminster constituencies which came into effect for the 2024 United Kingdom general election, the constituency is composed of the following:

- The District of Buckinghamshire wards of: Abbey; Booker & Cressex; Castlefield & Oakridge; Chiltern Villages (part); Disraeli; Downley; Hazlemere; Penn, Tylers Green & Loudwater (part); Marlow (part); Marsh & Micklefield; Ridgeway West (part); Sands; Terriers and Amersham Hill; Totteridge and Bowerdean; West Wycombe & Lane End.

The electorate was reduced to bring it within the permitted range by transferring Hazlemere back to Chesham and Amersham once again.

== Members of Parliament ==
=== MPs 1295–1640 ===
- Constituency created (1295)

Year	First member	Second member
1295	Stephen Ayott	Thomas le Tayleur
1298	Adam de Guldeford	Roger Allitarius
1300	John le Pistor	Roger Allitarius
1306	Peter le Cotiler	John le Bake
1307	Peter le Cotiler	Andrew Batyn
1307	Peter le Cotiler	Roger de Sandwell
1308	Peter le Cotiler	Edmond de Haveringdoun
1312	Thomas Gerveys	Matthew le Fuller
1312	Robert Paer	William le Cassiere
1318	Robert Smith	William le Fote
1322	Richard le Haslere	Bennet le Cassiere
1325	John le Tayleur	John de Sandwell
1326	Roger Sandwell	Matthew le Fuller
1327	Richard atte Walle	John atte Donne
1328	John atte Donne	Henry de Mussenden
1330	John le Harriere	Richard Perre
1332	Matthew le Fuller	Richard Tottering
1333	Jordan de Wycombe	Richard Bennet
1335	John Ayot	Richard Perkyn
1336	John le Harriere	Thomas Gerveys
1336	John Ayot	Richard Abyndon
1337	John le Clerk	John Pool
1338	Stephen Ayot	John le Taverner
1338	Thomas Gerveys	Jordan de Preston
1341	Robert Stenstoole	Robert Harleyford
1346	Ralph Barber	Robert Harleyford
1347	John Martyn	Robert Cattingham
1348	Walter atte Leech	William Cassiere
1355	Thomas Gerveys	Ralph Harleyford
1357	Thomas Gerveys	Robert Harleyford
1357	Thomas Gerveys	John Mepertshale
1360	Thomas Gerveys	Robert le Weeler
1360	Thomas Gerveys	Richard Spigurnell
1362	Thomas Gerveys	William Frere
1365	Thomas Cornwaile	Richard Barbour
1368	Thomas Cornwaile	William atte Dene
1369	Thomas Gerveys	William atte Dene
1371	No other?	William atte Dene
1372	John Bledlowe	William atte Dene
1373	Thomas Ballard	William atte Dene
1377	Richard Sandwell	William atte Dene
1378	Richard Jordaine	William atte Dene
1379	Richard Sandwell	William atte Dene
1381	Thomas Ravell	Walter Frere
1382	William Kele	William atte Dene
1383	Stephen Watford	John Petymin
1384	William atte Dene	Richard Kele
1385	Stephen Watford	Richard Kele
1386	Walter Frere	Richard Holiman
1388	Stephen Watford	William atte Dene
1391	William Depham	William atte Dene
1392	William Depham	Walter Waltham
1394	Walter atte Dene	William Depham
1396	Richard Sandwell	Walter Waltham
1399	John Cotyngham	William Clerk
1401	Nicholas Sperling	John Sandwell
1406	John Cotyngham	William Marchaunt
1413	Henry Sperling	Roger More
1414	William Hall	John Coventre II
1415	William Clerk	Andrew Sperling
1417	Roger More	Andrew Sperling
1419	William Merchant	John Cotyngham
1420	Roger More	Thomas Merston
1421	John Horewode	Thomas Pusey
1421	Roger More	Richard Merston
1422	Nicholas Stepton	John Coventry
1423	Roger More	John Coventry
1424	William Whaplode	John Cotyngham
1425	Thomas Muston	William Stocton
1427	John Coventry	John Justice
1429	John Wellesbourn	John Bishop
1430	Roger More	William Fowler
1432	John Martyn	John Blackpoll
1434	John Durein	John Cotyngham
1436	John Hill	Bartholomew Halling
1441	John Radeshill	John Martyn
1446	John Wellesbourn	John Martyn
1448	John Wellesbourn	John Haynes
1449	William Stocton	Nicholas Fayrewell
1450	William Stocton	Thomas More
1452	William Collard	David Thomasyn
1461	Thomas Mansell	Thomas Catsbury
1469	Thomas Fowler	Thomas Fayrewell
1478	Thomas Gate	Thomas Wellesbourn
1529	William Windsor	
1542	John Gates	William Dormer
1547	Thomas Fisher	Armigyll Wade
Mar 1553	Henry Peckham	John Cheyne
Oct 1553	Henry Peckham	Robert Drury
Apr 1554	Henry Peckham	Thomas Pymme alias Fryer
Nov 1554	John Cheyne	William Drury
1555	Henry Peckham	Robert Drury
1558	Thomas Pymme	Robert Woodleafe
1558	Paul Wentworth	Roland Bracebridge
1562	Thomas Fermore alias Draper	Thomas Keele
1570	John Russell	Robert Christmas
1571	Thomas Nale	Rowland Goules
1584	John Morley	George Cawfield
1585	Thomas Ridley	George Fleetwood
1589	Owen Oglethorp	Francis Goodwin
1592	Thomas Tasburgh	Thomas Fortescue
1596	William Fortescue	John Tasburgh
1601	Richard Blount	Henry Fleetwood
1604	Sir John Townsend	Henry Fleetwood
1614	William Borlase	Sir Henry Neville
1621	Richard Lovelace	Arthur Goodwin
1624	Henry Coke	Arthur Goodwin
1625	Henry Coke	Thomas Lane
1626	Henry Coke	Edmund Waller
1628	Sir William Borlase	Thomas Lane
1629–1640	No Parliament summoned	

=== MPs 1640–1868 ===
Year	First member	First party	Second member	Second party
April 1640	Sir Edmund Verney	Royalist	Thomas Lane	Parliamentarian
November 1640	Sir Edmund Verney	Royalist	Thomas Lane	Parliamentarian
October 1642	Verney killed in battle – seat left vacant		Thomas Lane	Parliamentarian
1645	Richard Browne		Thomas Lane	Parliamentarian
December 1648	Browne and Lane excluded in Pride's Purge – seats vacant			
1653	Wycombe was unrepresented in the Barebones Parliament			
1654	Thomas Scot		Wycombe had only one seat in the First and Second Parliaments of the Protectorate	
1656	Tobias Bridge		Wycombe had only one seat in the First and Second Parliaments of the Protectorate	
January 1659	Tobias Bridge		Thomas Scot	
May 1659	Not represented in the restored Rump			
April 1660	Edmund Petty		Richard Browne	
1661	Sir Edmund Pye		Sir John Borlase	
February 1673	Sir Edmund Pye		Sir John Borlase	
November 1673	Robert Sawyer		Sir John Borlase	
1679	Thomas Lewes		Sir John Borlase	
1685	Sir Dennis Hampson		Edward Baldwin	
1689	Thomas Lewes		William Jephson	
1691	Thomas Lewes		Charles Godfrey	
1696	Fleetwood Dormer		Charles Godfrey	
1698	John Archdale		Charles Godfrey	
1699	Thomas Archdale		Charles Godfrey	
1701	Fleetwood Dormer		Charles Godfrey	
1710	Sir Thomas Lee		Charles Godfrey	
1713	Sir Thomas Lee		Sir John Wittewrong	
February 1722	Sir Thomas Lee		John Neale	
March 1722	Charles Egerton		The Earl of Shelburne	
February 1726	Charles Colyear		The Earl of Shelburne	
March 1726	Harry Waller		The Earl of Shelburne	
1727	Harry Waller		William Lee	
1730	Harry Waller		Sir Charles Vernon	
1734	Harry Waller		Edmund Waller	
1734	Harry Waller		Sir Charles Vernon	
1741	Harry Waller		Edmund Waller	
1747	Edmund Waller Junior		Edmund Waller	
1754	The Earl of Shelburne		John Waller	Opposition Whig
1757	The Earl of Shelburne		Edmund Waller Junior	
1760	Viscount FitzMaurice	Whig	Edmund Waller Junior	
March 1761	Viscount FitzMaurice	Whig	Robert Waller	
December 1761	Isaac Barré	Whig	Robert Waller	
1774	Hon. Thomas FitzMaurice		Robert Waller	
1780	Viscount Mahon	Whig	Robert Waller	
1786	Earl Wycombe		Robert Waller	
1790	Earl Wycombe		Rear-Admiral Sir John Jervis	Whig
1794	Earl Wycombe		Sir Francis Baring	
1796	Earl Wycombe		Sir John Dashwood-King	Non Partisan
1802	Sir Francis Baring		Sir John Dashwood-King	Non Partisan
1806	Sir Thomas Baring	Whig	Sir John Dashwood-King	Non Partisan
1831	Sir Thomas Baring	Whig	Hon. Robert Smith	Whig
1832	Hon. Charles Grey	Whig	Hon. Robert Smith	Whig
1837	Sir George Dashwood	Whig	Hon. Robert Smith	Whig
1838	Sir George Dashwood	Whig	George Robert Smith	Whig
1841	Sir George Dashwood	Whig	Ralph Bernal	Radical
1847	Sir George Dashwood	Whig	Martin Tucker Smith	Whig
1859	Sir George Dashwood	Liberal	Martin Tucker Smith	Liberal
1862	John Remington Mills	Liberal	Martin Tucker Smith	Liberal
1865	John Remington Mills	Liberal	Hon. Charles Carrington	Liberal

=== MPs 1868–present ===
- Reduced to one member (1868)

Year	Member	Party
1868	Hon. William Carington	Liberal
1883 by-election	Gerard Smith	Liberal
1885	Richard Curzon	Conservative
1900	William Grenfell	Conservative
1906	Arnold Herbert	Liberal
January 1910	Sir Charles Cripps	Conservative
1914 by-election	William Baring du Pré	Conservative
1923	Vera Woodhouse	Liberal
1924	Sir Alfred Knox	Unionist
1945	John Haire	Labour
1951	William Astor	Conservative
1952 by-election	Sir John Hall	Conservative
1978 by-election	Sir Ray Whitney	Conservative
2001	Paul Goodman	Conservative
2010	Steve Baker	Conservative
2024	Emma Reynolds	Labour

== Elections ==
View source data.

=== Elections in the 2020s ===
General election 2024: Wycombe
Party	Candidate	Votes	%	±%
Labour	Emma Reynolds	16,035	35.9	▼4.0
Conservative	Steve Baker	11,444	25.6	▼17.5
Reform	Richard Phoenix	4,769	10.7	new
Liberal Democrats	Toni Brodelle	4,236	9.5	▼1.8
Workers Party	Khalil Ahmed	3,344	7.5	new
Green	Catherine Bunting	2,193	4.9	▲2.3
Independent	Ajaz Rehman	1,913	4.3	new
Climate	Ed Gemmell	489	1.1	new
Independent	Mark Smallwood	214	0.5	new
Majority		4,591	10.3	▲2.6
Turnout		44,637	60.5	▼4.8
Registered electors		73,846		
Labour gain from Conservative		Swing	▲6.8	

=== Elections in the 2010s ===
2019 notional result
Party	Vote	%
Conservative	20,213	43.1
Labour	18,719	39.9
Liberal Democrats	5,310	11.3
Others	1,441	3.1
Green	1,209	2.6
Turnout	46,892	65.3
Electorate	71,769	

General election 2019: Wycombe
Party	Candidate	Votes	%	±%
Conservative	Steve Baker	24,766	45.2	−4.8
Labour	Khalil Ahmed	20,552	37.5	−0.2
Liberal Democrats	Toni Brodelle	6,543	11.9	+4.1
Green	Peter Sims	1,454	2.7	+0.5
Wycombe Independents	Julia Wassell	926	1.7	New
UKIP	Vijay Srao	324	0.6	−1.7
Independent	Edmund Gemmell	191	0.3	New
Majority		4,214	7.7	−4.6
Turnout		54,756	70.1	+0.7
Registered electors				
Conservative hold		Swing	−2.3	

General election 2017: Wycombe
Party	Candidate	Votes	%	±%
Conservative	Steve Baker	26,766	50.0	−1.4
Labour	Rafiq Raja	20,188	37.7	+15.2
Liberal Democrats	Steve Guy	4,147	7.8	−1.0
UKIP	Richard Phoenix	1,210	2.3	−7.8
Green	Peter Sims	1,182	2.2	−3.8
Majority		6,578	12.3	−16.6
Turnout		53,493	69.4	+2.0
Registered electors				
Conservative hold		Swing	−8.3	

General election 2015: Wycombe
Party	Candidate	Votes	%	±%
Conservative	Steve Baker	26,444	51.4	+2.8
Labour	David Williams	11,588	22.5	+5.2
UKIP	David Meacock	5,198	10.1	+5.7
Liberal Democrats	Steve Guy	4,546	8.8	−20.0
Green	Jem Bailey	3,086	6.0	New
Independent	David Fitton	577	1.1	+0.7
Majority		14,856	28.9	+9.1
Turnout		51,439	67.4	+1.2
Registered electors		76,371		
Conservative hold		Swing		

General election 2010: Wycombe
Party	Candidate	Votes	%	±%
Conservative	Steve Baker	23,423	48.6	+0.4
Liberal Democrats	Steve Guy	13,863	28.8	+12.0
Labour	Andrew Lomas	8,326	17.3	−13.4
UKIP	John Wiseman	2,123	4.4	
Independent	Mudassar Khokar	228	0.5	
Independent	David Fitton	188	0.4	
Majority		9,560	19.9	+2.4
Turnout		48,151	66.2	+1.7
Registered electors		74,502		
Conservative hold		Swing	−5.8	

=== Elections in the 2000s ===
2005 notional result
Party	Vote	%
Conservative	21,374	48.2
Labour	13,625	30.7
Liberal Democrats	7,463	16.8
Others	1,885	4.3
Turnout	44,347	62.9
Electorate	70,461	

General election 2005: Wycombe
Party	Candidate	Votes	%	±%
Conservative	Paul Goodman	20,331	45.8	+3.4
Labour	Julia Wassell	13,280	29.9	−5.4
Liberal Democrats	James Oates	8,780	19.8	+2.8
UKIP	Robert Davis	1,735	3.9	+1.5
Independent	David Fitton	301	0.7	+0.2
Majority		7,051	15.9	+8.8
Turnout		44,427	62.2	+1.7
Registered electors		71,464		
Conservative hold		Swing	+4.4	

General election 2001: Wycombe
Party	Candidate	Votes	%	±%
Conservative	Paul Goodman	19,064	42.4	+2.5
Labour	Chauhdry Shafique	15,896	35.3	−0.1
Liberal Democrats	Dee Tomlin	7,658	17.0	−1.5
UKIP	Christopher Cooke	1,059	2.4	New
Green	John Laker	1,057	2.4	+1.0
Independent	David Fitton	240	0.5	New
Majority		3,168	7.1	+2.6
Turnout		44,974	60.5	−10.6
Registered electors		74,647		
Conservative hold		Swing		

=== Elections in the 1990s ===
General election 1997: Wycombe
Party	Candidate	Votes	%	±%
Conservative	Ray Whitney	20,890	39.9	−13.2
Labour	Chris Bryant	18,520	35.4	+14.0
Liberal Democrats	Paul Bensilum	9,678	18.5	−4.5
Referendum	Alan Fulford	2,394	4.6	New
Green	John Laker	716	1.4	+0.2
Natural Law	Mark Heath	121	0.2	New
Majority		2,370	4.5	−25.7
Turnout		52,319	71.1	−6.4
Registered electors		73,589		
Conservative hold		Swing	−13.6	

1992 notional result
Party	Vote	%
Conservative	30,040	53.3
Liberal Democrats	12,982	23.0
Labour	12,096	21.4
Others	1,295	2.3
Turnout	56,413	77.5
Electorate	72,794	

General election 1992: Wycombe
Party	Candidate	Votes	%	±%
Conservative	Ray Whitney	30,081	53.1	−0.7
Liberal Democrats	Tim Andrews	13,005	23.0	−4.5
Labour	John Huddart	12,222	22.6	+2.9
Green	John Laker	686	1.2	New
SDP	Alan Page	449	0.8	New
Natural Law	T. Anton	168	0.3	New
Majority		17,076	30.1	+3.8
Turnout		56,611	78.0	+5.2
Registered electors		72,564		
Conservative hold		Swing	+1.9	

=== Elections in the 1980s ===
General election 1987: Wycombe
Party	Candidate	Votes	%	±%
Conservative	Ray Whitney	28,209	53.9	−0.4
SDP	Tom Hayhoe	14,390	27.5	−0.5
Labour	John Huddart	9,773	18.7	+1.5
Majority		13,819	26.4	+0.1
Turnout		56,611	72.8	+1.2
Registered electors		71,918		
Conservative hold		Swing	+0.1	

General election 1983: Wycombe
Party	Candidate	Votes	%	±%
Conservative	Ray Whitney	27,221	54.2	−3.1
SDP	Alan Page	14,024	27.9	+13.5
Labour	Colin Bastin	8,636	17.2	−9.8
Multiracial Political Party	M. Amin	327	0.6	New
Majority		13,197	26.3	−4.0
Turnout		50,208	71.7	
Registered electors		70,065		
Conservative hold		Swing	−8.3	

=== Elections in the 1970s ===
1979 notional result
Party	Vote	%
Conservative	29,787	57.3
Labour	14,045	27.0
Liberal	7,504	14.4
Others	650	1.3
Turnout	51,986	
Electorate		

General election 1979: Wycombe
Party	Candidate	Votes	%	±%
Conservative	Ray Whitney	38,171	57.3	+11.0
Labour	Trevor Fowler	18,000	27.0	−3.8
Liberal	A. Lawson	9,615	14.4	−4.9
National Front	Sylvia Jones	833	1.3	−2.2
Majority		20,171	30.3	+14.8
Turnout		66,619	77.6	+5.3
Registered electors		85,843		
Conservative hold		Swing	+7.4	

1978 Wycombe by-election
Party	Candidate	Votes	%	±%
Conservative	Ray Whitney	29,677	60.0	+13.6
Labour	Trevor Fowler	14,109	28.5	−2.3
Liberal	Harry Warschauer	3,665	7.41	−11.9
National Front	Sylvia Jones	2,040	4.1	+0.6
Majority		15,568	31.45	+16.0
Turnout		49,491		
Registered electors				
Conservative hold		Swing		

General election October 1974: Wycombe
Party	Candidate	Votes	%	±%
Conservative	John Hall	27,131	46.3	+0.1
Labour	W. F. Back	18,052	30.8	+1.3
Liberal	M. T. James	11,333	19.4	−4.9
National Front	D. H. Smith	2,049	3.5	New
Majority		9,079	15.5	−1.3
Turnout		58,565	74.3	−7.4
Registered electors		78,832		
Conservative hold		Swing	−0.6	

General election February 1974: Wycombe
Party	Candidate	Votes	%	±%
Conservative	John Hall	29,521	46.2	−9.7
Labour	W. F. Back	18,822	29.5	−3.0
Liberal	M. T. James	15,512	24.3	+12.7
Majority		10,699	16.8	−6.7
Turnout		63,855	81.7	+5.5
Registered electors		78,203		
Conservative hold		Swing	−3.3	

1970 notional result
Party	Vote	%
Conservative	32,622	55.9
Labour	18,967	32.5
Liberal	6,741	11.6
Turnout	58,330	76.2
Electorate	76,564	

General election 1970: Wycombe
Party	Candidate	Votes	%	±%
Conservative	John Hall	40,151	55.93	
Labour	Bryan S. Jones	23,341	32.51	
Liberal	Ernest Henry Palfrey	8,297	11.56	
Majority		16,810	23.42	
Turnout		71,789	74.83	
Conservative hold		Swing		

=== Elections in the 1960s ===
General election 1966: Wycombe
Party	Candidate	Votes	%	±%
Conservative	John Hall	31,577	49.25	
Labour	Joseph Holland	24,498	38.21	
Liberal	Morris Janis	8,037	12.54	
Majority		7,079	11.04	
Turnout		64,112	77.19	
Conservative hold		Swing		

General election 1964: Wycombe
Party	Candidate	Votes	%	±%
Conservative	John Hall	30,877	50.01	
Labour	Michael Barnes	21,534	34.88	
Liberal	Arthur Donald Dennis	9,330	15.11	
Majority		9,343	15.13	
Turnout		61,741	81.34	
Conservative hold		Swing		

=== Elections in the 1950s ===
General election 1959: Wycombe
Party	Candidate	Votes	%	±%
Conservative	John Hall	30,774	53.29	
Labour	Wilfred Fordham	19,904	34.47	
Liberal	Arthur Donald Dennis	7,068	12.24	New
Majority		10,870	18.82	
Turnout		57,746	84.67	
Conservative hold		Swing		

General election 1955: Wycombe
Party	Candidate	Votes	%	±%
Conservative	John Hall	29,845	57.67	
Labour	Ray Fletcher	21,905	42.33	
Majority		7,940	15.34	
Turnout		51,750	82.02	
Conservative hold		Swing		

1952 Wycombe by-election
Party	Candidate	Votes	%	±%
Conservative	John Hall	26,750	52.04	+0.37
Labour	John Haire	24,650	47.96	−0.37
Majority		2,100	4.08	+0.74
Turnout		51,400		
Conservative hold		Swing		

General election 1951: Wycombe
Party	Candidate	Votes	%	±%
Conservative	William Astor	27,084	51.67	
Labour	John Haire	25,331	48.33	
Majority		1,753	3.34	N/A
Turnout		52,415	86.21	
Conservative gain from Labour		Swing		

General election 1950: Wycombe
Party	Candidate	Votes	%	±%
Labour	John Haire	21,491	42.09	
Conservative	William Astor	21,015	41.16	
Liberal	Brian Armstrong Law	8,354	16.36	
Communist	E. Leigh	199	0.39	New
Majority		476	0.93	
Turnout		51,059	85.83	
Labour hold		Swing		

=== Election in the 1940s ===
General election 1945: Wycombe
Party	Candidate	Votes	%	±%
Labour	John Haire	20,482	45.17	
Conservative	Roger Peake	17,946	39.58	
Liberal	Cecil Chadwick	6,916	15.25	New
Majority		2,536	5.59	N/A
Turnout		45,344	72.10	
Labour gain from Conservative		Swing		

A general election was expected 1939–40 and by 1939 the following had been adopted as candidates;

- Conservative: Alfred Knox
- Labour: Ernest Whitfield
- Liberal: Vaughan Watkins

In 1938, the local Labour and Liberal parties had set up a formal organisation, 'The South Bucks Unity Committee' in support of a Popular Front and may well have agreed to support a joint candidate against the sitting Conservative.

=== Election in the 1930s ===
General election 1935: Wycombe
Party	Candidate	Votes	%	±%
Conservative	Alfred Knox	34,747	64.87	
Labour	Ernest Whitfield	18,817	35.13	
Majority		15,930	29.74	
Turnout		53,564	61.41	
Conservative hold		Swing		

General election 1931: Wycombe
Party	Candidate	Votes	%	±%
Conservative	Alfred Knox	41,208	79.20	
Labour	Leslie Haden-Guest	10,821	20.80	
Majority		30,387	58.40	
Turnout		52,029	67.47	
Conservative hold		Swing		

=== Election in the 1920s ===
General election 1929: Wycombe
Party	Candidate	Votes	%	±%
Unionist	Alfred Knox	23,231	47.4	−7.4
Liberal	Leonard John Humphrey	16,929	34.5	+1.5
Labour	R. Townsend	8,899	18.1	+5.9
Majority		6,302	12.9	−8.9
Turnout		49,059	71.1	−6.9
Unionist hold		Swing	−4.5	

General election 1924: Wycombe
Party	Candidate	Votes	%	±%
Unionist	Alfred Knox	20,820	54.8	+13.1
Liberal	Vera Woodhouse	12,526	33.0	−11.9
Labour	George Young	4,626	12.2	+0.8
Majority		8,294	21.8	N/A
Turnout		37,972	78.0	+9.8
Unionist gain from Liberal		Swing		

General election 1923: Wycombe
Party	Candidate	Votes	%	±%
Liberal	Vera Woodhouse	14,910	46.9	+11.1
Unionist	William Baring du Pré	13,228	41.7	−8.4
Labour	George Young	3,611	11.4	−2.7
Majority		1,682	5.2	N/A
Turnout		31,749	68.2	−1.0
Liberal gain from Unionist		Swing	+9.8	

Vera Terrington

General election 1922: Wycombe
Party	Candidate	Votes	%
Unionist	William Baring du Pré	15,627	50.1
Liberal	Vera Woodhouse	11,154	35.8
Labour	Samuel Stennett	4,403	14.1
Majority		4,473	14.3
Turnout		31,184	69.2
Unionist hold			

=== Elections 1868–1918 ===
==== Elections in the 1910s ====
General election 14 December 1918: Wycombe
Party		Candidate	Votes	%	±%
C	Unionist	William Baring du Pré	Unopposed		
	Unionist hold				
C indicates candidate endorsed by the coalition government.

1914 Wycombe by-election
Party	Candidate	Votes	%
Unionist	William Baring du Pré	9,044	57.4
Liberal	Tonman Mosley	6,713	42.6
Majority		2,331	14.8
Turnout		15,757	86.3
Registered electors		18,268	
Unionist hold			

General election December 1910: Wycombe
Party	Candidate	Votes	%	±%
Conservative	Charles Cripps	Unopposed		
Conservative hold				

General election January 1910: Wycombe
Party	Candidate	Votes	%	±%
Conservative	Charles Cripps	8,690	58.6	+13.5
Liberal	Arnold Herbert	6,134	41.4	−13.5
Majority		2,556	17.2	N/A
Turnout		14,824	90.6	+7.8
Registered electors		16,366		
Conservative gain from Liberal		Swing	+13.5	

==== Elections in the 1900s ====
Herbert

General election 1906: Wycombe
Party	Candidate	Votes	%	±%
Liberal	Arnold Herbert	6,839	54.9	+17.9
Conservative	Alfred Cripps	5,626	45.1	−17.9
Majority		1,213	9.8	N/A
Turnout		12,465	82.8	+8.6
Registered electors		15,050		
Liberal gain from Conservative		Swing	+17.9	

General election 1900: Wycombe
Party	Candidate	Votes	%
Conservative	William Grenfell	6,111	63.0
Liberal	J. Thomas	3,582	37.0
Majority		2,529	26.0
Turnout		9,693	74.2
Registered electors		13,064	
Conservative hold			

==== Elections in the 1890s ====
By-election 21 February 1896: Wycombe
Party	Candidate	Votes	%	±%
Conservative	Richard Curzon	Unopposed		
Conservative hold				

- Caused by Curzon's appointment as Treasurer of the Household.

General election 1895: Wycombe
Party	Candidate	Votes	%	±%
Conservative	Richard Curzon	Unopposed		
Conservative hold				

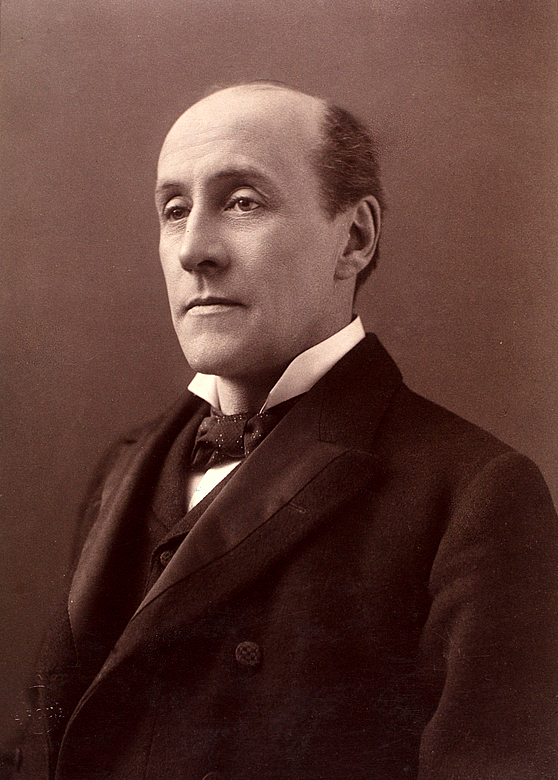
Hawkins

General election 1892: Wycombe
Party	Candidate	Votes	%	±%
Conservative	Richard Curzon	5,030	55.8	−0.8
Liberal	Anthony Hope	3,988	44.2	+0.8
Majority		1,042	11.6	−1.6
Turnout		9,018	78.1	+5.7
Registered electors		11,546		
Conservative hold		Swing	−0.8	

==== Elections in the 1880s ====
General election 1886: Wycombe
Party	Candidate	Votes	%	±%
Conservative	Richard Curzon	4,620	56.6	+2.0
Liberal	Alfred Gilbey (British soldier)	3,537	43.4	−2.0
Majority		1,083	13.2	+4.0
Turnout		9,331	72.4	−10.4
Registered electors		11,269		
Conservative hold		Swing	+2.0	

General election 1885: Wycombe
Party	Candidate	Votes	%
Conservative	Richard Curzon	5,092	54.6
Liberal	Rupert Carington	4,239	45.4
Majority		853	9.2
Turnout		9,331	82.8
Registered electors		11,269	
Conservative gain from Liberal			

By-election 12 March 1883: Wycombe
Party	Candidate	Votes	%
Liberal	Gerard Smith	1,105	66.5
Conservative	James Simpson Carson	557	33.5
Majority		548	33.0
Turnout		1,662	80.6
Registered electors		2,062	
Liberal hold			

By-election 26 May 1880: Wycombe
Party	Candidate	Votes	%	±%
Liberal	William Carington	Unopposed		
Registered electors		1,865		
Liberal hold				

- Caused by Carington's appointment as a Groom in Waiting.

General election 1880: Wycombe
Party	Candidate	Votes	%	±%
Liberal	William Carington	Unopposed		
Registered electors		1,865		
Liberal hold				

==== Elections in the 1870s ====
General election 1874: Wycombe
Party	Candidate	Votes	%	±%
Liberal	William Carrington	953	68.7	+10.3
Lib-Lab	Henry Broadhurst	415	29.9	N/A
Liberal-Conservative	Frederick Charsley	19	1.4	New
Majority		538	38.8	+22.0
Turnout		1,387	86.7	−3.1
Registered electors		1,599		
Liberal hold		Swing	N/A	

==== Elections in the 1860s ====
General election 1868: Wycombe
Party	Candidate	Votes	%
Liberal	William Carrington	701	58.4
Liberal	John Remington Mills	500	41.6
Majority		201	16.8
Turnout		1,201	89.8
Registered electors		1,338	
Liberal hold			

=== Elections 1832–1868 ===
==== Elections in the 1860s ====
By-election 11 April 1868: Wycombe
Party	Candidate	Votes	%	±%
Liberal	William Carrington	Unopposed		
Liberal hold				

- Caused by Carrington's succession to the peerage, becoming Lord Carrington.

General election 1865: Wycombe
Party	Candidate	Votes	%	±%
Liberal	Charles Carrington	Unopposed		
Liberal	John Remington Mills	Unopposed		
Registered electors		551		
Liberal hold				
Liberal hold				

By-election 18 March 1862: Wycombe
Party	Candidate	Votes	%
Liberal	John Remington Mills	220	58.2
Conservative	Donald Cameron	158	41.8
Majority		62	16.4
Turnout		378	89.4
Registered electors		423	
Liberal hold			

- Caused by Dashwood's death.

==== Elections in the 1850s ====
General election 1859: Wycombe
Party	Candidate	Votes	%	±%
Liberal	George Dashwood	Unopposed		
Liberal	Martin Tucker Smith	Unopposed		
Registered electors		392		
Liberal hold				
Liberal hold				

General election 1857: Wycombe
Party	Candidate	Votes	%	±%
Whig	George Dashwood	Unopposed		
Whig	Martin Tucker Smith	Unopposed		
Registered electors		390		
Whig hold				
Whig hold				

General election 1852: Wycombe
Party	Candidate	Votes	%
Whig	George Dashwood	262	44.7
Whig	Martin Tucker Smith	208	35.5
Whig	William Simpson	116	19.8
Majority		92	15.7
Turnout		293 (est)	84.7 (est)
Registered electors		346	
Whig hold			
Whig hold			

==== Elections in the 1840s ====
General election 1847: Wycombe
Party	Candidate	Votes	%	±%
Whig	George Dashwood	Unopposed		
Whig	Martin Tucker Smith	Unopposed		
Registered electors		335		
Whig hold				
Whig gain from Radical				

General election 1841: Wycombe
Party	Candidate	Votes	%
Whig	George Dashwood	189	33.5
Radical	Ralph Bernal	159	28.2
Conservative	James William Freshfield	130	23.0
Conservative	Robert Alexander	86	15.2
Majority		29	5.2
Turnout		288	74.2
Registered electors		388	
Whig hold			
Radical gain from Whig			

==== Elections in the 1830s ====
By-election, 23 October 1838: Wycombe
Party	Candidate	Votes	%
Whig	George Robert Smith	Unopposed	
Whig hold			

- Caused by Smith's succession to the peerage, becoming 2nd Baron Carrington

General election 1837: Wycombe
Party	Candidate	Votes	%
Whig	Robert Smith	Unopposed	
Whig	George Dashwood	Unopposed	
Registered electors		387	
Whig hold			
Whig hold			

General election 1835: Wycombe
Party	Candidate	Votes	%	±%
Whig	Robert Smith	289	51.2	+10.3
Whig	Charles Grey	147	26.1	−5.9
Radical	Benjamin Disraeli	128	22.7	−4.5
Majority		19	3.4	−1.4
Turnout		c. 282	c. 91.3	c. +2.7
Registered electors		309		
Whig hold		Swing	+6.3	
Whig hold		Swing	−1.8	

General election 1832: Wycombe
Party	Candidate	Votes	%
Whig	Robert Smith	179	40.9
Whig	Charles Grey	140	32.0
Radical	Benjamin Disraeli	119	27.2
Majority		21	4.8
Turnout		264	88.6
Registered electors		298	
Whig hold			
Whig hold			

By-election, 26 June 1832: Wycombe
Party	Candidate	Votes	%
Whig	Charles Grey	23	65.7
Radical	Benjamin Disraeli	12	34.3
Majority		11	31.4
Turnout		35	33.7
Registered electors		104	
Whig hold			

- Caused by Baring's resignation

General election 1831: Wycombe
Party	Candidate	Votes	%
Whig	Thomas Baring	Unopposed	
Whig	Robert Smith	Unopposed	
Registered electors		104	
Whig hold			
Whig gain from Nonpartisan			

General election 1830: Wycombe
Party	Candidate	Votes	%
Whig	Thomas Baring	Unopposed	
Non Partisan	John Dashwood-King	Unopposed	
Whig hold			
Non Partisan hold			

== See also ==
- List of parliamentary constituencies in Buckinghamshire
- List of parliamentary constituencies in the South East England (region)
