= Ray Whitney (politician) =

British politician

Sir Ray Whitney OBE

Member of Parliament for Wycombe
- In office 27 April 1978 – 14 May 2001
- Preceded by: Sir John Hall
- Succeeded by: Paul Goodman

Personal details
- Born: 28 November 1930 Northampton, England, United Kingdom
- Died: 15 August 2012 (aged 81)
- Party: Conservative

Sir Raymond William Whitney OBE (28 November 1930 – 15 August 2012) was a British Conservative politician and diplomat. He served as the member of parliament for Wycombe from 1978 to 2001.

== Early life and education ==
Whitney was born in Northampton on 28 November 1930. He was educated at Wellingborough School and the Royal Military Academy Sandhurst, before being commissioned into the Northamptonshire Regiment.

== Diplomatic career ==
He resigned in 1964 in order to join the Diplomatic Service and served from 1966 to 1968 as first secretary at the Office of British Chargé d'Affaires in Peking during the Cultural Revolution. He also served as deputy High Commissioner to Bangladesh between 1973 and 1976, and, in his final appointment, was head of the Information Research Department, the Foreign Office's counter-propaganda department.

== Political career ==
Whitney was elected as (MP) for Wycombe at a by-election in 1978 caused by the death of Sir John Hall. He served as parliamentary private secretary (PPS) to Nigel Lawson and Peter Rees at the Treasury.

Following the 1983 general election he was appointed Parliamentary Under-Secretary of State at the Foreign Office, moving to occupy the same position at the Department of Health and Social Security from October 1984 to September 1986. The Independent characterized Whitney as someone who "combined strongly right-wing views with staunch support of British membership of the European Community."

Whitney stepped down at the 2001 general election, and was succeeded by Paul Goodman.

Parliament of the United Kingdom
Preceded by Sir John Hall	Member of Parliament for Wycombe; 1978–2001	Succeeded by Paul Goodman
