= William Depham =

14th-century English politician

William Depham (fl. 1391–1395) was an English politician.

He was a member (MP) of the Parliament of England for Wycombe in 1391, 1393, 1394 and 1395.
