= Sarah Baring =

English socialite and memoirist (1920–2013)

The Honourable Sarah Baring
- Sarah Baring as a debutante, aged 18
- Born: Hon. Sarah Kathleen Elinor Norton; 20 January 1920
- Died: 4 February 2013 (aged 93)
- Occupations: Socialite, wartime linguist
- Spouses: William Astor, 3rd Viscount Astor (m. 1945; div. 1953) Lt-Col Thomas Baring (m. 1953; div. 1965)
- Children: William Astor, 4th Viscount Astor
- Parent(s): Richard Norton, 6th Baron Grantley; Jean Mary Kinloch

Sarah Kathleen Elinor Baring (née Norton; 20 January 1920 – 4 February 2013) was an English socialite and memoirist, who worked for three years as a linguist at Bletchley Park, the principal centre of Allied code-breaking during the Second World War. She was married to William Astor, 3rd Viscount Astor, from 1945 to 1953.

== Early life ==
Sarah Kathleen Elinor Norton was born on 20 January 1920, the daughter of the filmmaker Richard Norton, 6th Baron Grantley, and his wife, Jean Mary (née Kinloch). At the age of 17 her parents sent her to Munich, where she learned fluent German. Sarah recalled often seeing Adolf Hitler and aides at a tea house; she and a friend made funny faces at the group. Despite the "terrible feeling of fear" in the city they were not disturbed, Sarah said, because the Germans knew that they were English and wanted to maintain good British-German relations.

== Career ==
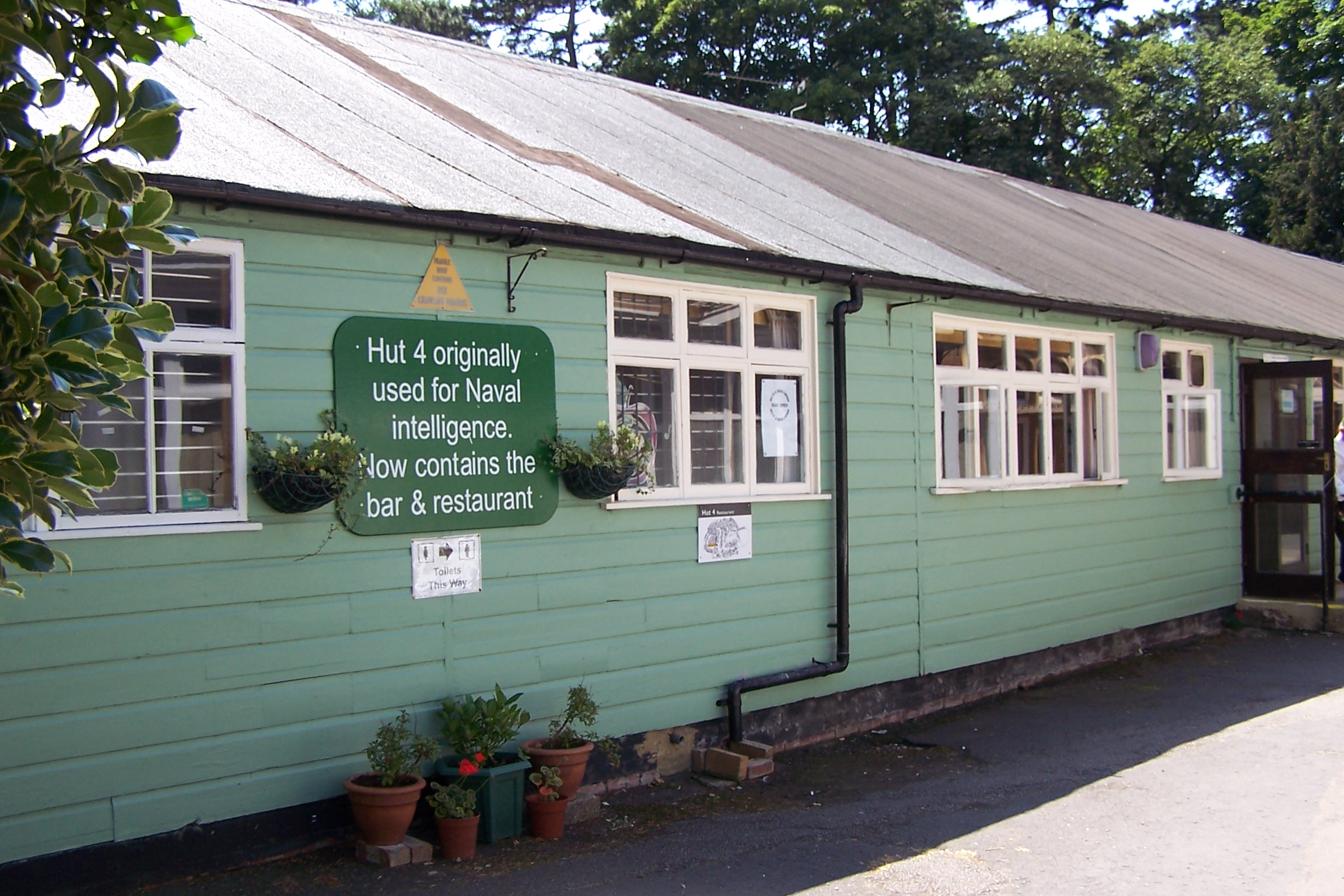
Hut 4, next to the mansion, used during the war for naval intelligence

During the war, she worked for Vogue and the Baltimore Sun for a short time, then as a telephonist at an Air Raid Precautions Centre, before building Hurricane fighter planes at a Hawker Siddeley factory close to Slough. She recalled of this time “I hadn’t expected the work there to be quite as hard as it was, but we were fired up with the desire to make aeroplanes”.

She shared a cottage with a colleague Osla Benning. They were both god-daughters of Lord Louis Mountbatten, who suggested to Sarah that she might "find a nice girl" for his nephew, Prince Philip. Sarah introduced Benning, and she became Prince Philip's first girlfriend.

A few months later, Baring and Benning were both tested on their German language skills, and were posted to Hut 4 at Bletchley Park. They were also billeted together at the White Horse Inn. On a rare day off Baring would catch the express train to London in order to meet with friends at Claridge's. After working at Bletchley Park she was later transferred to the Admiralty's Operational Intelligence Centre.

== Later life ==
In her later years, Baring wrote a memoir about her time in pre-war London society and at Bletchley Park, The Road To Station X.

== Personal life ==
On VE-Day, she attended a cocktail party given by her aunt Lady Brownlow, and was introduced to William Waldorf Astor, eldest son of the 2nd Viscount Astor and his wife, Nancy Astor, the MP. They were engaged after five days, and married a month later on 14 June 1945. She supported his political campaigning.

Their son, William Astor, 4th Viscount Astor, was born in 1951. Her son later became the stepfather of Samantha Cameron. The couple amicably divorced in 1953, after which she married Lt-Col Thomas Michael Baring, a former 10th Royal Hussars officer, polo player, and fine art consultant. The Barings divorced in 1965.

She died on 4 February 2013, aged 93.
