= Walter Frere (MP) =

English politician

Walter Frere (fl. 1381 – 1388), of Wycombe, Buckinghamshire, was an English politician.

He was a relative of late 14th, early 15th century MP William Frere, but the exact connection is unknown.

He was a Member (MP) of the Parliament of England for Wycombe in 1381, 1386 and February 1388.
