= Paul Goodman, Baron Goodman of Wycombe =

British journalist and politician (born 1959)

The Right Honourable The Lord Goodman of Wycombe
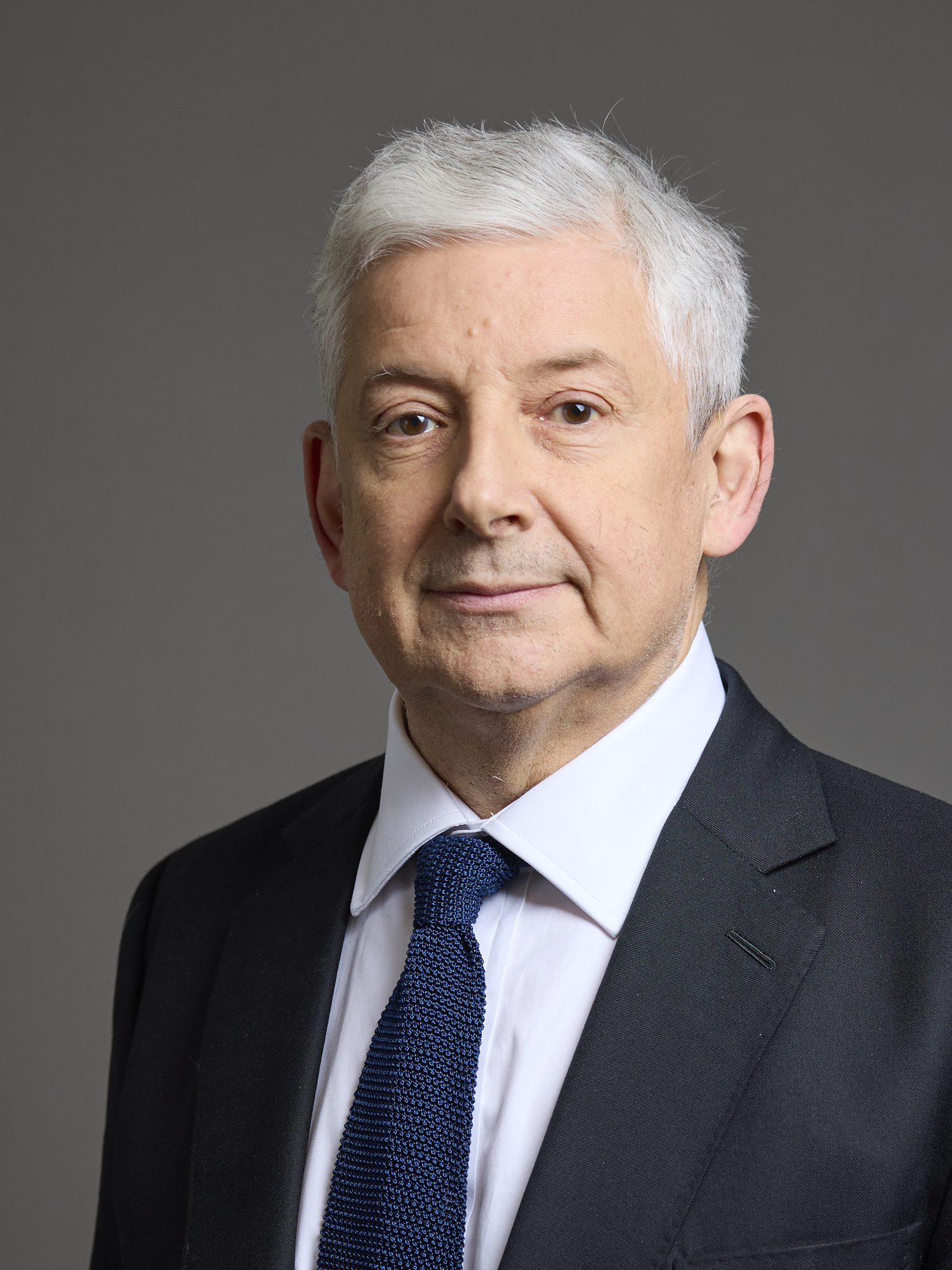
- Official portrait, 2024

Member of the House of Lords
- Lord Temporal
- Life peerage 11 March 2024

Member of Parliament for Wycombe
- In office 7 June 2001 – 12 April 2010
- Preceded by: Ray Whitney
- Succeeded by: Steve Baker

Personal details
- Born: Paul Alexander Cyril Goodman; 17 November 1959 (age 66) London, England
- Party: Conservative
- Spouse: Fiona Gill (m. 1999)
- Children: 1
- Education: Cranleigh School
- Alma mater: University of York (BA)
- Occupation: Politician; journalist

Paul Alexander Cyril Goodman, Baron Goodman of Wycombe (born 17 November 1959) is an English journalist and Conservative Party politician. He was the Member of Parliament (MP) for Wycombe from 2001 to 2010, during which time he was a Shadow Minister shadowing the Department for Communities and Local Government. In 2024, Goodman was elevated to the House of Lords by Prime Minister Rishi Sunak.

From 2013 to 2024, Goodman served as editor of the centre-right political blog ConservativeHome. His work on the blog earned him a reputation for wielding significant influence over the Conservative Party, the centre-left New Statesman magazine calling him the "authoritative commentator or Tory politics" and the 28th most powerful right-wing figure in Britain.

== Early life ==
Paul Goodman was born the son of Jewish parents in London, and converted to Roman Catholicism in his mid-twenties. He was raised in East Sheen, and was privately educated at the Cranleigh School, Surrey before attending the University of York where he was awarded a Bachelor of Arts degree in English literature in 1981. He was Chairman of the Federation of Conservative Students between 1983 and 1984, and was a member of the National Union of Students Executive during the two previous years.

== Political career ==
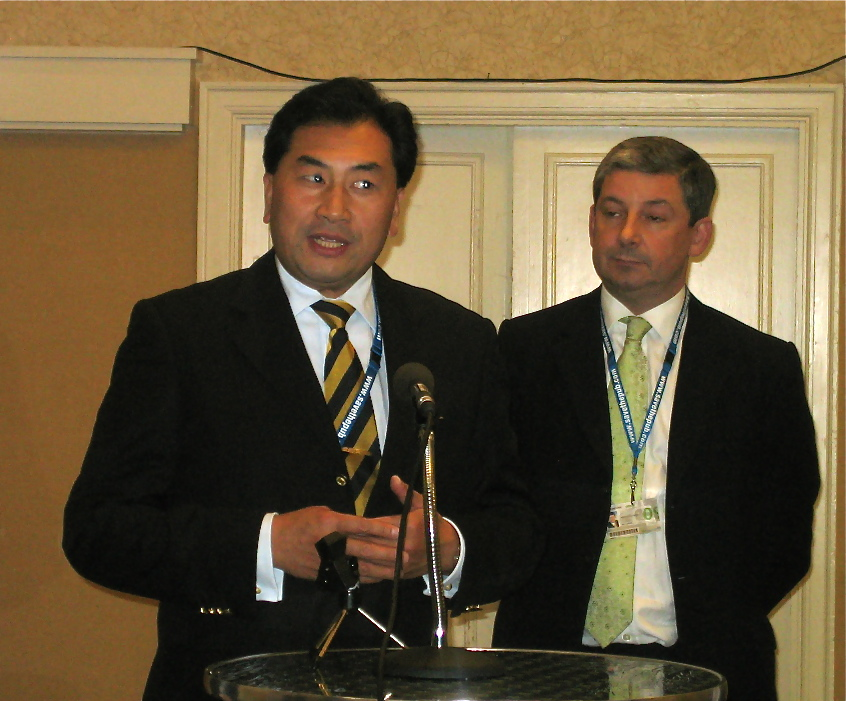
Goodman with Conservative parliamentary candidate George Lee in 2009

In 1977 he worked for a year as a researcher for Michael Mates, the Conservative MP for Petersfield. In 1983 he was the chairman for the Federation of Conservative Students, and was appointed as a director of public affairs at Extel Consultancy in 1984, before becoming a researcher for two years to Tom King, the Secretary of State for Northern Ireland and MP for Bridgwater, in 1985. He was a briefly a member of the policy unit at the City of Westminster Council in 1988 before training as a novice monk at Quarr Abbey in Ryde on the Isle of Wight. He left the abbey in 1990 to take up the position of news editor with the Catholic Herald, before becoming a lead writer with The Daily Telegraph in 1991, moving to be a reporter with The Sunday Telegraph in 1992, before returning to The Daily Telegraph as a comment editor in 1995, remaining as a leader writer since his election to Westminster.

He was elected to the House of Commons for Wycombe in Buckinghamshire at the 2001 general election following the retirement of Ray Whitney. Goodman held Wycombe with a majority of 3,168 and remained the MP there until the 2010 general election. He made his maiden speech on 27 June 2001, in which he recalled the former Prime Minister Benjamin Disraeli, who had once contested his seat.

In parliament he served on the Work and Pensions Select committee 2001–5. He also served for a year as the Parliamentary Private Secretary to the Chairman of the Conservative Party David Davis from 2001, and was promoted to the frontbench by Michael Howard in 2003 as a spokesman on work and pensions. On David Cameron becoming Conservative leader in 2005, Paul Goodman was made a spokesman on Treasury matters. On 5 June 2009, amidst the uncertainty caused by the parliamentary expenses scandal, he announced in the Bucks Free Press that he would not stand for Parliament at the next general election. He said "a House in which professional politics predominates, entrenching and empowering a taxpayer-dependent political class distinct and separate from those who elect them...for better or worse, this future Commons isn't for me".

Goodman was nominated for a life peerage by Prime Minister Rishi Sunak and on 11 March 2024 was created Baron Goodman of Wycombe, of High Wycombe in the County of Buckinghamshire.

== Personal life ==
He has been married to Fiona Mary Ann Gill since 1999 and they have a son, named Daniel.

== Publication ==
- Healthy Choices by Paul Goodman, John Redwood and Angela Watkinson, 2002

Orders of precedence in the United Kingdom
Preceded by The Lord Marks of Hale	Gentlemen; Baron Goodman of Wycombe	Followed by The Lord Jamieson
