= Walford (disambiguation) =

Walford is a fictional London borough in the BBC soap opera EastEnders.

Walford may also refer to:

== Places ==
=== England ===
- Walford, Letton and Newton, Herefordshire
- Walford, Ross-on-Wye, Herefordshire
- Walford, Shropshire
- Walford, Somerset

=== Canada ===
- Walford, Ontario, a community

=== United States ===
- Walford, Iowa

== Schools ==
- Walford Anglican School for Girls in Adelaide, South Australia
- Alec Reed Academy, formerly Walford High School in Northolt in the London Borough of Ealing

== People ==
- Sir Henry Walford Davies (1869–1941), English composer
- Clive Walford (born 1991), American football tight end
- Cornelius Walford (1827–1885), English author on insurance topics
- Edward Walford (1823–1897), English author and historian
- Garth Neville Walford (1882–1915), English Victoria Cross recipient
- John Walford (1762-1789), wife murderer of Over Stowey, Somerset.
- Lionel Walford (1905–1979), American ichthyologist
- Lucy Bethia Walford (1845–1915), Scottish author
- Michael Walford (1915–2002) English cricketer and field hockey player
- Rex Walford (1934–2011), British educator and geographer
- Ricky Walford (born 1963), Australian rugby league player
- Roy Walford, M.D. (1924–2004), Life Extension pioneer
- Steve Walford (born 1958), English football player and coach

== Literature and publishing ==
- Walford's County Families annual volumes

== See also ==
- Watford (disambiguation)
- Walkford
