= Walter Waltham =

English politician

Walter Waltham (fl. 1393–1397), of Wycombe, Buckinghamshire, was an English politician.

He was a member (MP) of the Parliament of England for Wycombe in 1393 and January 1397.
