= Richard Holiman =

English politician

Richard Holiman (fl. 1386–1388) was an English politician.

He was a Member (MP) of the Parliament of England for Wycombe in 1386 and February 1388. No further information on him has been found.
