= John Hall (Wycombe MP) =

British politician

Sir John Hall OBE TD (21 September 1911 – 19 January 1978) was a British Conservative Party politician.

== Education and business career ==
Hall was educated privately and worked as a chartered secretary and company director, including of Viskase and Bass Charrington.

== Political career ==
Hall first stood for Parliament without success in Grimsby in 1950 and Fulham East in 1951. He was elected as Member of Parliament (MP) for Wycombe at a by-election in November 1952. Hall served as an opposition spokesman on Treasury, economic affairs and trade until October 1965. He was an executive member of the 1922 Committee from 1964 to 1966 and vice-chairman of the Conservative parliamentary finance committee from 1965.

He was knighted in July 1973 "for political and public services".

Hall suffered a heart attack in the summer of 1977 and soon announced he would not stand for election again. He died at a hospital in London on 19 January 1978, aged 66. His death triggered the by-election.

== Personal life ==
In 1935, Hall married Nancy Doreen Hampton Blake. They had a son and a daughter. The Halls lived at Carlisle Place, London SW1.

Parliament of the United Kingdom
Preceded by William Astor	Member of Parliament for Wycombe; 1952–1978	Succeeded by Sir Ray Whitney
