= William Carington =

British soldier, courtier and Liberal politician

The Right Honourable Sir William Carington GCVO KCB PC JP
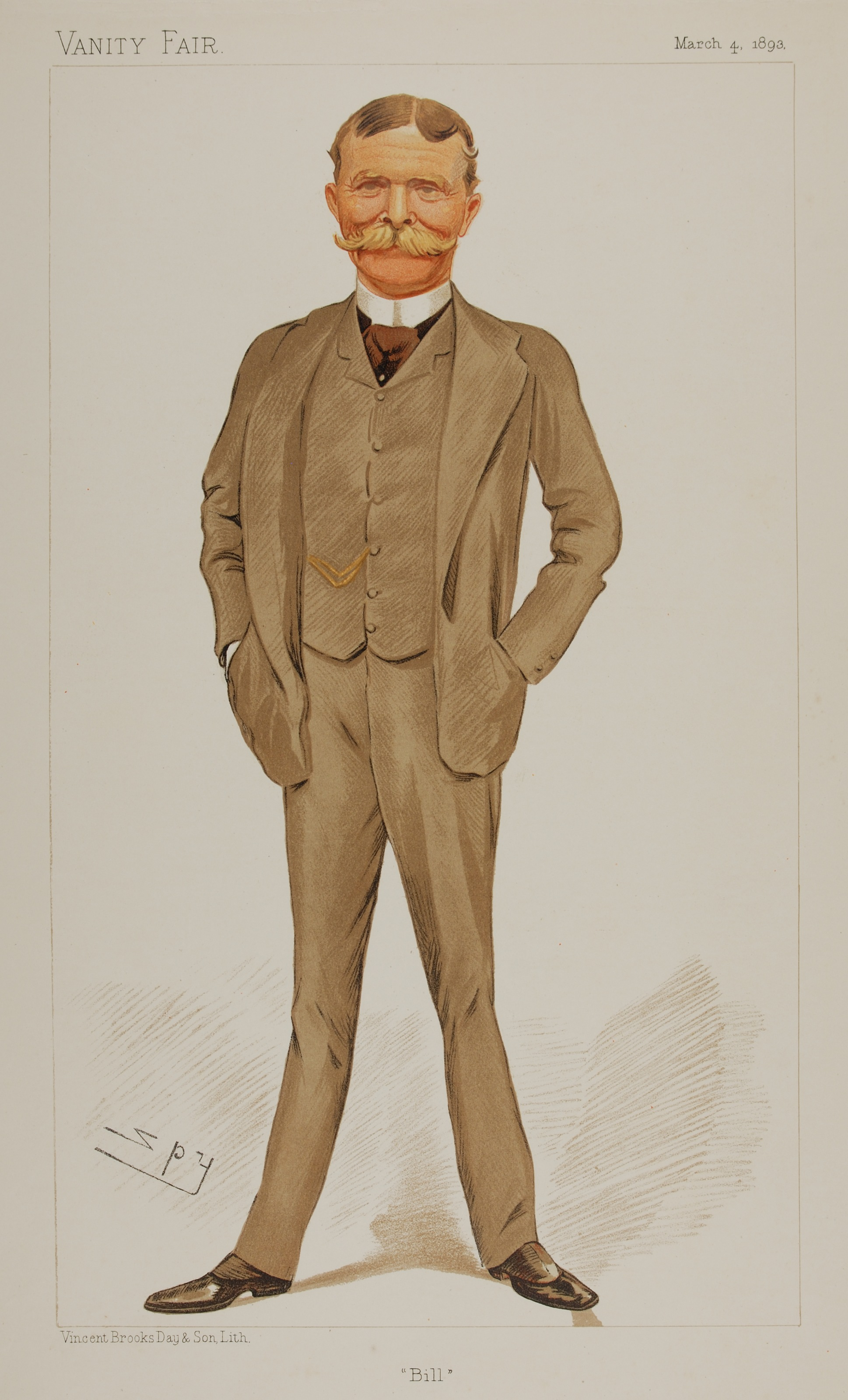
- "Bill", as caricatured by "Spy" (Leslie Ward) in Vanity Fair, March 1893.

Member of Parliament for Wycombe
- In office 1868–1883
- Preceded by: John Remington Mills; Charles Carrington
- Succeeded by: Gerard Smith

Personal details
- Born: William Henry Peregrine Carrington; 28 July 1845
- Died: 7 October 1914 (aged 69)
- Spouse: Juliet Warden
- Parent(s): Robert Carrington, 2nd Baron Carrington; Hon. Charlotte Drummond-Burrell

Sir William Henry Peregrine Carington GCVO KCB PC JP (28 July 1845 – 7 October 1914) was a British soldier, courtier and Liberal politician who sat in the House of Commons from 1868 to 1883

== Biography ==
Born William Carrington, he was the second son of Robert Carrington, 2nd Baron Carrington, and his second wife the Hon. Charlotte Drummond-Burrell, daughter of Peter Drummond-Burrell, 22nd Baron Willoughby de Eresby. He and his two brothers assumed by royal licence the surname of Carington in 1880. He was educated at Eton and served in the Grenadier Guards, achieving the rank of lieutenant-colonel. He fought in the Egyptian Campaign of 1882 and was awarded a medal for his actions.

Carington was elected Member of Parliament for Wycombe in 1868, succeeding his brother Charles, and held the seat until 1883, when he was succeeded by his second cousin Gerard Smith.

Carington was a Groom in Waiting to Queen Victoria from 1880 to 1882. He was acting Master of the Buckhounds from 1883 to 1884, Equerry to Queen Victoria from 1881 to 1901 and an Extra Equerry to King Edward VII from 1901 to 1910. He also served as Comptroller and Treasurer to the Prince of Wales (later King George V) from 1901.

In November 1901, he was invested as a Knight Commander of the Royal Victorian Order (KCVO), and the following January he received the Prussian Order of the Crown, second class, with star, when he accompanied the Prince of Wales on a visit to Berlin for the birthday of Emperor Wilhelm II. In 1910 he was sworn of the Privy Council and was Keeper of the King's Privy Purse 1910–1914.

== Family ==
Carington married Juliet Warden, daughter of Francis Warden, of New York, on 23 September 1871. They had no children. She died in November 1913. Carington only survived her by eleven months and died aged 69. Charles Wynn-Carington, 1st Marquess of Lincolnshire, was his elder brother, and Rupert Carington, 4th Baron Carrington, his younger brother.

Parliament of the United Kingdom
Preceded by John Remington Mills; Hon. Charles Carrington	Member of Parliament for Wycombe; 1868–1883 (representation reduced to one member 1868)	Succeeded by Lt. Col. Gerard Smith
