= Stephen Watford =

English politician

Stephen Watford (fl. 1384–1388), of Wycombe, Buckinghamshire, was an English politician.

He was a Member (MP) of the Parliament of England for Wycombe in April 1384, 1385 and September 1388.
