= 1978 Wycombe by-election =

UK parliamentary by-election

The 1978 Wycombe by-election of 27 April 1978 was held after the death of Conservative Member of Parliament (MP) John Hall. The Conservatives, which ran Ray Whitney, held on to the seat in the by-election with a significantly increased majority.

== Result ==
Wycombe, by-election April 1978
| Party | Candidate | Votes | % | ±% |
|---|---|---|---|---|
| Conservative | Ray Whitney | 29,677 | 59.96 | +13.63 |
| Labour | Trevor Fowler | 14,109 | 28.51 | −2.31 |
| Liberal | Harry Warschauer | 3,665 | 7.41 | −11.94 |
| National Front | Sylvia Jones | 2,040 | 4.12 | +0.62 |
| Majority | | 15,568 | 31.46 | +15.96 |
| Turnout | | 49,491 | | |
| Conservative hold | | Swing | | |
