= William Clerk (MP for Wycombe) =

English politician

William Clerk (fl. 1399–1420), of Wycombe, Buckinghamshire, was an English politician.

He was a Member (MP) of the Parliament of England for Wycombe in 1399 and 1415. He was Mayor of Wycombe in 1419–1420.
