= Mayor of Wycombe =

The following were mayors of Wycombe, Buckinghamshire, England:

- John Sandwell: 1346-9
- Nicholas Sperlyng: 1388-90 and 1397-8
- William atte Dene 1365-6 and 1370–1.
- William Clerk: 1419-20
- John Alley: 1499-1500
- William Alley: 1501-02, 1507-08, 1544-45
- Alderman W. Birch: 1902
