= Roger More (MP) =

Roger More was an English Member of Parliament for Chipping Wycombe in May 1413, 1417, 1419, 1420, May 1421, 1423, 1431 and 1432.
