= William Baring du Pré =

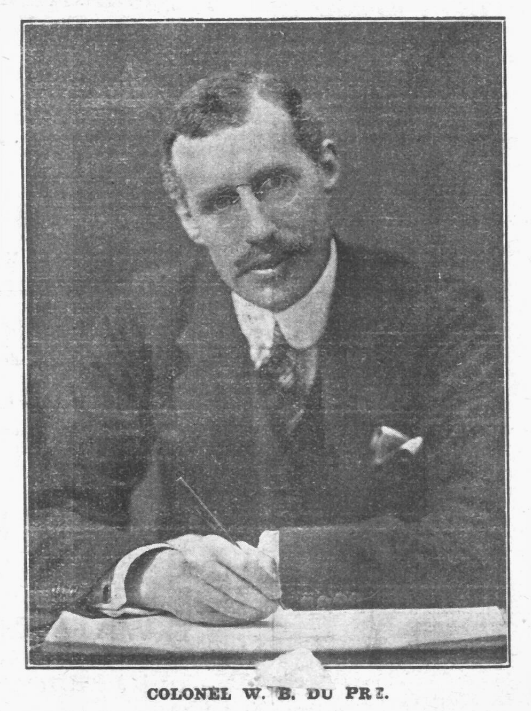
Colonel William Baring du Pré, 1922

Colonel William Baring du Pré, DL (5 April 1875 – 23 August 1946) was a British Conservative Party politician. He was a descendant of James Du Pré and likewise lived at Wilton Park, Beaconsfield from 1896 to 1911; the family subsequently moved to Taplow House, Buckinghamshire.

== Military and Political career ==
Du Pré was educated at Winchester College and the Royal Military Academy, Woolwich, and was originally commissioned into the King's Royal Rifle Corps, from which he resigned as a lieutenant. Following the outbreak of the Second Boer War, he re-commissioned as a lieutenant in the 47th Company, Imperial Yeomanry, on 21 February 1900. He was captured in the "Yeomanry Disaster" at Lindley in May 1900 and held at Barberton prisoner of war camp. He later commanded the 2/1st Leicestershire Royal Horse Artillery (Territorials) and served on the Western Front 1915–18.

He was appointed High Sheriff of Buckinghamshire and deputy lieutenant of the county in 1911 (Coronation Medal, 1911) and was a JP for Bucks.

Du Pré was elected as MP for Wycombe at a by-election in 1914, when the Conservative MP Charles Cripps was elevated to the peerage as Baron Parmoor. He was re-elected at the 1918 general election as a Coalition Conservative, but faced a strong challenge at the 1922 general election from the Liberal candidate Lady Terrington. He held his seat with a majority of 4,473, but in December of the following year, at the 1923 general election, Lady Terrington took the seat with a majority of 1,682. Du Pré was a strong opponent of the women's rights advocated by Terrington, so his defeat was welcomed by women's groups.

== Sporting interests ==
Lt-Col Du Pré, as he was known in the croquet world, was a leading croquet player between the wars. He won the Open Championship twice (1929 and 1934), the Men's Championship on three occasions (1927, 1933 and 1936) and the Champion Cup in 1935. Du Pré represented England in three MacRobertson Shield tournaments, winning on one occasion.

As an administrator Du Pré served on the council of the Croquet Association from 1911 to 1940 and was chairman of council from 1933 to 1935.

Parliament of the United Kingdom
Preceded by Charles Cripps	Member of Parliament for Wycombe; 1914–1923	Succeeded by Lady Terrington
