= John Cotyngham =

English politician

John Cotyngham (fl. 1399–1425), of Wycombe, Buckinghamshire, was an English politician.

Cotyngham was married, his wife's name is unrecorded. They had one son, MP, Robert Cotyngham.

He was a Member (MP) of the Parliament of England for Wycombe in 1399, 1406 and 1425.
