= John Haire, Baron Haire of Whiteabbey =

Haire in 1965, by Walter Bird

John Edwin Haire, Baron Haire of Whiteabbey (30 October 1908 – 7 October 1966) was a British Labour Party politician.

Born in the region of Portadown, County Armagh, Ireland he was the son of John Haire and Mary Tedford. In the 1911 Irish Census the Haire family are documented as residing at 4 Century Street, Portadown. They were of Church of Ireland stock.

Haire graduated from Queen's University, Belfast in 1931 with a Bachelor of Arts (BA) and a Diploma in Education (DipEd). In 1936 he was awarded a Master of Arts (MA). He married Dr. Susanne Elizabeth Kemeny on 30 June 1939.

He fought in the Second World War in the RAF gaining the rank of Squadron Leader.

At the 1945 general election, he was elected as Member of Parliament for Wycombe. In 1948 he starred as a new member of the House of Commons in "Servant of the People", an information film about Parliament's traditions and the roles of MPs. He held the seat at the 1950 general election, but at the 1951 general election he was defeated by the Conservative candidate William Astor. At the by-election the following year, after Astor succeeded to a peerage, he contested the seat again but was again defeated. In his final try for Parliament, in 1955, he narrowly lost the new seat of Eastleigh to the Conservatives.

On 13 May 1965 he was made a life peer with the title Baron Haire of Whiteabbey, of Newtownabbey in the County of Antrim. Whiteabbey was one of seven villages that were merged to form Newtownabbey in Northern Ireland when the town was created on 1 April 1958.

While lecturing on comparative politics at Rutgers University, he suffered a stroke in a downtown New Brunswick, New Jersey bus station, later dying in a local hospital. He was a resident of Chelsea.

Parliament of the United Kingdom
Preceded by Sir Alfred Knox	Member of Parliament for Wycombe; 1945–1951	Succeeded by William Astor
