= Sydney Buxton, 1st Earl Buxton =

British politician (1853–1934)

The Right Honourable The Earl Buxton GCMG PC
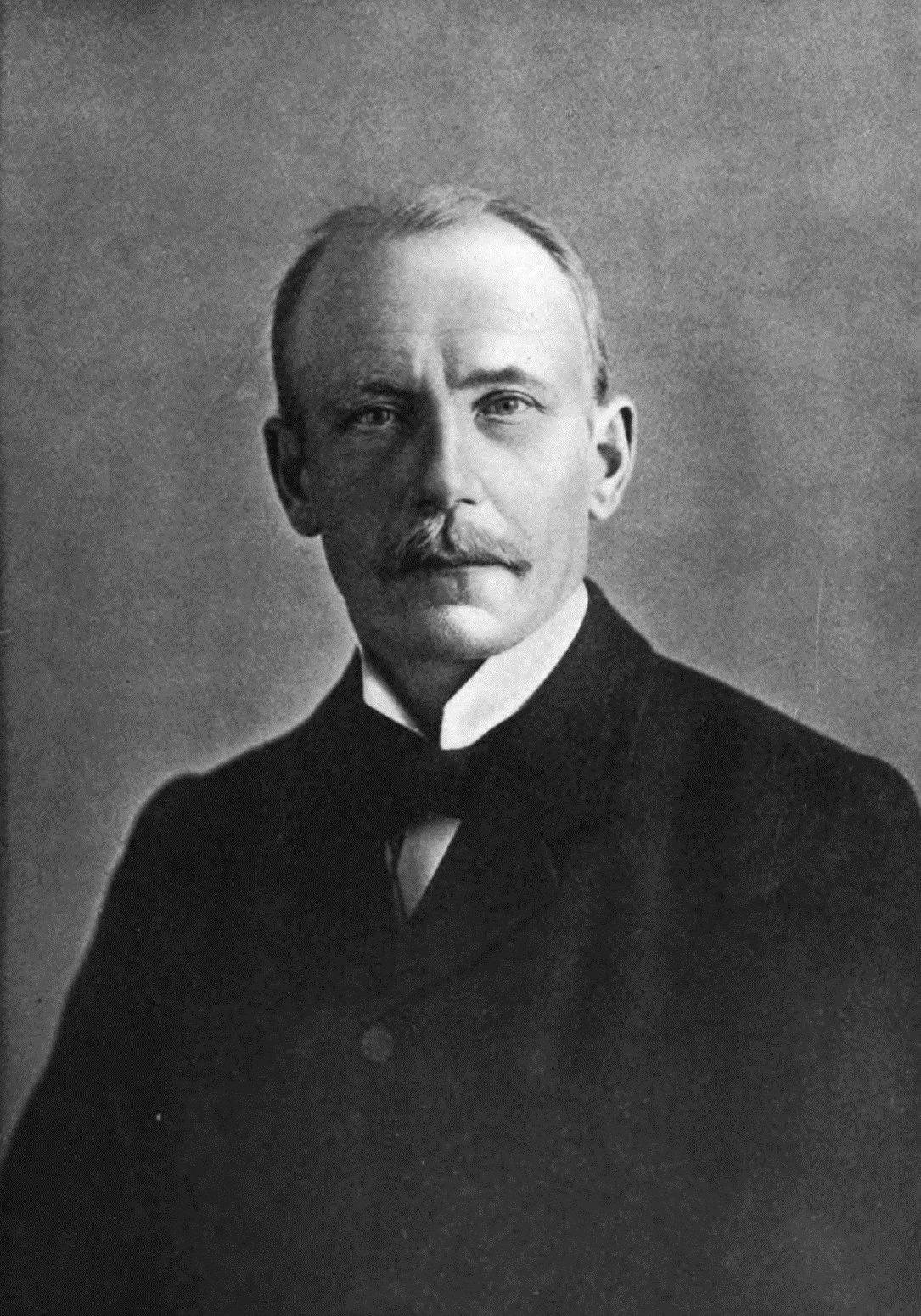

Governor-General of South Africa
- In office 8 September 1914 – 17 November 1920
- Monarch: George V
- Prime Minister: Louis Botha; Jan Smuts
- Preceded by: The Viscount Gladstone
- Succeeded by: Prince Arthur of Connaught

President of the Board of Trade
- In office 14 February 1910 – 11 February 1914
- Prime Minister: H. H. Asquith
- Preceded by: Winston Churchill
- Succeeded by: John Burns

Postmaster General
- In office 10 December 1905 – 14 February 1910
- Prime Minister: Henry Campbell-Bannerman; H. H. Asquith
- Preceded by: The Lord Stanley
- Succeeded by: Herbert Samuel

Personal details
- Born: 25 October 1853 London, England
- Died: 15 October 1934 (aged 80) Newtimber, West Sussex, England
- Party: Liberal
- Spouse(s): Constance Mary Lubbock (m. 1882; died 1892) Mildred Anne Smith (m. 1896)
- Children: 6
- Parent: Charles Buxton (father)
- Education: Trinity College, Cambridge
- Profession: Member of Parliament

Sydney Buxton circa 1895

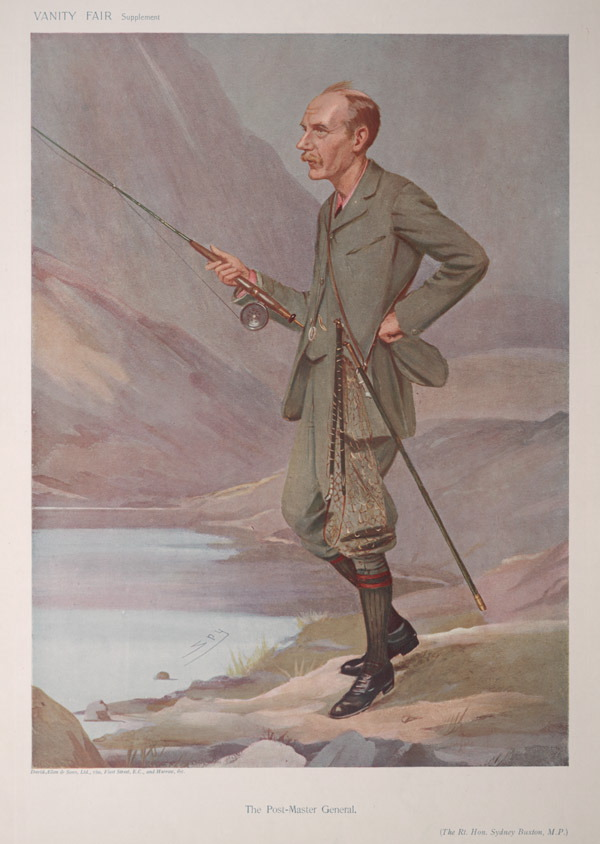
"The Post-Master General". Caricature by Spy published in Vanity Fair in 1907

Sydney Charles Buxton, 1st Earl Buxton, GCMG, PC (25 October 1853 – 15 October 1934) was a radical British Liberal politician of the late 19th and early 20th centuries. He also served as the second Governor-General of South Africa from 1914 to 1920.

== Background and education ==
Buxton was the son of Charles Buxton and grandson of social reformer Sir Thomas Fowell Buxton, 1st Baronet. His mother was Emily Mary, daughter of the physician and traveller Sir Henry Holland, 1st Baronet. He was born in London and educated at Clifton College and Trinity College, Cambridge, and was a member of the London School Board from 1876 to 1882.

== Political career ==
In 1880, Buxton became prominent in political circles by the publication of his Handbook to the Political Questions of the Day, a work which eventually went through 11 editions. That same year, he ran for Parliament for Boston, but lost. However, he became an MP in 1883 by winning a by-election in Peterborough. He was defeated in the 1885 general election, but returned to Parliament the very next year, representing Poplar. He would represent this constituency in Parliament until 1914.

From 1892 to 1895, Buxton served as Under-Secretary of State for the Colonies. In 1905, he earned his first Cabinet post, that of Postmaster-General. In this capacity he introduced such services as penny postage to the United States, the Canadian magazine post, and cheap postage for the blind. In 1910, Buxton was named president of the Board of Trade; in this position he oversaw the passage or amendment of many trade and commerce laws. Upon the sinking of the RMS Titanic in 1912, he asked Lord Loreburn, the Lord Chancellor, to appoint a commission of inquiry into the disaster. This commission eventually came to be headed by Lord Mersey.

In February 1914, Buxton was appointed Governor-General of South Africa, and on 11 May of that year he was raised to the peerage as Viscount Buxton, of Newtimber in the County of Sussex. A revolt by some of the South African populace on the outbreak of the First World War temporarily threatened his safety, but the country's Prime Minister, General Louis Botha, immediately attached the Union of South Africa to Britain. Thereafter, Lord Buxton and General Botha formed an effective partnership, planning and executing South African actions in the war, including the invasion of the neighbouring German colony of South West Africa. Lord Buxton travelled widely throughout South Africa, and endeared himself to the people. Upon his retirement in 1920, the people demonstrated their affection for him. He continued his interest in South African affairs after returning to England, serving as president of the African Society from 1920 to 1933.

He was created Earl Buxton on 8 November 1920, and continued to be a member of the Liberal Party, often supporting his close friend and colleague Sir Edward Grey. In his later years, he had to undergo amputation of his leg due to a knee injury sustained earlier in his life.

He died at Newtimber on 15 October 1934.

== Marriages ==
Lord Buxton was twice married, firstly in 1882 to Constance Mary Lubbock (died 1892), second daughter of John Lubbock, and secondly in 1896 to Mildred Anne Smith, elder daughter of Hugh Colin Smith, governor of the Bank of England, of Mount Clare, Roehampton, a sister of the banker Vivian Smith and of Admiral Sir Aubrey Smith, RN.

By his first wife, he had two sons and one daughter, of whom the sons both died in his lifetime. By his second wife, he had one son and two daughters, of whom the son and the elder daughter died in his lifetime.

=== Issue ===
By his first wife, Constance Mary Lubbock (died 3 November 1892):

- Charles Sydney Buxton (26 May 1884 – 31 August 1911); died unmarried. He proposed marriage to Octavia Wilberforce (1888–1963), a descendant of the reformer, but she refused him.
- Kenneth Sydney Buxton (4 September 1886 – 27 August 1894); died in childhood, aged seven.
- Lady Phyllis Sydney Buxton (17 April 1888 – 27 January 1942), later Phyllis Ponsonby OBE; married 23 September 1918 the Rev. Maurice George Jesser Ponsonby (1880–1943), a grandson of Charles Ponsonby, 2nd Baron de Mauley. The couple had one son and three daughters who survived to adulthood, their eldest daughter having died young.

By his second wife, Mildred Anne, Countess Buxton DBE JP (1866–1955):

- Lady Doreen Maria Josepha Sydney Buxton (29 November 1897 – 28 July 1923), a fraternal twin; married 24 January 1918 Charles Alfred Euston Fitzroy, a scion of the Dukes of Grafton. She died aged 25, shortly after the birth of her third child. After her death, her husband remarried. His second wife, Lucy Eleanor Barnes (died 1943), was a first cousin of his first wife through her Buxton mother, in 1924. Twice widowed, he married, thirdly, in 1944. He succeeded to the dukedom in August 1936 when a young cousin, The 9th Duke of Grafton, was killed in a motoring race.
- The Hon Denis Bertram Sydney Buxton (29 November 1897 – 9 October 1917), a fraternal twin; killed in action, aged 19, Passchendaele, as a Second Lieutenant in the Coldstream Guards. At the time of his death, he was his father's only surviving son and heir to his viscountcy. The location of his grave is unknown and he is commemorated on Panel Nine of the Tyne Cot Cemetery, a memorial bearing the names of some 35,000 men of the British and New Zealand forces who have no known grave, nearly all of whom died between August 1917 and November 1918.
- Lady Alethea Constance Dorothy Sydney Buxton (2 August 1910 – 25 July 2004); married Venerable Peter Charles Eliot, TD, MBE (30 October 1910 – 1995), son of Edward Granville Eliot (himself grandson of The 3rd Earl of St Germans) and Clare Louise Phelips, on 12 July 1934. They had no issue, and Lady Alethea died aged 93 in 2004.

Since all his sons died unmarried in his lifetime, his titles became extinct at his death. Earl Buxton was survived by his second wife Mildred (died 1955) and his youngest daughter Lady Althea Eliot (died 2004), and by eight grandchildren including the future Duke of Grafton (1919–2011).

== Works ==
- Handbook to Political Questions of the Day (1880).
- Mr. Gladstone's Irish Bills (1886).
- Finance and Politics: An Historical Study, 1783–1885. Volume I and Volume II (1888).
- Mr. Gladstone as Chancellor of the Exchequer (1901).
- Fishing and Shooting (1902).
- The Arguments on either side of the Fiscal Question (1903).
- General Botha (1924).

Parliament of the United Kingdom
Preceded by Hampden Whalley; John Wentworth-FitzWilliam	Member of Parliament for Peterborough; 1883–1885; With: Hon. John Wentworth-FitzWilliam	Succeeded by John Wentworth-FitzWilliam
Preceded by Henry Green	Member of Parliament for Poplar; 1886–1914	Succeeded by Alfred Yeo
Political offices
Preceded by Baron Henry de Worms	Under-Secretary of State for the Colonies; 1892–1895	Succeeded by The Earl of Selborne
Preceded by Lord Stanley	Postmaster General; 1905–1910	Succeeded by Herbert Samuel
Preceded by Winston Churchill	President of the Board of Trade; 1910–1914	Succeeded by John Burns
Preceded by The Viscount Gladstone	Governor-General of South Africa; 1914–1920	Succeeded by Prince Arthur of Connaught
Peerage of the United Kingdom
New creation	Earl Buxton; 1920–1934	Extinct
New creation	Viscount Buxton; 1914–1934	Extinct
