= Randal Smith, 2nd Baron Bicester =

English peer and banker (1898–1968)

- Born: Randal Hugh Vivian Smith; 9 January 1898; London
- Died: 15 January 1968 (aged 70)
- Education: Eton
- Alma mater: Royal Military College, Sandhurst
- Occupation(s): Businessman; Public official
- Spouse: Dorothea Gwenllian James (1897–1974)
- Father: Vivian Smith, 1st Baron Bicester
- Relatives: Walter James, 3rd Baron Northbourne (father-in-law)

Randal Hugh Vivian Smith, 2nd Baron Bicester (9 January 1898 – 15 January 1968), was an English hereditary peer and merchant banker in the City of London.

== Biography ==
=== Early life ===
Smith was born on 9 January 1898 in London. He was the eldest son of the banker Vivian Smith (later created first Baron Bicester) and his wife Lady Sybil Mary McDonnell, a daughter of William McDonnell, 6th Earl of Antrim, and a nephew of Admiral Sir Aubrey Smith. He was educated at Eton and the Royal Military College, Sandhurst.

=== Career ===
He served with the 17th Lancers, rising to the rank of lieutenant.

During his business years, he served as a director of Morgan, Grenfell & Co., Shell Transport and Trading, Vickers and the Bank of England. He was High Sheriff of Oxfordshire in 1945 and succeeded to his father's title of Baron Bicester in 1956.

=== Personal life and death ===
On 29 November 1922, he married Dorothea Gwenllian James, a daughter of Walter James, 3rd Baron Northbourne. They had two daughters.

He was killed in 1968, aged 70, in a motor accident. Without male issue, his title passed to his nephew, Angus Smith.

== Ancestry ==
Ancestors of Randal Smith, 2nd Baron Bicester

16. John Smith (1767–1842)
8. John Abel Smith (1802–1871)
17. Elizabeth Tucker (1773–1809)
4. Hugh Colin Smith (1836–1910)
18. Sir Samuel Clarke-Jervoise, 1st Bt (1770–1852)
9. Anne Jervoise (died 1858)
19. Elizabeth Griffenhoofe
2. Vivian Smith, 1st Baron Bicester (1867–1956)
20. Robert Adeane
10. Henry John Adeane (1789–1847)
21. Annabella Blake
5. Constance Adeane (died 1918)
22. John Stanley, 1st Baron Stanley of Alderley (1766–1850)
11. Matilda Stanley (died 1850)
23. Maria Holroyd (c. 1771 – 1863)
1. Randal Smith, 2nd Baron Bicester
24. Lord Mark Kerr (1776–1840)
12. Mark McDonnell, 5th Earl of Antrim (1814–1869)
25. Charlotte MacDonnell, 3rd Countess of Antrim (1779–1835)
6. William McDonnell, 6th Earl of Antrim (1851–1918)
26. Maj. Turner Macan
13. Jane Macan (c. 1825 – 1892)
27. Harriet Sneyd
3. Lady Sybil McDonnell (1876–1859)
28. Charles Grey, 2nd Earl Grey (1764–1845)
14. Lt.Gen. Charles Grey (1804–1870)
7. Lady Louisa Grey (1855–1949)
30. Sir Thomas Farquhar, 2nd Bt (1775–1836)
15. Caroline Farquhar (1814–1890)
31. Sybella Rockcliffe (died 1869)

Honorary titles
| Preceded by Henry Beaufoy | High Sheriff of Oxfordshire; 1945 | Succeeded by Ellis Chinnery |
Peerage of the United Kingdom
| Preceded by Vivian Smith | Baron Bicester; 1956–1968 | Succeeded by Angus Smith |
