= Mildred Buxton, Countess Buxton =

British social activist and philanthropist (1866-1955)

Mildred Anne Buxton Countess Buxton GBE JP
- Born: 29 June 1866; St George Hanover Square, London, England
- Died: 7 December 1955 (aged 89); Newtimber Place, Mid Sussex, England
- Spouse: Sydney Buxton (m. 1896; died 1934)
- Children: 3
- Parents: Hugh Colin Smith (father); Constance Maria Josepha Adeane (mother)
- Relatives: Vivian Smith (brother); Aubrey Smith (brother)

Mildred Anne Buxton, Countess Buxton, GBE, JP (née Smith; 29 June 1866 – 7 December 1955), was a British social activist and philanthropist.

== Biography ==
Buxton was born in St George Hanover Square, London, the daughter of Hugh Colin Smith of Mount Clare, London, and Constance Maria Josepha (née Adeane). She was baptised 23 July 1866 Saint Thomas Church in Portman Square, Westminster.

She married politician Sydney Buxton, Under-Secretary of State for the Colonies, in 1896, and had three children. She was active in social work when her husband was Governor-General of South Africa from 1914 to 1920. In 1917, their only son, 2nd Lt. Hon. Denis Buxton, was killed in action during the First World War. In Cape Town, she and her husband founded a children's hospital in memory of their only son who was killed in action in France.

When they returned from South Africa, the Buxtons settled in Newtimber Place, a Grade I listed country house in Sussex, where Lady Buxton became a Justice of the Peace. Lord Buxton died in 1934, at which point his titles became extinct. In 1935, she donated nearly 150 acres of downland at Newtimber Hill to the National Trust.

As a result of her marriage, she was styled as Viscountess Buxton, effective 11 May 1914, and later as the Countess Buxton, effective 8 November 1920.

== Marriage and issue ==
She married Sydney Buxton, first and last Earl Buxton, son of Charles Buxton and Emily Mary Holland, on 7 July 1896 at Roehampton, Surrey. By his first wife, he had two sons (both of whom predeceased him) and a daughter.

The Buxtons had three children: a twin daughter and son in 1897 and a daughter in 1910.

- 2nd Lt. Hon. Denis Bertram Sydney Buxton (29 November 1897 – 9 October 1917), killed in the First World War
- Lady Doreen Maria Josepha Sydney Buxton (29 November 1897 – 28 July 1923), married 24 January 1918 Charles Alfred Euston Fitzroy, a scion of the dukes of Grafton. She died aged 25, shortly after the birth of her third child. After her death, her husband remarried. His second wife, Lucy Eleanor Barnes (died 1943), was a first cousin of his first wife through her Buxton mother, in 1924. He succeeded to the dukedom in 1936 when a young cousin, the 9th Duke of Grafton, was killed in a motoring race.
- Lady Althea Constance Dorothy Sydney Buxton (2 August 1910 – 25 July 2004), married Ven. Peter Charles Eliot, the Archdeacon of Worcester

Two of their children predeceased them both. Denis, their only son and only heir to the titles, was killed in action in the Battle of Passchendaele while serving with the Coldstream Guards in the First World War. His twin sister, Lady Maria, died in 1923.

== Honours ==
She was invested as a Dame Grand Cross, Order of the British Empire (GBE) in 1919, in recognition for her social work.

== Death ==
She died at Newtimber Place on 7 December 1955, aged 89.
