= Charles Hatchett =

British chemist (1765–1847)

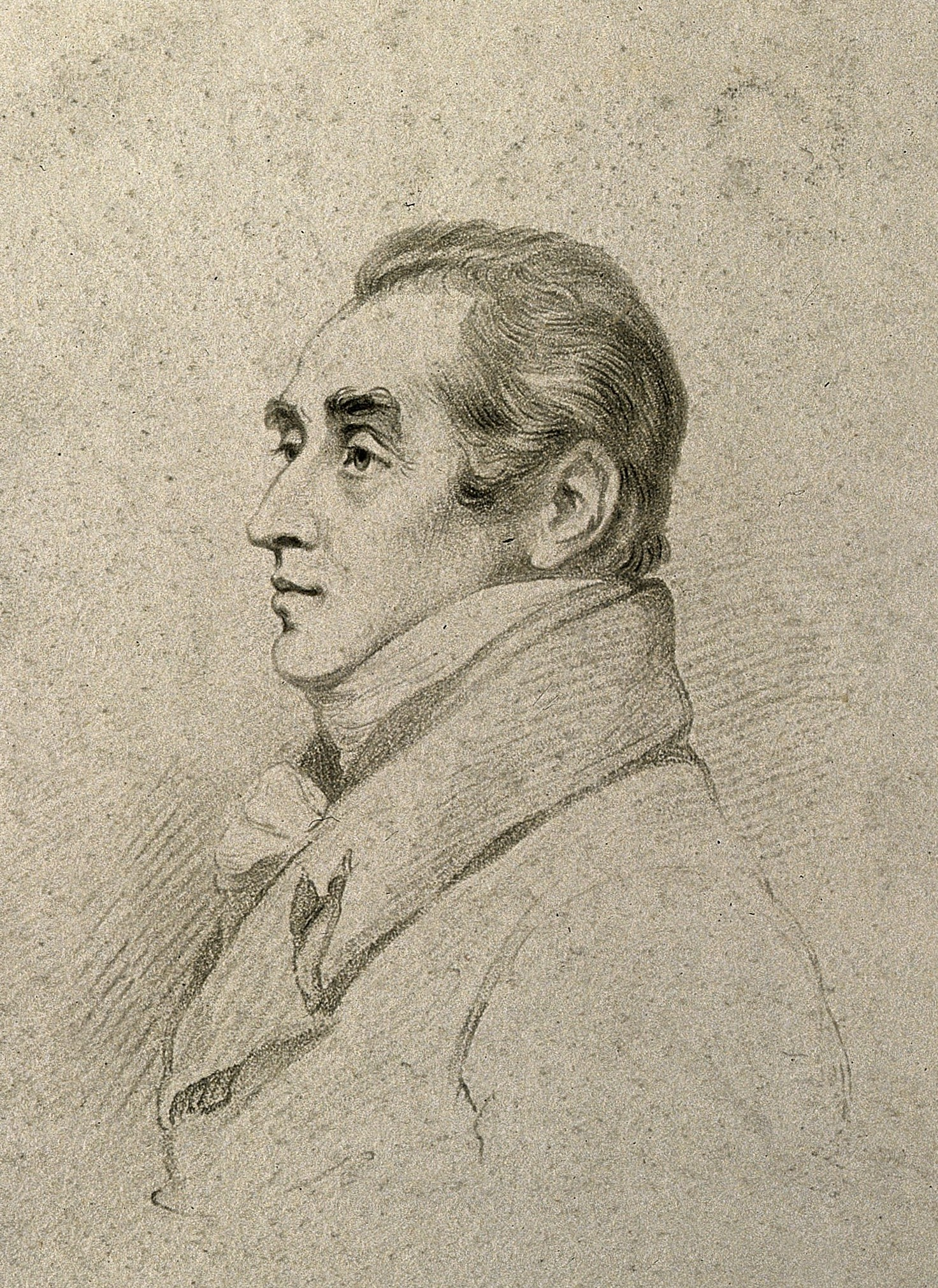
- Etching of Hatchett by Frederick Christian Lewis
- Born: 2 January 1765; Long Acre, London, UK
- Died: 10 March 1847 (aged 82); Chelsea, London, UK
- Known for: Discovery of niobium
- Scientific career
- Workplaces: British Museum

Charles Hatchett FRS FRSE (2 January 1765 – 10 March 1847) was an English mineralogist and analytical chemist who discovered the element niobium, for which he proposed the name "columbium".

Hatchett was elected a Fellow of the Linnaean Society in 1795, and of the Royal Society in 1797. Hatchett was elected to the Literary Club in London in 1809 and became its treasurer in 1829.

== Life ==
Charles Hatchett was born in Long Acre, London to John Hatchett (1729–1806), and Elizabeth Hatchett. John Hatchett was "(one of) the coachbuilders of London of the greatest celebrity". He later became a magistrate in Hammersmith. Charles Hatchett attended a private school, Fountayne's, in Marylebone Park, and was a self-taught mineralogist and analytical chemist.

On 24 March 1786, Charles Hatchett married Elizabeth Martha Collick (1756–1837) at St Martin-in-the-Fields. Their children included:

1. John Charles Hatchett (bapt 27 January 1788 St Martin-in-the-Fields)
2. His daughter, Anna Frederica Hatchett, married the chemist William Thomas Brande.

Following their marriage, Hatchett and his wife traveled extensively in Poland and Russia for 2 years before settling in Hammersmith. In 1790, Hatchett again had the opportunity to travel extensively, when his father sent him to deliver a coach to Catherine the Great in St. Petersburg. With an introduction from Sir Joseph Banks, he visited chemist Martin Klaproth, geologist and botanist Peter Pallas, Neapolitan mineralogist Andrea Savaresi, and other scientists.

In 1796 Hatchett took another long tour, this time through England and Scotland, where he visited geological sites, mines, and factories. His diary of this trip was edited by Arthur Raistrick and published in 1967 as The Hatchett diary: a tour through the counties of England and Scotland in 1796 visiting their mines and manufactories.

== Chemistry ==
Charles Hatchett's work on chemistry occurred mostly between 1796 and 1806, a ten-year period. In 1796, he published "An analysis of the Corinthian molybdate of lead", resolving a dispute over the nature of the mineral. In 1797 he was elected a Fellow of The Royal Society, largely as a result of this work. In more than 20 additional papers, he addressed the chemistry of minerals, resins and natural products. In 1800 Hatchett may have opened a small chemical works at Chiswick in London.

In 1798, Hatchett was asked by members of the Privy Council to work with Henry Cavendish and assess "the state of the coins of the realm" to ensure that they were not being adulterated. He produced a 152-page-long report in 1803. He concluded that 'there was no important defect in the composition or quantity of the standard gold'.

Hatchett developed a collection of over 7000 minerals, which he sold to the British Museum in London in 1799. He agreed to organize the museum's mineral collection, but retained the right to remove and analyze portions of some of the specimens.

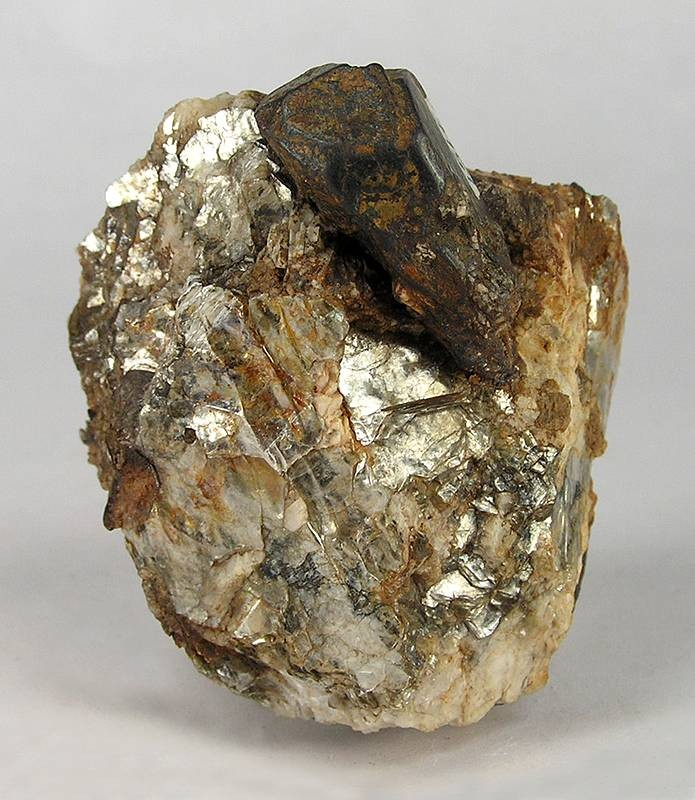
The mineral columbite

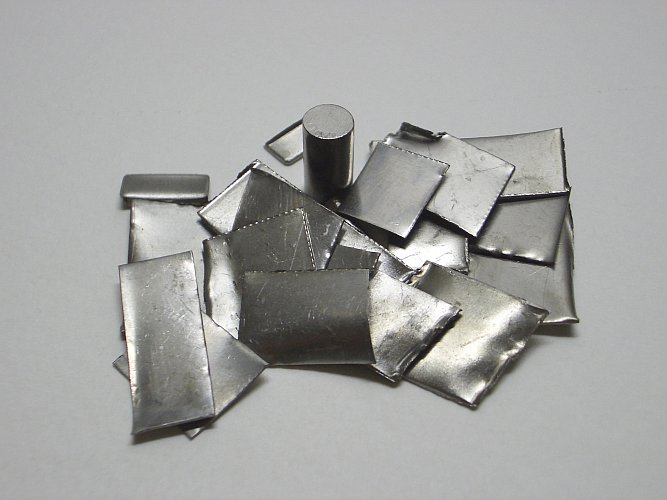
Purified Niobium, the element Hatchett found and named columbium

In 1801, Hatchett analyzed a piece of columbite from the collection at the British Museum. Columbite turned out to be a very complex mineral, and Hachett discovered that it contained a "new earth" which implied the existence of a new element. Lavoisier had defined the term "element" a mere 13 years previously. Hatchett called this new element "columbium" (Cb) in honour of Christopher Columbus, the discoverer of America. On 26 November of that year he announced his discovery before the Royal Society.

In 1802 Anders Gustaf Ekeberg (1767–1813) announced the discovery of another new element, "tantalum". For many years, there was confusion over whether columbium and tantalum were the same. In 1846, German chemist Heinrich Rose argued that there were two additional elements in tantalite, which he named niobium and pelopium for the children of the Cyclops. Eventually, Rose's niobium (atomic number 41) was found to be identical to Hatchett's columbium. In 1949, the name niobium was chosen for element 41 at the 15th Conference of the Union of Chemistry in Amsterdam.

== Publications ==
- Analysis of Magnetical Pyrites (1804)
- Treatise on Spikenard of the Ancients (1836)

== Later life ==
After his father's death, Hatchett largely gave up his activities as a chemist. He inherited his father's coach-making business and pursued interests in collecting books (including a First Folio) manuscripts, paintings, and musical instruments. His loss was lamented by colleagues such as Thomas Thomson (1773–1852), who wrote that Hatchett "was an active chemist…but unfortunately this most amiable and accomplished man has been lost to science for more than a quarter of a century; the baneful effects of wealth, and cares of a lucrative and extensive business, having completely waned him from scientific pursuits".

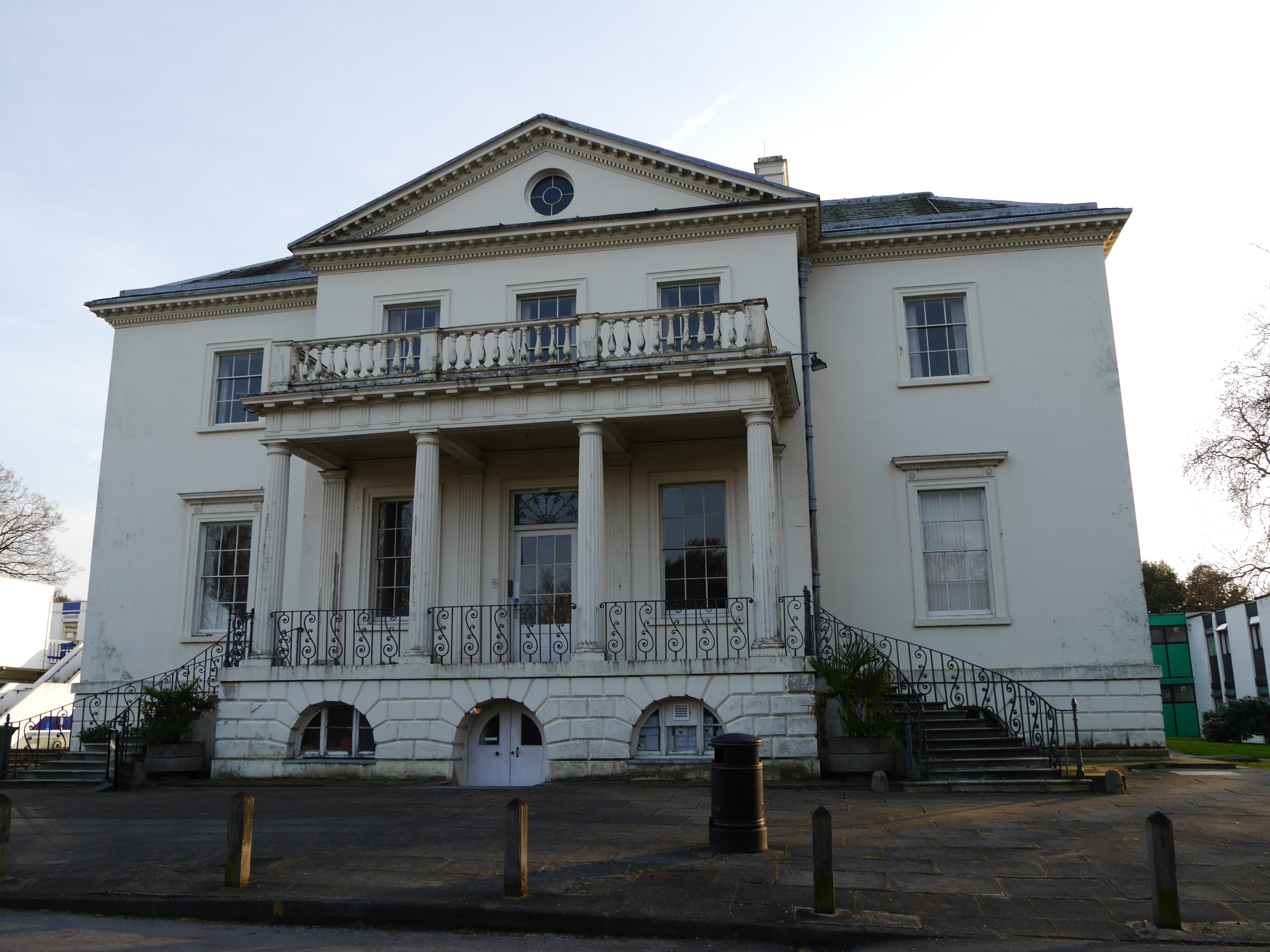
Mount Clare, front view

Hatchett lived at Mount Clare, Roehampton from 1807 to 1819. It has been described as "a little estate built in a fine Italian style" with nearby "a very well-equipped laboratory". The house was designed by Sir Robert Taylor for George Clive, with modifications by the Italian architect Placido Columbani in 1780. The gardens were laid out by Capability Brown in 1774.

In 1818 Hatchett either bought back or chose to no longer lease out the house that had been built by his father in 1771, Belle Vue, 92 Cheyne Walk, in Chelsea, London. A grade II listed building, it has a large central portion with bay windows back and front, and two wings. It overlooks gardens and the River Thames. He lived there for the rest of his life. Elizabeth, his wife, predeceased him in 1837.

Hatchett himself died at Belle Vue House in 1847, and is buried at St Laurence's Church, Upton-cum-Chalvey, Slough, the same church where his friend William Herschel is interred.

== Recognition ==
Hatchett was awarded the Copley Medal by the Royal Society in 1798. In 1828, he was recognized by the Royal Institution. Hatchett, Humphry Davy, William Thomas Brande, William Hyde Wollaston, Michael Faraday and John Frederic Daniell received a gold medal for their discoveries in chemistry. The award was given by John Fuller, founder of the Institution's Fullerian Chair of Chemistry.

In 1979, the Companhia Brasileira de Metalurgia e Mineração established the Charles Hatchett Award. It is presented by the Institute of Materials, Minerals and Mining ("IOM3") (London), yearly, to a noted metallurgist. The award is given for "the best research on the science and technology of niobium and its alloys". The medal is cast in pure niobium.
