= Baron Bicester =

Barony in the Peerage of the United Kingdom

Arms of Smith: Or, a chevron cotised sable between three demi-griffins couped of the last the two in chief respecting each other

Baron Bicester, of Tusmore in the County of Oxford, is a title in the Peerage of the United Kingdom. It was created on 29 June 1938 for the banker Vivian Smith. As of 2018 the title is held by his great-grandson, the fifth Baron, who succeeded his first cousin once removed in 2016.

The Barons Bicester are related to the Barons Carrington. The first Baron Bicester's great-grandfather, John Smith MP (1767–1842), was the youngest brother of Robert Smith, 1st Baron Carrington. Also, John Smith's father, Abel Smith MP (1717–1788), had two elder brothers: George Smith (1714/15–1769), created a baronet in 1757 (see Bromley baronets), and John Smith (born 1716), the great-grandfather of Julian Pauncefote, 1st Baron Pauncefote.

== Baron Bicester (1938) ==
- Vivian Hugh Smith, 1st Baron Bicester (1867–1956)
- Randal Hugh Vivian Smith, 2nd Baron Bicester (1898–1968), son of his predecessor
- Angus Edward Vivian Smith, 3rd Baron Bicester (1932–2014), nephew of his predecessor
- Hugh Charles Vivian Smith, 4th Baron Bicester (1934–2016), brother of his predecessor
- Charles James Vivian Smith, 5th Baron Bicester (born 1963), first cousin once removed of his predecessor

The heir apparent is his son, Milo Louis Vivian Smith (born 2007).

=== Male-line family tree ===
Male-line family tree, Barons Bicester.

Vivian Smith; 1st Baron Bicester; 1867–1956
Randal Smith; 2nd Baron Bicester; 1898–1968	Lt Col. Stephen Smith; 1903–1952	Maj. Hugh Smith; 1910–1978
John Smith; 1930–1957	Angus Smith; 3rd Baron Bicester; 1932–2014	Hugh Smith; 4th Baron Bicester; 1934–2016	George Smith; 1934–2012
Charles Smith; 5th Baron Bicester born 1963
Milo Smith born 2007

== See also ==
- Baron Carrington
- Bromley baronets
- Bicester
- Smith's Bank
