= Albert George Sandeman =

English banker (1833-1923)

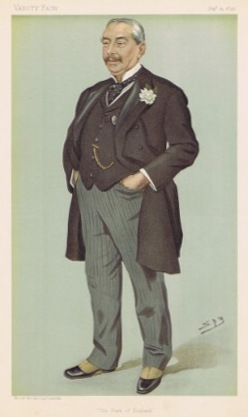
Caricature of Sandeman by "Spy" in Vanity Fair, 1895

Albert George Sandeman (21 October 1833 – 6 January 1923) was an English businessman and the 100th Governor of the Bank of England.

== Early life ==
He was born the eldest of the nine children of George Glas Sandeman and his wife Elizabeth Forster. His father was head of the Sandeman wine importing company. He entered the family business at the age of 16 and at 20 was sent to work at the Porto office in Portugal.

== Career ==
He became a director of the London Dock Company, and in 1866 a director of the Bank of England. He was appointed High Sheriff of Surrey for 1872–73.

On his father's death in 1888 he became chairman of the family business of Geo. G. Sandeman & Sons Ltd. In 1894 he was made Deputy Governor of the Bank of England, becoming Governor the following year until 1897. He also served as a Commissioner of Income Tax for the City of London and as President of the London Chamber of Commerce (1898). Sandeman's tenure as Governor occurred during the Panics of 1893 and 1896.

== Personal life ==
He married Maria Carlota Perpetua de Moraes Sarmento in Portugal in 1895. The couple had at least six children, including at least two sons and four daughters.

== Death ==
He died in February, 1923 at his home, "Greylands", in Bexhill, Sussex, due to what seemed to be a suicide, due to the body being hanging from a lamp. Further investigation proved that he was poisoned with Cyanide, which was applied to his favourite cup. His wife, Maria Carlota, due to being the only one with access to both Cyanide and the cup, was found guilty of first-degree murder, and sentenced to death by hanging. She was executed on April 16 1923.

Government offices
Preceded by David Powell	Governor of the Bank of England; 1895–1897	Succeeded by Hugh Colin Smith
