= Maurice Ponsonby =

English clergyman in South Africa

Dean of Johannesburg
- In office 1923–1930

Personal details
- Born: 10 September 1880 Horsley, Gloucestershire, England
- Died: 27 February 1943 (aged 62) England
- Education: Trinity College, Oxford

Maurice George Jesser Ponsonby, M.C. (10 September 1880 – 27 February 1943) was an English Anglican priest, Dean of Johannesburg from 1923 until 1930.

== Life ==
He was born at Horsley, Gloucestershire, the son of Edwin Charles William Ponsonby and his wife Dora Coope, daughter of Octavius Edward Coope. He was educated at Eton College, and Trinity College, Oxford where he graduated B.A. in 1903, M.A. in 1905; and was ordained deacon in 1904, priest in 1905. After curacies at Hackney Wick and Benenden he was Rector of Pilgrim's Rest from 1912 to 1914. He was Domestic Chaplain to the Archbishop of York from 1914 to 1919; and also a Chaplain to the Forces during the same period. He was Rector of St Mary's Pro-Cathedral, Johannesburg from 1919 to 1923.

After his return from South Africa he was Rector of Much Haddam from 1930 until 1930. His funeral was held at Newtimber on 3 March 1943.

== Works ==
- Visions and Vignettes of War (1917), memoir

== Family ==
Ponsonby married in 1918 Lady Phyllis Buxton, eldest daughter of Sydney Buxton, 1st Earl Buxton. The couple had one son and three daughters who survived to adulthood, with their eldest child Constance Mary Louis Ponsonby (1919–1932). Their son John Ashley Ponsonby of the Coldstream Guards was killed in action in North Africa on 25 December 1942. Of the daughters:

- Elizabeth (born 1922), married in 1952 the barrister John Lionel Clay, later a circuit judge, only son of Lionel Pilleau Clay (died 1918), brother of Charles Travis Clay.
- Mary Veronica (born 1927) married in 1961 the public servant William Peter Ward Barnes (1919–2011), son of Ernest Barnes.
