= Peter Eliot =

English Anglican priest (1910–1995)

Peter Charles Eliot MBE TD (30 October 1910 – 16 December 1995) was an English Anglican priest who served as Archdeacon of Worcester from 1961 to 1975.

Eliot was the great-grandson of Edward Eliot, 3rd Earl of St Germans, by his youngest son, Charles George Cornwallis Eliot. He was educated at Wellington College and Magdalene College, Cambridge. He was commissioned into the Kent Yeomanry and eventually rose to be its commanding officer from 1949 to 1952. Parallel to that time he qualified as a solicitor in 1934, and was a partner in a City of London firm until 1953. In that year he began studying for the priesthood at Westcott House, Cambridge. His first ecclesiastical post was a curacy at St Martin-in-the-Fields. He was vicar of Cockermouth from 1957 to 1961; Rural Dean of Cockermouth and Workington from 1960 to 1961; vicar of Cropthorne from 1961 to 1965; and a residentiary canon at Worcester Cathedral from 1965 to 1975.

He married Lady Althea Buxton, youngest daughter of Sydney Buxton, 1st Earl Buxton and his wife, Mildred Buxton, Countess Buxton.

Church of England titles
Preceded by Thomas Wilson	Archdeacon of Worcester; 1961–1975	Succeeded by John Williams
