= Thomas Wilson (archdeacon of Worcester) =

Thomas Bowstead Wilson (15 August 1882 – 11 October 1961) was Archdeacon of Worcester from 1944 until his death.

Wilson was educated at Charterhouse and Pembroke College, Cambridge and ordained deacon in 1906 and priest in 1907. After a curacy at Wakefield Cathedral he was Missioner of the Pembroke College, Cambridge Mission at Walworth. He held incumbencies in Suckley, Wolverley and Hartlebury before his archdeacon’s appointment.

Church of England titles
Preceded by Charles Ridley Duppuy	Archdeacon of Worcester; 1944–1961	Succeeded by Peter Charles Eliot
