= Honor Smith =

English neurologist (1908-1995)

- Born: Honor Mildred Vivian Smith; 13 November 1908; Chigwell, Essex, England
- Died: 18 January 1995 (aged 86)
- Father: Vivian Smith, 1st Baron Bicester
- Relatives: William McDonnell (maternal grandfather)
- Medical career
- Profession: Neurologist
- Sub-specialties: Tuberculous meningitis

Honor Mildred Vivian Smith (13 November 1908 – 18 January 1995) was an English neurologist who specialised in the treatment of tuberculous meningitis. She worked and taught at the teaching hospitals of the University of Oxford, and was appointed OBE in 1962.

== Early life and education ==
Honor Smith was born in Chigwell, Essex. She was the sixth of seven children born to Vivian Smith, 1st Baron Bicester, and Lady Sybil Mary McDonnell, the daughter of William Randal McDonnell, 6th Earl of Antrim. She had a passion for hunting, inspired by her father, but she decided to pursue a career in medicine, influenced by her mother, instead of becoming master of hounds for the Bicester hunt. She enrolled at the London School of Medicine for Women, where her mother's friend Lady Florence Barrett was dean. She received a BSc in 1937 and graduated from the Royal Free Hospital School of Medicine as MBBS in 1941.

== Career ==
Smith began her medical career at the Elizabeth Garrett Anderson Hospital in London. She then moved to Oxford, where she worked for Herbert Seddon's peripheral nerve injury unit. She began working for Hugh Cairns's neurosurgery unit at the Radcliffe Infirmary in 1943, where she started her lifelong body of research on meningitis. Here, she pioneered the use of intrathecal penicillin to treat pneumococcal meningitis. She undertook a research fellowship at the Boston Children's Hospital with a grant from the Rockefeller Foundation in 1948; she received an MD in the same year after returning to Oxford.

Smith later became a consultant neurologist and established a unit for tuberculous meningitis at Churchill Hospital. She was a reader in medicine at Oxford University from 1954 to 1961, and also became an honorary fellow of St Hugh's College, Oxford. In 1959, she travelled to Morocco at the request of the World Health Organization to investigate an outbreak of paralysis that was discovered to be caused by contamination of cooking oil with orthocresyl phosphate. She was appointed OBE in 1962 for her work on the treatment of tuberculous meningitis and was elected Fellow of the Royal College of Physicians in 1965.

== Later life ==
After retiring in 1971, Smith lived in Herefordshire. She developed heart failure and died in 1995 at the age of 86.
