= Hugh Colin Smith =

English banker (1836-1910)

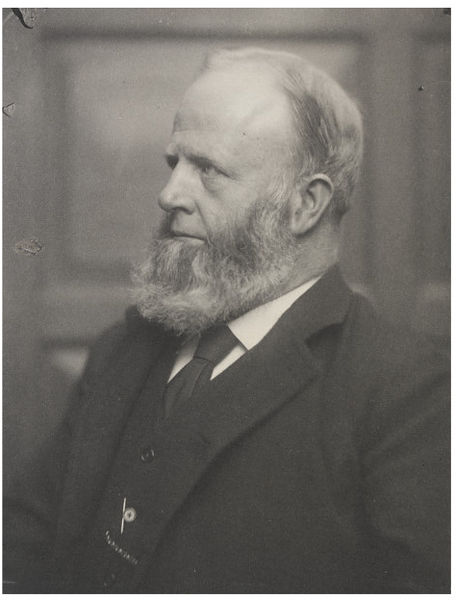
- Photograph of Smith, by Frederick Hollyer, c. 1900

Governor of the Bank of England
- In office 1897–1899
- Preceded by: Albert George Sandeman
- Succeeded by: Samuel Steuart Gladstone

Deputy Governor of the Bank of England
- In office 1895–1897
- Preceded by: Albert George Sandeman
- Succeeded by: Samuel Steuart Gladstone

Personal details
- Born: 31 October 1836 London, England
- Died: 8 March 1910 (aged 73) Mount Clare, Roehampton
- Spouse: Constance Maria Josepha Adeane (after 1865)
- Children: Mildred; Vivian; Aubrey; Olive
- Parent(s): John Abel Smith; Anne Jervoise Smith
- Relatives: John Smith (grandfather)
- Education: Eton College
- Alma mater: Trinity College, Cambridge

Hugh Colin Smith (31 October 1836 – 8 March 1910) was an English banker who was Governor of the Bank of England from 1897–99.

== Early life ==
Smith was born in London, the son of John Abel Smith (1802–1871), Member of Parliament for Chichester and Midhurst, and Anne Jervoise. His younger brother was Dudley Robert Smith. Smith belonged to the wealthy Smith banking family, which was associated with the banking firm Smith, Payne & Smiths. The family’s banking history indicates, however, Hugh Colin Smith himself was not a partner in the London bank.

His paternal grandfather was John Smith, who preceded his father as MP for Midhurst, and his maternal grandfather was Sir Samuel Clarke Jervoise.

He was educated at Eton College and Trinity College, Cambridge.

== Career ==
From 1895 to 1897, he served as the Deputy Governor of the Bank of England, followed by another two-year term as Governor of the Bank of England from 1897 to 1899. In both roles, he succeeded Albert George Sandeman and was himself succeeded by Samuel Steuart Gladstone.

== Personal life ==
On 9 August 1865, Smith was married to Constance Maria Josepha Adeane, the daughter of Henry John Adeane MP and Hon. Matilda Abigail Stanley (a daughter of John Stanley, 1st Baron Stanley of Alderley Park). Together, they were the parents of:

- Mildred Anne Smith (1866–1955), who married the politician Sydney Buxton, 1st Earl Buxton, son of Sir Thomas Buxton, 1st Baronet.
- Vivian Smith, 1st Baron Bicester (1867–1956), a merchant banker who married Lady Sybil Mary McDonnell, daughter of William McDonnell, 6th Earl of Antrim.
- Adm. Sir Aubrey Smith (1872–1957), a British naval officer who married Elizabeth Grosvenor, a daughter of Richard Grosvenor, 1st Baron Stalbridge, and a niece of Hugh Grosvenor, 1st Duke of Westminster.
- Olive Alethea Smith (1880–1964), who married Lt.-Col. the Hon. Guy Baring, a younger son of Alexander Baring, 4th Baron Ashburton, who was an MP and Army officer who was one of twenty-two MPs killed in action in the First World War.

From 1874–1908, he lived at Mount Clare, Roehampton, south west London. His stockbroker descendants lived there until 1945. He was a founding member of Roehampton Cricket Club.

He died at Mount Clare in 1910 after a three-month illness and is buried at St Andrew's Church, Ham.

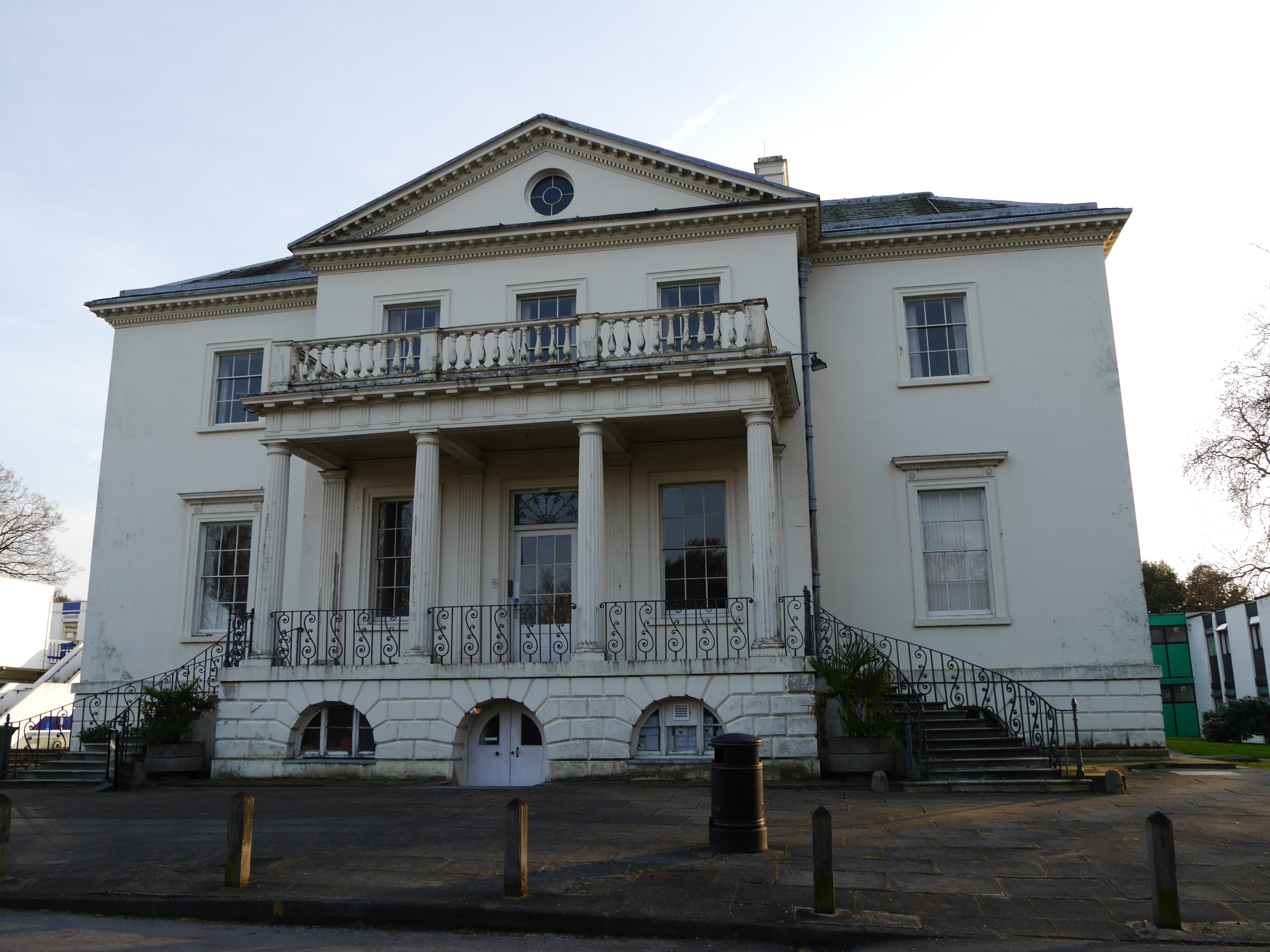
Mount Clare, Roehampton

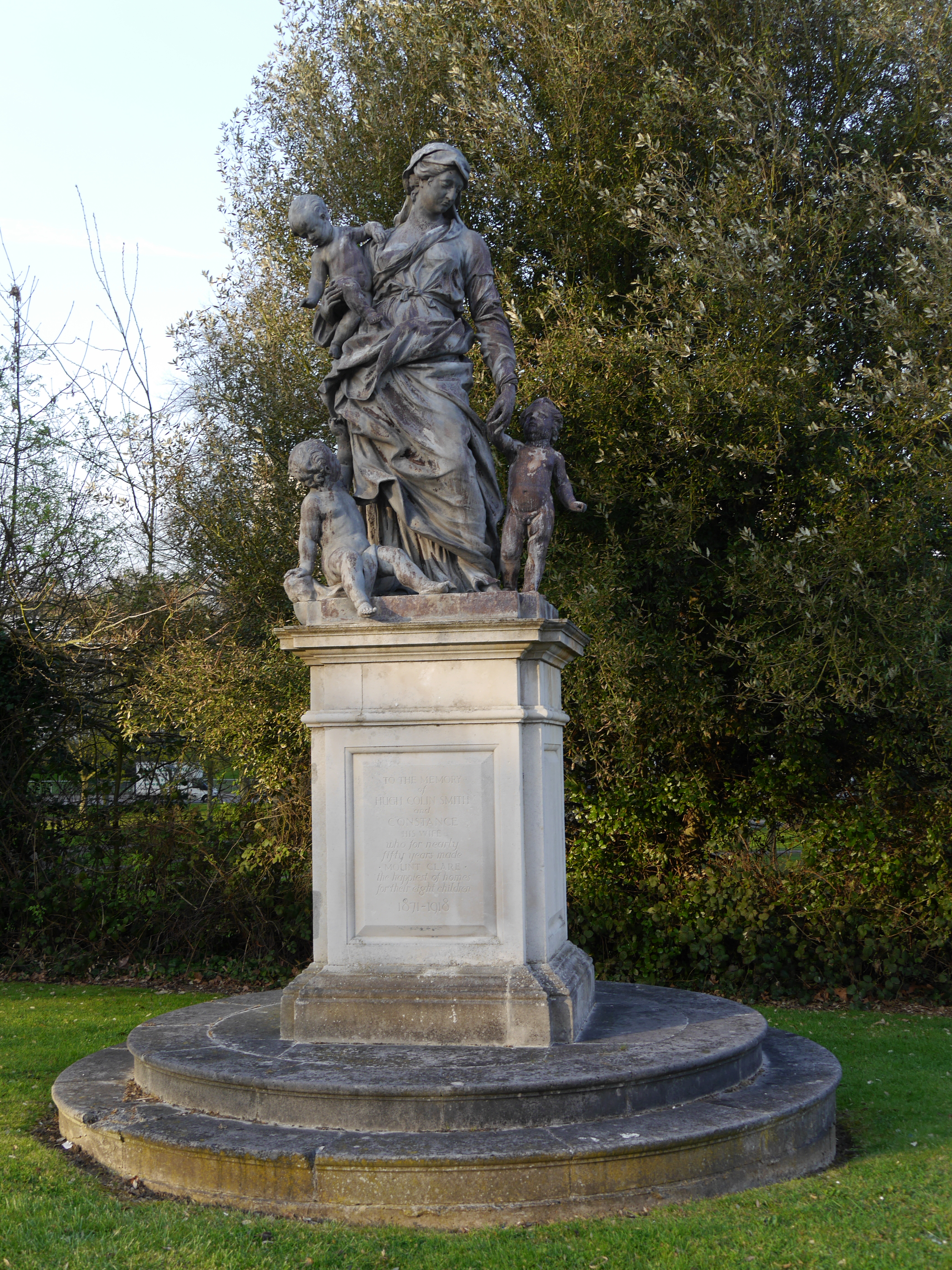
Statue in memory of Hugh Colin Smith, Mount Clare

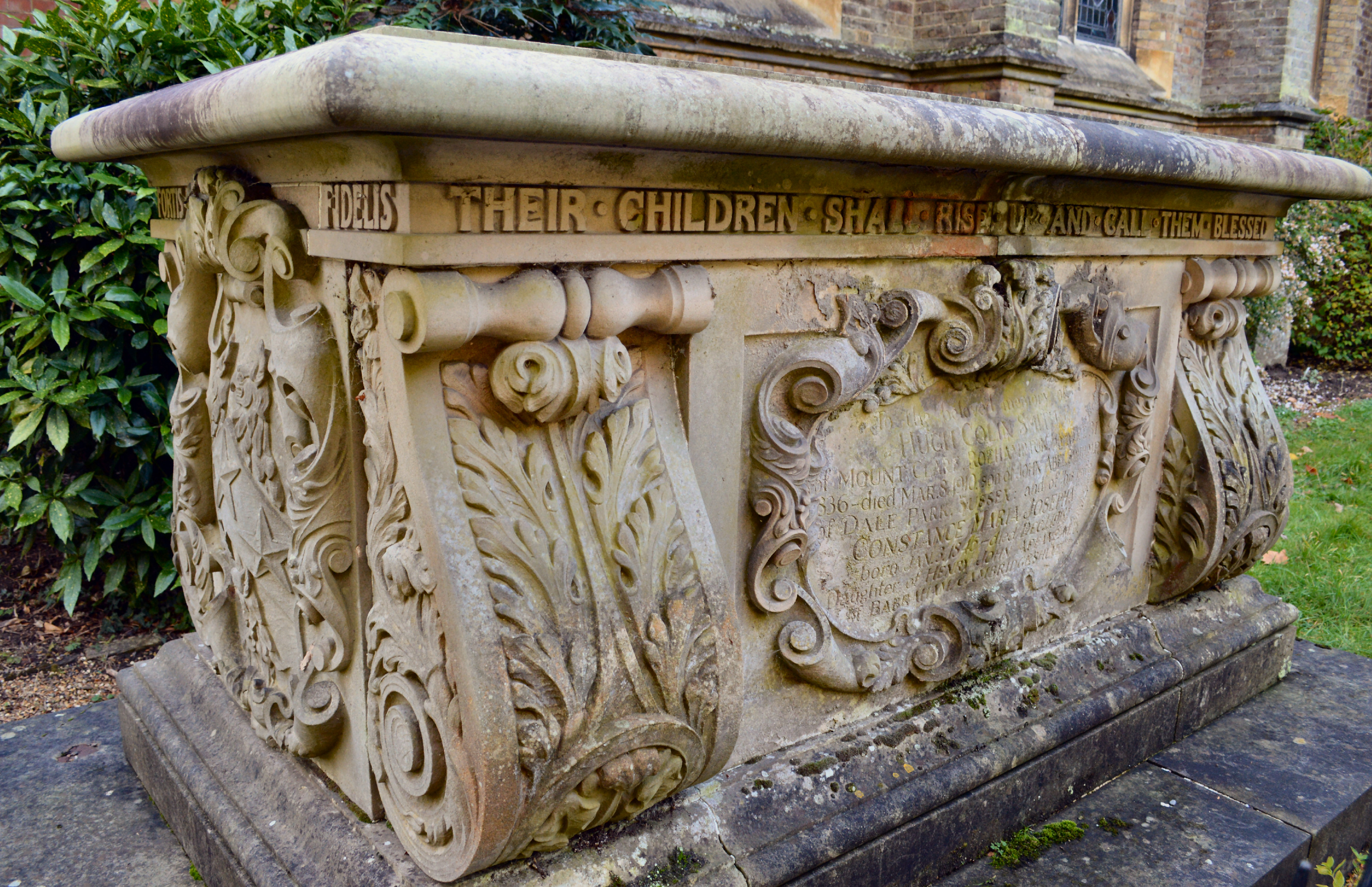
Tomb, Ham Common

=== Descendants ===
Through his daughter Olive, he was a grandfather of six, including the cricketer Giles Baring. Their great grandchildren include the actress Rachel Ward and the actress and environmentalist Tracy Worcester.

Government offices
Preceded by Albert George Sandeman	Governor of the Bank of England; 1897–1899	Succeeded by Samuel Steuart Gladstone
Preceded by Albert George Sandeman	Deputy Governor of the Bank of England; 1895–1897	Succeeded by Samuel Steuart Gladstone
