= Mount Clare, Roehampton =

Coordinates: 51.4519°N 0.2509°W

Mount Clare
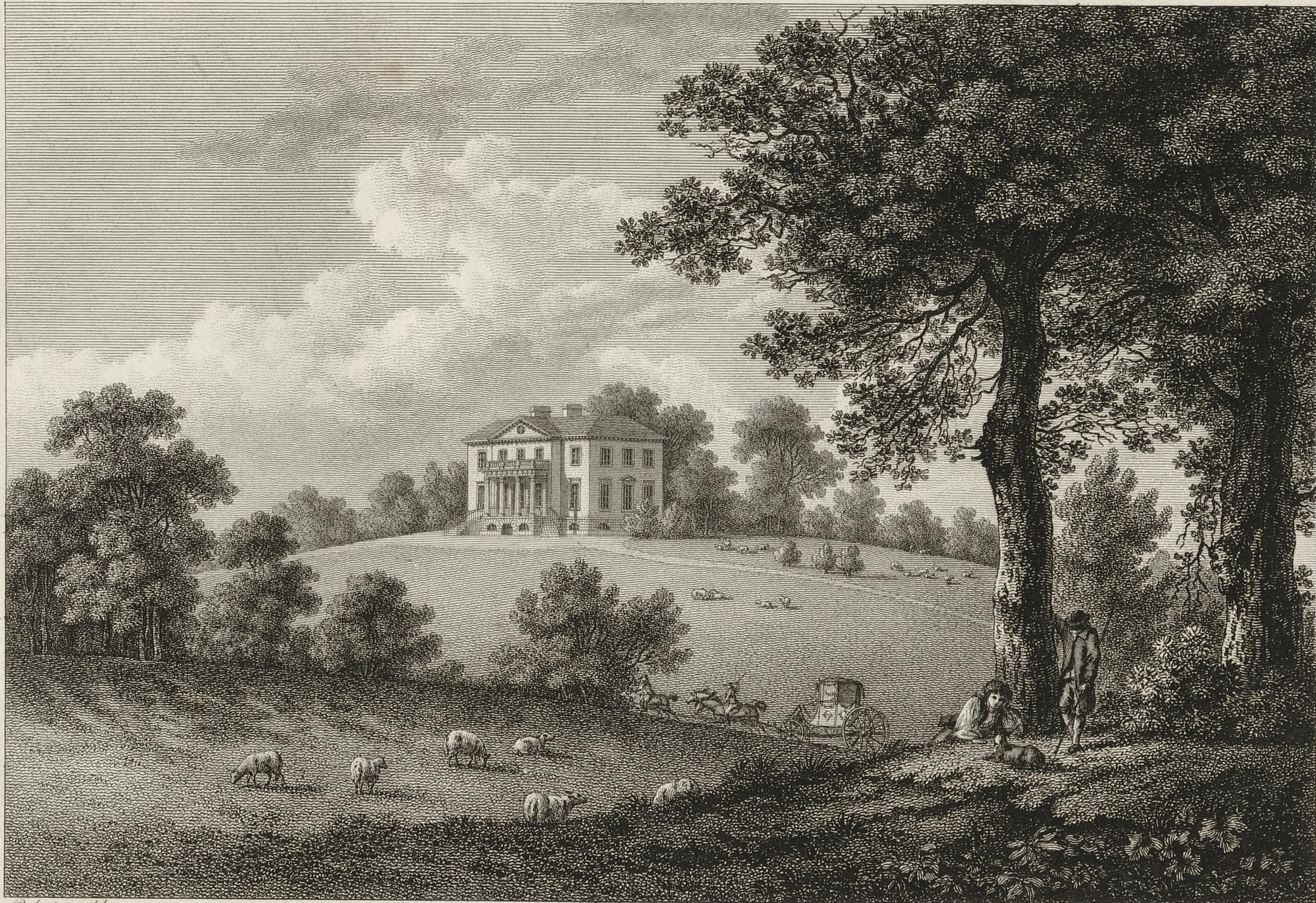
- Mount Clare in an engraving from 1779 by William Watts

Listed Building – Grade I
- Official name: Mount Clare, Minstead Gardens, SW15
- Designated: 14 July 1955
- Reference no.: 1184436

Mount Clare is a Grade I listed house built in 1772 in Minstead Gardens, Roehampton, in the London Borough of Wandsworth.

The architect was Sir Robert Taylor, and the house was enlarged with a portico and other enrichments in 1780 by Placido Columbani. It was Grade I listed on 14 July 1955.

The house was built for the politician George Clive and the gardens were landscaped by Lancelot "Capability" Brown.

== Notable residents ==
Clive died in 1779. Subsequent residents have included:

- 1780–1804: Sir John Dick, British Consul at Leghorn, who died at the house on 2 December 1804
- 1807–1819: the chemist Charles Hatchett FRS, who discovered the element niobium
- 1830–1832: Humphrey St John-Mildmay, sixth son of the third Baronet, and Member of Parliament for Southampton
- 1840–1846: Admiral of the Fleet Sir Charles Ogle, 2nd Baronet
- 1874–1908: Hugh Colin Smith, Governor of the Bank of England. Smith's stockbroker descendants lived in the house until 1945.

== Requisition in 1945 and subsequent use ==
The house was requisitioned by Wandsworth Borough Council in 1945. In 1963 it became a hall of residence for Garnett College, the UK's only dedicated lecturer-training college. Garnett College became part of Woolwich Polytechnic, then Thames Polytechnic, then the University of Greenwich.

Mount Clare was owned by the Southlands Methodist Trust and used as a hall of residence for the University of Roehampton. Since 2024, Mount Clare has been owned by developers AKA Capability LLP, with attempts made to turn the property into accommodation for the homeless.

== Gallery ==
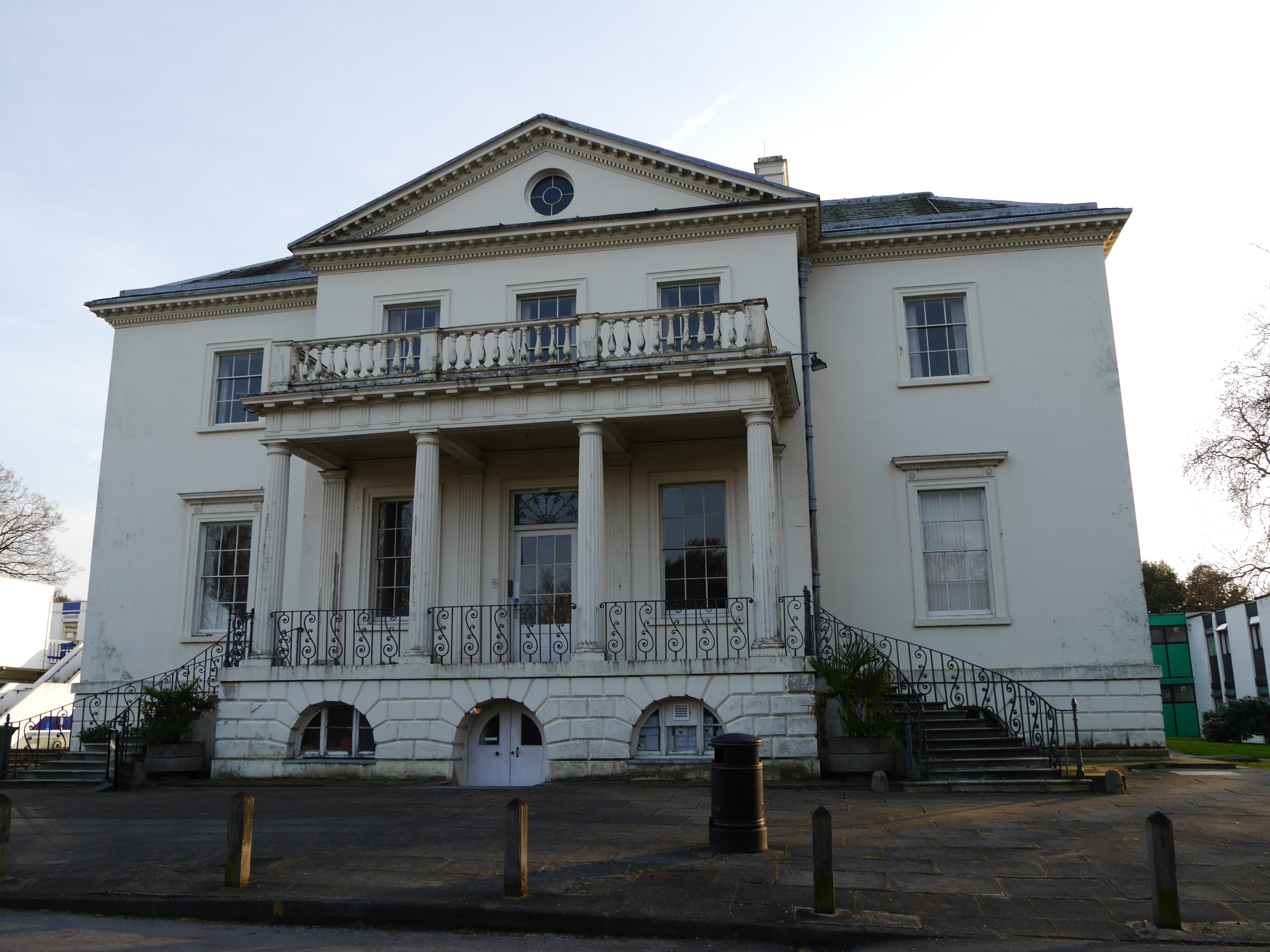
Mount Clare, front view

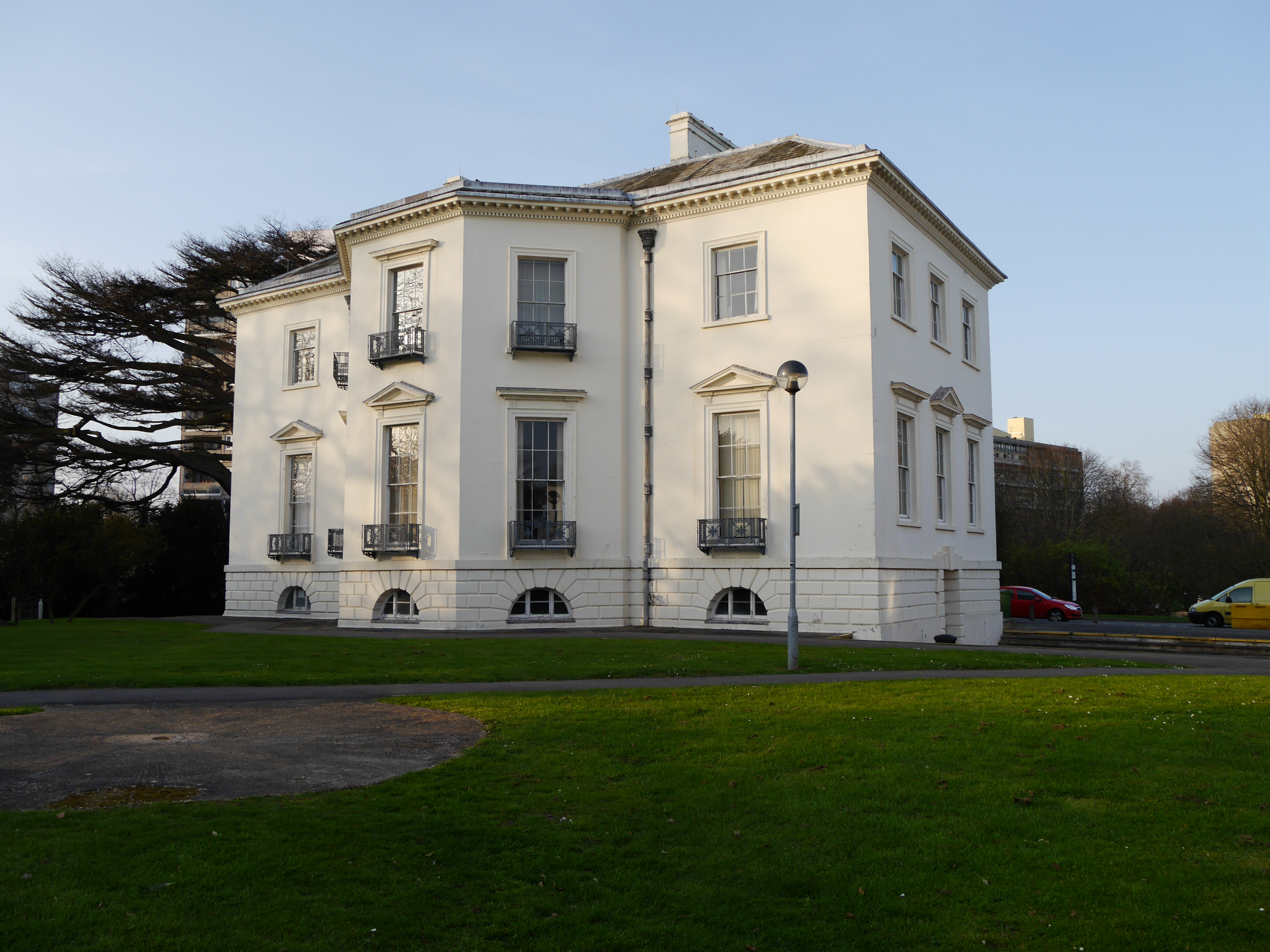
Mount Clare, rear view

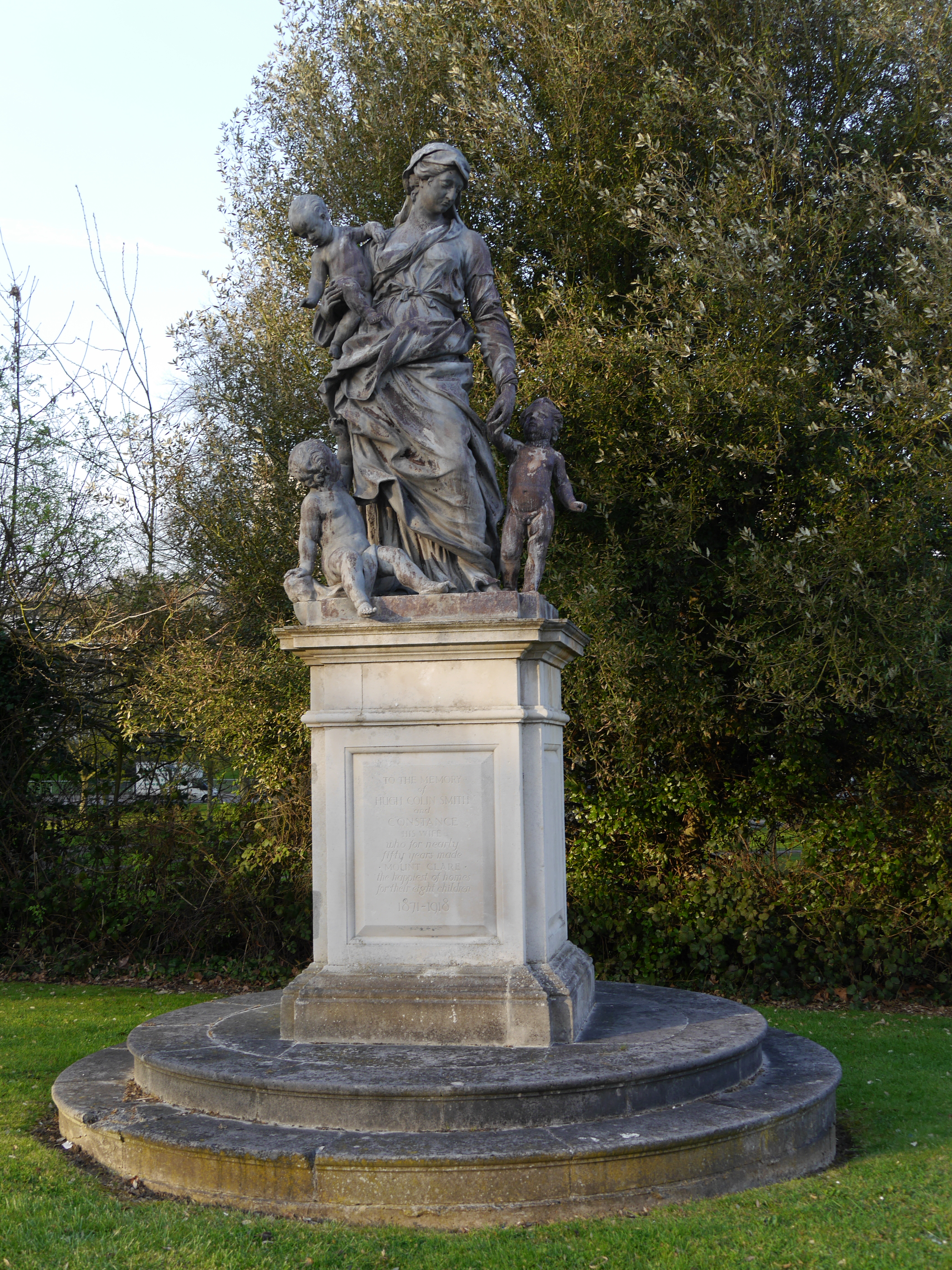
Statue in memory of Hugh Colin Smith, Mount Clare
