= Placido Columbani =

Italian architectural designer

Placido Columbani was an Italian architectural designer who worked chiefly in England in the latter part of the 18th century. He belonged to the school of the Adams and Pergolesi, and like them frequently designed the enrichments of furniture. He was a prolific producer of chimney-pieces, which are often mistaken for Adam work, of moulded friezes, and painted plaques for cabinets and the like.

English furniture designers of the end of the 18th century, such as the Adams, Hepplewhite and Sheraton, were influenced by his graceful, flowing and classical conceptions. His books are still a valuable store-house of sketches for internal architectural decoration.

== Published works ==
His principal works are:

- Vases and Tripods (1770)
- A New Book of Ornaments, containing a variety of elegant designs for Modern Panels, commonly executed in Stucco, Wood or Painting, and used in decorating Principal Rooms
- A variety of Capitals, Friezes and Cornickes, and how to increase and decrease them, still retaining their proportions (1776)

He also assisted John Crunden in the production of The Chimneypiece Maker's Daily Assistant (1766).
