= Aubrey Smith (Royal Navy officer) =

Royal Navy Admiral (1872-1957)

Admiral Sir Aubrey Smith KCVO KBE CB
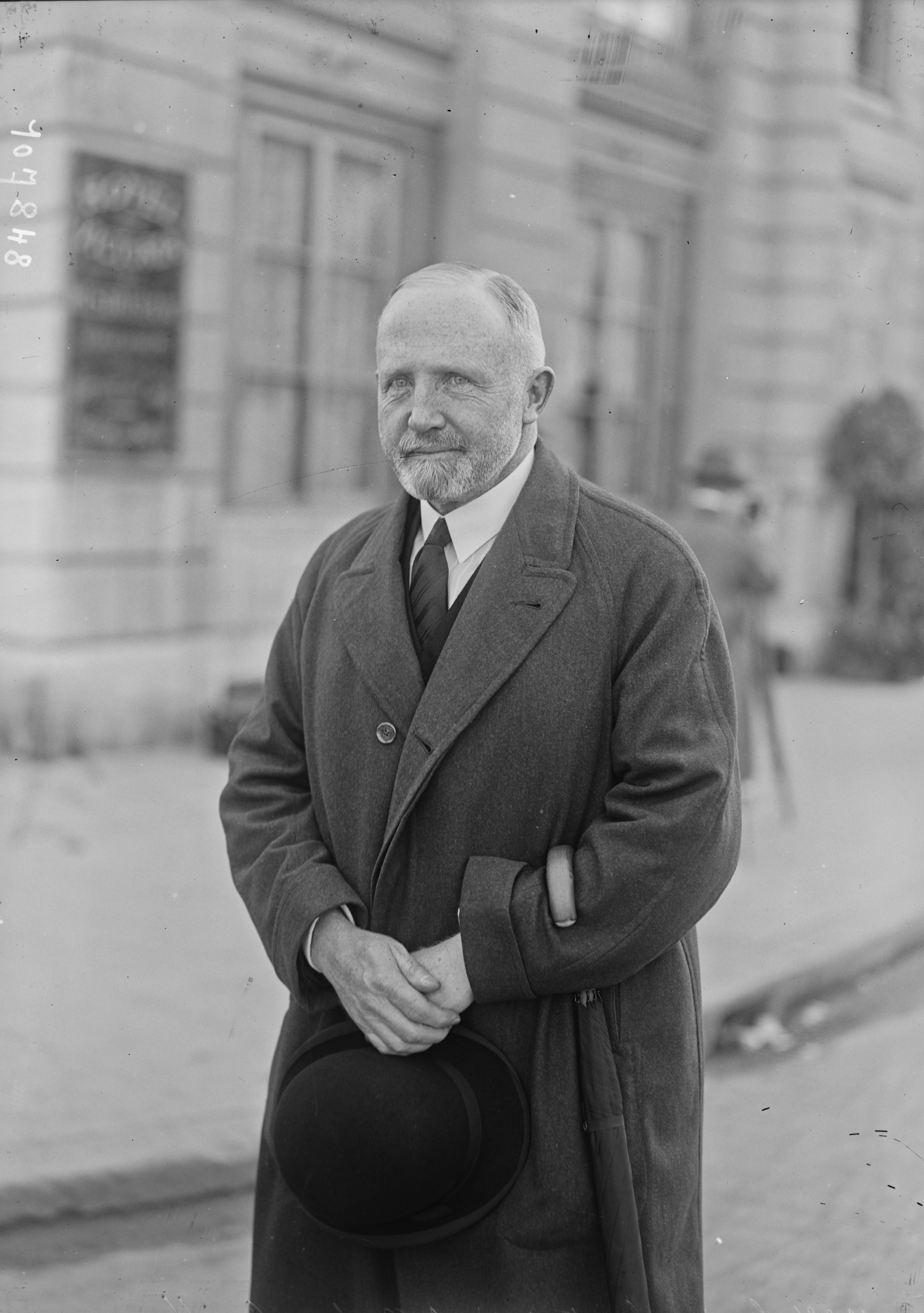
- Smith in Geneva, 1926
- Born: 22 September 1872
- Died: 6 October 1957 (aged 85)
- Spouse: Hon. Elizabeth Emma Beatrice Grosvenor
- Parents: Hugh Colin Smith (father); Constance Maria Josepha Adeane (mother)
- Military career
- Allegiance: United Kingdom
- Branch: Royal Navy
- Service years: 1885–1927
- Rank: Admiral
- Commands: HMS Cumberland, HMS Drake, HMS Newcastle, HMS Ramillies
- Conflicts: First World War, Greco-Turkish War
- Awards: KCVO, KBE CB

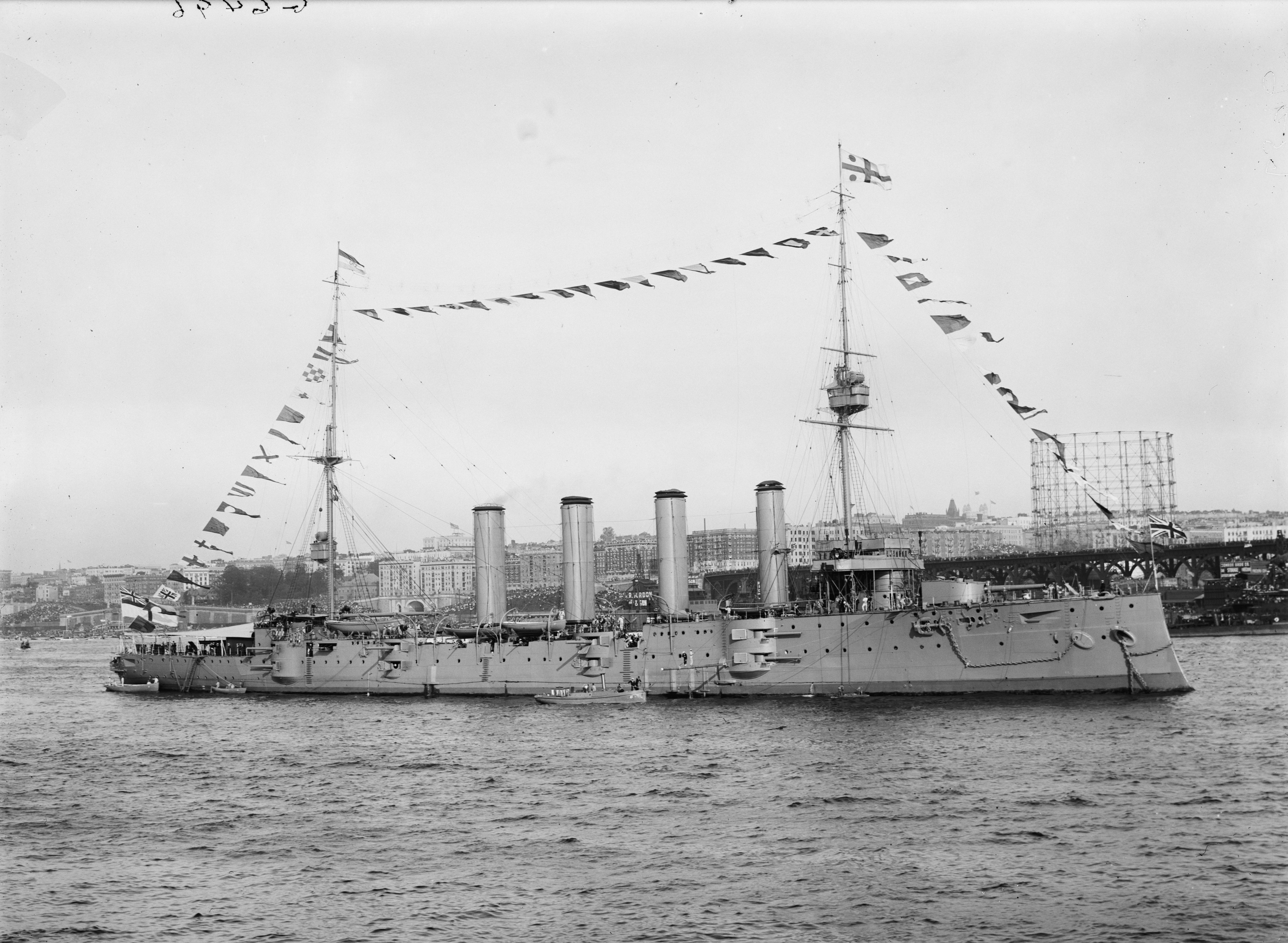
HMS Drake

Admiral Sir Aubrey Clare Hugh Smith KCVO KBE CB (22 September 1872 – 6 October 1957) was a Royal Navy officer who saw active service in the First World War and the Greco-Turkish War. In the mid-1920s he was Naval Representative to the League of Nations.

== Early life and career ==
The son of Hugh Colin Smith (1836–1910), who later became Governor of the Bank of England, by his marriage to Constance Maria Josepha Adeane, and the grandson of John Abel Smith (1802–1871), a banker and member of parliament, the young Smith joined the Royal Navy in 1885 as a midshipman, at the age of thirteen. His older brother was Vivian Smith, who the same year left Eton and went up to Cambridge.

In 1893 Smith was promoted lieutenant. On 1 June 1899, he married Elizabeth Emma Beatrice Grosvenor, a daughter of Richard Grosvenor, 1st Baron Stalbridge, and a niece of Hugh Grosvenor, 1st Duke of Westminster. From 1908 to 1911 he was Naval Attaché at Saint Petersburg. While there, in 1909 he was appointed a Member of the Royal Victorian Order and in 1910 was promoted captain.

On 1 May 1912, Smith took command of the armoured cruiser HMS Cumberland and from July 1914 commanded the armoured cruiser Drake. In October 1914, his ship was sent to bring Russian gold worth eight million pounds to Britain; on arrival, Drake lay thirty miles off Archangel, and the gold was brought to her at night. However, the operation was known to the Germans. In October 1915, the ship was refitted and transferred to the North America and West Indies Station for convoy duties.

In November 1916 Smith was transferred to command the light cruiser Newcastle. In 1917 his new ship was posted to the East Indies Station, and in 1918 she was moved to duties off South America.

After the end of the Great War, on 9 April 1920 Smith took command of the dreadnought HMS Ramillies and was also appointed as a naval aide-de-camp to King George V. Ramillies took part in the Greek Summer Offensive of 1920 and in June was one of the British ships which bombarded Turkish Nationalist troops of Mustafa Kemal on the Ismid peninsula in the Sea of Marmora, following an attack by Kemal's forces on a British outpost. She then assisted with convoying Greek transports.

Smith was promoted Rear Admiral in 1921 and Vice-Admiral in 1926. He headed a British naval mission to Greece from 1921 to 1923, during the continuation of the Greek and Turkish War, and then served as Admiralty Representative to the League of Nations from 1923 to 1927.

With his wife Smith had one son and one daughter.

== Honours ==
- Member of the Royal Victorian Order, 1909
- Companion of the Order of the Bath, 1921
- Distinguished Service Medal (USA), 1921
- Knight Commander of the Order of the British Empire, 1928 Birthday Honours
- Knight Commander of the Royal Victorian Order, 1947

== Retirement ==
In retirement, Smith lived at Iden Cottage, Iden, near Rye, Sussex. In July 1939, he hosted a dinner party at his house in Gloucester Place, Marylebone, at which Count Gerhard von Schwerin, an officer of the German War Ministry's intelligence section, met James Stuart, representing the government, Admiral John Godfrey, head of naval intelligence, and General Sir James Marshall-Cornwall, director general of air and coastal defence, to warn them of Hitler's intention to attack Poland. Schwerin, who had been sent by a former Chief of the German General Staff, urged that Chamberlain should be replaced as prime minister by Churchill, that a squadron of Royal Navy battleships should be sent to the Baltic, and that Royal Air Force bombers should be stationed in France. These suggestions were passed to Chamberlain, who considered them "provocative". The Foreign Office commented that the German Army seemed to want the British to save them from the Nazis.

When Smith died on 6 October 1957 he was still living at Iden Cottage and left an estate valued at £29,998.
