= Sir George Smith, 1st Baronet =

Arms of Smith: "Or, a chevron cotised sable between three demi-griffins couped of the last the two in chief respecting each other", as is visible on the monument to Sir George Smith, 1st Baronet, in St Oswald's Church, East Stoke.

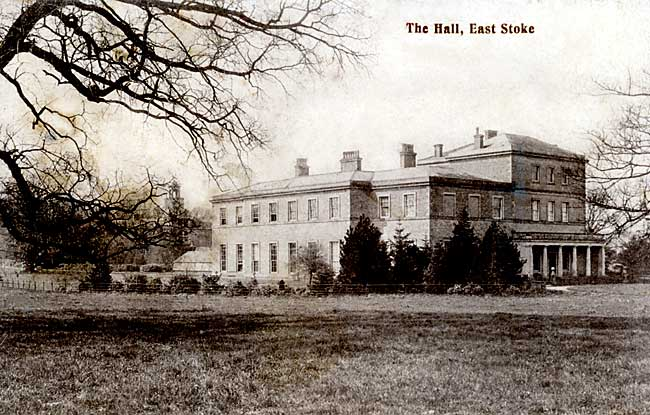
Stoke Hall, East Stoke, Nottinghamshire, country seat of Sir George Smith, 1st Baronet, later enlarged in 1812

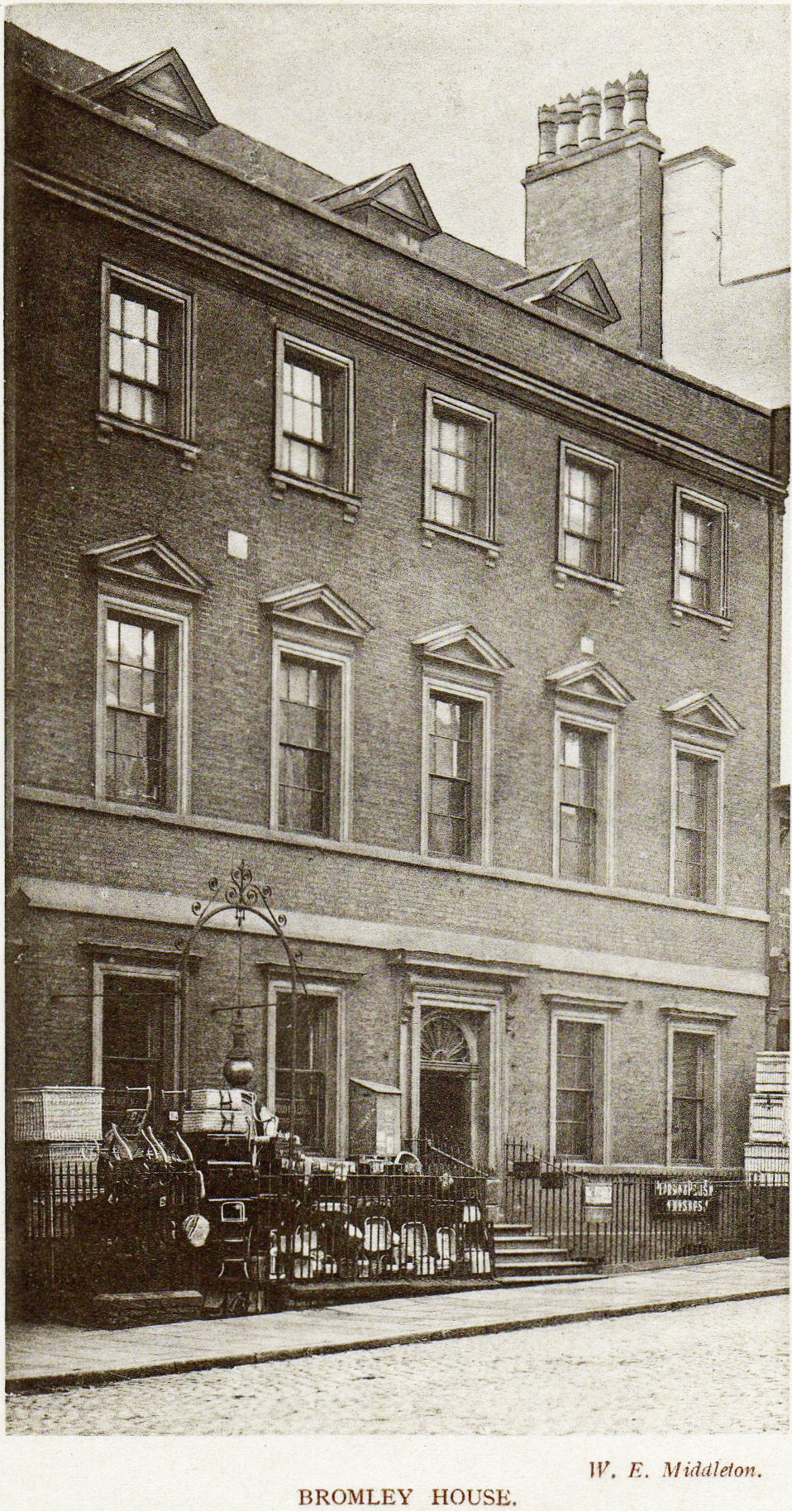
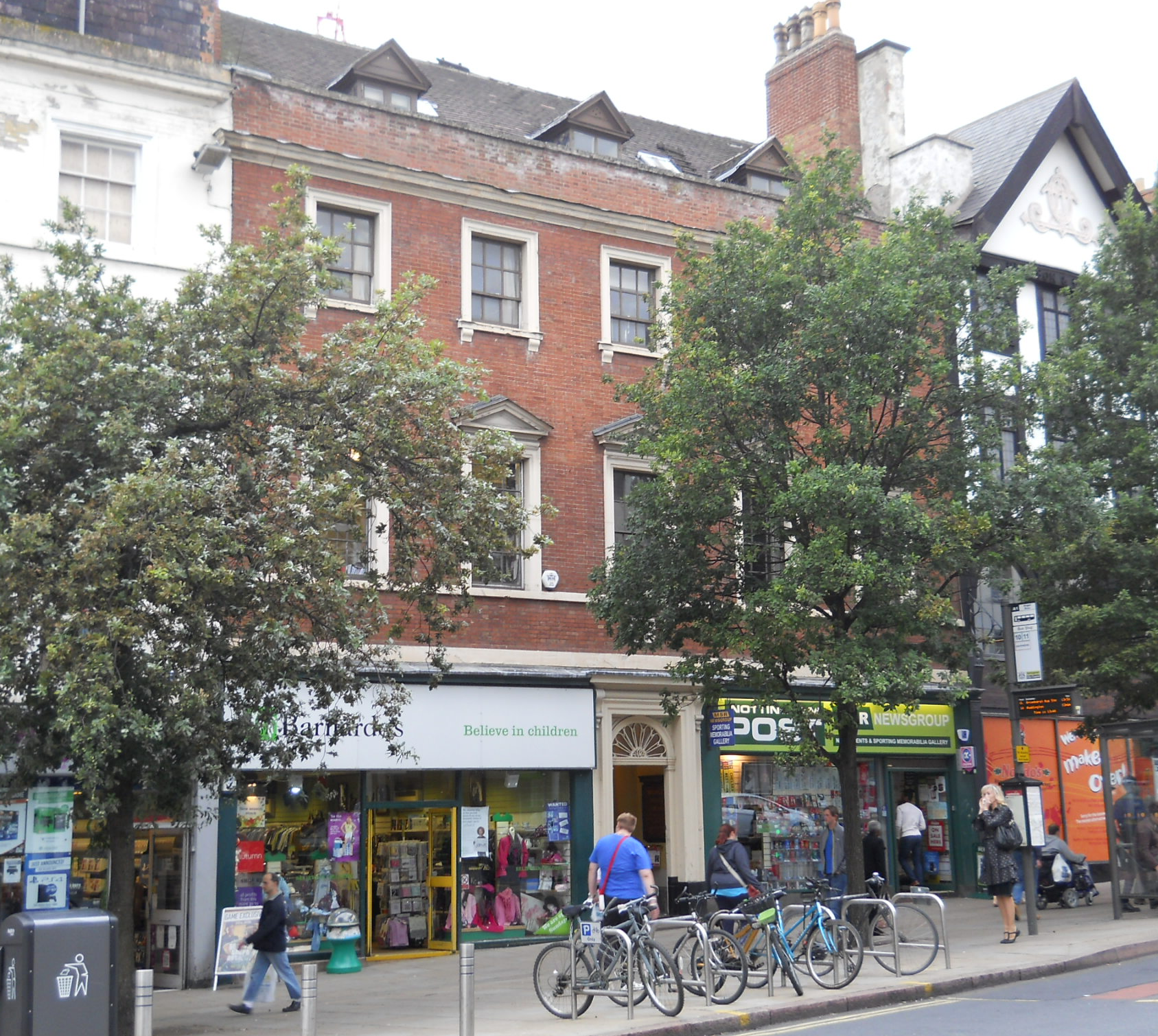
Smith House, Angel Row, Nottingham, in 1916 and 2013, town house and office built by Sir George Smith, 1st Baronet. Called by his son "Bromley House" and later used as Nottingham Subscription Library. Said to have been "the best built house in town"

Sir George Smith, 1st Baronet (1714–1769), of Smith House (later "Bromley House"), Angel Row, Nottingham, and of Stoke Hall in the parish of East Stoke in Nottinghamshire, was a member of the Smith family of bankers, who established Smith's Bank in Nottingham in 1658. He was created a baronet "of East Stoke in the County of Nottingham", a title in the Baronetage of Great Britain, on 31 October 1757.

== Origins ==
He was the eldest son of Abel Smith I (1686–1756) of Nottingham, the 2nd son of Thomas Smith I (1631–1699), the founder of Smith's Bank in Nottingham. His younger brothers included: Abel Smith II (1717–1788) (father of Robert Smith, 1st Baron Carrington, and of John Smith (1767–1842) of Blendon Hall, great-grandfather of Vivian Smith, 1st Baron Bicester (1867–1956)) and John Smith (born 1716), ancestor of Julian Pauncefote, 1st Baron Pauncefote (1828–1902).

His mother was Jane Beaumont (1689–1743), a daughter of George Beaumont of Chapelthorpe in Yorkshire.

== Marriages and issue ==
He married twice:

- Firstly to Mary Howe (1726–1761), daughter and sole heiress of Major William Howe (1699–1733) by his wife Elizabeth Pauncefote, one of the two daughters and co-heiresses of William Pauncefote (died 1711) of Carswalls in Newent, and of Preston, near Dymock, both in Gloucestershire. Elizabeth's sister and co-heiress Sarah Pauncefote was the wife of William Bromley (died 1769) of Abberley Hall near Stourport-on-Severn in Worcestershire. His father-in-law Major William Howe was the son of Lieutenant-General Emanuel Howe (c. 1663 – 1709; the fourth son of John Grobham Howe (1625–1679) of Langar Hall in Nottinghamshire, the younger son of Sir John Howe, 1st Baronet) by his wife Ruperta, the illegitimate daughter of Prince Rupert of the Rhine, grandson of King James I. By his first wife he had issue, of whom only one survived:

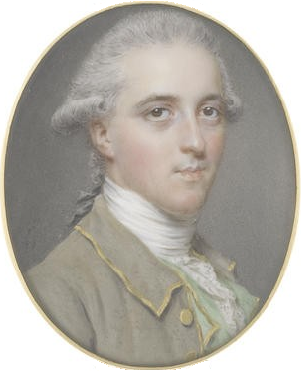
Sir George Pauncefote-Bromley, 2nd Baronet (1753–1808), 1780 miniature by John Smart

  - Sir George Pauncefote-Bromley, 2nd Baronet (1753–1808), High Sheriff of Gloucestershire in 1775. In 1778 he assumed by royal licence the surname and arms of Bromley in lieu of his patronymic and in 1803 he assumed by royal licence the surname of Pauncefote in addition to that of Bromley, having inherited or purchased the outstanding moieties of his maternal estates of Carswalls and Preston from his mother's childless first-cousin Robert Bromley (died 1803) of Abberley. Robert Bromley (died 1803) thus disposed of his maternal estates to the descendant of his mother's sister, but his paternal estate of Abberley he bequeathed to his illegitimate kinsman Col. Henry Bromley (c. 1803 – 1836), a Member of Parliament for Worcester 1806–07, illegitimate son of a certain William Bromley. In 1778 he married Esther Curzon, a daughter of Assheton Curzon, 1st Viscount Curzon (1730–1820), of Hagley Hall in Staffordshire, who brought with her a large dowry. However, by 1782 it had become clear to his wife that he was homosexual: Lady Bromley "observed an increasing impertinent familiar behaviour of Sr George Bromley to his male servants, but inspecting (suspecting) as she was of the cause, it past on for some time until his conduct discovered evident proof to her of a strong propensity to the vice of sodomitical practices he separated himself from her bed grew less attentive and soon almost entirely alienated his affections, if he ever entertained any, for her, and directed all his thoughts and actions to his favourite male servants spending the whole of his time with them in his study or in amusements under the pretences of fishing and having one constantly to sleep in the same room with him". Following the complaint of one of his male servants, he was tried at Nottingham Assizes in 1791 and was convicted for assault and attempted sodomy and was jailed for 2 years, and was divorced by his wife. By his wife he had a son and heir:
    - Admiral Sir Robert Howe Bromley, 3rd Baronet (1778–1857)
- Secondly in 1768 he married Catherine Vyse (died 1786), a daughter of William Vyse of Lichfield, Archdeacon of Salop.

== Monument at East Stoke ==
His mural monument survives in St Oswald's Church, East Stoke, displaying the arms of Smith ("Or, a chevron cotised sable between three demi-griffins couped of the last the two in chief respecting each other"), with an inescutcheon of pretence of Howe ("Or, a fess between three wolf's heads couped sable" of four quarters) impaling Vyse ("Argent, a buck's head cabossed sable between the attires a cross of the last"). It is inscribed as follows:

"Sacred to the memory of Sir George Smith Bar^{t} of Nottingham and of Stoke Hall who died Sep^{t} 5th 1769 aged 55. And of Mary his first wife daughter and sole heiress of William Howe Esq^{r} who died May 18th 1761 aged 35, by whom he had issue: Howe, born June 26th 1749; May, born May 3d 1751; Jane, born July 27th 1760, who all died in their infancy and lie interr'd in the vault underneath this monument with their father and mother. George (their only surviving child) caused this monument to be erected as a testimony of his affectionate regard for his deceased parents."

Baronetage of Great Britain
New creation	Baronet of East Stoke; 1757–1769	Succeeded by George Pauncefote-Bromley
