= Julian Pauncefote, 1st Baron Pauncefote =

British barrister, judge and diplomat (1828–1902)

The Right Honourable The Lord Pauncefote GCB GCMG PC
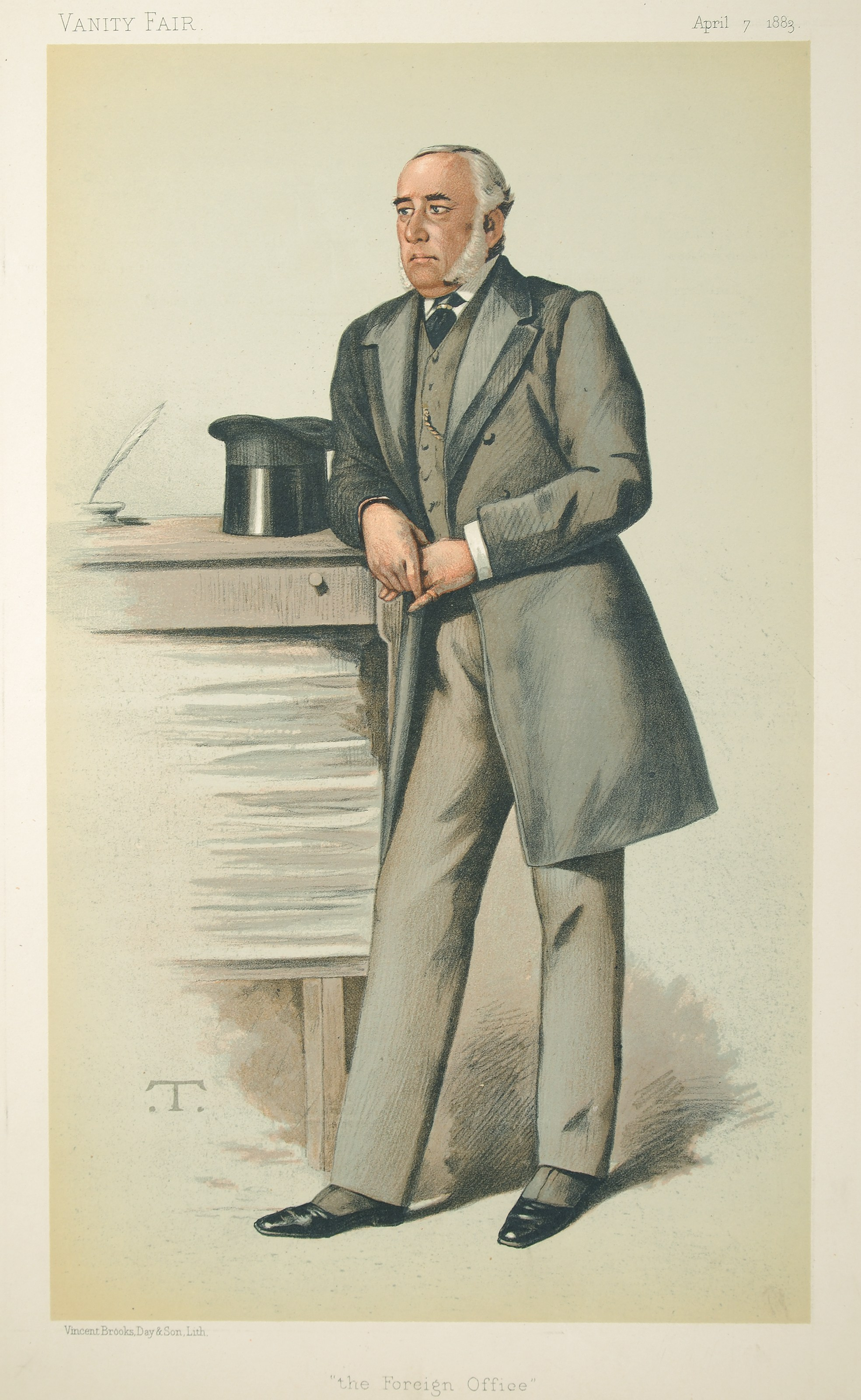
- Caricature by Spy published in Vanity Fair in 1883.

British Ambassador to the United States
- In office 20 March 1893 – 24 May 1902
- Monarchs: Queen Victoria; Edward VII
- Preceded by: New office
- Succeeded by: Sir Michael Henry Herbert

Envoy Extraordinary and Minister Plenipotentiary to the United States
- In office 1889–1893
- Monarch: Queen Victoria
- Preceded by: Sir Lionel Sackville-West
- Succeeded by: Upgraded to Ambassador to the United States

Personal details
- Born: 13 September 1828 Munich, Bavaria
- Died: 24 May 1902 (aged 73) Washington D. C., United States
- Spouse: Selina Cubitt

Julian Pauncefote, 1st Baron Pauncefote GCB GCMG PC (13 September 1828 – 24 May 1902), known as Sir Julian Pauncefote between 1874 and 1899, was a British barrister, judge and diplomat. He was Permanent Under-Secretary of State for Foreign Affairs between 1882 and 1889 when he was appointed Envoy Extraordinary and Minister Plenipotentiary to the United States and would be the last to use that title, as the office was upgraded to that of Ambassador to the United States in March 1893. Elevated to the peerage as Baron Pauncefote in 1899, he died in office in 1902.

== Origins ==
Descended in the male line from the prominent Smith family of bankers, who established Smith's Bank in Nottingham in 1658, he was born in Munich, Bavaria, the son of Robert "Pauncefote" (born "Robert Smith") by his wife Emma Smith, a daughter of the painter John Raphael Smith (no apparent relation to the Smith bankers). His father (who in 1809 assumed the surname of "Pauncefote" in lieu of his patronymic) was the grandson of John Smith (born 1716), next younger brother of Sir George Smith, 1st Baronet (1714–1769) of Stoke Hall, East Stoke in Nottinghamshire (whose first wife Mary Howe was a co-heiress of the Pauncefote family of Preston, near Dymock, in Gloucestershire), and elder brother of Abel Smith II (1717–1788), ancestor of the Barons Carrington and the Barons Bicester.

== Legal career ==
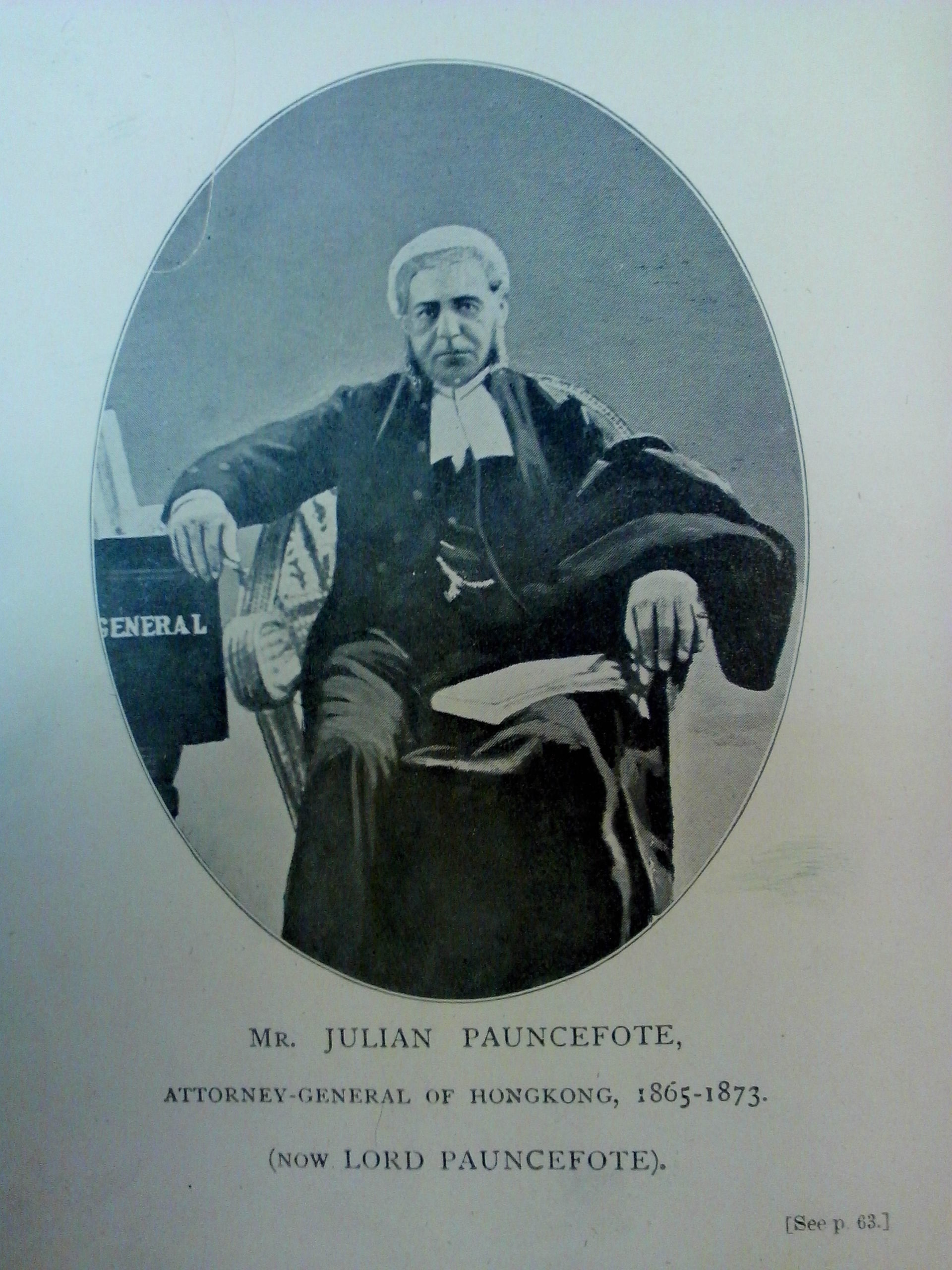
Julian Pauncefote as Attorney-General of Hong Kong

He was educated at Paris, Geneva, and Marlborough College. Intending to join the British Indian Army, he obtained a commission in the Madras Light Cavalry, but never took up his post, instead being called to the bar in 1852, after which he practiced as a conveyancing barrister. In July 1855, Pauncefote briefly became private secretary to Sir William Molesworth, Secretary of State for the Colonies at the time. His appointment lasted only a short period ending with Molesworth's death in October that same year.

In 1862, facing crippling financial losses, Pauncefote decided to go and practise as a barrister in Hong Kong. In 1865 he was appointed acting Attorney General and in 1866 became the Attorney General of Hong Kong. Ex officio he served as acting Chief Justice and acting Puisne Judge on a number of occasions.

In Hong Kong, Pauncefote was involved in a major case involving the rights of enslaved coolies to free themselves. He ended up being sued for false imprisonment in the Supreme Court of Hong Kong. In 1871, Kwok A Sing, a coolie on board a French ship, the Nouvelle Penelope, which had sailed from Macau, killed the master and took over the ship. Kwok was arrested in Hong Kong to be extradited to China. Kwok made a habeas corpus application seeking his release. Chief Justice John Jackson Smale ordered his release on the basis that Kwok was entitled to take any necessary steps to secure his freedom. Pauncefote, as Attorney General of Hong Kong, then had Kwok re-arrested to be tried for piracy. Smale again ordered Kwok's release on the basis the second arrest breached the first habeas corpus order. Kwok then sued Pauncefote for damages for false imprisonment under the Habeas Corpus Act. Kwok almost won, with the British jury finding 4–3 in Kwok's favour. Because a majority of five was needed to find in Kwok's favour the verdict was treated as a verdict for Pauncefote. In 1874, Pauncefote was appointed Chief Justice of the Leeward Islands and was knighted.

== Diplomatic career ==
In 1876, Pauncefote returned to London as Assistant Permanent Under-Secretary of State for the Colonies. He soon transferred to the Foreign Office where he took over the same post at the Foreign Office in 1876. Having been made Knight Commander of the Order of St Michael and St George (KCMG) in 1879 and a Companion of the Order of the Bath (CB) the following year, Pauncefote was promoted Permanent Under-Secretary of State for Foreign Affairs in 1882. He was appointed first British delegate to the Suez Canal Conference in Paris in 1885, and was rewarded for his services in this respect with appointment as a Knight Grand Cross of the Order of St Michael and St George (GCMG). In 1888, he became a Knight Commander of the Order of the Bath (KCB), and the following year was sent to the United States as Envoy Extraordinary and Minister Plenipotentiary. His position was elevated in 1893 to Ambassador, and it made him the Dean of the Diplomatic Corps because Ambassador is superior to all other Envoys dispatched by other countries. He and American secretary of state Richard Olney in January 1897 negotiated an arbitration treaty, but the U.S. Senate, jealous of its prerogatives, refused to ratify it.

He was Britain's representative at negotiations and signatory of the Tripartite Convention in 1899 that partitioned the Samoan islands. In 1901 he negotiated the Hay–Pauncefote Treaty (with American Secretary of State John Hay), nullifying the Clayton–Bulwer Treaty of 1850, and giving the United States the right to create and control a canal across Central America.

Having finally become a Knight Grand Cross of the Order of the Bath (GCB) in 1892, Pauncefote the following year became the first British Ambassador to the United States. He was sworn of the Privy Council in 1894 and raised to the peerage as Baron Pauncefote, "of Preston, Dymock in the County of Gloucester", in 1899. Preston Hall, near Dymock, in Gloucestershire, was a former seat of the Pauncefote family.

== Marriage and issue ==
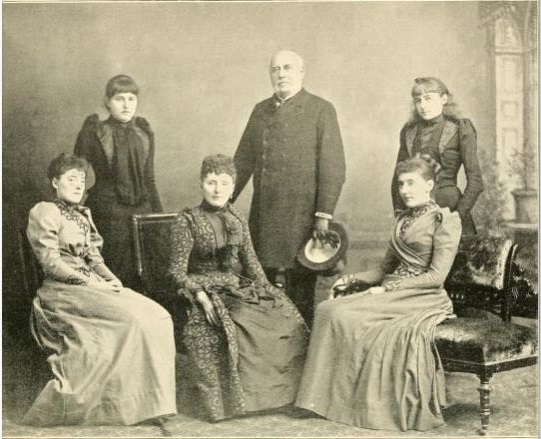
Julian Pauncefote, 1st Baron Pauncefote, with his wife Selina Cubitt, and daughters

In 1859 he married Selina Cubitt, a daughter of William Cubitt, by whom he had one son, who died as an infant, and four daughters, including:

- Lilian Pauncefote (1875–1963), youngest daughter, who on 24 February 1900 married her distant kinsman Sir Robert Bromley, 6th Baronet (1874–1906) of Stoke Hall, East Stoke in Nottinghamshire (descended in the male line from Sir George Smith, 1st Baronet (1714–1769)), honorary attaché to the British embassy in Washington. The wedding at St John's Episcopal Church in Washington DC was officiated by the Bishop of Washington, in the presence of cabinet members, diplomats and other distinguished guests. Lavish gifts were provided by the Rothschilds, the Vanderbilts, Andrew Carnegie and Mr Choate.

== Death ==
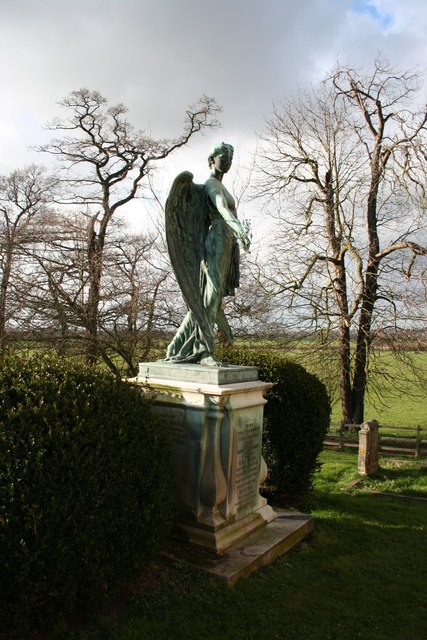
Pauncefote memorial in the churchyard of East Stoke in Nottinghamshire, parish church of the Bromley Baronets of Stoke Hall, into which family his daughter had married

Lord Pauncefote died in office at the British Embassy in Washington, D.C. in May 1902, aged 73. His formal state funeral took place at St John's Episcopal Church in Washington, where his daughter had been married. His remains were transferred back to the United Kingdom in the USS Brooklyn, and were buried in the churchyard of St Oswald's Church, East Stoke in Nottinghamshire on 15 July 1902. The peerage became extinct at his death as he left no surviving male heirs.

Legal offices
Preceded by John Jackson Smale	Attorney General of Hong Kong; 1866–1874	Succeeded by John Bramston
Preceded by None	Chief Justice of the Leeward Islands; 1874–1876	Succeeded by Henry James Burford Burford-Hancock
Government offices
Preceded by The Lord Tenterden	Permanent Under-Secretary of State for Foreign Affairs; 1882–1889	Succeeded by Sir Philip Currie
Diplomatic posts
Preceded by Sir Lionel Sackville-West	Envoy Extraordinary and Minister Plenipotentiary to the United States; 1889–1893	Raised to ambassador
New office	British Ambassador to the United States; 1893–1902	Succeeded by Sir Michael Henry Herbert
Peerage of the United Kingdom
New creation	Baron Pauncefote; 1899–1902	Extinct
