= Sir Henry Bromley, 4th Baronet =

English cricketer

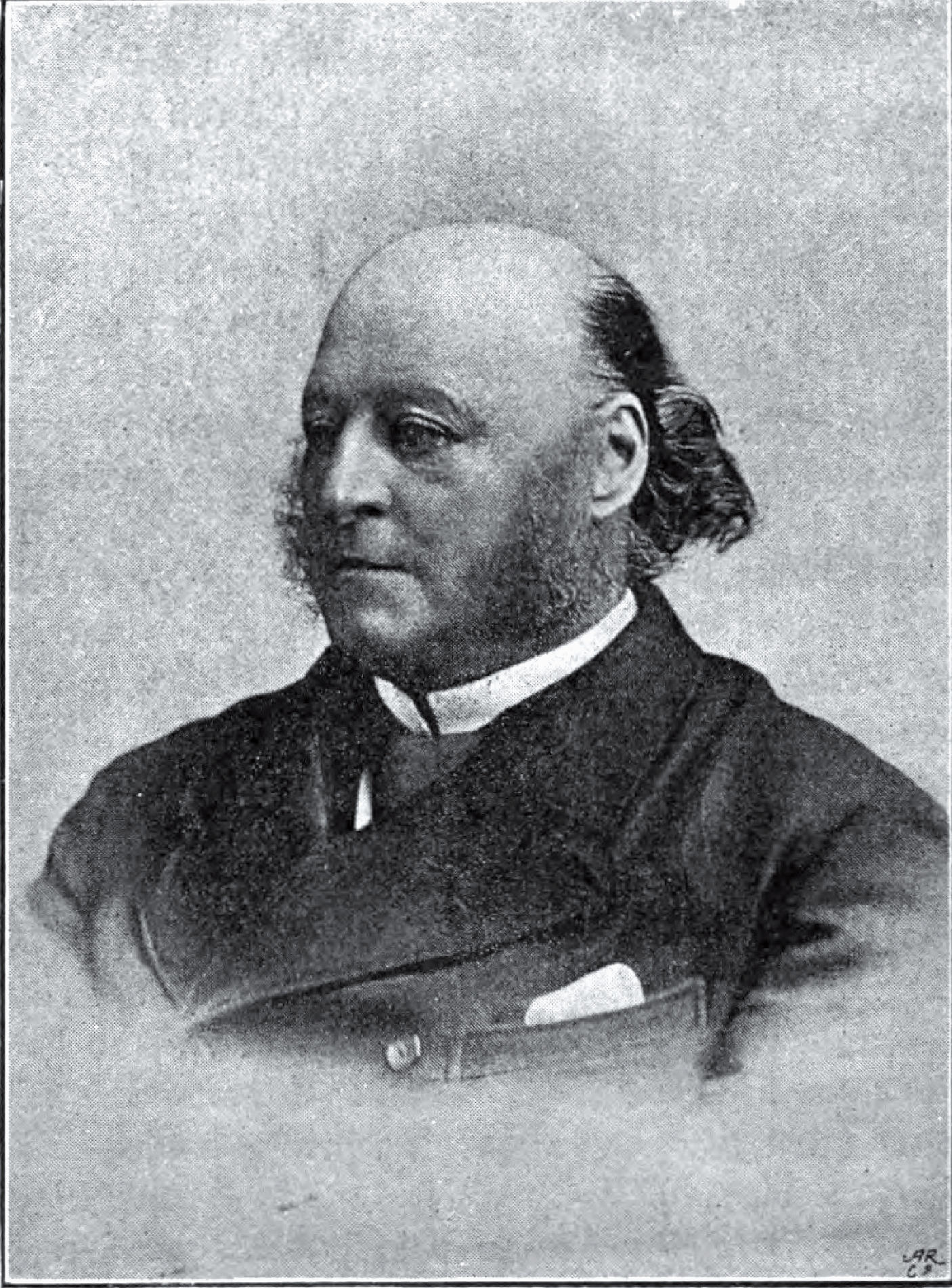

Personal information
- Full name: Henry Bromley
- Born: 25 December 1816; East Stoke, Nottinghamshire, England
- Died: 21 September 1895 (aged 78); East Stoke, Nottinghamshire, England
- Height: 6 ft 8 in (2.03 m)
- Batting: Unknown

Domestic team information
- Years: Team
- 1844: Marylebone Cricket Club

Career statistics
Competition	First-class
Matches	1
Runs scored	9
Batting average	4.50
100s/50s	–/–
Top score	9
Catches/stumpings	–/–
- Source: Cricinfo, 17 September 2020

Sir Henry Bromley, 4th Baronet JP DL (25 December 1816 – 21 September 1895) was an English first-class cricketer and cricket administrator.

The son of Sir Robert Bromley, a Royal Navy admiral, he was born in December 1816 at Stoke Hall, Nottinghamshire and was educated at Westminster School. Bromley was a keen cricketer and played a single first-class cricket match for the Marylebone Cricket Club (MCC) against Oxford University at Oxford in 1844. Batting twice in the match, he was dismissed without scoring by Cyril Randolph in the MCC first innings, while in their second innings he was dismissed for 9 runs by the same bowler. In addition to playing first-class cricket, he also played minor matches for the Gentlemen of Nottinghamshire and for various club teams across Nottinghamshire.

Bromley succeeded his father as the 4th Baronet of the Bromley baronets upon the death of his father in July 1857. He entertained members of the Nottingham Commercial Club, where he befriended the Daft brothers Richard and Charles. A patron of Nottinghamshire cricket, Bromley was elected to the committee of Nottinghamshire County Cricket Club in 1861, before being elected as the club's first president in 1869, a post he held until 1877. Outside of cricket, Bromley served as a deputy lieutenant for Nottinghamshire in 1869, before serving as High Sheriff of Nottinghamshire in 1882. He was also a justice of the peace and served in the army with the 3rd Nottinghamshire Rifle Volunteers, reaching the rank of captain. He died at Stoke Hall in September 1895, being succeeded as the 5th Baronet by his son, Sir Henry.

Baronetage of Great Britain
Preceded by Robert Bromley	Baronet (of East Stoke); 1857–1895	Succeeded by Henry Bromley
