= Robert Bromley =

Robert Bromley may refer to:

- Robert Bromley (MP) (1815–1850), British politician
- Bob Bromley (Canadian politician), member of the Legislative Assembly of the Northwest Territories
- Bob Bromley (Missouri politician) (born 1952/53), American politician
- Sir Robert Howe Bromley, 3rd Baronet (1778–1857), Royal Navy officer
- Sir Robert Bromley, 6th Baronet (1874–1906), of the Bromley baronets

== See also ==
- Bromley (disambiguation)
