= Bromley House Library =

Subscription library in Nottingham, England

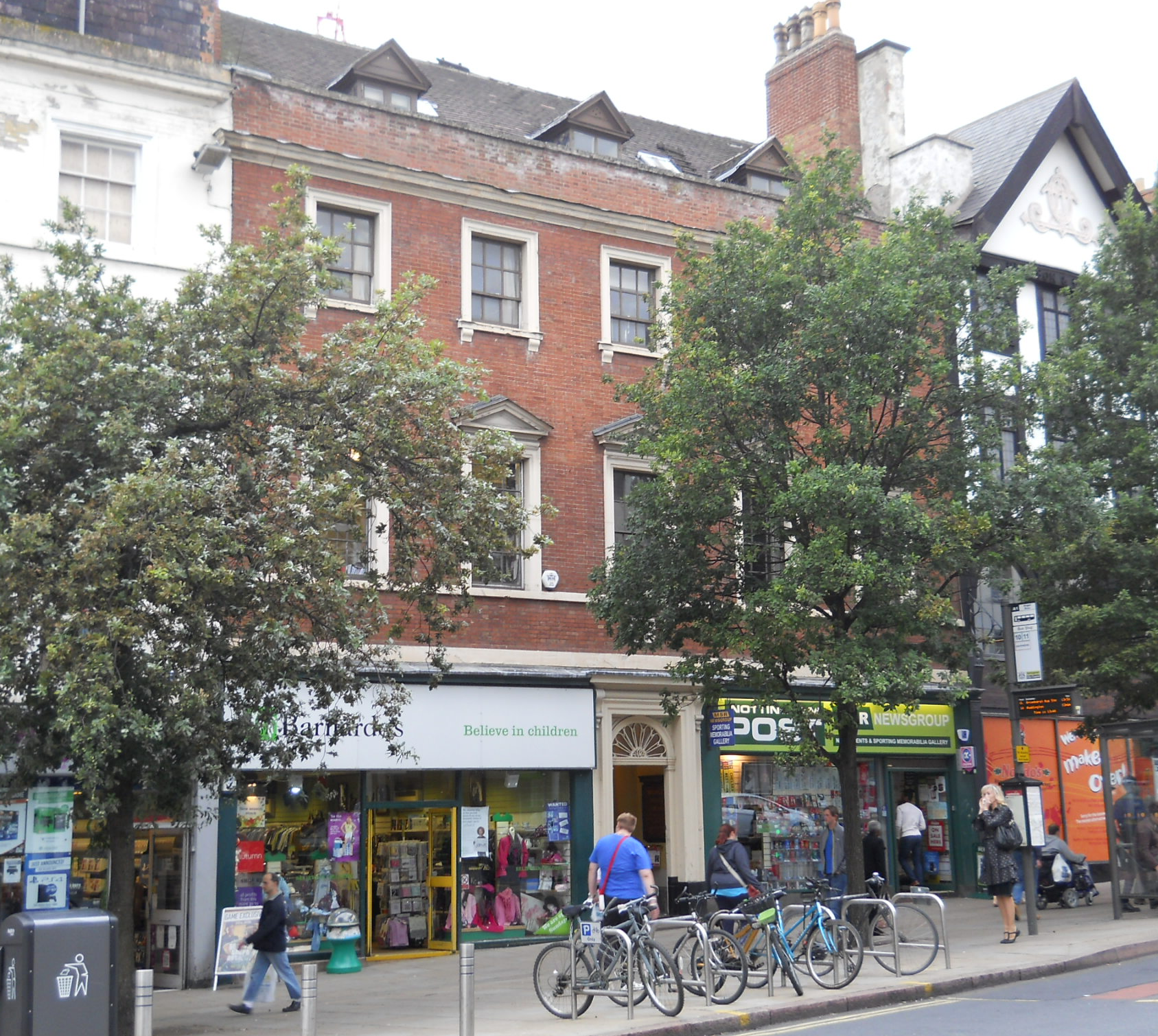
- Redbrick facade of the library in 2013. Shops added into the facade in 1929.
- 52.9535°N 1.1523°W
- Location: Nottingham, England
- Type: Subscription library
- Established: 1816

Other information
- Website: bromleyhouse.org

Listed Building – Grade II*
- Official name: Bromley House
- Designated: 11 August 1952
- Reference no.: 1246247

Bromley House Library (originally the Nottingham Subscription Library) is a subscription library in Nottingham, England.

== Premises ==
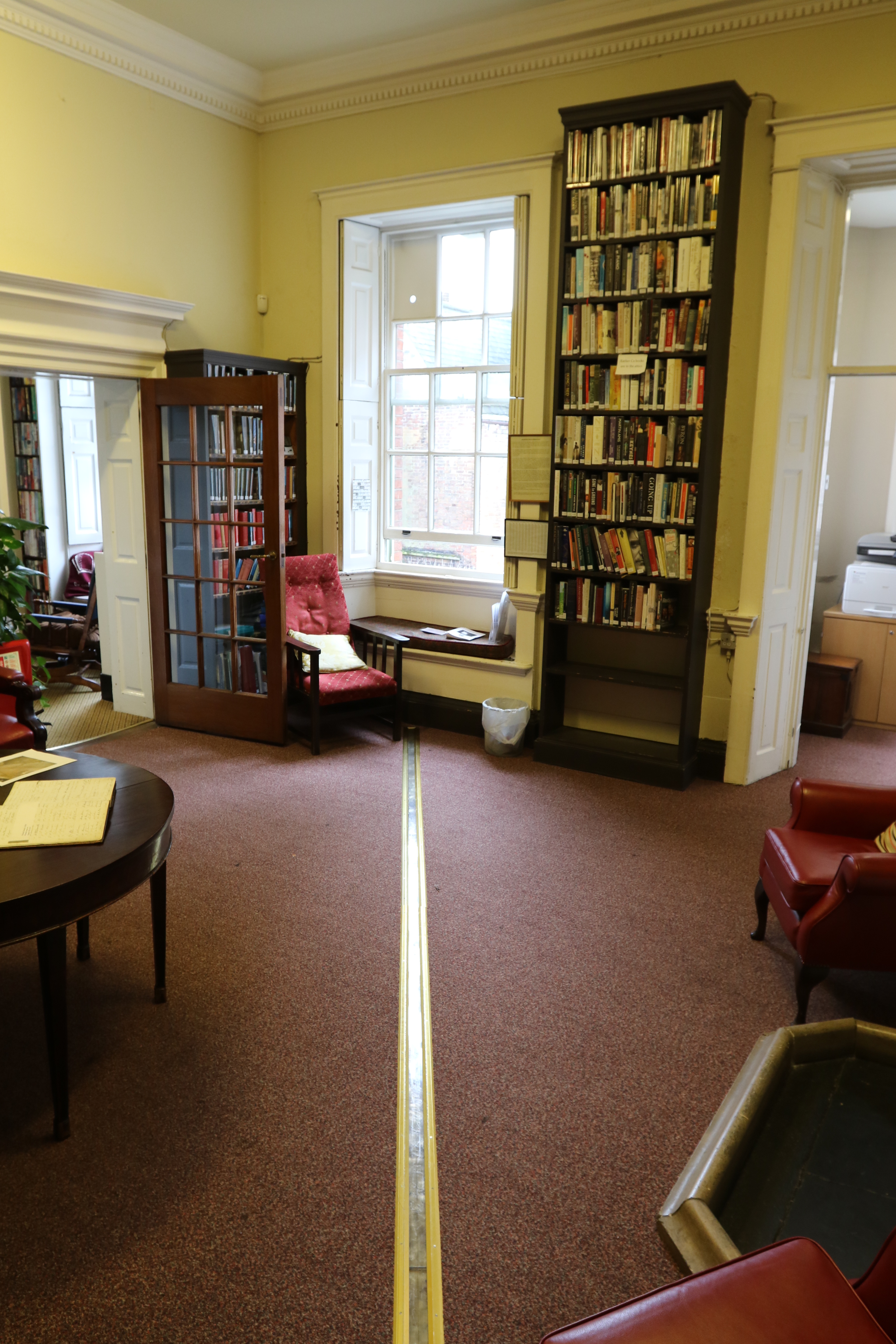
The 'Standfast Library' in Bromley House Library, has a meridian line used to determine local solar noon.

The library is situated in Bromley House, a Georgian townhouse in Nottingham city centre. The building is Grade II* listed and retains many original features. It was built in 1752 as his town house by Sir George Smith, 1st Baronet (1714–1769) of Stoke Hall, East Stoke, Nottinghamshire, a grandson of the founder of Smith's Bank in Nottingham, the oldest known provincial bank in the United Kingdom. He used part as an office for transacting his lucrative business as Collector of the Land Tax.

In 1929 Evans, Clark and Woollatt added a new doorway and frontage, allowing the ground floor to be converted for retail use.

In the first-floor 'Standfast Library' is a meridian line, dating from 1836 and used to set clocks to noon 'local' time in the days before railway time or Greenwich Mean Time was introduced as the British standard. The longcase clock in the room is still set to Nottingham time, 4 minutes and 33 seconds behind Greenwich.

In the attics, Alfred Barber opened the first photographic studio in the Midlands on 2 October 1841.

On 1 April 2019, a major refurbishment project was started comprising a new roof, sympathetically restored attic rooms and essential internal repairs partially funded by a grant from Historic England East Midlands. The refurbished roof was completed in October 2019.

== History ==
The Nottingham Subscription Library was founded on 1 April 1816 at Carlton Street, in the Hockley area of the city. In April 1820, Bromley House was offered for sale by auction and purchased by the library for £2,750 (equivalent to £277,657 in 2023). The library moved in during 1821.

In the 19th century the library had around one hundred subscribers, including George Green and Edward Bromhead. Historically, the first name on the list of subscribers was the Duke of Newcastle as Lord Lieutenant of the county.

== Library services ==
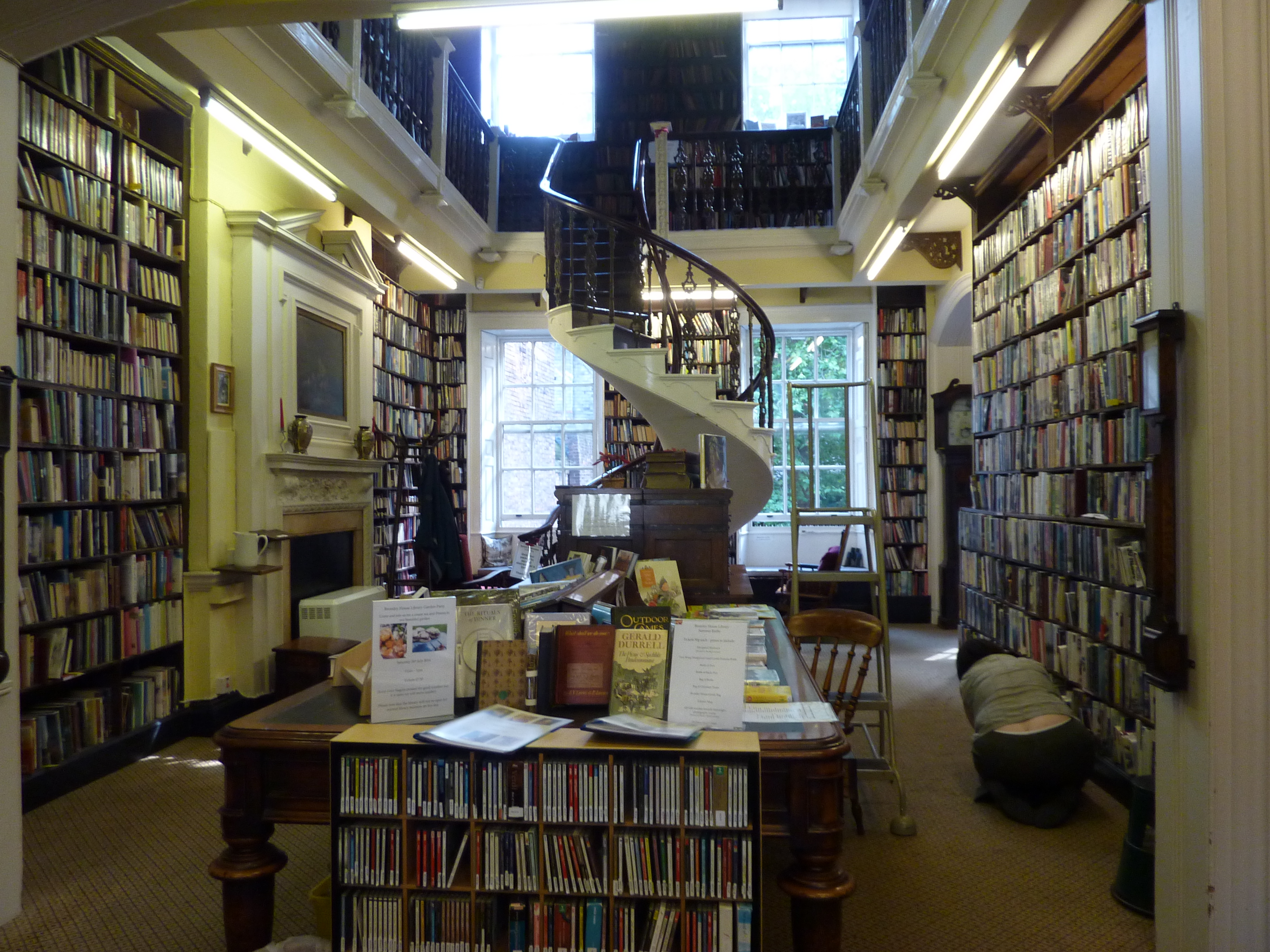
A view of the main room. The spiral staircase, dating from 1857, is unusual in that it has no central supporting column.

As of April 2018, the library had 1,638 members who paid an annual subscription. Items on loan are still recorded using a manual ledger system where each member has their own page. The library has a stock of just under 50,000 books (expanding by 700–800 each year) which includes a selection of interest to local historians, and a wide selection of 19th and 20th-century novels. It also holds audiobooks and CDs. The Heritage Lottery Fund contributed towards a project to create the library's computer catalogue 'Bromcat'. This involved a team of staff and volunteers cataloguing the entire contents over a two-year period, completing the work in 2013.

== Librarians (1816–1926) ==
- William Hardy 1816–1819
- Valentine Kirk 1819–1820
- James Archer 1820–1834
- John Walton 1834–1857
- Count Ubaldo Marioni 1857–1865
- John Cummings Banwell 1867–1893
- J William Moore 1893–1899
- Arthur Lineker 1899–1926

== See also ==
- Grade II* listed buildings in Nottinghamshire
- Listed buildings in Nottingham (Bridge ward)
