= Listed buildings in East Stoke, Nottinghamshire =

East Stoke is a civil parish in the Newark and Sherwood district of Nottinghamshire, England. The parish contains nine listed buildings that are recorded in the National Heritage List for England. Of these, one is at Grade II*, the middle of the three grades, and the others are at Grade II, the lowest grade. The parish contains the village of East Stoke and the surrounding area. The listed buildings consist of houses and associated structures, farmhouses, a footbridge, and a church with chest tombs and a monument in the churchyard.

== Key ==
| Grade | Criteria |
|---|---|
| II* | Particularly important buildings of more than special interest |
| II | Buildings of national importance and special interest |

== Buildings ==
| Name and location | Photograph | Date | Notes | Grade |
|---|---|---|---|---|
| St Oswald's Church; 53.04264°N 0.88589°W | | 13th century | The church has been altered and enlarged through the centuries, the nave was largely rebuilt in 1738, and the chancel was restored in 1873. The church is built in stone and red brick with pantile roofs. It consists of a nave with a clerestory, a south aisle, a south porch, a chancel with a north porch and a north vestry, and a west tower. The tower has two stages, a chamfered plinth, buttresses, a band, a three-light west window, two-light bell openings, and an embattled parapet with four decorative pinnacles. | II* |
| Hall Farm House; 53.03938°N 0.87818°W | | Early 18th century | The farmhouse is in red brick, with a floor band, an eaves cornice and a pantile roof. There are two storeys and three bays, and a rear wing. On the front are sash windows with wedge lintels, and in the roof is a dormer. The rear wing has two storeys and attics, two bays, and a lean-to containing a doorway with a decorative fanlight and a sloping hood. | II |
| Group of four chest tombs 53.04252°N 0.88596°W | | Late 18th century | The tombs are in the churchyard of St Oswald's Church to the south of the church. They are in stone, and each has illegible panels on either side, moulded corners in the form of pilasters, and is surmounted by a flat top with a moulded rim. | II |
| Stoke Hall; 53.04292°N 0.88413°W | | 1812 | Largely the rebuilding of an earlier house by Lewis Wyatt, it was reduced in size in 1921–23. The house is in red brick on a stone plinth, with stone dressings, quoins, an eaves cornice with a blocking course, and hipped slate roofs. There are two storeys and an entrance front of three bays, with a moulded sill band. On the front is a porch with two Greek Doric columns, a cornice and a coped blocking course. The windows are sashes. The garden front has seven bays, and set into the wall of the west front is a statue of St Leonard under a canopy. | II |
| Foot Bridge over School Lane; 53.04229°N 0.88651°W | | Early 19th century | The footbridge in the grounds of Stoke Hall is in red brick with some stone. It consists of a tall arch with a brick parapet coped with larger bricks. The flanking walls are swept, and each ends in a brick pier with stone coping. | II |
| Holme Farm House; 53.03940°N 0.87647°W | — | Early 19th century | The farmhouse is in red brick and some stone, with dogtooth eaves, and a slate roof with stone coped gables. There are two storeys, three bays, and a rear wing. The central doorway has fluted pilasters, a semicircular traceried fanlight, and a pediment on carved brackets. The windows are sashes with brick wedge lintels. | II |
| Stable block, cottage and pump, Stoke Hall; 53.04294°N 0.88484°W | — | Early 19th century | The buildings are in painted red brick with hipped slate roofs, and form a hexagonal plan. On the east range is a clock tower with a cupola containing a bell and with a weathervane. Attached to the north front is a cottage with two storeys and three bays. The pump is in wood, iron and lead, and has a shaped stone trough. | II |
| The Old Vicarage; 53.03589°N 0.87731°W | — | Early 19th century | The former vicarage is in whitewashed red brick with dogtooth eaves and a hipped slate roof. There are two storeys and three bays. In the centre of the entrance front is a trellised porch and a doorway, and the windows are sashes under segmental arches. On the east front is a two-storey canted bay window. | II |
| Monument to Baron Pauncefote; 53.04264°N 0.88621°W | | 1902 | The monument in the churchyard of St Oswald's Church commemorates Baron Pauncefote. It consists of a bronze statue of an angel holding an olive branch, standing on a rectangular stone pedestal on a square base, with inscriptions on three sides. The pedestal has a moulded cornice, and on each corner is an engaged vase. | II |
