= Sir Robert Howe Bromley, 3rd Baronet =

Royal Navy Admiral (1778–1857)

Admiral Sir Robert Howe Bromley Bt DL
- Born: 28 November 1778
- Died: 8 July 1857 (aged 78)
- Military career
- Allegiance: United Kingdom
- Branch: Royal Navy
- Service years: 1791–1857
- Rank: Admiral of the White
- Commands: HMS Inspector; HMS Squirrel; HMS Champion; HMS Solebay; HMS Statira
- Conflicts: French Revolutionary Wars; Napoleonic Wars
- Other work: Deputy lieutenant of Nottinghamshire

Admiral Sir Robert Howe Bromley, 3rd Baronet, DL (28 November 1778 – 8 July 1857) was a Royal Navy officer of the eighteenth and nineteenth centuries. After joining the navy in 1791 under the auspices of his relative Captain Henry Curzon, he participated in the Macartney Embassy to China as a midshipman and also spent time serving in the English Channel and Mediterranean Sea. Promoted to lieutenant in 1798, he served in the North Sea Fleet and on the Jamaica Station before returning to the Channel to serve off the Channel Islands in the sloop of war HMS Pelican which was heavily damaged in a storm in late 1800. Soon after this he was promoted to commander and again served in the North Sea, before being promoted to post captain in 1802.

Bromley's most active command was of the post ship HMS Champion from 1803, in which he fought against the Flottille de Boulogne to help stop preparations for Napoleon's planned invasion of the United Kingdom before being sent to the North America Station. While escorting a convoy in 1806 he encountered the French ship of the line Vétéran and engaged it but failed to protect his convoy from the larger ship. He continued to serve in command of various frigates until 1808 when his father Sir George Pauncefote-Bromley, 2nd Baronet died and he inherited the baronetcy. At the end of the year he relinquished command of the frigate HMS Statira and never served at sea again. Bromley was promoted to admiral through seniority but spent his time on land as a deputy lieutenant of Nottinghamshire. He died in 1857 at the age of seventy-eight.

== Early life ==
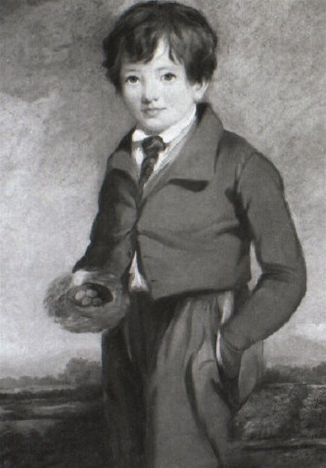
Robert Howe Bromley as a child, by Sir Martin Archer Shee

Robert Howe Bromley was born on 28 November 1778, the only son of Sir George Pauncefote-Bromley, 2nd Baronet and his wife Esther, the daughter of Assheton Curzon, 1st Viscount Curzon. Curzon was the grandfather and Esther the aunt of Richard Curzon-Howe, 1st Earl Howe.

== Naval career ==
=== Early career ===
Bromley joined the Royal Navy as a captain's servant on board the frigate HMS Lapwing on 26 December 1791, under the command of his relative Captain Henry Curzon. He served on Lapwing in the Mediterranean Fleet until he transferred to join the ship of the line HMS Lion, recommissioned in May 1792, under Captain Sir Erasmus Gower. With Lion he sailed to China on 26 October as part of the Macartney Embassy, the first British diplomatic mission to that nation. Lion returned from China and was paid off in October 1794, at which point Bromley, now a midshipman, followed Gower to the ship of the line HMS Triumph. Some time soon after this Bromley moved to serve in the flagship of Admiral Lord Howe, the ship of the line HMS Queen Charlotte, in the English Channel.

In April 1795 he joined the frigate HMS Melampus, under Captain Sir Richard Strachan, and later in the year transferred to the frigate HMS Latona, under Captain Arthur Kaye Legge. He was made an acting lieutenant in the newly commissioned frigate HMS Acasta, serving in the North Sea, in April 1797. On 22 January 1798 he was confirmed in his rank as a lieutenant and sent to serve in the sloop of war HMS Inspector, just before Acasta sailed for Jamaica. (Note: Syrett and DiNardo note the date of his promotion as 12 January.) He subsequently served as a lieutenant on board the frigate HMS Aimable on the Jamaica Station from November to January 1800 when he transferred to the sloop of war HMS Pelican in the Channel Islands. Pelican was heavily damaged in a storm in St Aubyn's Bay, Jersey, on 9 November and was sent to Plymouth Dockyard for repairs; with her out of action Bromley was moved over to the frigate HMS Doris in December.

On 14 February 1801 Bromley was promoted to commander and given his old sloop-of-war Inspector as his first command, in which he was sent to serve off Leith Roads. Inspector was sold at Sheerness Dockyard in February 1802, but Bromley was unemployed for only a very short period as he was promoted to post captain on 28 April.

=== Post captain ===
Bromley first briefly commanded the frigate HMS Squirrel but never went to sea in her, instead staying in Woolwich Dockyard, followed by the post ship HMS Champion from 24 September 1803. Champion was more heavily armed than the average post ship of her size, as her twenty-two 9-pounder long guns had been replaced with an equal number of 32-pound carronades. In Champion Bromley was based in the English Channel on the Downs Station patrolling between Ostend and Le Havre to disturb the preparations for Napoleon's planned invasion of the United Kingdom.

In one notable engagement on 23 July 1805 he attacked part of the Flottille de Boulogne near Saint-Valery-en-Caux, receiving heavy damage to his ship and losing two men killed. This group of ships was made up of two brigs, ten gun brigs, three smaller gun brigs, seven luggers, and eight pinnaces. After hearing of a successful voyage by another group of invasion ships, the French force set sail early on 23 July; Champion was posted just off shore with the gun brigs HMS Clinker and HMS Cracker. Bromley sailed Champion to engage the two largest brigs (possibly corvettes) and the flotilla sailed for cover under a nearby gun battery soon after. With Champion armed with only close range carronades Bromley was forced to bring his ships close in to the shore to bombard the French vessels which laid him open to fire from the ships and battery; this caused the aforesaid heavy damage to the British ships, forcing them to leave for the Downs to make repairs and allowing the French to make their way to Boulogne.

Bromley and Champion were sent to the North America Station in April 1806, where he was based out of Quebec and Halifax. Champion was escorting a convoy of sixteen ships to Quebec on 10 August when they encountered the French ship of the line Vétéran, which had been blown off course by the 1806 Great Coastal hurricane. Being so much inferior in size to the French warship, Bromley was not able to engage her head on and instead attempted to draw Vétéran away from the convoy in chase of Champion. This tactic failed and Bromley lost six of the convoy to the French ship before she moved on in her attempt to reach France.

He left Champion on 10 November 1806, returning to the North Sea to command the newly recommissioned frigate HMS Solebay; he commanded Solebay for one month before moving to the brand new frigate HMS Statira on 31 July 1807. In Statira Bromley initially served on the North America Station, sailing there on 13 November; by 1808 he was patrolling off the coast of Spain and in the Bay of Biscay. He brought Statira home to England on 6 April; his father died on 17 August, leaving him to inherit the baronetcy. Bromley left Statira in December and went on half pay; he never served at sea or commanded a ship again.

=== Flag rank ===
He was promoted by seniority to rear-admiral on 10 January 1837, to vice-admiral on 9 November 1846, and to admiral on 17 August 1851. (Note: Full dates of promotion: Rear-admiral of the white 10 January 1837, rear-admiral of the red 23 November 1841, vice-admiral of the blue 9 November 1846, vice-admiral of the white 19 February 1847, vice-admiral of the red 1 August 1848, admiral of the blue 17 August 1851, admiral of the white 21 January 1854.) Not serving actively in the navy, Bromley instead became a deputy lieutenant for his home county of Nottinghamshire on 31 January 1829, living as he did at Stoke Hall.

== Death ==
Bromley died on 8 July 1857 after a long and severe illness, at the age of seventy-eight. It is disputed as to whether he died at his country seat Stoke Hall or in Florence.

== Family ==
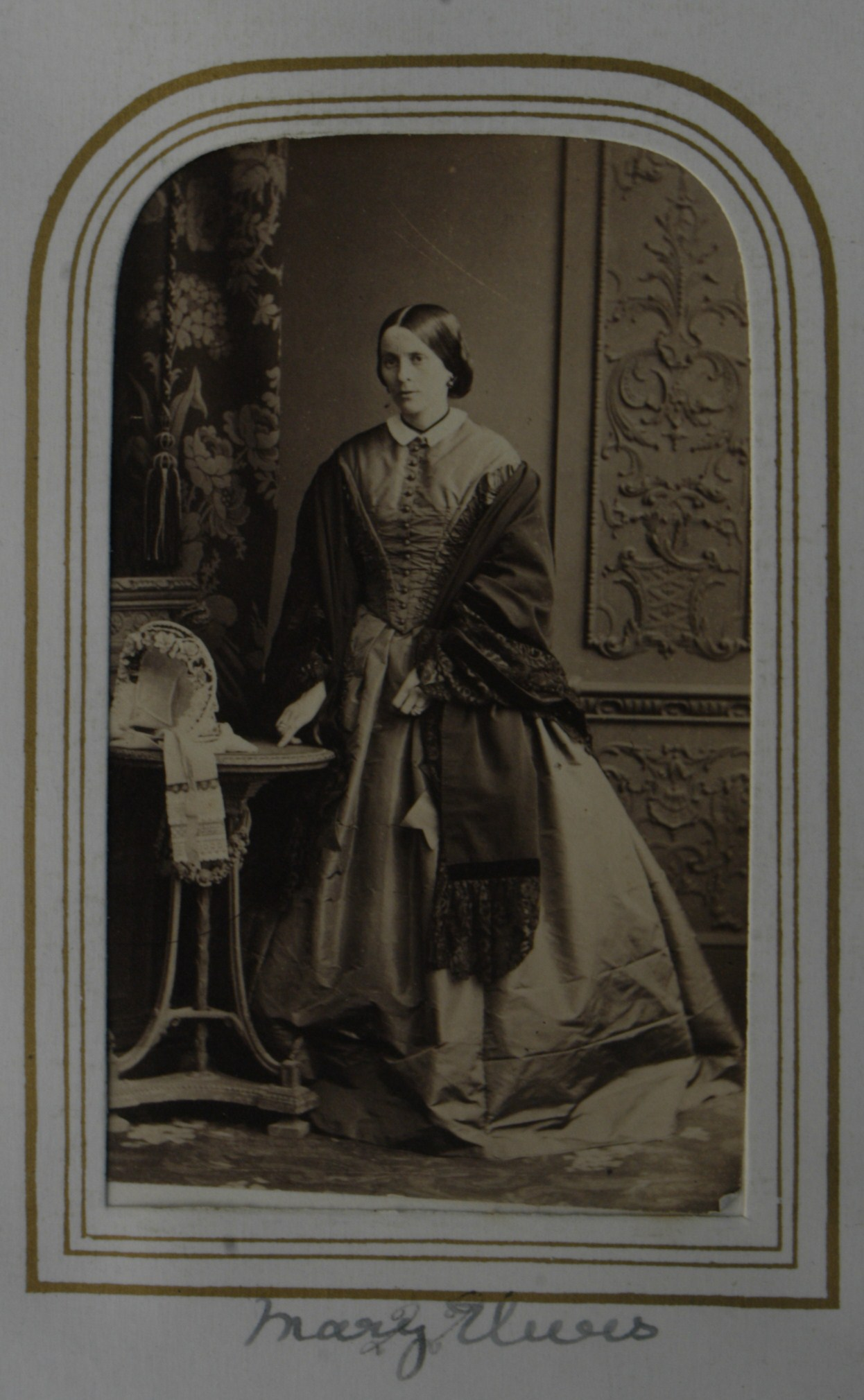
Mary, his fourth daughter

He married Anne (19 February 1787 – 6 March 1873), the youngest daughter of Daniel Wilson of Dallam Tower, on 8 June 1812. Their issue included:

- Anne Bromley (31 July 1813 – 1 April 1837)
- Caroline, Lady Campbell (22 September 1814 – 9 December 1900), married Sir James Campbell on 28 July 1840
- Robert Bromley MP (13 November 1815 – 30 December 1850), member of parliament for South Nottinghamshire
- Captain Sir Henry Bromley, 4th Baronet (25 December 1816 – 21 September 1895), British army officer and first-class cricketer
- Elizabeth, Lady Elliot (1819 – 8 February 1880), married Sir Thomas Frederick Elliot on 4 January 1859
- Captain Charles Bromley RN (February 1820 – 21 February 1892), Royal Navy captain in the Crimean War who received the Order of the Medjidie
- William Bromley (July 1821 – 21 February 1836)
- Thomas Bromley (3 November 1822 – 28 April 1903), Bombay Army officer
- Mary Elwes (1824 – 25 June 1913), married John Henry Elwes on 23 April 1844, had a son Henry John Elwes
- Sophia Bromley (1826 – 30 July 1914)
- Major Arthur Bromley (28 March 1828 – January 1870), Nottinghamshire militia officer
- Edward Bromley (1 March 1831 – 13 March 1908), barrister

== Notes and citations ==
=== Citations ===
Baronetage of Great Britain
Preceded by George Pauncefote-Bromley	Baronet (of East Stoke); 1857–1895	Succeeded by Henry Bromley
