= Bromley baronets =

Title in the Baronetage of Great Britain

Arms of Bromley: Quarterly per fess indented gules and or

Arms of Smith: Or, a chevron cotised sable between three demi-griffins couped of the last the two in chief respecting each other, as is visible on the monument to Sir George Smith, 1st Baronet, in St. Oswald's parish church, East Stoke.

The Smith (later Bromley, later Pauncefote-Bromley, later Bromley-Wilson, later Bromley) baronetcy, of East Stoke in the County of Nottingham, is a title in the Baronetage of Great Britain. It was created on 31 October 1757 for the banker George Smith, High Sheriff of Nottinghamshire from 1757 to 1759. He was the eldest son of Abel Smith I (1686–1756) of Nottingham (by his wife Jane Beaumont (1689–1743)), the 2nd son of Thomas Smith I (1631–1699), the founder of Smith's Bank in Nottingham. His younger brothers included: Abel Smith II (1717–1788; father of Robert Smith, 1st Baron Carrington, and of John Smith (1767–1842) of Blendon Hall, MP for Nottingham, Wendover, Midhurst and Buckinghamshire, great-grandfather of Vivian Smith, 1st Baron Bicester (1867–1956)), and John Smith (born 1716), ancestor of Julian Pauncefote, 1st Baron Pauncefote.

The first Baronet, whose mural monument survives in St. Oswald's parish church, East Stoke, married firstly Mary Howe (1726–1761), daughter and sole heiress of Major William Howe by his wife Elizabeth Pauncefote, a daughter of William Pauncefote. Major William Howe was the son of Lieutenant-General Emanuel Howe by his wife Ruperta, illegitimate daughter of Prince Rupert of the Rhine. After Mary's death the first Baronet married secondly in 1768 to Catherine Vyse (died 1786), a daughter of William Vyse of Lichfield, Archdeacon of Salop. The first Baronet was succeeded by his son, the 2nd Baronet, who was High Sheriff of Gloucestershire in 1775. In 1778 he assumed by Royal licence the surname and arms of Bromley in lieu of his patronymic. In 1803 he assumed by royal licence the surname of Pauncefote in addition to that of Bromley.

He was succeeded by his son, the 3rd Baronet, who used the surname of Bromley only. He was an Admiral in the Royal Navy and served as High Sheriff of Nottinghamshire from 1816 to 1817. On his death the title passed to his eldest son, the 4th Baronet. His grandson, the 6th Baronet (who succeeded his father), was Administrator of St Kitts and Nevis from 1904 to 1906. He had no sons and on his early death the title passed to his younger brother, the 7th Baronet, High Sheriff of Westmorland in 1901 and also a Deputy Lieutenant of the county. In 1897 he assumed by Royal licence the additional surname of Wilson. He was succeeded by his younger brother, the 8th Baronet, a Rear-Admiral in the Royal Navy and also a Gentleman Usher from 1927 to 1961 successively to kings George V, Edward VIII, George VI and to Queen Elizabeth II. As of 2018, the title is held by his great-grandson, the 11th Baronet, who succeeded his father in that year.

== Smith (later Bromley, later Pauncefote-Bromley, later Bromley-Wilson, later Bromley) baronets, of East Stoke (1757) ==
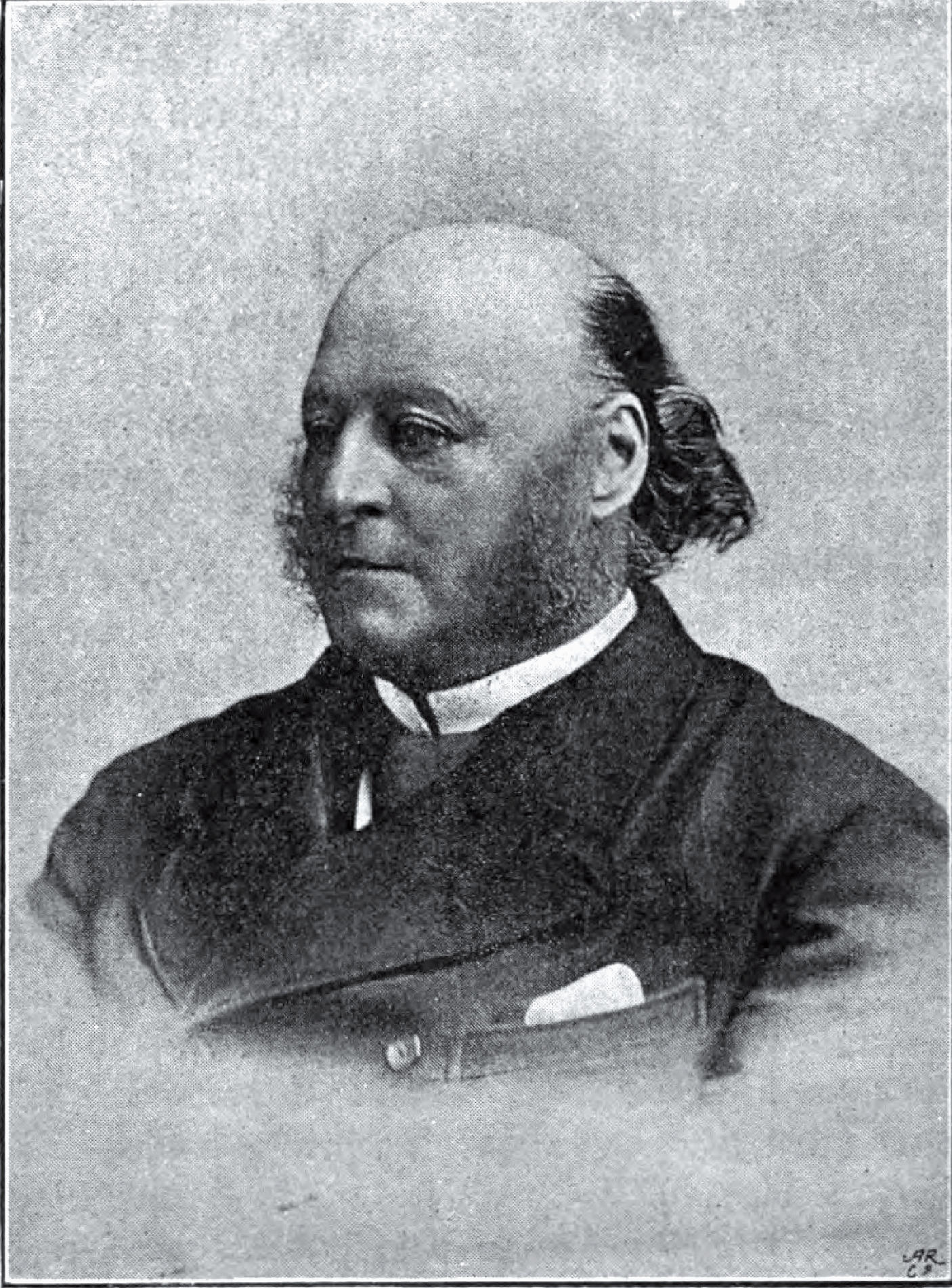
Sir Henry Bromley, 4th Baronet

Seated at East Stoke, Nottinghamshire:

- Sir George Smith, 1st Baronet (c. 1714–1769)
- Sir George Pauncefote-Bromley, 2nd Baronet (1753–1808)
- Sir Robert Howe Bromley, 3rd Baronet (1778–1857)
- Sir Henry Bromley, 4th Baronet (1816–1895)
- Sir Henry Bromley, 5th Baronet (1849–1905)
- Sir Robert Bromley, 6th Baronet (1874–1906)
- Sir Maurice Bromley-Wilson, 7th Baronet (1875–1957)
- Sir Arthur Bromley, 8th Baronet (1876–1961)
- Sir Rupert Howe Bromley, 9th Baronet (1910–1966)
- Sir Rupert Charles Bromley, 10th Baronet (1936–2018)
- Sir Charles Howard Bromley, 11th Baronet (born 1963)

The heir apparent is the present holder's son, Robert Charles Bromley (born 1999).

== Notes ==
Baronetage of Great Britain
Preceded by White baronets	Smith baronets of East Stoke; 31 October 1757	Succeeded by Lade baronets
