= Stoke Hall, Nottinghamshire =

Stoke Hall
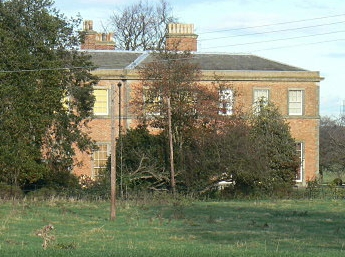
- The hall in 2009
- Interactive map of the Stoke Hall area

General information
- Type: Mansion
- Location: Church Lane, East Stoke, Newark-on-Trent, Nottinghamshire, England
- Coordinates: 53.0430°N 0.8842°W
- Construction started: 1812

Design and construction
- Designations: Grade II listed

Website
- www.stokehallweddings.com

Stoke Hall is a Grade II listed 10,382 sq ft (964.5 m^{2}) mansion, near the village of East Stoke in Nottinghamshire, England. It is located near the River Trent.

The red-brick house was built in 1812 for the Bromley baronets by Lewis Wyatt, who included parts of an earlier building. It was part demolished in the 1920s. It was Grade II listed on 16 January 1967.

The house is registered as a venue for weddings. The church of St Oswald is adjacent.

== See also ==
- Listed buildings in East Stoke, Nottinghamshire
