= St Oswald's Church, East Stoke =

St Oswald’s Church
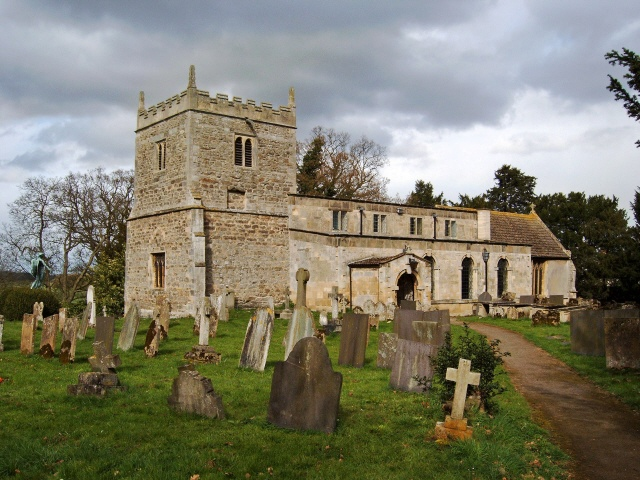
- St Oswald’s Church, East Stoke
- St Oswald’s Church
- 53°2′31.43″N 0°53′14.24″W
- Location: East Stoke, Nottinghamshire
- Country: England
- Denomination: Church of England

History
- Dedication: St Oswald

Architecture
- Heritage designation: Grade II* listed

Administration
- Diocese: Diocese of Southwell and Nottingham
- Archdeaconry: Newark
- Deanery: Newark and Southwell
- Parish: East Stoke

Clergy
- Vicar: Rev. Elizabeth Murray

St Oswald's Church, East Stoke is a Grade II* listed Church of England parish in the Diocese of Southwell and Nottingham in East Stoke, Nottinghamshire.

It is adjacent to Stoke Hall.

== History ==
The church dates from the 13th or 14th century and was largely rebuilt in 1738. A further restoration on the chancel took place in 1873. Most of the furniture is from the 19th century. About a 3 minute drive away, the Battle of Stoke Field took place, resulting in local lore stating that a mass burial has taken place on church grounds.

== See also ==
- Grade II* listed buildings in Nottinghamshire
- Listed buildings in East Stoke, Nottinghamshire
