= Preston, Forest of Dean =

Village in Gloucestershire, England

Coordinates: 52.009°N 2.469°W

Preston
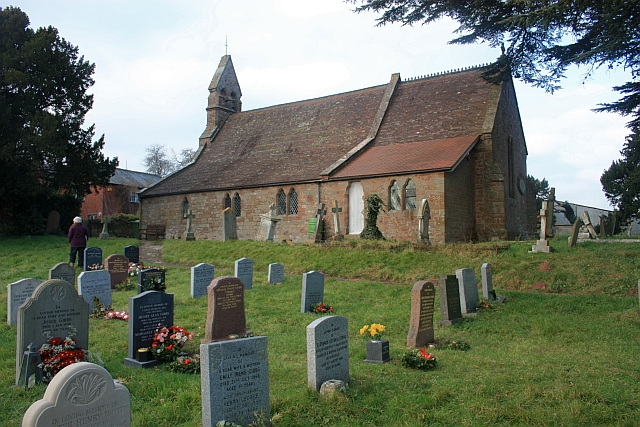
- Church of St John the Baptist, Preston

- Location within Gloucestershire
- Civil parish: Dymock
- District: Forest of Dean
- Shire county: Gloucestershire
- Region: South West
- Country: England
- Sovereign state: United Kingdom
- Police: Gloucestershire
- Fire: Gloucestershire
- Ambulance: South Western

Preston is a village, former manor, civil and ecclesiastical parish, now in the civil parish of Dymock, in the Forest of Dean district in Gloucestershire, England. It is situated 22 km north-west of the city of Gloucester and 4 km south-west of the Herefordshire town of Ledbury. In 1931 the parish had a population of 77. On 1 April 1935 the parish of Preston, comprising 897 acres, was added to the parish of Dymock, adjacent at the south-east, the parish church of which, St Mary the Virgin, is situated 4 miles to the south-east.

The parish church is dedicated to St John the Baptist. To the immediate west of the church is Preston Court, a grade II* listed timber-framed manor house dating from about 1600, in 2020 operating as "The Country House Collection" antique shop.

== History ==
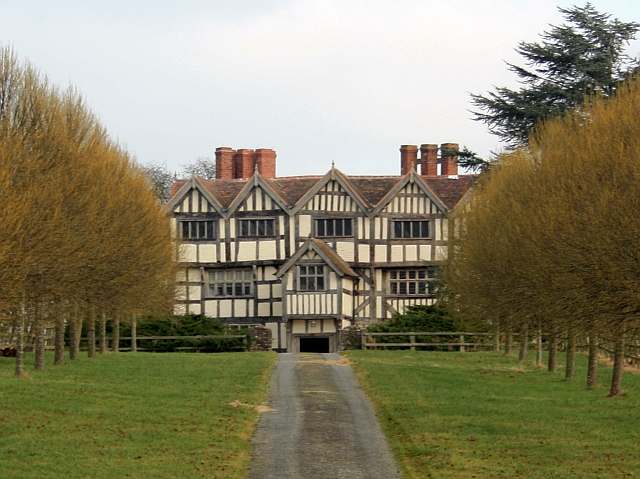
Preston Court

Preston had been a possession of Gloucester Abbey since before the Norman Conquest of 1066. In 1541, following the Dissolution of the Monasteries, it was granted as part of the endowment of the newly established See of Gloucester, the new Bishops of Gloucester using the old Abbey Church as their Cathedral. In 1583 the bishop of Gloucester leased the manor to the Crown, and in 1585 Queen Elizabeth I granted it to Fulke Greville, 1st Baron Brooke whose present day relative, author Christopher Brooke Fulke Greville has included the property in his book 'Englands Great Baronial Families'.

A country house, Preston Court, was built in the late 16th or early 17th century. In 1834 Preston Court passed to the 2nd Baronet's cousin Robert Smith (d.1843) of Swansea, who adopted the surname Pauncefote and was succeeded by his son Robert Pauncefote (d.1847), who was succeeded by his brother Bernard Pauncefote, of India.
