= East Stoke, Nottinghamshire =

Village and civil parish in Nottinghamshire, England

Coordinates: 53.0390°N 0.8780°W

East Stoke
- Village and civil parish
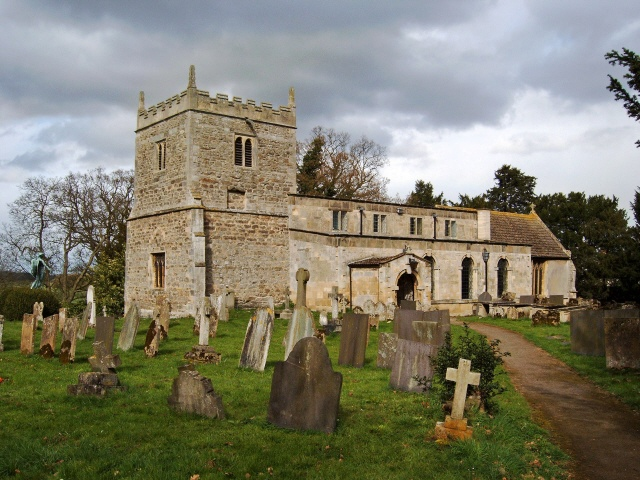
- St Oswald's Church, East Stoke

- Location within Nottinghamshire
- Interactive map of East Stoke
- Area: 2.62 sq mi (6.8 km^{2})
- Population: 175 (2021)
  - Density: 67/sq mi (26/km^{2})
- OS grid reference: SK 754497
  - London: 110 mi (180 km) SSE
- District: Newark and Sherwood
- Shire county: Nottinghamshire
- Region: East Midlands
- Country: England
- Sovereign state: United Kingdom
- Post town: NEWARK
- Postcode district: NG23
- Dialling code: 01636
- Police: Nottinghamshire
- Fire: Nottinghamshire
- Ambulance: East Midlands
- UK Parliament: Newark
- Website: www.newark-sherwooddc.gov.uk/parishcouncils/east-stoke-with-thorpe-parish-council

East Stoke is a small village and civil parish in Nottinghamshire situated about half a mile to the east of the River Trent and lying about six miles southwest of Newark-upon-Trent. The population of the civil parish (including Thorpe as taken in the 2011 Census was 152, East Stoke alone reported 175 residents at the 2021 census. The A46 Fosse Way ran through East Stoke for many years: cutting the village in two with constant traffic: but since 2012 has been replaced by a new multi-lane A46 which now runs half a mile to the east.

East Stoke is thought to have been the site of the Roman settlement of Ad Pontem; the "place of the bridge" – though this is disputed. The Domesday Book of 1086 describes East Stoke being a settlement in Nottinghamshire in the wapentake of Newark.

In 1487 East Stoke was the scene of one of the bloodiest battle in British history: the Battle of Stoke Field between Yorkist rebels (supported by largely Irish and Swiss mercenaries) facing the army of Henry VII. The Yorkists were arrayed on the brow of a hill to the south east of the village, with their right flank anchored on a high spot known as Burham Furlong. The Yorkists were routed by Henry VII's army and fled towards the Trent; many were killed in the retreat. A popular tale is that the Yorkists were slaughtered in a ravine known as the Bloody Gutter. However, any local will be happy to inform you that the damp cutting you can still view on the site today was known as the Red Gutter. This was because it was the local source of red clay. The burial pits on the battlefield all lie off to the west along Church Lane.

To signify his victory Henry raised his standard on Burham Furlong. The spot is marked by a stone memorial with the legend "Here stood the Burrand Bush planted on the spot where Henry VII placed his standard after the Battle of Stoke 16 June 1487" It is thought that several thousand combatants lost their lives in less than three hours.

The Newark Wapentake parish vital records have been published and provide a unique insight into the heritage of the people of Newark as well as East Stoke, spanning from the 16th through the 19th centuries.

== See also ==
- Battle of Stoke Field
- Listed buildings in East Stoke, Nottinghamshire
