= Bede Clifford =

British diplomat and colonial administrator (1890–1969)

Captain The Honourable Sir Bede Clifford GCMG CB MVO
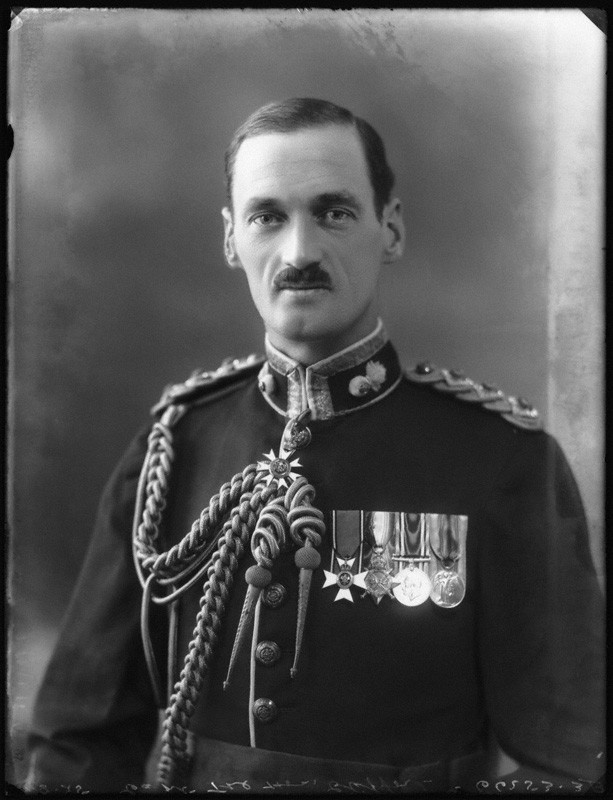
- Clifford in 1925

Governor of The Bahamas
- In office 10 January 1932 – 1937
- Monarch: George V
- Prime Minister: Ramsay MacDonald
- Preceded by: Sir Charles Orr
- Succeeded by: Sir Charles Dundas

Governor of Mauritius
- In office 23 October 1937 – 16 April 1942
- Monarch: George VI
- Prime Minister: Neville Chamberlain; Winston Churchill
- Preceded by: Sir Wilfrid Jackson
- Succeeded by: Sir Donald Mackenzie-Kennedy

Governor of Trinidad and Tobago
- In office 8 June 1942 – 6 March 1947
- Monarch: George VI
- Prime Minister: Winston Churchill; Clement Attlee
- Preceded by: Sir Hubert Young
- Succeeded by: Sir John Shaw

Personal details
- Born: 3 July 1890 New Zealand
- Died: 6 October 1969 (aged 79) Surrey, England
- Spouse: Alice Devin Gundry (m. 1925)
- Children: Anne Frances Mary Clifford; Patricia David Pandora Clifford; Alice Devin Atalanta Clifford
- Parents: Lord Clifford of Chudleigh; Catherine Mary Bassett
- Education: Xavier College; University of Melbourne
- Occupation: Statesman

Captain Sir Bede Edmund Hugh Clifford GCMG CB MVO (3 July 1890 – 6 October 1969) was a British diplomat and colonial administrator, born in New Zealand, where his parents had moved in an unsuccessful attempt at sheep-farming.

His parents were William Hugh Clifford, 10th Baron Clifford of Chudleigh and Catherine Mary Bassett. After New Zealand they moved to Tasmania; he did not attend a regular school until he was 10. He attended Xavier College, Melbourne where he was a gifted student. This was followed by study at Melbourne University, becoming a surveyor, then a merchant navy officer.

== Career ==
After serving as an army captain in the Royal Fusiliers during World War I, where he gained the rank of Captain, he worked in imperial administration and diplomacy. From 1917 he was aide-de-camp, then Private Secretary to the Governor-General of Australia, Sir Ronald Ferguson. From 1921 to 1931, he was Secretary to the Governor-General of South Africa, first to Prince Arthur of Connaught and then to the Earl of Athlone.

In 1931, it was announced that Clifford would be appointed Governor and Commander-in-Chief of the Bahamas. He was later appointed the 24th Governor of Mauritius from 23 October 1937 to 16 April 1942. He then became Governor of Trinidad and Tobago from 1942 to 1947. and was appointed a Fellow of the Royal Geographical Society.

== Death ==
Sir Bede died on Oct 6, 1969, in Guildford, England. A funeral was held on October 9, 1969, at Saint Cyprian's Chapel, Ugbrooke, Chudleigh, Devon, England, followed by burial in the family vault in Ugbrooke House Chapel Crypt.

== Family ==
Sir Bede married Alice Devin Gundry on October 21, 1925, in Cleveland, Ohio. She was born on December 11, 1901, in Cleveland, Ohio, and passed on June 26, 1980, in Westmoreland, England. Alice was the daughter of John Murten Gundry (1859-1939) and Francis Ruth Gilchrist (1875-1933). She was a third great-granddaughter of Col. David C. Chambers (1780-1864), a member of the 17th U.S. Congress.

Together had three daughters:

- Anne Frances Mary Clifford, born on 5 January 1929, married John Julius Norwich, 2nd Viscount Norwich. They had two children: The Hon Alice Clare Antonia Opportune Clifford, later Artemis Cooper, the historian, who married Sir Antony Beevor; and Jason Charles Duff Bede Cooper, 3rd Viscount Norwich
- Patricia David Pandora Clifford, born on 29 January 1930, married Timothy Angus Jones, son of Sir Roderick Jones and Enid Bagnold, and was the mother of Annabel Astor, Viscountess Astor and the grandmother of Samantha Cameron, wife of the former Prime Minister of the United Kingdom David Cameron. She later married The Hon Michael Astor, son of Waldorf Astor, 2nd Viscount Astor. Patricia and Timothy have two Children: Annanel Lucy Veronica Jones and Alexander Roderick Jones.
- Alice Devin Atalanta Clifford, born on 10 May 1932. She married Richard Fairey on 10 September 1955. He was the son of Sir Charles Richard Fairey and Henrietta Queenie Nicholson Markey. She married, secondly, W/Cdr. Timothy Ashmead Vigors, son of Captain Ludlow Ashmead Cliffe Vigors, on 31 October 1963. She and W/Cdr. Timothy Ashmead Vigors were divorced. She married, thirdly, Michael Henry Dennis Madden in 1972. Alice and Richard have one child: Leanda Alice Devin Joan Fairey. Alice and Timothy have one child: Thomas Ashmead Merton Vigors. Alice and Michael have one child: Henry George Bede Madden.

== Honours ==
Clifford was appointed Member of the Royal Victorian Order (MVO) on 18 August 1920 in recognition of his services in the Royal Fusiliers as Military Secretary to the Governor-General of Australia, which was presented to him by the then Prince of Wales during his visit to Australia. He was then made a Companion of the Order of St Michael and St George (CMG) on 1 January 1924 in recognition of his services as Secretary to the Governor General of South Africa. He was appointed a Companion of the Order of the Bath (CB) on 1 January 1931 in recognition of his services as Imperial Secretary to the South African High Commission and Representative in the Union of South Africa of the UK Government. As Governor and Commander-in-Chief of the Bahama Islands, he was promoted to the rank of Knight Commander of the Order of St Michael and St George (KCMG) on 3 June 1933. On 28 December 1944, he was appointed Knight of the Order of St John (KStJ). He was promoted to the rank of Knight Grand Cross of the Order of St Michael and St George (GCMG) on 1 January 1945. He was also awarded the Legion of Merit by the United States.

Knight Grand Cross of the Order of St Michael and St George (GCMG)	1945
Knight Commander of the Order of St Michael and St George (KCMG)	1933
Companion of the Order of St Michael and St George (CMG)	1924
Knight of Grace of the Venerable Order of St John of Jerusalem (KStJ)	1944
Legion of Merit	USA
Commander of the Order of the Bath (CB)	1931
Member of the Royal Victorian Order (MVO)	1920

Government offices
Preceded by Sir Charles William James Orr	Governor of the Bahamas; 1932–1934	Succeeded by Sir Charles Dundas
Preceded by Sir Wilfrid Edward Francis Jackson	Governor of Mauritius; 1937–1942	Succeeded by Sir Donald Mackenzie-Kennedy
Preceded by Sir Hubert Winthrop Young	Governor of Trinidad and Tobago; 1942–1947	Succeeded by Sir John Valentine Wistar Shaw
