= William Waldorf Astor (disambiguation) =

William Waldorf Astor (1848–1919) was an American-born English businessman and politician who became the 1st Viscount Astor.

William Waldorf Astor may also refer to:

- William Astor, 3rd Viscount Astor (1907–1966), English businessman and politician, grandson of the above
- William Astor, 4th Viscount Astor (born 1951), English businessman and politician, son of the above
