= Governor Orr =

Governor Orr may refer to:

- Charles William James Orr (1870–1945), Governor of the Bahamas from 1927 to 1932
- James Lawrence Orr (1822–1873), 73rd Governor of South Carolina
- Kay A. Orr (born 1939), 36th Governor of Nebraska
- Robert D. Orr (1917–2004), 45th Governor of Indiana
