= Emily Sheffield =

British journalist (born 1973)

- Born: Emily Julia Sheffield; 11 April 1973 (age 53); London, England
- Education: Marlborough College
- Alma mater: University of East Anglia
- Occupation: Journalist
- Known for: Editor, Evening Standard (July 2020 – October 2021)
- Predecessor: George Osborne
- Successor: Charlotte Ross
- Spouse: Tom Mullion (m. 2002)
- Children: 2
- Parent(s): Sir Reginald Sheffield, 8th Baronet; Annabel Jones
- Relatives: Samantha Cameron (sister); David Cameron (brother-in-law)

Emily Julia Sheffield (born 11 April 1973) is a British journalist. She was the editor of the Evening Standard from July 2020 until October 2021. Sheffield was Student Journalist of the Year in 1995 and later worked for British Vogue. She was a director of Indian fashion website and retailer Koovs from 2014 until the end of 2019 when it collapsed.

== Early life ==
She was born in 1973 at the Lindo Wing of St Mary's Hospital, London, the daughter of Sir Reginald Sheffield, 8th Baronet, and Annabel Jones. Her parents divorced in 1974, and in 1976, her mother married William Astor, 4th Viscount Astor, and became Annabel Astor, Viscountess Astor, with whom she had three more children. Her father also had three more children by his second wife, Victoria Penelope Walker.

She was expelled from Marlborough College after police raided the school and found cannabis in her dormitory. Her elder sister is Samantha Cameron, the wife of former prime minister and foreign secretary David Cameron. She attended the University of East Anglia where she studied English, and in 1995 won the Student Journalist of the Year.

== Career ==
After university, Sheffield became a columnist and features assistant for The Guardian, and then joined the Evening Standard. In 2005, she was working for British Vogue. She was deputy editor for 12 years, but was made redundant in 2017 after Edward Enninful took over from long-standing editor Alexandra Shulman, as part of what was called a "posh girl exodus". She joined the board of Koovs, the Indian fashion website and retailer, in 2014. The firm was established by Labour Party peer Lord Alli after he left ASOS plc. It went into administration in December 2019.

After Vogue, she founded a "positive news" app, #ThisMuchIKnow, with the help of a £60,000 government grant, but it struggled to find an audience and she had difficulties retaining key staff. She is a co-founder of Future News Innovation, of which she will remain the director.

In June 2020, it was announced that Sheffield, who had been a columnist on the Evening Standard since 2018, would succeed George Osborne as editor on 1 July, when Osborne became editor-in-chief. She left the post in October 2021, although she will continue to write a column for the newspaper.

In 2022, Sheffield became a regular panellist on The News Desk with Tom Newton Dunn, and guest co-hosted Piers Morgan Uncensored, on TalkTV.

== Personal life ==
Sheffield moved to London as a teenager. In 2002, she married then actor Tom Mullion. The couple have two sons. Mullion is a former actor, a co-founder of the bowling chain All Star Lanes, and a co-founder, with Oliver Milburn and Tim Steel, of Kitty Fisher's, a restaurant in London's Shepherd Market.

In 2013, she accidentally shared a pre-wedding photo on Instagram of her sister Alice with David Cameron, then the prime minister, in the background, asleep on a bed, with a ministerial red box beside him. She had thought it would only be seen by a few friends, but it was shared and liked by thousands.

Media offices
Preceded by George Osborne	Editor of the Evening Standard; 2020–2021	Succeeded by Charlotte Ross; Acting
