= William Astor =

William Astor may refer to:

- William Backhouse Astor Sr. (1792–1875), American businessman and member of the Astor family
- William Backhouse Astor Jr. (1829–1892), American businessman and son of the above
- William Waldorf Astor (1848–1919), American-born English politician and nephew of the above
- William Astor, 3rd Viscount Astor (1907–1966), English politician and grandson of the above
- William Astor, 4th Viscount Astor (born 1951), English politician and son of the above
