= Wisteria (disambiguation) =

Wisteria is a genus of flowering plants.

Wisteria may also refer to:

- Wisteria (color), a light medium violet color equivalent to light lavender
- Wisteria (catalog), American retail catalog and store
- Wisteria (Steve Kuhn album), 2012
- Wisteria (Jimmy Raney album), 1985
- MS Wisteria, a ferry
- Water wisteria, Hygrophila difformis, an aquatic plant
- Summer wisteria, Indigofera decora, a shrub in the indigo family
- Wisteria "Wisty" Allgood, a character in the book Witch and Wizard

== See also ==
- Wistaria (disambiguation)
- Wisteria Lane, the setting of the TV series Desperate Housewives
