= The Standard (London newspaper) =

British newspaper

London Standard
- Previous Evening Standard logo

- The London Standard cover (12 February 2026)
- Type: Regional free newspaper
- Format: Tabloid
- Owners: Evgeny Lebedev (63%); Daily Mail and General Trust (24.9%); Justin Byam Shaw (7%); Geordie Greig (5%)
- Editor: Anna van Praagh (acting)
- Founded: 21 May 1827; 199 years ago
- Language: English
- Headquarters: Alphabeta, 14–18 Finsbury Square, London
- Circulation: 150,154 (as of August 2025)
- ISSN: 2041-4404
- OCLC number: 1058501423
- Website: www.standard.co.uk

The London Standard, branded online as The Standard and formerly known as the Evening Standard, is a long-established regional newspaper published weekly on Thursdays and distributed free of charge in London, England. It is printed in tabloid format and also has a digital edition for reading the print publication digitally.

The paper was launched in 1827 during the reign of George IV and was known as The Standard, for some time competing with The Times. An evening edition began in 1859 and the publication adopted the Evening Standard name several times throughout its history. During the mid-20th century, it was one of the main regional London newspapers alongside The Evening News and The Star. By 1980, the Standard had become a monopoly after the former's merger into it. It briefly faced new competition from London Daily News in 1987, and from 2006 by The London Paper. The Standard pridefully branded itself as the "voice of London".

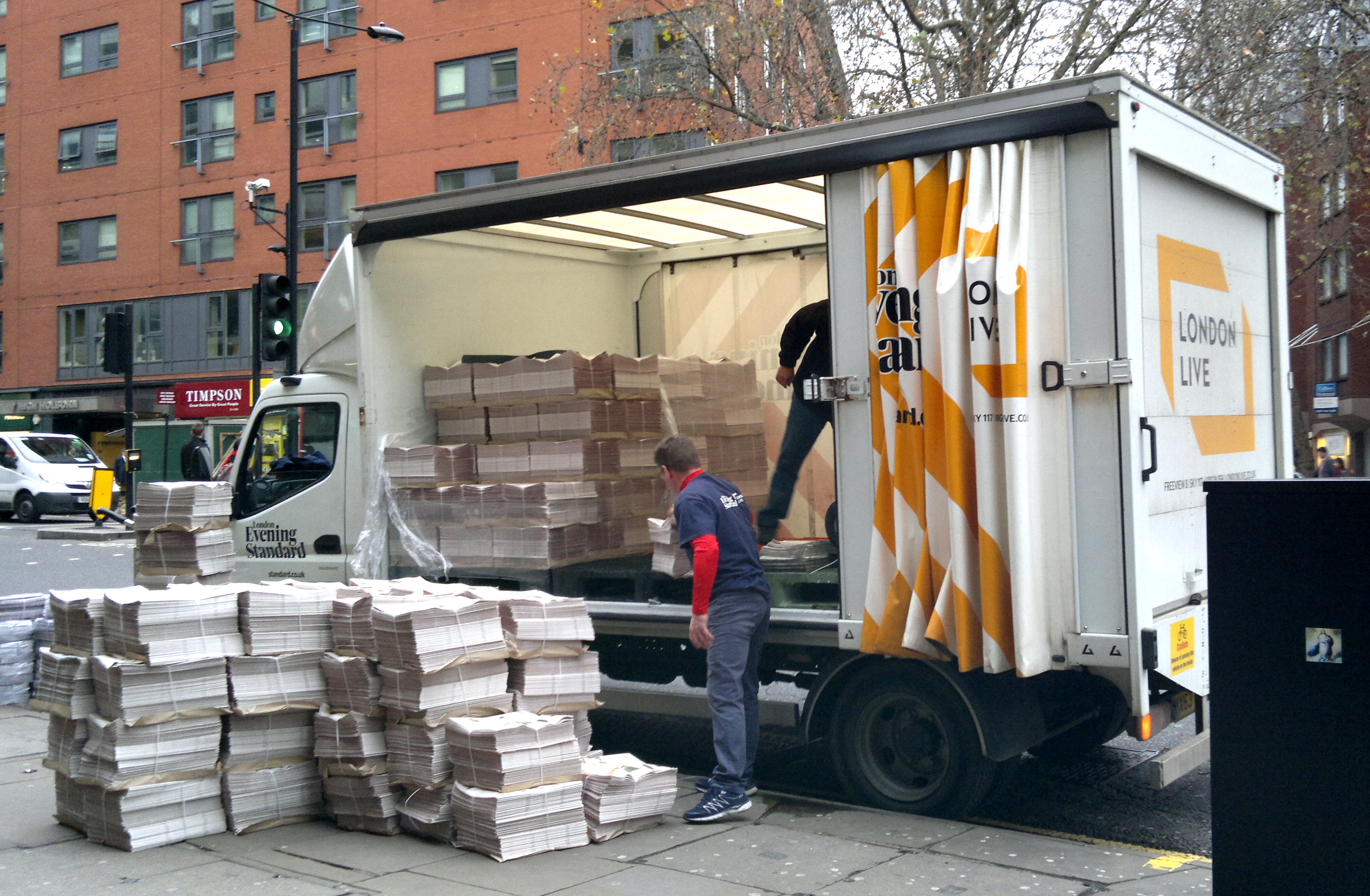
Unloading the Evening Standard at Chancery Lane Station, November 2014

In October 2009, after being bought by Russian businessman Alexander Lebedev, the paper ended a 180-year history of paid circulation and multiple editions every day, and became a free newspaper publishing a single print edition every weekday. From September 2024, the newspaper reduced print publication to once weekly, after nearly 200 years of daily publication, as it had become unprofitable, relaunching under the new name of The London Standard with a magazine-like cover.

== History ==
=== From 1827 to 1960 ===
The newspaper was founded by barrister Stanley Lees Giffard on 21 May 1827 as The Standard. The early owner of the paper was Charles Baldwin. Under the ownership of James Johnstone, The Standard became a morning paper from 29 June 1857. The Evening Standard was published from 11 June 1859. The Standard gained eminence for its detailed foreign news, notably its reporting of events of the American Civil War (1861–1865), the Austro-Prussian War of 1866, and the Franco-Prussian War of 1870, all contributing to a rise in circulation. By the end of the 19th century, the evening edition eclipsed its morning counterpart.

Both The Standard and the Evening Standard were acquired by C. Arthur Pearson in 1904. In May 1915, Edward Hulton bought the Evening Standard from Davison Dalziel. Dalziel had bought both papers in 1910, and closed The Standard, the morning paper, in 1916. Hulton introduced the gossip column Londoner's Diary, originally billed as "a column written by gentlemen for gentlemen".

In 1923, Lord Beaverbrook, owner of the Daily Express, bought Hulton's newspapers, although he sold them shortly thereafter to the Daily Mail's owner Lord Rothermere, with the exception of the Standard. It became a staunchly Conservative paper, harshly attacking Labour in 1945 in a high-profile campaign that backfired.

=== From 1960 to 2009 ===
In the 1960s, the paper was upstaged by The Evening News, which sold more than 1 million copies nightly. During the decade, the paper also began to publish the comic strip Modesty Blaise, which bolstered its sales throughout the 1970s. The Evening Standard ceased publishing on Saturdays on 30 November 1974, when it still produced six editions daily. In the 1960s, the paper's political editor Robert Carvel was granted a morning briefing by prime minister Harold Wilson and it had its own correspondents in Paris and Washington.

In 1980, Express Newspapers merged the Standard with Associated Newspapers' Evening News in a Joint Operating Agreement. The new paper was known as the New Standard until 1985, when Associated Newspapers bought out the remaining stake, turning it into The Standard. In 1987 the Evening News was briefly revived to compete with Robert Maxwell's London Daily News, but was reabsorbed into The Standard later that year, after the collapse of Maxwell's paper. In 1988 the Evening Standard included the by-line "Incorporating the 'Evening News'", which remained until the paper's sale in 2009.

The paper remained as the sole London-wide evening newspaper. In the 2000s it faced increasingly stiff competition from the free Metro newspaper, leading to the launch of the Standard Lite as a second and cheaper publication. Further competition came in 2006 when The London Paper launched, leading to Associated Newspapers to rename the Standard Lite to London Lite and become a freesheet as well.

=== From 2009 to 2024 ===
On 21 January 2009, the Russian businessman and former KGB agent Alexander Lebedev and his son Evgeny Lebedev, who in 2010 went on to own The Independent, agreed to acquire control of the Evening Standard for £1 for 64 per cent ownership. A few years earlier, 12 per cent of the paper had been sold to Justin Shaw and Geordie Greig. Associated Newspapers retained the remaining 24 per cent.

==== Relaunch ====
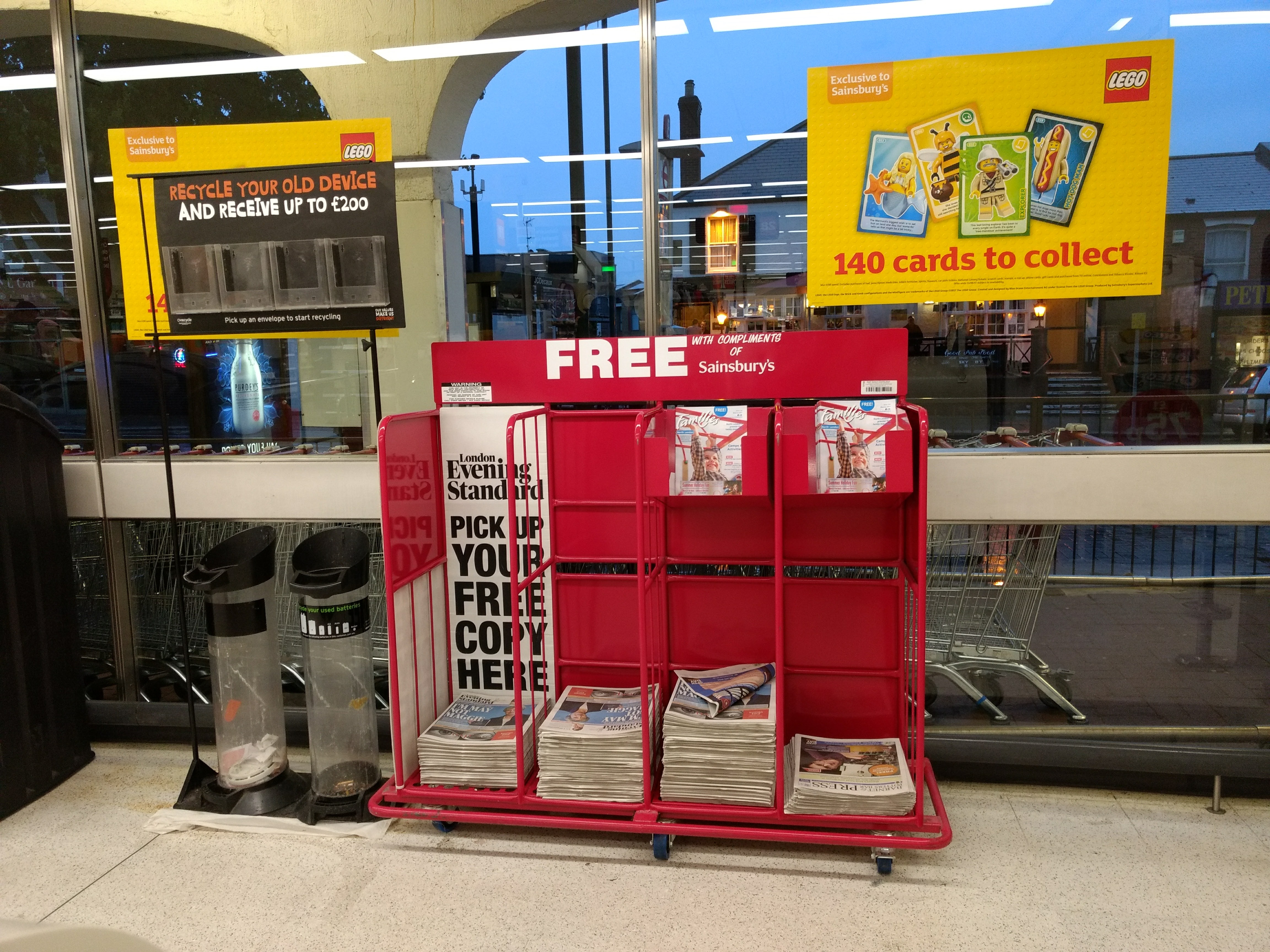
London Evening Standard dispensers at Sainsbury's supermarket, 2017

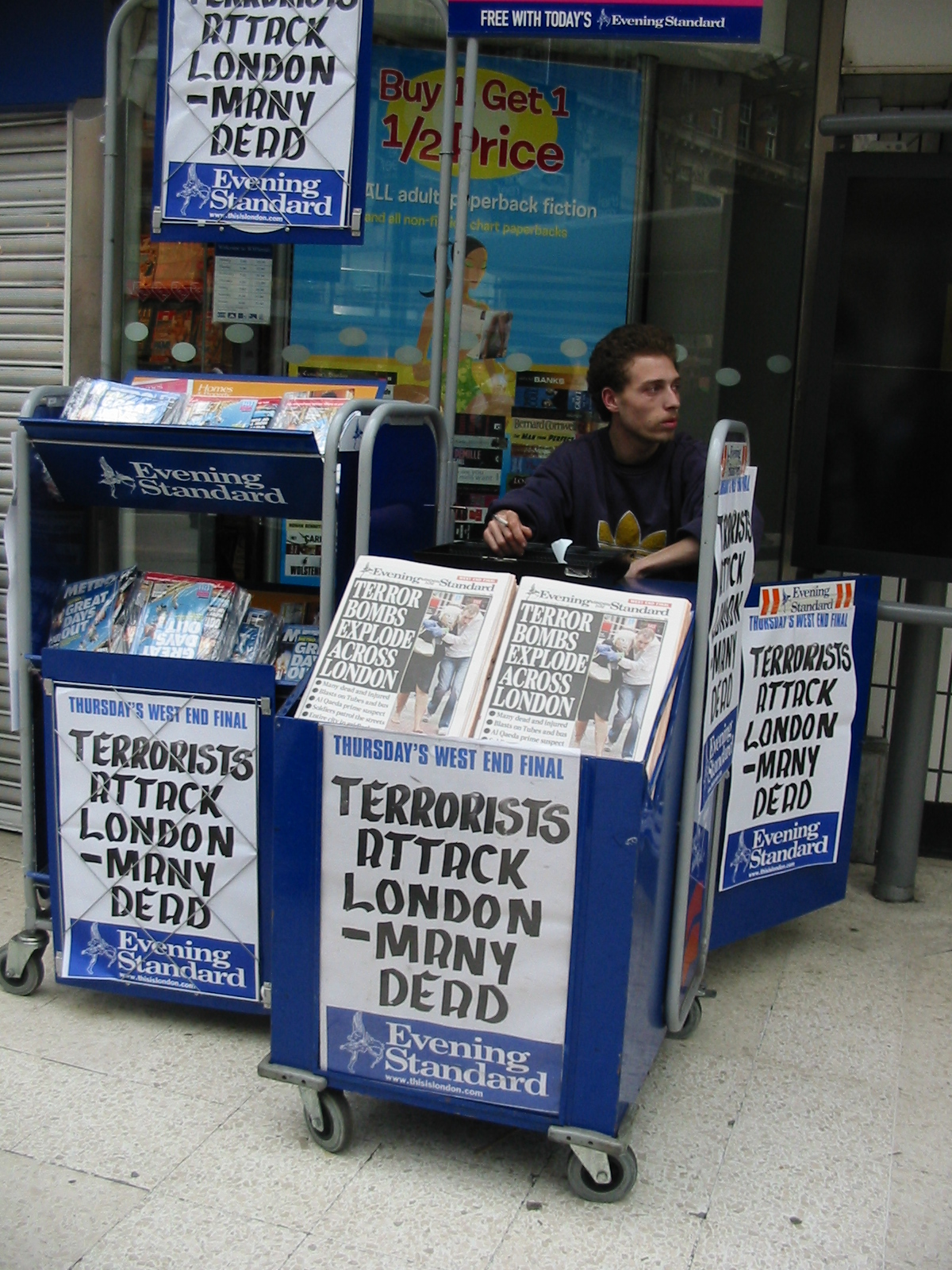
Headlines of the Evening Standard on the day of London bombing on 7 July 2005, at Waterloo station

In May 2009, the newspaper launched a series of poster ads, each of which prominently featured the word "Sorry" in the paper's then-masthead font. These ads offered various apologies for past editorial approaches, such as "Sorry for losing touch". None of the posters mentioned the Evening Standard by name, although they featured the paper's Eros logo. Ex-editor Veronica Wadley criticised the "Pravda-style" campaign saying it humiliated the paper's staff and insulted its readers.

The campaign was designed by McCann Erickson. Also in May 2009, the paper relaunched as the London Evening Standard with a new layout and masthead, marking the occasion by giving away 650,000 free copies on the day, and refreshed its sports coverage.

==== Freesheet ====
After a long history of paid circulation, on 12 October 2009, the Standard became a free newspaper, with free circulation of 700,000, limited to central London. In February 2010, a paid-for circulation version became available in suburban areas of London for 20p (although many places sell it for 50p). The newspaper won the "Media Brand of the Year" and the "Grand Prix Gold" awards at the Media Week awards in October 2010. The judges said: "[The Standard has] quite simply ... stunned the market. Not just for the act of going free, but because editorial quality has been maintained, circulation has almost trebled and advertisers have responded favourably. Here is a media brand restored to health." The Standard also won the daily newspaper of the year award at the London Press Club Awards in May 2011.

In November 2009, it was announced that the London Evening Standard would drop its morning "News Extra" edition from 4 January 2010. From then on, the first edition was the "West End Final", available from 2 pm. One edition of 600,000 copies would be printed starting at 12:30 pm, ending 5.30 am starts for journalists and the previous deadline of 7 am for the first edition. Twenty people were expected to lose their jobs as a result.

There were often considerable changes between editions in the front-page lead and the following news pages, including the Londoner's Diary, though features and reviews stayed the same. In January 2010, circulation was increased to 900,000.

The Evening Standard also launched a mobile app with US app developer Handmark in May 2010. The range of apps was updated in 2015.

==== 2018 redesign ====
In March 2018, editor George Osborne initiated a redesign of the paper, which included dropping the "London" from its title in a signal of the paper's ambition to have greater national and international influence. The paper also introduced more colourful "signposting" for different sections such as news, comment, and business, as it was noted by Osborne that it had not been "easy" to find them inside the paper previously. The masthead was also redesigned with a new font, and emojis were added to the paper's five-day weather forecast.

In May 2018, James Cusick of openDemocracy alleged the newspaper had been providing favourable news coverage to companies, including Uber and Google, in exchange for financial sponsorship.

Evening Standard cover on 19 March 2020 using its final design before the rebranding

In June 2019, the Evening Standard announced job cuts. By the end of 2019, the company reported a pre-tax loss of £13.6 million. In August 2020, the paper announced a further 115 job cuts in order to save the company.

=== 2024 to present ===
==== Redundancies ====
Before the COVID-19 pandemic that started in 2020, the Evening Standard's daily circulation was about 800,000. By mid-2024, it had dropped below 300,000. The newspaper lost nearly £20 million in 2023.

On 29 May 2024, the newspaper announced that it would go from a daily to weekly print publication as it was unprofitable, and become a digital first publication. The newspaper had dropped from about 70 to 30 pages in the preceding decade. The change was made by Lebedev under pressure by Sultan Muhammad Abuljadayel, who has owned a 30% stake in the Evening Standard's parent company since 2018. On 14 June 2024, the newspaper announced it would eliminate 150 jobs. The redundancies included 70 editorial workers (out of 120), 40 office workers and 45 workers from the paper's printing and distribution operations at Broxbourne. Lebedev proposed to make statutory minimum payments plus £1,000, capped at £21,000, to those made redundant.

On 29 July 2024, the last Friday and Monday editions had been printed, and on Thursday 19 September 2024 the last daily format edition was printed.

==== Move to weekly printing ====
The larger, weekly edition was first published on Thursdays from 26 September 2024 under the new name of The London Standard. The relaunch has been described as difficult and had been met with some criticism in that the editorial output gravitated towards arts and culture and less reporting on London news.

It was revealed by Press Gazette on 20 January 2026 that the The Independent website will take over the running of the Standard website on 1 March, with several staff from the Standard set to transfer to the Independent. The Standard newspaper will remain in print, with 25 staff members out of 75 retained to work on the newspaper, with the rest either transferring to the Independent or leaving the business. According to The Daily Telegraph in February, the transfer to The Independent has been delayed following several board resignations.

== Editorial style ==
From July 2020 to October 2021, the newspaper's editor was Emily Sheffield, sister of Samantha Cameron, who took over from the former Chancellor of the Exchequer George Osborne, who became editor-in-chief. As editor he had replaced Sarah Sands who, in turn, had replaced Geordie Greig following his departure to The Mail on Sunday in March 2012. Veronica Wadley was the newspaper's editor between 2002 and 2009. Max Hastings was editor from 1996 until he retired in 2002.

The Evening Standard, a regional newspaper, emphasises London-centred news (especially in its features pages), covering building developments, property prices, traffic schemes, politics, the congestion charge and, in the Londoner's Diary page, gossip on the social scene, and also covers significant national and international news. It also occasionally runs campaigns on London issues that national newspapers do not cover in detail.

It has a tradition of providing arts coverage. Its best known former art critic, Brian Sewell, was known for his acerbic view of conceptual art, Britart and the Turner Prize and his views attracted controversy and criticism in the art world. He has been described as "Britain's most famous and controversial art critic".

=== Political stance ===
During the 2008 London mayoral election, the newspaper and particularly the correspondent Andrew Gilligan published articles in support of the Conservative candidate Boris Johnson, including frequent front-page headlines condemning Labour opponent Ken Livingstone. This included the headline "Suicide bomb backer runs Ken's campaign". On 5 May 2010, the newspaper stated in an editorial that, having supported Labour under Tony Blair, the newspaper would be supporting David Cameron and the Conservatives in the 2010 general election, saying that "the Conservatives are ready for power: they look like a government in waiting". On 5 May 2015, an editorial stated that the newspaper would again be supporting Cameron and the Conservatives in the 2015 general election, saying that the Conservatives have "shown themselves to be good for London". The newspaper also said "there may be good tactical reasons to vote Liberal Democrat".

The Media Reform Coalition (MRC) through its chair Justin Schlosberg and Goldsmiths, University of London considered that in the 2016 London mayoral election, the Evening Standard favoured the Conservative Party. There were almost twice as many positive headlines about the Conservative candidate, Zac Goldsmith, as for his Labour rival, Sadiq Khan, with stories exhibiting the strongest bias against Khan also being the most prominent.

In the 2017 and 2019 United Kingdom general elections, the Evening Standard endorsed the Conservative Party. During the 2019 Conservative leadership election, the Evening Standard endorsed Johnson. During the 2020 Labour leadership election, the Evening Standard endorsed Keir Starmer to become Labour leader and consequently Leader of the Opposition. The Evening Standard endorsed Liz Truss in the July–September 2022 Conservative Party leadership election. For the 2024 London mayoral election, the Evening Standard endorsed Khan for Mayor of London. The Evening Standard later endorsed the Labour Party in the 2024 general election.

== Freesheet and supplements ==
On 14 December 2004, Associated Newspapers launched a Monday–Friday freesheet edition of the Evening Standard called Standard Lite to help boost circulation. This edition had 48 pages, compared with about 80 in the main paper, which also had a supplement on most days.

In August 2006, the freesheet was relaunched as London Lite. It was designed to be especially attractive to younger female readers and featured a wide range of lifestyle articles, but less news and business news than the main paper. It was initially available only between 11:30 a.m. and 2:30 p.m. at Evening Standard vendors and in the central area, but later became available in the evening from its street distributors. With the sale of the Evening Standard, but not the London Lite, to Alexander Lebedev on 21 January 2009, the ownership link between the Standard and the Lite was broken.

On Fridays, the newspaper included a free glossy lifestyle magazine, ES (launched as the Evening Standard Magazine in 2009,) and the circulation was increased to 350,000 in September 2014. This has moved from more general articles to concentrate on glamour, with features on the rich, powerful and famous. On Wednesdays, some areas offer a free copy of the Homes & Property supplement, edited by Janice Morley, which includes London property listings and articles from lifestyle journalists including Barbara Chandler, Katie Law, and Alison Cork.

A free entertainment guide supplement Metro Life, previously called Hot Tickets, was published on Thursdays from September 2002 to September 2005. This was a "what's-on" guide with listings of cinemas and theatres in and around London.

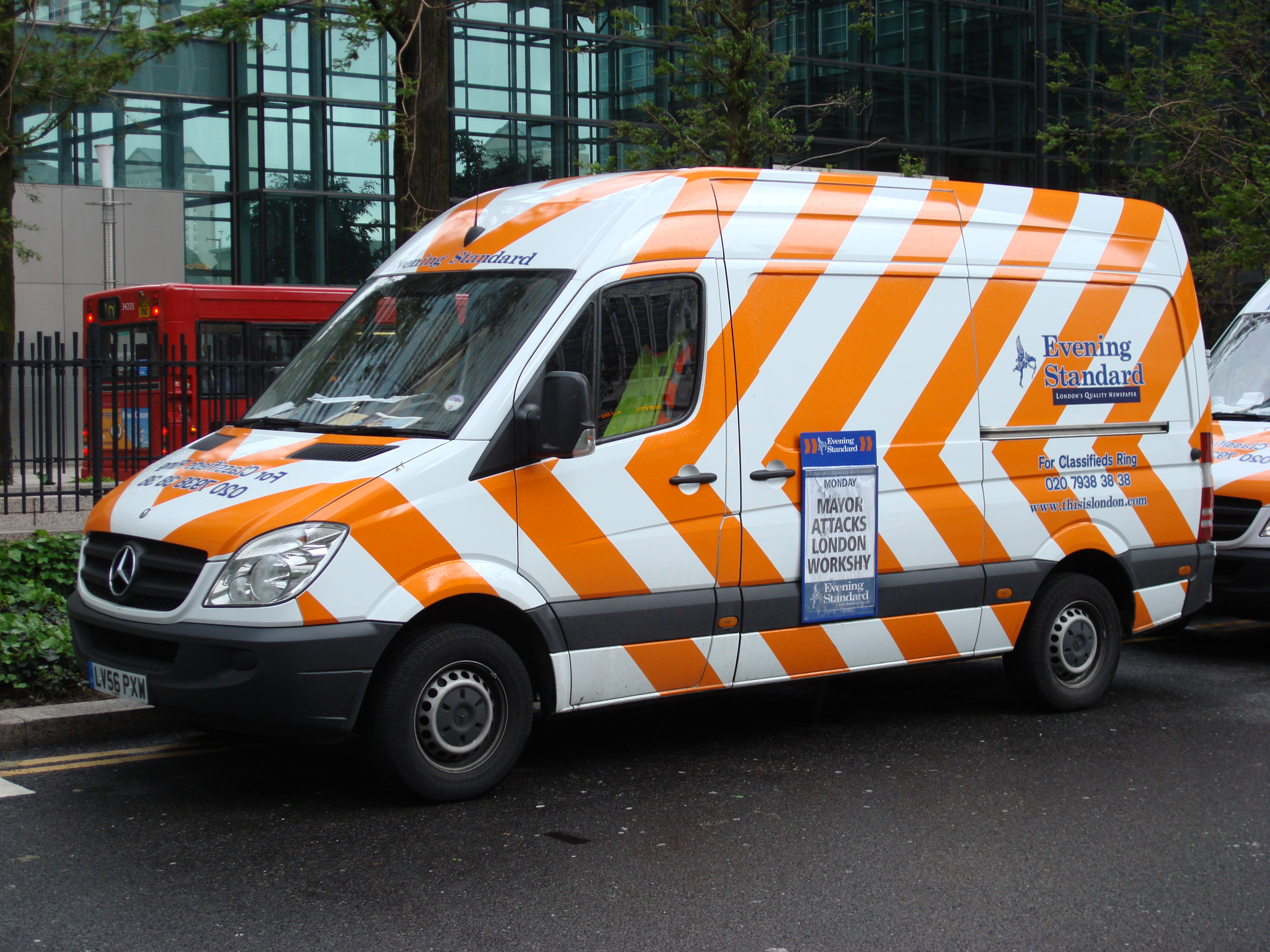
The Evening Standard has a fleet of delivery vans painted in a distinctive orange and white livery.

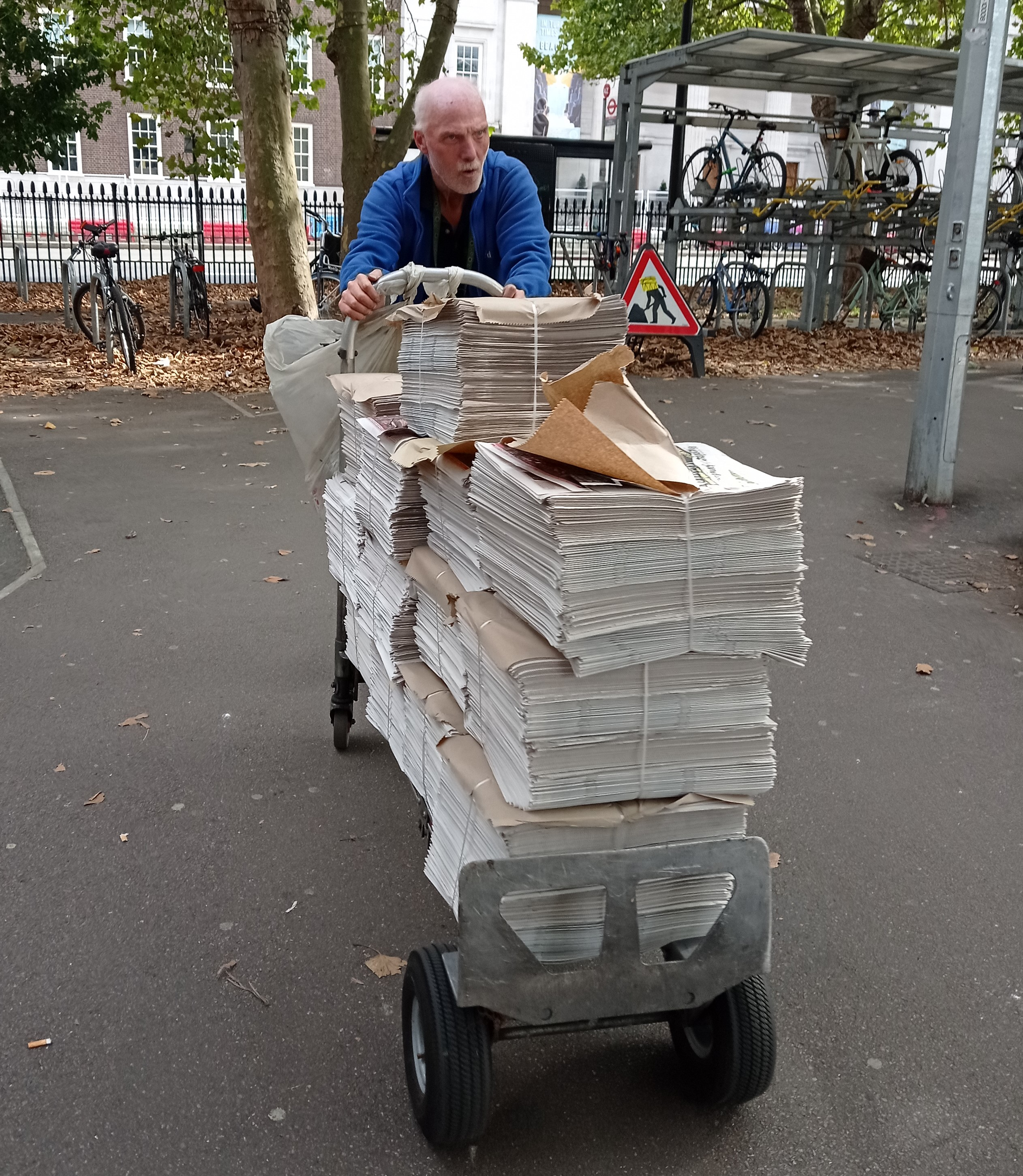
Delivering the Evening Standard to Euston Station, September 2022

== Editors ==
Editors, with their year of appointment, have been:

- 1827: Stanley Lees Giffard
- 1846: Robert Knox
- 1857: Thomas Hamber (The Standard)
- 1860: Charles Williams
- 1863: Thomas Hamber
- 1870: James Johnstone Jr. and John Gorst
- 1876: W. H. Mudford
- 1899: Byron Curtis
- 1906: William Woodward
- 1912: James A. Kilpatrick
- 1914: D. M. Sutherland
- 1916: Arthur Mann
- 1920: D. Phillips
- 1923: E. Raymond Thompson
- 1928: George Gilliat
- 1933: Percy Cudlipp
- 1937: Reginald John Tanner Thompson
- 1938: Frank Owen
- 1942: Michael Foot
- 1943: Sydney Elliott
- 1945: Bert Gunn
- 1952: Percy Elland
- 1959: Charles Wintour
- 1976: Simon Jenkins
- 1978: Charles Wintour
- 1980: Louis Kirby
- 1986: John Leese
- 1991: Paul Dacre
- 1992: Stewart Steven
- 1996: Max Hastings
- 2002: Veronica Wadley
- 2009: Geordie Greig
- 2012: Sarah Sands
- 2017: George Osborne
- 2020: Emily Sheffield
- 2021: Charlotte Ross (acting)
- 2022: Jack Lefley (acting)
- 2023: Dylan Jones
- 2024: Anna van Praagh (acting)

== Journalists ==
- George Orwell, author of Nineteen Eighty-Four and Animal Farm
- John Lahr, biographer and theatre critic
- Alexander Walker, film critic
- McKenzie Porter , film critic (1930s)
- John Preston, former arts editor
- Julie Burchill, author
- Jack Massarik, jazz critic
