= Annabel Astor, Viscountess Astor =

English socialite and jewellery designer (born 1948)

The Right Honourable The Viscountess Astor
- Born: Annabel Lucy Veronica Jones; 14 March 1948 (age 78); Woolwich, London, England
- Occupations: Jewellery designer, businesswoman
- Spouses: Reginald Sheffield (m. 1969; div. 1974); William Astor, 4th Viscount Astor (m. 1976)
- Children: 5, including Samantha Cameron and Emily Sheffield

Annabel Lucy Veronica Astor, Viscountess Astor (née Jones, formerly Sheffield; born 14 August 1948), is an English businesswoman and socialite who is a founder and former CEO of OKA, a home furnishings design company. Before co-founding OKA, she was the owner and designer of the Annabel Jones jewellery business in London.

Her daughter Samantha is married to David Cameron, formerly British prime minister, Conservative Party leader and president of Alzheimer's Research UK.

== Background ==
She is the daughter of Timothy Angus Jones and his wife, Patricia David Pandora Clifford. She was educated at Lycée Français de Londres. Her mother was married secondly in 1961 to the Hon. Michael Langhorne Astor, based in London. Her paternal grandparents were Sir Roderick Jones, the Chairman of Reuters, and the novelist Enid Bagnold. Her mother Patricia was the daughter of the Hon. Sir Bede Edmund Hugh Clifford, GCMG, CB (son of William Hugh Clifford, 10th Baron Clifford of Chudleigh, a descendant of King Charles II of England) by his wife Alice Devin Gundry.

== Marriages ==
She married Reginald Sheffield (later Sir Reginald Sheffield, 8th Baronet) on 11 November 1969, and they were divorced in 1974. They have two daughters:

- Samantha Gwendoline Sheffield (born 18 April 1971), who married David Cameron on 1 June 1996. They have four children.
- Emily Julia Sheffield (born 1973), who married Tom Mullion in 2002. They have two sons.

She married William Astor, 4th Viscount Astor, on 14 January 1976. They have three children:

- The Honourable Flora Katherine Astor (7 June 1976), who married Alexander Rycroft in September 2006 and had three children.
- The Honourable William Waldorf "Will" Astor (18 January 1979), who married Lohralee Stutz on 5 September 2009 and had four children.
- The Honourable James Jacob Astor (born 1981), who married Victoria Hargreaves on 13 September 2014 and had three children.
