= W. H. Mudford =

British newspaper editor (1839–1916)

William Heseltine Mudford (1 March 1839 – 18 October 1916), known as W. H. Mudford, was a British newspaper editor.

== Biography ==
The son of William Mudford, a newspaper editor, W. H. Mudford went to work for The Standard newspaper in London around 1860. He rose to become business manager in 1873, and editor in 1876: and in owner James Johnstone's will of 1878 his tenure as editor with managerial control was made permanent, until his death or resignation. He made The Standard the second best-selling morning newspaper, after The Times, printing 250,000 copies per day by the mid-1880s. However, he was reluctant to update the paper's style, and during the 1890s it lost sales to new papers such as the Daily Mail. He resigned in 1899, and retired to Wimbledon Common.

Media offices
Preceded by Thomas Hamber	Editor of The Standard; 1871–1899	Succeeded by Byron Curtis
