= Charlotte Ross (journalist) =

British journalist

Charlotte Ross is a British journalist, and was acting editor of the Evening Standard from October 2021 until October 2022. She followed Emily Sheffield as only the fourth woman to cover this job in the Kensington newsroom of the London free-sheet with a circulation of 493,000. She joined the Evening Standard in 2006 after holding various executive roles in newspapers and magazines, becoming its deputy editor in 2017 and publisher in 2020 to combine editorial and commercial strategy.

== Early life ==
Ross earned an MA in English Language and Literature from the University of Glasgow. From 1992 to 1994, she was involved with the feminist magazine Harpies and Quines, founded by a Glasgow-based collective.

== Career ==
In 1998, Ross acquired her newspaper skills by joining the launch team for the broadsheet Sunday Herald in Scotland. She then had executive roles at The Scotsman 2000, The Independent 2004, and at She magazine 2004.

After joining the Standard in 2006 on features, Ross moved on to executive editor 2010, and joint deputy editor 2012, during which she edited ES Magazine. As deputy editor 2020 she was also head of digital content, pivoting the business to digital first.

Ross has been involved in many successful campaigns and projects including Get London Reading and the paper's annual Progress 1000 list. At a live debate in 2018 discussing equal opportunities in the media and hosted by the London Press Club, she maintained that “right now is a very good time to be a woman in journalism”. However, during 2019 and 2020 when the Evening Standard reported a pre-tax loss, it announced more than 100 job cuts in order to save the company.

In November 2022, Ross became deputy editor, features & lifestyle, at The Telegraph.

Media offices
Preceded by Emily Sheffield	Editor of the Evening Standard; Acting; 2021–2022	Succeeded by Jack Lefley; Acting
