= Hyde Park Gate =

Central London street known for Churchill's residence

Coordinates: 51°30′1.3″N 0°10′57.8″W

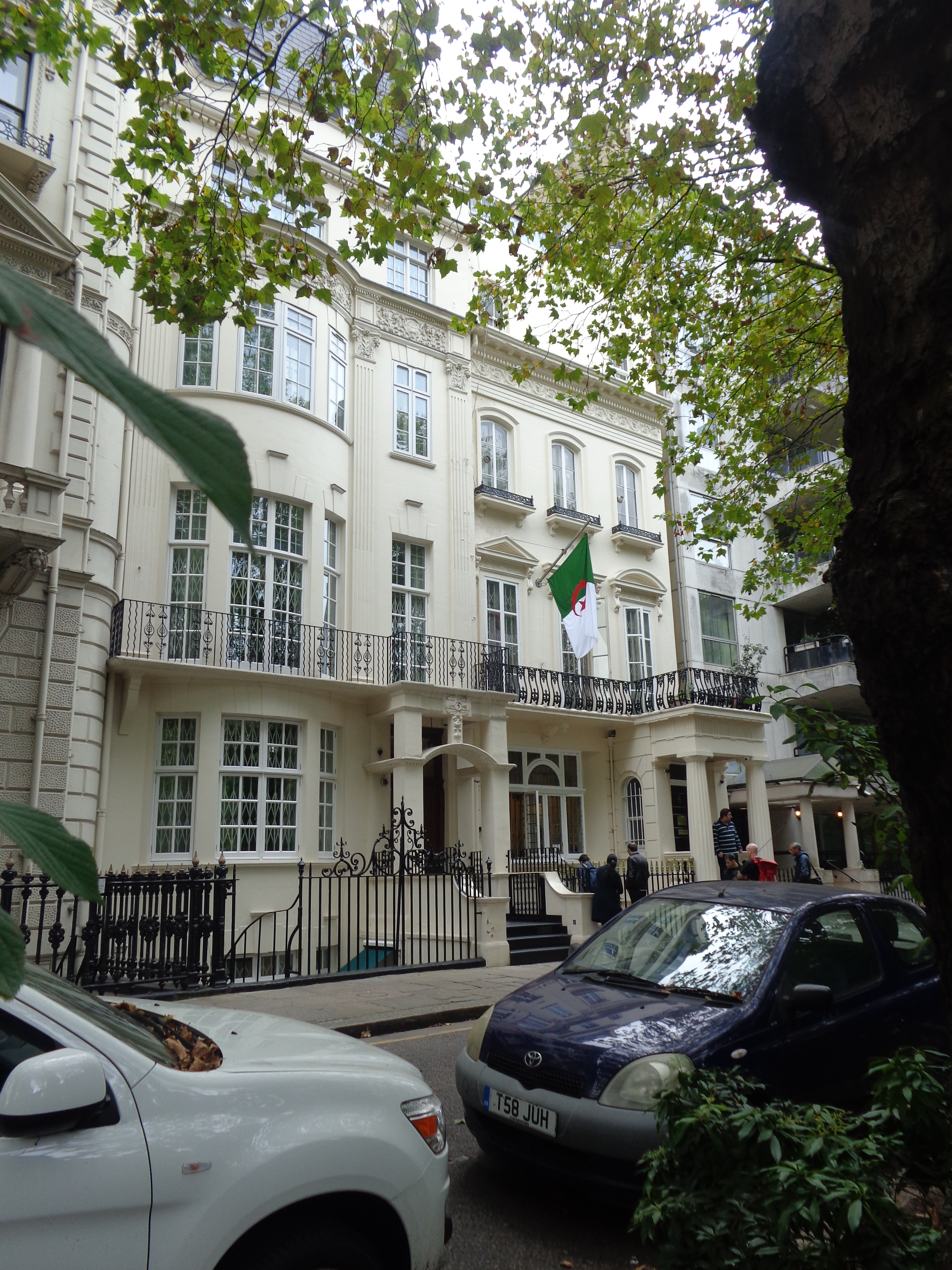
Algerian consulate, 8 Hyde Park Gate, London, September 2014

Hyde Park Gate is a street in Central London, England, which applies to two parallel roads in Kensington on the southern boundary of Kensington Gardens. These two roads run south, perpendicular to Kensington Road, but the name Hyde Park Gate also applies to the houses on the south side of that road between Queen's Gate and De Vere Gardens.

It is known for being a former residence and the death place of Sir Winston Churchill.

The numbering system was changed in 1884, e.g. Number 11 became 20.

== Notable residents ==
Number 6

- The Consular Section of the Embassy of Algeria

Number 9

- Robert Baden-Powell, 1st Baron Baden-Powell, founder of the scouting movement

Number 14

- Margaret Kennedy, novelist

Number 16

- The Embassy of Estonia

Number 17

- Victoria Claflin Woodhull Martin, first woman to run for the US presidency

Number 18

- Sir Jacob Epstein, sculptor and painter

Number 19

- Arthur Stockdale Cope, artist member of the Royal Academy

Number 22

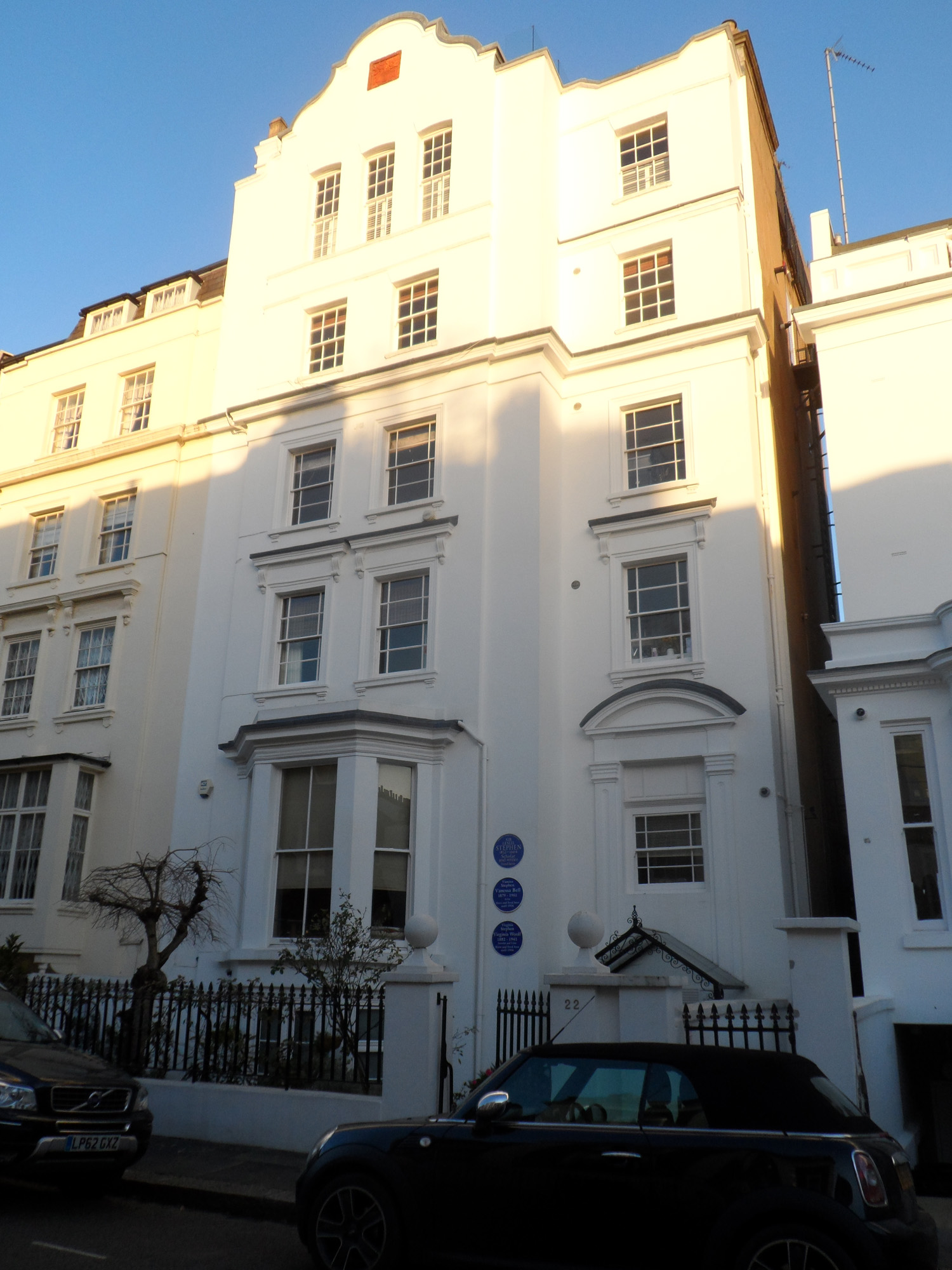
22 Hyde Park Gate, 2015

- Vanessa Bell, painter
- Virginia Woolf, writer
- Sir Leslie Stephen, scholar and writer (previously at 20, born at 42)
- Julia Stephen, philanthropist, writer, artist's model

Number 24

- Nigel Lawson, Baron Lawson of Blaby, politician and Chancellor of The Exchequer (1983–1989)
- Nigella Lawson, food writer, journalist and broadcaster

Number 28

- Sir Winston Churchill, former prime minister, who died there
- Donatella Flick, socialite, lived there in the 1990s
- Ceawlin Thynn, 8th Marquess of Bath acquired the property in 2023

Number 29

- Sir Roderick Jones, director of Reuters

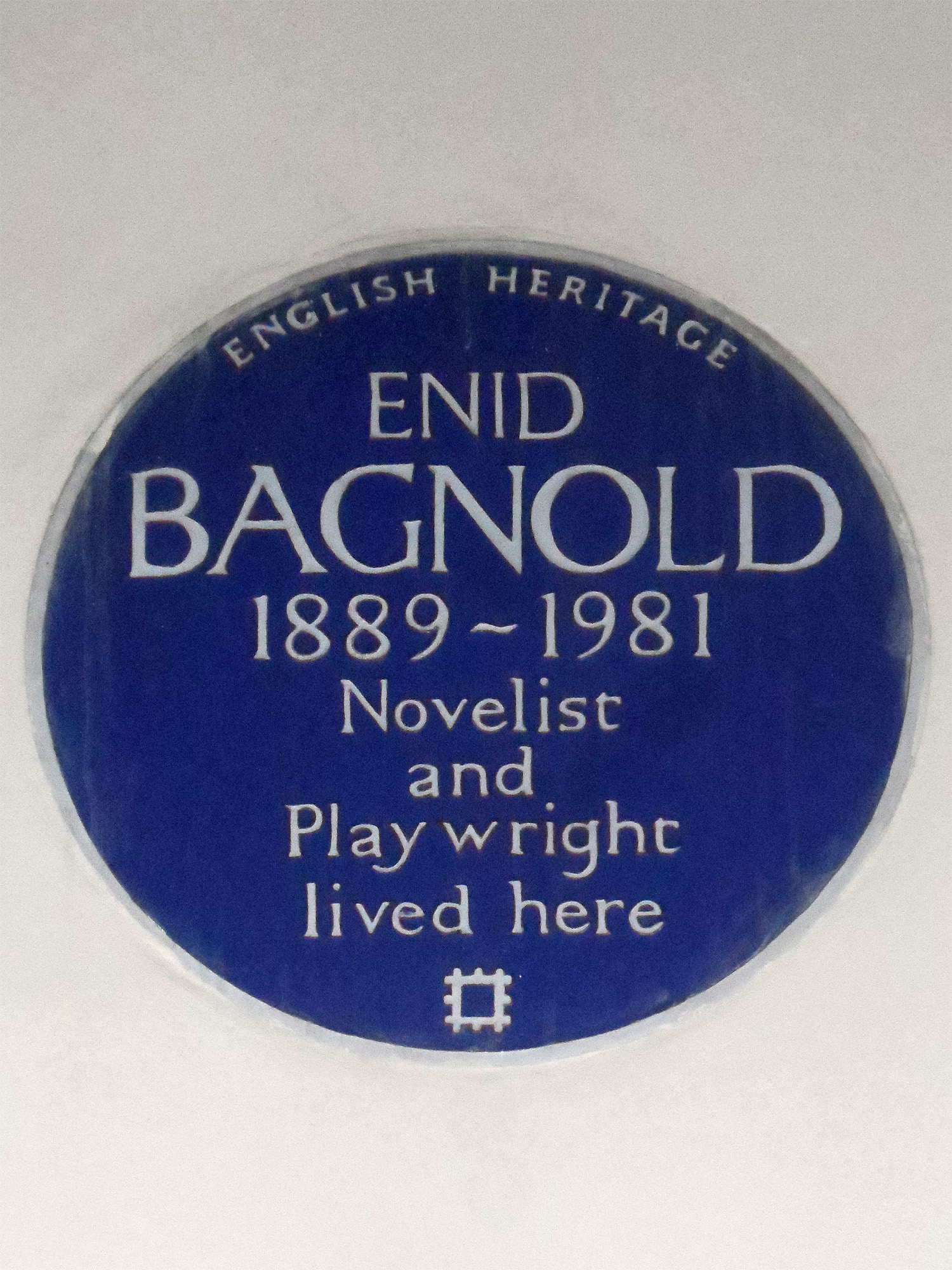
Blue plaque honouring Enid Bagnold on 29 Hyde Park Gate

- Enid Bagnold, novelist and playwright

Number 34

- The High Commission of Fiji

Number 38

- The Embassy of the Netherlands

=== Number 42 ===
- Ivan Morris, orientalist, and his wife Nobuko (later Lady Albery) resided there in the 1960s

Number 45 (Stoke Lodge)

- Residence of the High Commissioners of Australia, since 1950

== Bibliography ==
- Sheppard, F H W, ed. (1975). "Survey of London, vol. 38 South Kensington Museums Area: Hyde Park Gate and Kensington Gate". British History Online. London: Institute of Historical Research. pp. 26–38.
