= All Hallows' Church, Sutton-on-the-Forest =

Church in North Yorkshire, England

Coordinates: 54°04′30″N 1°06′39″W

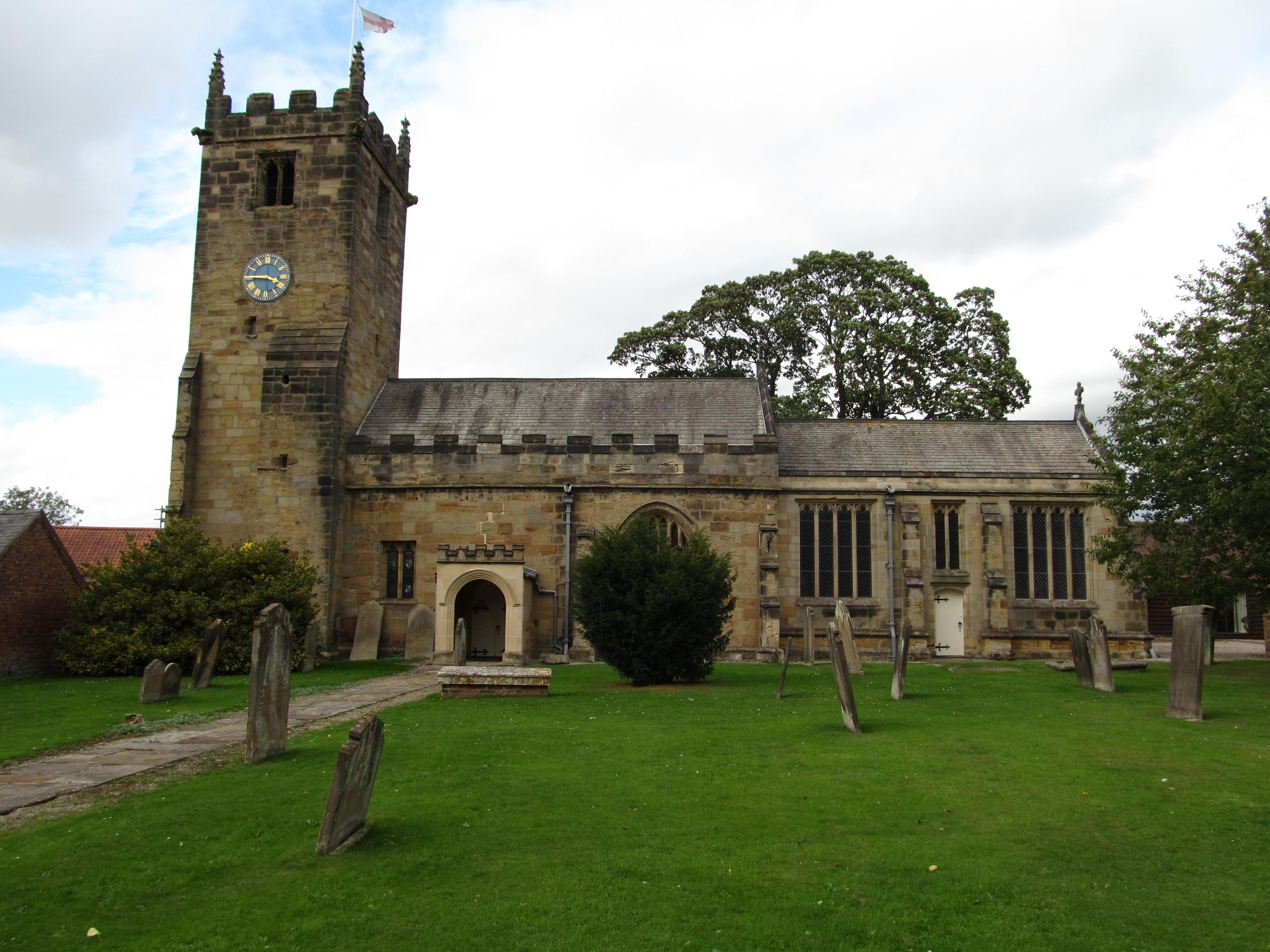
The church, in 2018

All Hallows' Church is the parish church of Sutton-on-the-Forest, a village in North Yorkshire, in England.

The church was probably built in the 14th century, largely of wood, but with a stone chancel. The external walls were rebuilt in stone in the early 15th century, from which period the south wall of the nave survives. The tower was added late in the century. From 1741 to 1760, the vicar was Laurence Sterne. In 1876, the majority of the church was demolished, including the surviving wooden structure. The Victoria County History states that "the rebuilding is regrettable, as the ancient structure was unique in this part of the country". The church was grade II listed in 1960.

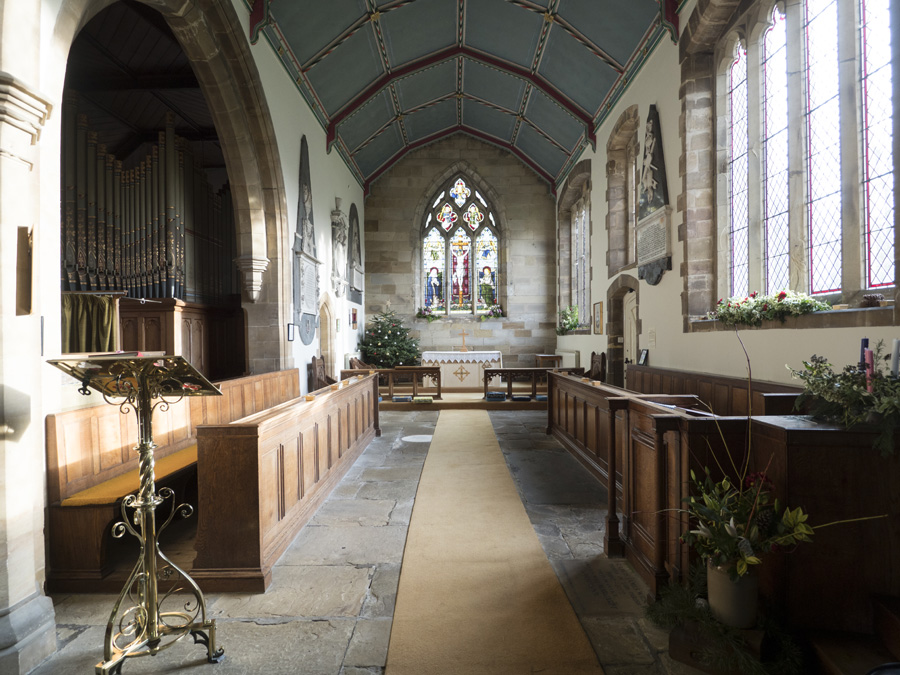
The chancel

The church is built of stone with a slate roof, and consists of a nave, a north aisle, a south porch, a chancel with a north vestry and chapel, and a west tower. The tower has three stages, angle buttresses, a southeast stair turret, a south clock face, two-light bell openings, a moulded string course, and an embattled parapet with corner gargoyles and crocketed pinnacles. The porch and the nave also have embattled parapets, and the porch has a moulded four-centred arched entrance. Inside, there is a 15th-century stoup and piscina, several 18th-century memorials, a late-17th century altar table, a hexagonal 18th-century oak pulpit, and an alms box dating from 1673.

== See also ==
- Listed buildings in Sutton-on-the-Forest
