= Roderick Jones (journalist) =

British journalist (1877–1962)

Sir Roderick Jones KBE
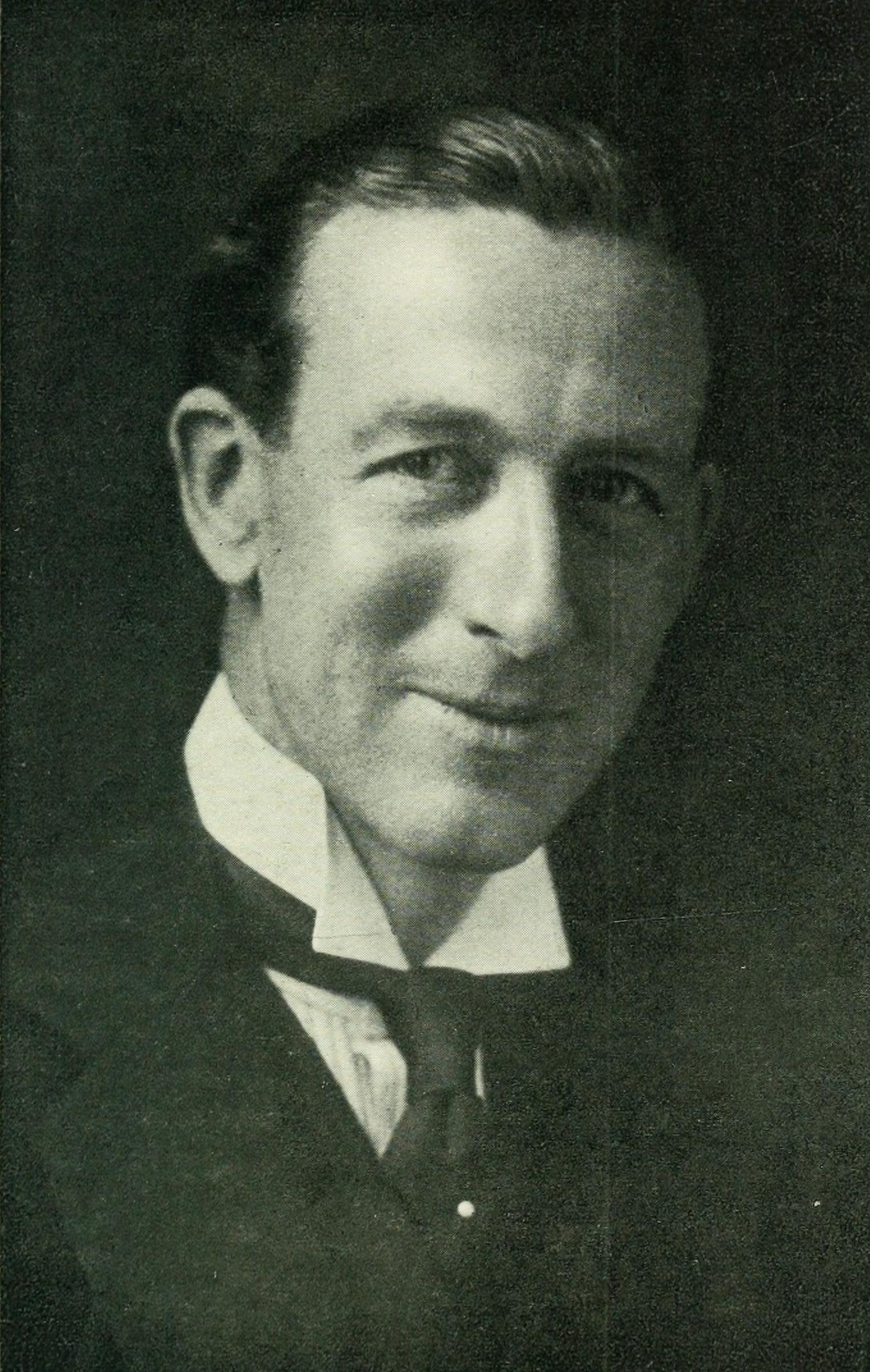
- Born: George Roderick Jones; 21 October 1877; Dukinfield, Cheshire, England
- Died: 23 January 1962 (aged 84); 29, Hyde Park Gate, Westminster, England
- Occupations: Journalist, later head of Reuters
- Spouses: Enid Bagnold (m. 1920)
- Children: 4
- Relatives: Samantha Cameron (great-granddaughter)

Sir George Roderick Jones KBE (21 October 1877 – 23 January 1962) was a British journalist and news agency manager, who for most of his career worked for Reuters. From 1916, he was a significant shareholder in the company.

== Life ==
Jones was born in Dukinfield, Cheshire, the only son of Roderick Patrick Jones, a Manchester hat salesman, by his marriage to Christina Drennan Gibb. His parents had been married at St Saviour's church, Manchester, on 13 September 1877, the month before his birth. His father was then a salesman, and his grandfather, John Jones, a butcher.

In 1894, Jones took up an invitation to join an aunt in Pretoria, then in the South African Republic. In 1895, he took a job as sub-editor on the Pretoria Press and later that year became an assistant to the Reuters correspondent in the Republic. In 1896, Jones's interview with Leander Starr Jameson in the aftermath of the Jameson Raid was networked internationally. In 1905, he became general manager of the Reuters office for British South Africa.

In April 1915, during the First World War, the Reuters general manager in London, Baron Herbert de Reuter, killed himself a few days after his wife had died, and with the company in financial difficulties. In October 1915, Jones was appointed as general manager. In 1916, he and the company chairman, Mark Napier, who was himself a financier, bought the company, with money being advanced to Jones by Sir Starr Jameson, chairman of the British South Africa Company. During the rest of the War, Reuters followed a carefully patriotic line, so much so that Jones was accused of being the British government's head of propaganda. He was knighted in the 1918 New Year Honours, in recognition of his services to journalism. In 1923, Reuters became the first news agency to use radio for sending news to its subscribers.

Jones became chairman of Reuters as well as general manager and retired from those posts in 1941. The company was restructured, so that its ownership was transferred to the newspapers subscribing to it. In 1951, Hodder & Stoughton published Jones's autobiography, A Life in Reuters.

Jones had a house at 29 Hyde Park Gate, Westminster, where he died on 23 January 1962, and he was buried at Rottingdean, where he also had a home, North End House, previously owned by the artist Edward Burne-Jones. An obituary in The Times said he had been one of only two or three leading figures in the world of news. He left an estate valued at £38,042, and probate was granted on 14 May to his daughter Laurian, Comtesse d’Harcourt, wife of Comte Anne-Pierre d’Harcourt.

== Family ==
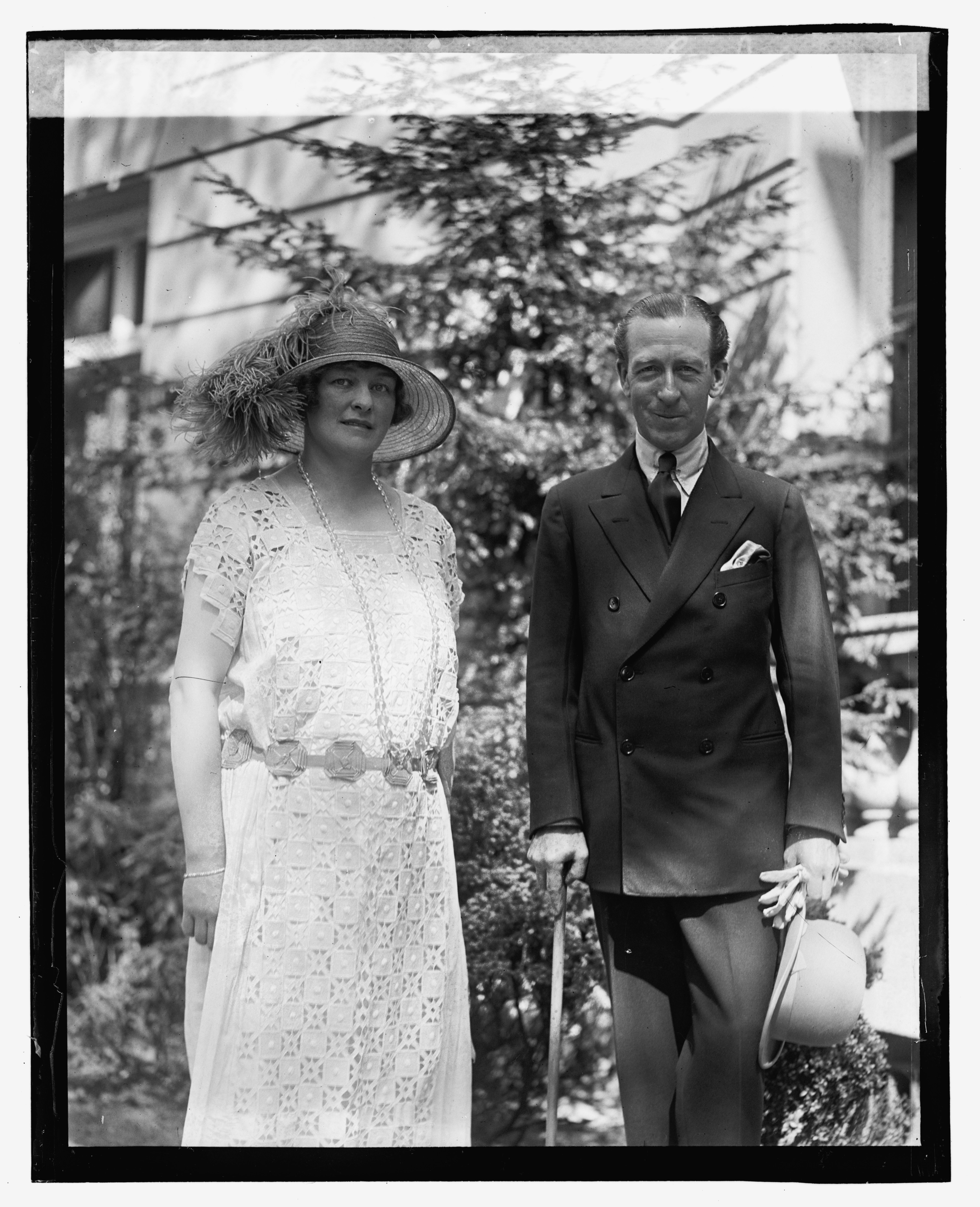
Enid Bagnold (also known by her married named Lady Jones) and Sir Roderick Jones.

In 1920, Jones married the author Enid Bagnold, and they had four children. Their only daughter, Laurian, was born in 1921, and was married first, from 1952 to 1955, to Rowland Winn, and second to Anne-Pierre d’Harcourt, the son of Robert d'Harcourt. A son, Timothy Angus Jones, was born in 1924 and later married Patricia David Pandora Clifford, daughter of Sir Bede Clifford, becoming the father of Annabel Astor, who is the mother of Samantha Cameron. A second son, Richard Bagnold Jones, was born in 1926 and became a writer on narrow-gauge railways; A third son, Dominick, was born in 1930. After working at Reuters, he lived on sailing ships, wrote a cookery book, and ran a small theatre. As of 2019, he was living in Cambridge, Massachusetts.
