= OKA Direct =

British luxury furniture and accessories retailer

Coordinates: 51°29′30.78″N 0°10′17.82″W

OKA
- Company type: Limited Company
- Industry: Furniture, home accessories
- Genre: Retailer
- Founded: 1999
- Founder: Annabel Astor, Sue Jones and Lucinda Waterhouse
- Headquarters: London, United Kingdom
- Key people: Annabel Astor, Sue Jones, Lucinda Waterhouse, Peter Chappelow, Octavia Morley
- Owner: Investindustrial
- Website: www.oka.com

OKA (also known as OKA Direct) is a British furniture and home accessories retailer founded in 1999 by Annabel Astor, Sue Jones, and Lucinda Waterhouse. It is owned by Investindustrial. OKA has 14 shops across the UK, and British and American websites and a catalogue business.

== History ==
OKA started as a mail-order company in 1999, before opening its first shop in 2000. Annabel Astor, her sister-in-law Sue Jones, and friend Lucinda Waterhouse sold products primarily from East Asia. The initial product range was 'rattan' for the first OKA catalogue – which was photographed in Jane Churchill and Bruce Oldfield's homes – followed by painted wooden furniture, alongside replicas of 18th-century blue and white porcelain and a range of Chinoiserie furniture.

OKA has two flagship shops in the UK: Froxfield, an 8,000 sq. ft showroom and a smaller garden room is between Hungerford and Marlborough; and London's three-floor Fulham Road, OKA's largest shop as of its opening in 2010.

In September 2011, OKA opened a concession in the department store Selfridges on Oxford Street in London, but it closed in February 2013. In May 2016, OKA opened a concession in Hoopers Department Store, Tunbridge Wells.

In 2009, OKA’s warehousing facilities moved from Berinsfield to a larger facility of over 100,000 sq. ft in Milton Park, Oxfordshire, where their head office is also based.

In May 2014, Peter Chappelow was appointed as non-executive chairman, replacing Graham Frost. In October 2014, Octavia Morley was appointed as CEO.

OKA reported a 23% rise in online sales and a 17% rise in overall profit for 2013, taking their annual turnover to £19.9m.

The company was bought by Italian investment firm Investindustrial in January 2018.

OKA made its first acquisition, US-based Wisteria, in September 2018.

In June 2024, OKA abruptly closed all of its US locations and filed for Chapter 7 bankruptcy liquidation by June 11, 2024, listing liabilities between $500,000 to $1 million.
