= Samantha Cameron =

British business executive (born 1971)

The Right Honourable The Lady Cameron of Chipping Norton
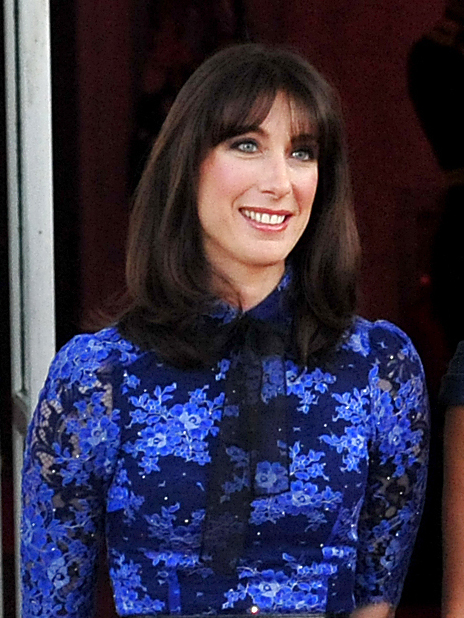
- Cameron in 2012
- Born: Samantha Gwendoline Sheffield; 18 April 1971 (age 55); London, England
- Other name: "SamCam"
- Education: St Helen and St Katharine; Marlborough College; Camberwell College of Arts; University of the West of England, Bristol
- Occupation: Businesswoman
- Known for: Spouse of the prime minister of the United Kingdom (2010–2016)
- Political party: Conservative
- Spouse: David Cameron (m. 1996)
- Children: 4
- Parents: Sir Reginald Sheffield, 8th Baronet; Annabel Jones
- Relatives: Emily Sheffield (sister)

Samantha Gwendoline Cameron, Baroness Cameron (née Sheffield; born 18 April 1971), is an English businesswoman. Until 2010, she was the creative director of Smythson of Bond Street. She is married to David Cameron, who served as Prime Minister of the United Kingdom from 2010 to 2016 and Foreign Secretary from 2023 to 2024. Cameron took on a part-time consultancy role at Smythson after her husband became prime minister.

== Early life ==
Cameron is the elder daughter of Sir Reginald Sheffield, 8th Baronet, and Annabel Lucy Veronica Jones. Sir Reginald and Annabel married on 11 November 1969. The couple divorced in 1974, and Annabel later remarried to William Waldorf Astor III, nephew of her own stepfather Michael Langhorne Astor, with whom she had three more children. Her father also had three more children by his second wife Victoria Penelope Walker.

Samantha Sheffield's birth was registered in Paddington, London. She grew up on the 300-acre (120-hectare) estate of Normanby Hall, five miles (8 km) north of Scunthorpe in North Lincolnshire, though not in the Hall itself, the family having moved out in 1963, some eight years before her birth.

Cameron is a great-granddaughter of Conservative Member of Parliament Sir Berkeley Sheffield and, through him, is a distant cousin of model and actress Cara Delevingne. The father of Samantha's maternal grandmother, Patricia Clifford, was Sir Bede Clifford, a descendant of King Charles II. Her great-grandparents also include the writer Enid Bagnold and her husband Sir Roderick Jones, head of Reuters. Through her great-great-great-grandfather Sir Robert Sheffield, 4th Baronet, she is a fourth cousin of Pamela Harriman, first wife of Winston Churchill's son Randolph Churchill. This Sheffield ancestor was an MP for the same constituency as Thomas Corbett, also an ancestor.

Cameron's family also own a large Yorkshire estate called Sutton Park which has links to the ancestors of Catherine, Princess of Wales.

== Education ==
Cameron initially went to St Helen and St Katharine school in Abingdon, Oxfordshire and then took A-Levels at Marlborough College. She did an Art Foundation course at Camberwell College of Arts and went on to study Fine Art at the School of Creative Arts, part of the University of the West of England.

== Family ==
She and David Cameron married on 1 June 1996 at the Church of St. Augustine of Canterbury, East Hendred, England, five years before he was first elected as MP for Witney at the 2001 general election.

The couple have had four children: Ivan Reginald Ian Cameron (8 April 2002, Hammersmith and Fulham, London – 25 February 2009, Paddington, London), Nancy Gwen Beatrice Cameron (born 19 January 2004, Westminster, London), Arthur Elwen Cameron (born 14 February 2006, Westminster) and Florence Rose Endellion Cameron (born 24 August 2010, Cornwall). Ivan was born with a rare combination of cerebral palsy and severe epilepsy and died at the age of six at St Mary's Hospital, London. Florence Cameron's third given name, Endellion, is taken from the Cornish village of St Endellion; she was born early at the Royal Cornwall Hospital while the Camerons were on holiday in Cornwall.

== Work and politics ==
=== Fashion ===
Cameron was a creative director at the British accessories brand Smythson of Bond Street, from 1997 until May 2010, winning a British Glamour Magazine Award for Best Accessory Designer in 2009. She took on a part-time creative consultancy role at Smythson after her husband became prime minister. From 2011 to 2015, Cameron was on the judging panel for the Vogue Fashion Fund alongside Victoria Beckham, Alexandra Shulman, and Lisa Armstrong. She was an ambassador for the British Fashion Council playing a prominent role in London Fashion Week. In 2013, Cameron was named in Tatler's Top 10 Best Dressed List. In 2015, Cameron was named In Vanity Fair's International Best-Dressed List.

After her husband's 2016 resignation as prime minister, Cameron founded Cefinn, a womenswear brand based in London, making "trend-free clothing for women who moved between roles, in fabrics that didn't need to be dry-cleaned". The first collection previewed in the January 2017 issue of British Vogue (published December 2016) and went on sale in February 2017. The name Cefinn (pronounced 'Seffin') is formed from the initials of her four children (Ivan, Nancy, Elwen, and Florence) between the first and last letters of Cameron. While Cameron suggested her brand's image might be hurt by her husband, The Guardian suggested the company was helped by her relatives in the fashion industry (mother, sister Emily Sheffield, and cousin Cath Kidston). Cameron announced in September 2025 that Cefinn was winding down; its intermittent profitability had ended as high-street fashion chains developed higher-priced ranges.

=== Charitable causes ===
Cameron is active for several charitable causes, and in June 2013 became a patron for Revitalise. Cameron has volunteered for Dress for Success, a nonprofit organisation that gives free clothes and advice about job interviews to unemployed women. In October 2012, she held a benefit for them at Number 10.

On 11 December 2015, it was announced Cameron, one of sixteen celebrities, to participate in the Great Sport Relief Bake Off, which aired in 2016 as part of that year's Sport Relief fundraiser.

Cameron is an ambassador for the charity Save the Children. In March 2013, after visiting Syrian refugees in Lebanon, Cameron said: "As a mother, it is horrifying to hear the harrowing stories from the children I met today, no child should ever experience what they have. With every day that passes, more children and parents are being killed, more innocent childhoods are being smashed to pieces."

=== Other issues ===
Cameron is credited with coining the phrase "There is such a thing as society; it's just not the same thing as the state". This has been said several times by David Cameron, including in his victory speech following his victory in the Conservative leadership election in 2005. It is seen as a rejoinder to Margaret Thatcher's famous comment, frequently misquoted as "there is no such thing as society".

Samantha and David Cameron are members of the Chipping Norton set.

Unofficial roles
Preceded by Sarah Jane Brown	Spouse of the Prime Minister of the United Kingdom; 2010–2016	Succeeded by Philip May
