= Wistaria (disambiguation) =

Wistaria or Wisteria is a genus of flowering plants.

Wistaria may also refer to:

- Wistaria Provincial Park, British Columbia, Canada
- HMS Wistaria (1915), a Royal Navy Arabis-class sloop

== See also ==
- Wisteria (disambiguation)
