= Listed buildings in Sutton-on-the-Forest =

Sutton-on-the-Forest is a civil parish in the county of North Yorkshire, England. It contains 21 listed buildings that are recorded in the National Heritage List for England. Of these, one is listed at Grade I, the highest of the three grades, and the others are at Grade II, the lowest grade. The parish contains the village of Sutton-on-the-Forest and the surrounding countryside. The most important building in the parish is the country house Sutton Park, which is listed, together with a number of associated structures. Most of the rest of the listed buildings are houses and associated structures in the village, and the others include a church, farmhouses, and two mileposts.

== Key ==
Grade	Criteria
I	Buildings of exceptional interest, sometimes considered to be internationally important
II	Buildings of national importance and special interest

== Buildings ==
Name and location	Photograph	Date	Notes	Grade
All Hallows' Church; 54.07516°N 1.11063°W		Late 15th century	The oldest part of the church is the tower, with the rest rebuilt in 1875–77. The church is built in stone with a slate roof, and consists of a nave, a north aisle, a south porch, a chancel with a north vestry and chapel, and a west tower. The tower has three stages, angle buttresses, a southeast stair turret, a south clock face, two-light bell openings, a moulded string course, and an embattled parapet with corner gargoyles and crocketed pinnacles. The porch and the nave also have embattled parapets, and the porch has a moulded four-centred arched entrance.	II
Low Roans; 54.07415°N 1.04423°W		Early 18th century (probable)	The farmhouse is in painted brick, with stepped and cogged eaves, and a pantile roof with raised verges and tumbled-in brickwork. There are two storeys and an attic, three bays, and a rear outshut. The central doorway has a flat brick arch, and the windows are sashes in architraves.	II
Sutton Park; 54.07367°N 1.11049°W		1750–64	A country house in pinkish brick with stone dressings and a slate roof. It consists of a main block with three storeys, a cellar and an attic, with a double depth plan, and five bays, linked by single-storey three-bay wings to pavilions with two storeys and two bays. The entrance front has bands, and a corniced modillion pediment with an oculus in the tympanum. In the centre, a flight of steps with iron balustrades leads up to a doorway with a radial fanlight, an archivolt with a keystone, and an architrave with attached Tuscan columns and a full entablature. The windows are sashes with gauged brick arches. In the centre of the garden front, steps lead up to a central full-height sash window in an architrave, with attached Ionic columns, a pulvinated frieze, and a dentilled cornice.	I
Kitchen garden wall, Sutton Park; 54.07378°N 1.11208°W	—	18th century	The wall enclosing the kitchen garden is in red brick with flat stone coping. The garden has a trapezoidal plan, and the wall is about 3 metres (9.8 ft) in height, with stepped brick pilaster buttresses at intervals. The south wall is heated, with flues, greenhouses and bothies with pantile roofs. Near the centre of this wall is a round-arched opening, at the west end is a full height opening, and at the east end is a cambered-arched opening.	II
Blue Stone Cottage; 54.07496°N 1.10552°W	—	Late 18th century	The house is in mottled pink brick on a plinth, with tabled dentilled eaves, and a pantile roof with raised brick verges and tumbled-in brickwork. There are two storeys and attics, and three bays. The central doorway has an architrave and a hood. Above it is a horizontally sliding sash window, and the other windows on the front are casements, those on the ground floor under elliptical, header-brick arches.	II
Grange Farmhouse; 54.05004°N 1.10218°W	—	Late 18th century (probable)	The farmhouse is in pinkish brick, with a floor band, an eaves band, and a tile roof with tumbled-in brickwork. There are two storeys, three bays, and a rear wing and outshut. The central doorway has a four-light fanlight, the windows on the front are cross-casements, and elsewhere there are sash windows, some horizontally sliding.	II
Laurence House; 54.07479°N 1.11096°W	—	Late 18th century	The house is in red brick, with a floor band, and a Welsh slate roof with stone coping and moulded stone kneelers. There are two storeys and an attic, a front range of three bays, and a rear wing. In the centre is a flat-roofed porch, and a doorway in a reeded architrave with roundels in the corners. The windows on the front are sashes in architraves, and elsewhere some of the sash windows are horizontally sliding.	II
Sterne House; 54.07464°N 1.11248°W	—	Late 18th century	The house is in pinkish brick, with modillion eaves, and a pantile roof with moulded stone kneelers and coping, and tumbled-in brickwork on the left gable. There are two storeys and three bays, and a single-storey former wash house at the rear. Steps lead up to the central doorway that has pulvinated pilasters, a fanlight and a canopy. The windows are sashes in architraves.	II
Chestnut House and railings 54.07409°N 1.11311°W	—	Late 18th to early 19th century	A farmhouse, later a private house and an outbuilding incorporated into the house, it is in brick, the main part with a slate roof, the outbuilding with a pantile roof, with raised verges and tumbled-in brickwork. The house has two storeys, a floor band, three bays, a rear wing and tabled dentilled eaves. Steps lead up to the central doorway that has Ionic pilasters, an architrave, a decorative fanlight, a frieze and a dentilled cornice. The windows are sashes in architraves, with slightly cambered, header-brick arches. The outbuilding to the left has one storey and an attic, quoins on the left, a doorway with a canopy, a sash window and a flat-roofer dormer. Enclosing the front garden are cast iron railings with square corner posts and gate posts with acorn finials.	II
Dunelm Cottage; 54.07504°N 1.10638°W	—	Late 18th to early 19th century	The house is in pinkish-brown brick, with a floor band, tabled dentilled eaves, and a pantile roof with raised brick verges and tumbled-in brickwork. There are two storeys and two bays, and a lower later bay on the left. The doorway has a bracketed hood, and the windows are horizontally sliding sashes.	II
Fir Tree Farmhouse; 54.07472°N 1.10678°W	—	Late 18th to early 19th century	The house is in mottled pink brick, with a floor band, tabled dentilled eaves, and a pantile roof. There are two storeys and two bays, and a rear outshut. The central doorway has a five-light fanlight, and the windows are horizontally sliding sashes, those on the ground floor with wedge lintels. At the rear are casement windows.	II
Forrester's Cottage; 54.07501°N 1.10540°W	—	Late 18th to early 19th century	The house is in pinkish-brown brick on a plinth, with a floor band, stepped dentilled eaves, and a pantile roof with a raised verge on the right and tumbled-in brickwork. There are two storeys and three bays, and a rear outshut. The central doorway has a two-light fanlight, and the windows are horizontally sliding sashes, those on the ground floor with cambered header-brick arches.	II
Low Bohemia Farmhouse; 54.04981°N 1.12591°W		Late 18th to early 19th century	The farmhouse is in pinkish brick, with an eaves band, and a pantile roof with raised verges and tumbled-in brickwork. There are two storeys and three bays, and outshuts on the left. The central doorway has a four-pane fanlight, most of the windows are casements and on the rear is a sash window in an architrave.	II
Newton House Farmhouse; 54.07384°N 1.11331°W	—	Late 18th to early 19th century	The house is in pinkish-brown brick, with a floor band, tabled dentilled eaves, and a pantile roof with tumbled-in brickwork on the gables. There are two storeys, three bays, and a lower rear wing on the right. Steps lead up to the central doorway that has an architrave, a fanlight and a pediment. The windows are sashes, those on the ground floor with cambered arches.	II
School Cottage; 54.07465°N 1.10699°W	—	Late 18th to early 19th century	The house is in pinkish-brown brick, with a floor band, tabled dentilled eaves, and a pantile roof. There are two storeys and three bays. The doorway has a narrow fanlight, the windows are sashes in architraves, and the ground floor openings have gauged flat brick arches.	II
The Orchard; 54.07478°N 1.10839°W	—	Late 18th to early 19th century	The house is in pinkish brown brick, with a floor band, and a pantile roof with raised brick verges and tumbled-in brickwork. Steps lead up to the central doorway, the windows are horizontally sliding sashes, and the ground floor openings have painted flat arches.	II
Former stables, Sutton Park; 54.07421°N 1.10944°W	—	Early to mid-19th century	The stables are in pinkish brick with hipped Lakeland roofs, and form a U-shaped plan, open to the south. The main range has two storeys and eight bays, and the wings have one storey, the left wing with six bays, and the right with five. The doorways have pilasters, friezes and cornices, and the windows are sashes with cambered brick arches. In the centre of the main range is a porch with an oculus, and on the roof is a louvred cupola with a dome and a weathervane.	II
Railings in front of Laurence House; 54.07469°N 1.11096°W	—	Mid-19th century	Along the front of the garden are low brick walls with saddleback stone coping. On the walls are iron railings with spear finials, and standards with palmate finials. The gates are similar, and the gate posts have bulbous acanthus bases and tops, and ball finials.	II
Ice house, Sutton Park; 54.07419°N 1.11134°W	—	Mid-19th century	The ice house, to the northwest of the house, is in pinkish brick, with large slabs over the entrance. It consists of a dome with an inserted window, and it has an entrance passage with a door. The entrance is paved in stone, and the ice chamber consists of a brick-lined, tapering circular pit.	II
Milepost near Grange Farmhouse; 54.04843°N 1.10324°W	—	Late 19th century	The milepost on the west side of York Road is in cast iron, and has a triangular plan and a sloping top. On the top is inscribed "BULMER WEST H.D.", on each side is a pointing hand, on the left side is the distance to Helmsley, and on the right side the distance to York.	II
Milepost in front of Laughton House; 54.07465°N 1.10916°W		Late 19th century	The milepost on the north side of Main Street {B1363 road) is in cast iron, and has a triangular plan and a sloping top. On the top is inscribed "BULMER WEST H.D.", on each side is a pointing hand, on the left side is the distance to Helmsley, and on the right side the distance to York.	II
