= Sutton-on-the-Forest =

Village and civil parish in North Yorkshire, England

Coordinates: 54°04′29″N 1°06′29″W

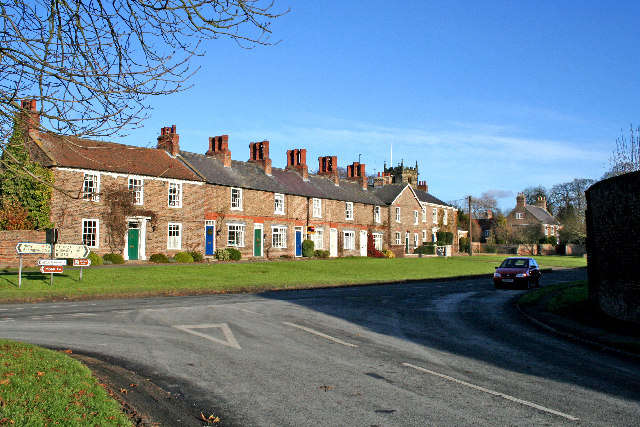
- Main Street, Sutton-on-the-Forest

- Location within North Yorkshire
- Population: 773 (2011 census)
- OS grid reference: SE587647
- Civil parish: Sutton-on-the-Forest
- Unitary authority: North Yorkshire
- Ceremonial county: North Yorkshire
- Region: Yorkshire and the Humber
- Country: England
- Sovereign state: United Kingdom
- Post town: YORK
- Postcode district: YO61
- Dialling code: 01347
- Police: North Yorkshire
- Fire: North Yorkshire
- Ambulance: Yorkshire
- UK Parliament: Thirsk and Malton

Sutton-on-the-Forest is a village and civil parish in North Yorkshire, England. It is 8 miles (13 km) north of York and 4.4 miles (7 km) south-east of Easingwold.

== History ==
The village is mentioned three times in the Domesday Book of 1086 as Sudtune in the Bulford hundred. At the time of the Norman Conquest in 1066 the land was split between the manors of Easingwold and Caldenesche. Therefore, there were several lordships, including Earl Morcar, Gospatric, son of Arnketil, Uthred, Egelfride and Ligulf. Afterward all the land was claimed by the Crown. During the reign of Henry I some land was granted to Bertram de Bulmer of Sheriff Hutton, and the lands then passed through the descent of the Neville family. In the 15th century a settlement was made between the Nevills and Lord Fauconberg, to whom the manor passed. The land then passed to Richard, Earl of Warwick until 1471 when it became forfeit and granted to Richard, Duke of Gloucester, later to be King Richard III. When Richard came to the throne the lands were maintained by royal bailiffs. In 1629 the manor was sold to the citizens of London while its status was being decided. By 1649 the manor had been granted to Lord Fauconberg of Newburgh, whose family held it up to the 18th century when it was acquired by the Harland family. In 1863 the manor passed to Admiral Duncombe, who had married into the family. From 1738 until 1759, the novelist Laurence Sterne was the Anglican vicar of Sutton. He retired from active ministry to pursue his literary career in 1759, writing the first two volumes of his novel Tristram Shandy while living in the village.

The origin of name is derived from the combination of the Old English words "sud" and "tun", which combined mean "South Farm". The suffix relates to the village's location in the ancient Royal Forest of Galtres.

From 1941 to 1946, the RAF operated an airfield on the outskirts of the village. It was part of 4 Group, Bomber Command and originally had RAF Squadrons, but then transferred the site to bombers from the RCAF.

== Governance ==
The village lies within the Thirsk and Malton UK Parliament constituency. It is within the Huby & Tollerton electoral division of North Yorkshire Council.

The village was part of the Hambleton District between 1974 and 2023.

== Geography ==
The nearest settlements are Huby 1.1 miles (1.8 km) to the north west and Stillington 2 miles (3.2 km) to the north.

The 1881 UK Census recorded the population as 1,070. The 2001 UK Census recorded the population as 773, of whom 51.5% were male and 48.5% were female, in 361 dwellings.

== Amenities ==
=== Economy ===
The area is still largely agricultural. The village has a public house and a pub/restaurant. There are two caravan parks on the outskirts of the village. Both are located near the Green Park Business Centre on Goose Lane. The Green Park Business Centre houses small to medium size enterprises as does the various industrialist units on Carr Lane. The village is served by the bus route between York and Easingwold.

=== Education ===
Sutton-on-the-Forest CE Primary School is located on Main Street and is within the catchment area of Easingwold School for secondary education.

=== Local Information ===
Community Events and further Local Information can be found on the village website: https://www.suttonontheforestvillage.org.uk/

== Religion ==
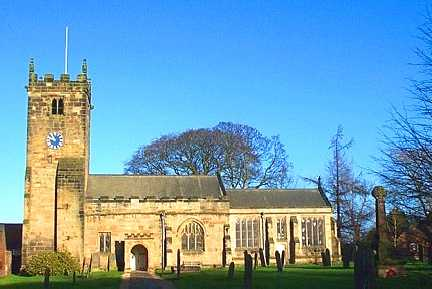
Sutton on the Forest, All Hallows' Church

All Hallows' Church, Sutton-on-the-Forest was almost completely rebuilt in 1877 on the site of the original Mediaeval building. It is a Grade II Listed building.

A Wesleyan Chapel was built in the village in 1864. The Primitive Methodists also built a chapel in the village in 1861. Both are no longer in use.

== Notable people ==
- Laurence Sterne – vicar of Sutton-on-the-Forest (1734–1768), author of Tristram Shandy written whilst living in the village
- William Charles Harland – City of Durham MP (1832–1841), resident at Sutton Hall
- Arthur Duncombe Esq. – Howdenshire MP (1885–1892), resident at Sutton Hall
- Katherine Downes, (born 1982), BBC TV presenter, was married in All Hallows' Church in the village

== Landmarks ==
=== Sutton Park ===
Sutton Park is a grade I listed building built of mellow brick by Thomas Atkinson. The house contains 18th-century furniture and paintings mostly from Buckingham House (now Buckingham Palace), and a collection of porcelain. There is also plaster work by Giuseppe Cortese. The house is an example of early Georgian architecture overlooking landscaped parkland.

Each year the village celebrates its countryside heritage in the Huby and Sutton Show in Sutton Park.

== See also ==
- Listed buildings in Sutton-on-the-Forest
