= Sutton Park, North Yorkshire =

Grade I listed house in North Yorkshire, England

Coordinates: 54.07368°N 1.11030°W

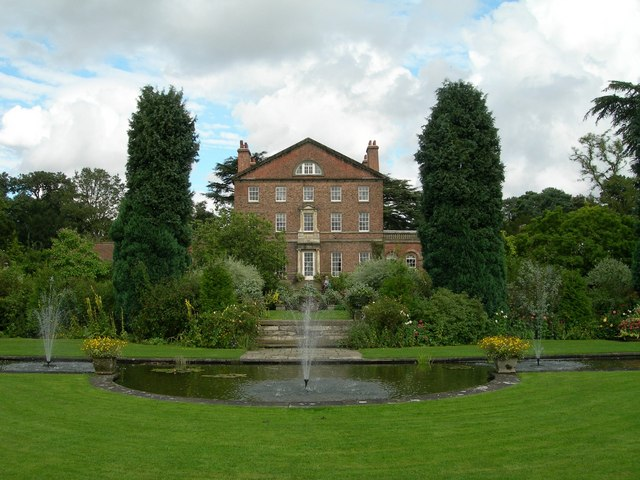
View of house from gardens

Sutton Park is an 18th-century Georgian English country house situated on the edge of the village of Sutton-on-the-Forest, North Yorkshire. It is approximately 10 miles (16 km) north of York, in the ancient Forest of Galtres. The house, a Grade I listed building, is open to the public for part of the year. It is the residence of Sir Reginald Sheffield, 8th Baronet (father of Samantha Cameron, wife of the former Prime Minister David Cameron), and Lady Sheffield.

It was a filming location for the house of Ann Walker in the BBC television series Gentleman Jack.

== History ==
The house was built in 1730. It was altered by Thomas Atkinson for Phillip Harland, who inherited the property in 1750. It has early Georgian architecture and magnificent plasterwork by Cortese.

The house was purchased by the Sheffield family in 1963 when they relocated themselves and pieces of art and furniture from Normanby Hall, North Lincolnshire, their historic family seat.

== Exterior ==
Sutton Park is of red brick and is styled as a villa. The main central building is flanked by two wings: on each side, a set of colonnades joins a smaller structure to the central house. Venetian-style windows in the wings look out upon the house's gardens.

== Interior ==
Ornate plasterwork features throughout the house. Designed by Giuseppe Cortese, this use of plasterwork is especially prominent in the entrance hall, where the Rococo style predominates, and in the library, where the plasterwork illustrates fruit themes.

In March 2015, unpublished photographs from the City of Leeds archives revealed that the panelling and mantelpiece in the study of Sutton Park had been imported from the Morning Room of Potternewton Hall, in Leeds, which was the ancestral estate of Olive Middleton, great-grandmother of Catherine, Princess of Wales. The panelling and mantelpiece in the former Middleton room were designed by Henry Flitcroft in the 1720s.

== See also ==
- Sheffield baronets
- Grade I listed buildings in North Yorkshire (district)
- Listed buildings in Sutton-on-the-Forest
