= Charles William James Orr =

British colonial administrator

Sir Charles William James Orr KCMG

Governor of the Bahamas
- In office 1927–1932
- Monarch: George V
- Preceded by: Sir Harry Edward Spiller Cordeaux
- Succeeded by: Sir Bede Edmund Hugh Clifford

Personal details
- Born: 20 September 1870 United Kingdom
- Died: 1945 (aged 74–75) Surrey, UK

Sir Charles William James Orr, KCMG (20 September 1870 – 1945) was a British colonial administrator.

== Early life and education ==
He was born the youngest son of Major Andrew Orr of Co. Londonderry and educated at Bath College and the Royal Military College, Woolwich.

== Military career ==
He was commissioned into the Royal Garrison Artillery as a second lieutenant on 15 February 1889, and promoted to lieutenant on 15 February 1892. Serving in British India, he was promoted to captain on 7 September 1899. Following the outbreak of the Second Boer War later that year, in March 1900 he was seconded for service in South Africa. He reverted to his regiment in February 1903, and was later promoted to the rank of major.

== Colonial service ==
In 1903 he became the British Resident in Northern Nigeria. From 1911 to 1917 he was Chief Secretary to the Government of Cyprus . and from 1919 to 1926 Colonial Secretary of Gibraltar. He was made CMG in 1921.

He served as Governor of the Bahamas from 1926 to 1932 and was knighted KCMG in 1928.

== Personal life ==
Charles’ elder sister was the astronomer Mary Acworth Orr. His daughter Lettice married Sir Allen Lane, founder of Penguin books, becoming Lady Letitia Lucy Lane.

== Publications ==
Orr wrote two well-received books during his career, The Making of Northern Nigeria in 1911 and Cyprus under British Rule (1918).
