= James Johnstone (publisher) =

British newspaper proprietor

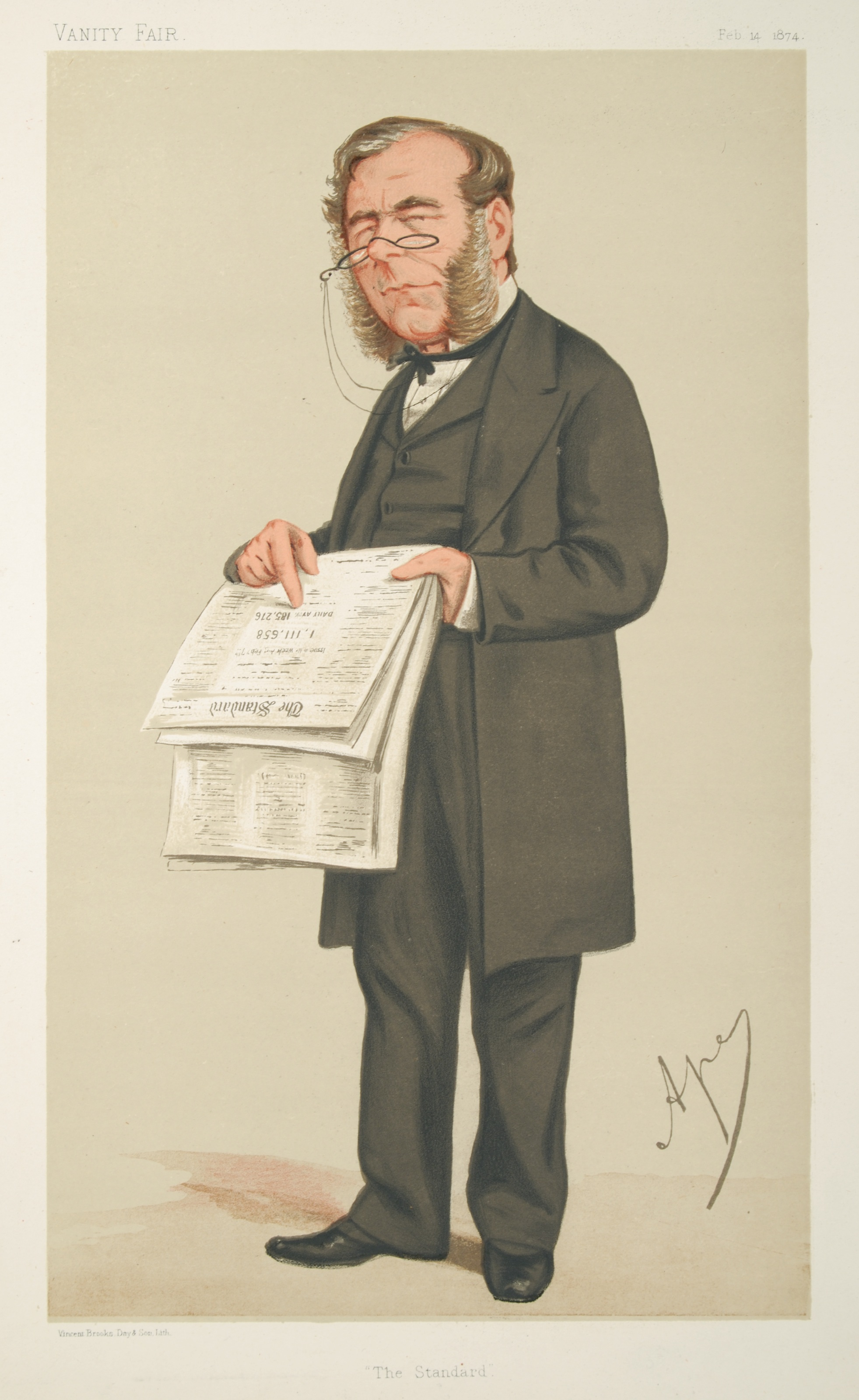
Johnstone caricatured by Ape for Vanity Fair, 1874

James Johnstone (26 June 1815 – 21 October 1878) was a British newspaper proprietor.

== Biography ==
James Johnstone was born in London, the son of a Bankruptcy Court messenger, who he succeeded in 1842. In 1861 he became head of Johnstone, Cooper, Wintle, & Co., managers in chancery, bankrupts' accountants, and public auditors.

In 1857 he bought the newspaper interests of Charles Baldwin, proprietor of the Morning Herald and the Standard for £16,500. The daily circulation of the Standard had fallen to 700 and the business was in financial difficulty. With the help of publisher John Maxwell, for a while his partner in the new enterprise, Johnstone re-issued the Standard as a morning paper on 29 June 1857, reducing its price to twopence and doubling its size to eight large pages. On the same date he also started a high-priced Evening Herald and continued to print the Morning Herald as a fourpenny paper. On 4 February 1858 the price of the Standard was reduced to a penny and an evening issue of the paper revived on 11 June 1860. The Evening Herald was terminated on 27 May 1865 and the Morning Herald on 31 December 1869. The Evening Standard was reformatted 1 January 1870 under the editorship of Charles Williams and in that year reached a circulation figure of 100,000 copies per day. By 1869 Johnstone had repaid all his debts and was sole proprietor of the business.

He died at Hooley House, Coulsdon, Surrey in 1878 and was buried in Coulsdon. He had been married twice, and had children by each marriage. One son, James Johnstone, junior, edited the Standard from 1872 to 1877.
