= Wisteria (catalog) =

American furniture retail company

- Company type: Subsidiary
- Founded: 2000; 26 years ago
- Parent: OKA Direct (from 2018)

Wisteria is an American eCommerce store with an eclectic collection of home and garden accessories from around the world. It is headquartered in Atlanta, Georgia

== History ==
Wisteria is an American-based retail company specializing in home and garden furnishings, clothing, jewelry, gifts as well as vintage and antique items from around the world. Privately owned by Andrew and Shannon Newsom, it began in 2000, placing ads in Veranda Magazine. In 2001, Wisteria sent out its first catalog. Wisteria’s retail store opened in November 2010, and is located in Dallas, Texas, USA across from Dallas Love Field Airport.

Wisteria products have been featured in a variety of television shows, movies, and home décor magazines, including House Beautiful, Country Living, and Better Homes and Gardens.

On the August 31, 2011 airing of The Nate Berkus Show, Nate partnered with Wisteria and Dwell with Dignity to give a struggling single Mom a new home.

Wisteria was acquired by UK-based OKA Direct, Ltd. in September 2018. Terms of the acquisition were not disclosed.
