= Sir Reginald Sheffield, 8th Baronet =

British baronet (born 1946)

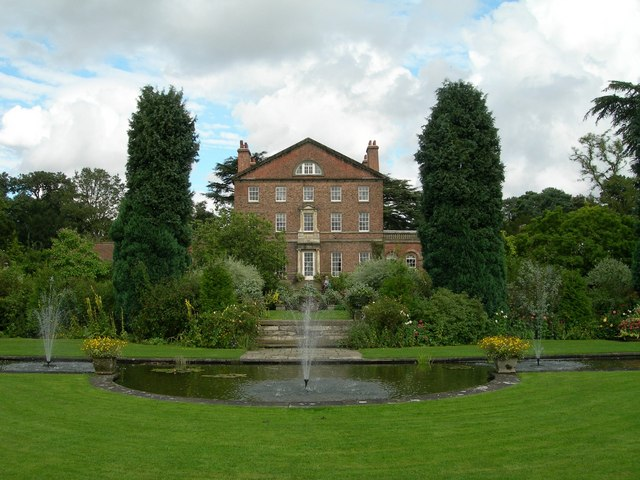
Sutton Park - the Sheffield family seat

Sir Reginald Adrian Berkeley Sheffield, 8th Baronet DL (born 9 May 1946) is a British baronet and father of Samantha Cameron, who is the wife of a former British Prime Minister and Foreign Secretary, David Cameron.

He was educated at Eton College. The son of Edmund Sheffield and Nancy Soames, he succeeded to the baronetcy upon the death of his uncle Sir Robert Sheffield, 7th Baronet in 1977.

He married Annabel Jones in 1969 with whom he had two daughters, Samantha Cameron and Emily Sheffield. He married secondly Victoria Penelope Walker in 1977 with whom he had two daughters and one son.

He served as a Conservative Councillor on Humberside County Council from 1985 to 1993. He is the owner of Sutton Park, Yorkshire and a director of Normanby Estate Company Ltd.

He is a member of White's, Pratt's, and the Beefsteak Club.

In 2011, The Daily Telegraph reported that Sheffield received about £350,000 annually from eight wind turbines on his Normanby Hall estate.

Baronetage of Great Britain
Preceded by Robert Sheffield	Baronet (of Normanby in the County of Lincoln); 1977–present	Incumbent
