= Enid Bagnold =

English dramatist, playwright, and memoirist (1889–1981)

Enid Bagnold CBE
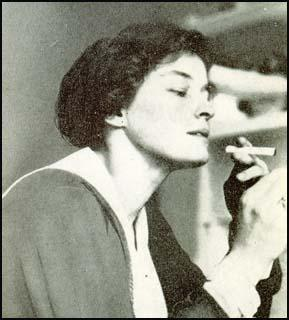
- Bagnold in the 1910s
- Born: Enid Algerine Bagnold; 27 October 1889; Rochester, Kent, England
- Died: 31 March 1981 (aged 91)
- Spouse: Roderick Jones (m. 1920; died 1962)
- Family: Ralph Bagnold (brother) Samantha Cameron (Great Granddaughter)

Enid Algerine Bagnold, Lady Jones, CBE (27 October 1889 – 31 March 1981) was a British writer and playwright best known for the 1935 story National Velvet.

== Early life ==
Enid Algerine Bagnold was born on 27 October 1889 in Rochester, Kent, daughter of Colonel Arthur Henry Bagnold and his wife, Ethel (née Alger), and brought up mostly in Jamaica. Her younger brother was Ralph Bagnold. Bagnold attended Prior's Field school near Godalming, Surrey from 1902 to 1906.

== Career ==
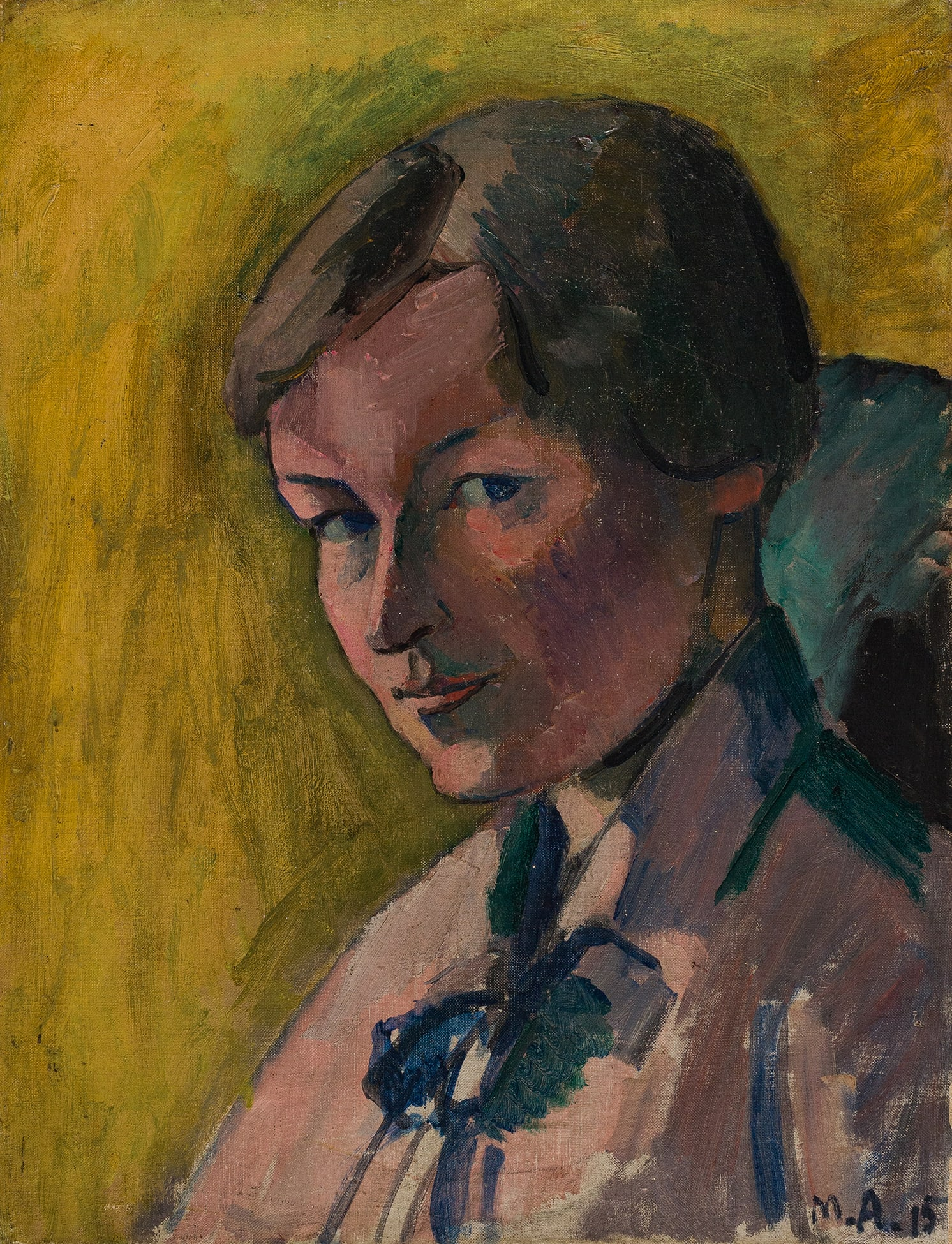
Enid Bagnold age c. 25 by Maurice Asselin

She attended art school in London, and then worked as assistant editor on one of the magazines run by Frank Harris, who became her lover. Harris and Bagnold are both portrayed in Hugh Kingsmill's novel The Will to Love (1919). As an art student in Chelsea, Bagnold painted with Walter Sickert and was sculpted by Gaudier Brzeska. During the First World War she became a Voluntary Aid Detachment nurse; she wrote critically of the hospital administration, which won her fame, and was dismissed as a result. After that she was a driver in France for the remainder of the war years. She wrote about her hospital experiences in her memoir A Diary Without Dates, and about her experiences as a driver in her first novel, The Happy Foreigner.

On 8 July 1920, Bagnold married Sir Roderick Jones, chairman of Reuters, but continued to use her maiden name for her writing. They lived at North End House, Rottingdean, near Brighton (previously the home of Sir Edward Burne-Jones), enjoying a glamorous social life. The garden of North End House inspired her play The Chalk Garden. The Joneses' London house from 1928 until 1969, seven years after Sir Roderick's death, was No. 29 Hyde Park Gate, which meant that they were the neighbours of Winston Churchill and Jacob Epstein for many of those years. The couple commissioned Edwin Lutyens to remodel the 1840s house for their needs, which included a huge nursery for their four children which doubled as a lecture hall. Bagnold wrote in a room described as ‘a ship’s cabin’, with the newel post on the stairs featuring a swivelling copper knob to speed her progress towards it when inspiration struck her.

The couple had four children. The eldest was Laurian (born 1921, later the Comtesse d'Harcourt) who illustrated her mother's books Alice & Thomas & Jane at the age of nine and National Velvet at 14. One of their great-grandchildren is Samantha Cameron, wife of the former Prime Minister and Conservative Party leader David Cameron.

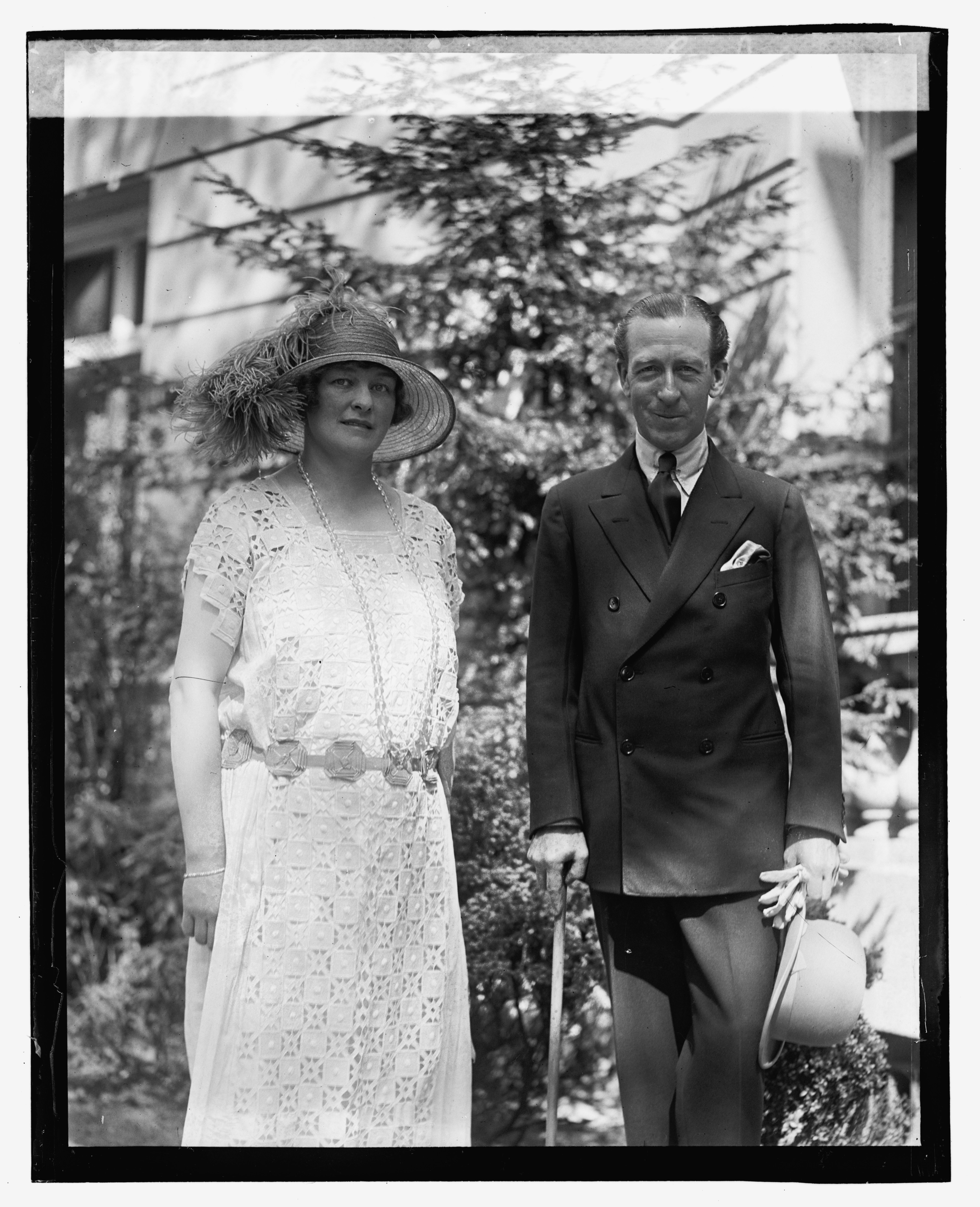
Bagnold and her husband Sir Roderick Jones

== Death and legacy ==
Bagnold published her autobiography in 1969. She died on 31 March 1981 from bronchopneumonia and was cremated at Golders Green Crematorium. Her ashes are buried at St Margaret's Church, Rottingdean. Her biography, by Anne Sebba and published in 1987, revealed some of the more problematic and contradictory aspects of her life: literary feuds, her marriage, her approach to motherhood, pre-war Nazi sympathies, her morphine addiction, and her contempt of the many leading actors who appeared in her plays. Cecil Beaton called it "a strange, remarkable, original and warped life".

== Works ==
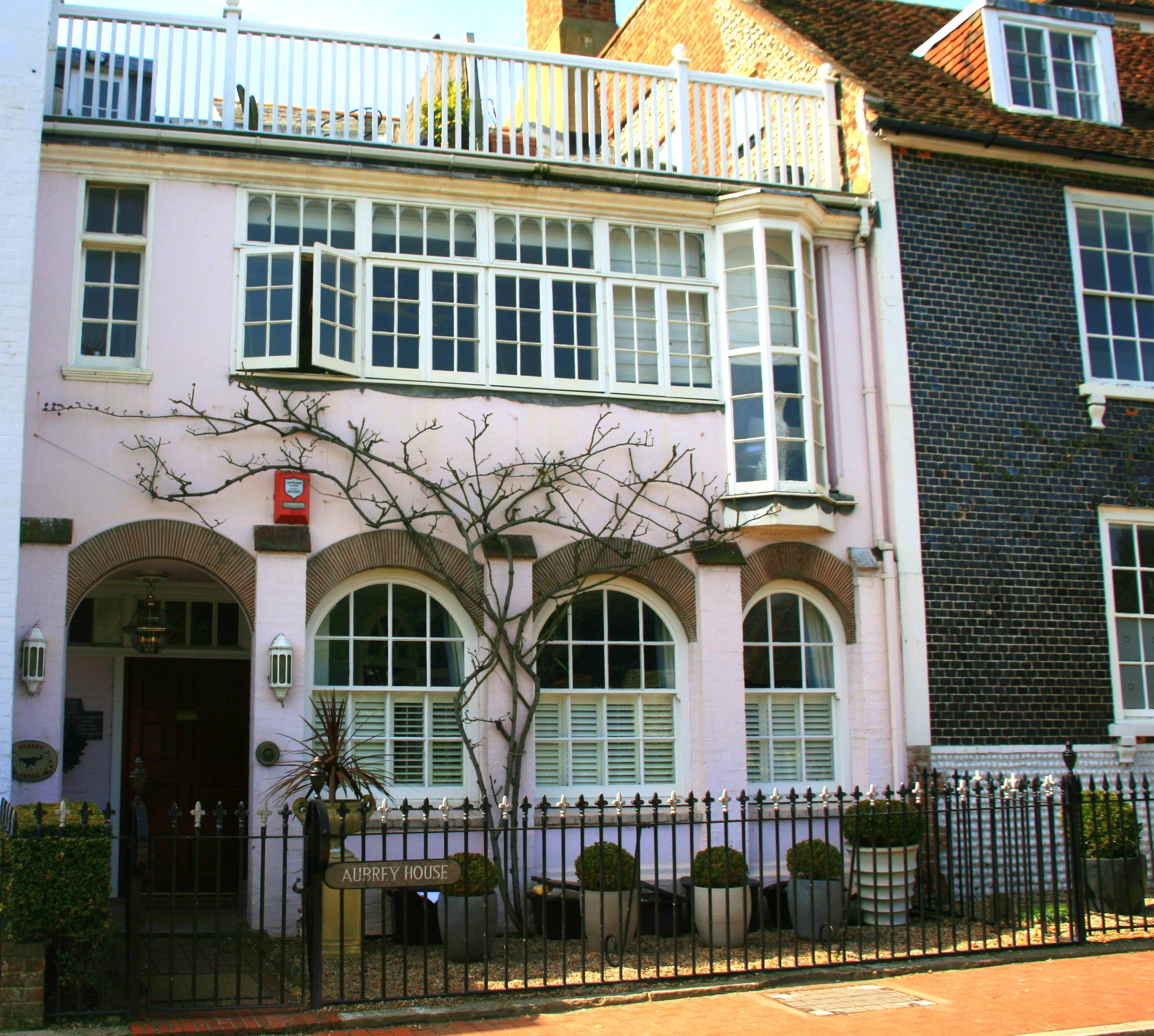
Part of the former home of Enid Bagnold in Rottingdean

National Velvet (1935), is the story of a young girl who wins the Grand National steeplechase. A highly successful film version came out in 1944, starring the young Elizabeth Taylor. However, Bagnold's work includes a broad range of subject matter and style. The Squire is a novel about having a baby. Bagnold's biographer Anne Sebba says that "although always described as a novel, the serious effort to discover the motivations of a mother and the instincts of children leads The Squire close to the realms of documentary." The feminist weekly Time and Tide described it as "a mark in feminist history as well as a fine literary feat." The Loved and Envied (1951), is a study of approaching old age in which the protagonist, Lady Ruby MacLean, is thought to have been based on Lady Diana Cooper.

An adaptation of National Velvet for the theatre was produced and directed by Anthony Hawtrey for his Embassy Theatre at Swiss Cottage in 1946, and published in Volume 2 of his Embassy Successes (1946). But The Chalk Garden (1955), film version 1964, was Bagnold's greatest stage success. The Chinese Prime Minister was presented on Broadway in 1965 with Edith Evans. A Matter of Gravity, originally titled Call Me Jacky, played on Broadway as a star vehicle for Katharine Hepburn in 1976. These three plays, along with The Last Joke - a notable flop at the Phoenix Theatre in 1960 despite its star cast of John Gielgud, Ralph Richardson and Anna Massey - were collected together by Heinemann as Four Plays by Enid Bagnold in 1970.

- A Diary Without Dates (1917)
- The Sailing Ships and other poems (1918)
- The Happy Foreigner (1920)
- Serena Blandish or the Difficulty of Getting Married (1924)
- Alice & Thomas & Jane (1930). Illustrated by Laurian Jones
- National Velvet (1935). Illustrated by Laurian Jones
- The Squire, aka The Door of Life (1938), republished in 2013 by Persephone Books
- Two Plays (1944) ('Lottie Dundass' and 'Poor Judas'), US edition Theatre (1951)
- National Velvet (play, 1946)
- The Loved and Envied (1951)
- Gertie (1952 play)
- The Girl's Journey (1954)
- The Chalk Garden (1955, play)
- The Last Joke (1960, play)
- The Chinese Prime Minister (1964, play)
- A Matter of Gravity (original title Call Me Jacky; 1967, play)
- Autobiography (1969)
- Poems (1978)
- Letters to Frank Harris & Other Friends (1980)
- Early Poems (1987)

== Awards and recognition ==
- Arts Theater Prize for Poor Judas (1951)
- Award of Merit Medal for The Chalk Garden (1956)
- Prize from the Academy of Arts and Letters for The Chalk Garden (1956)

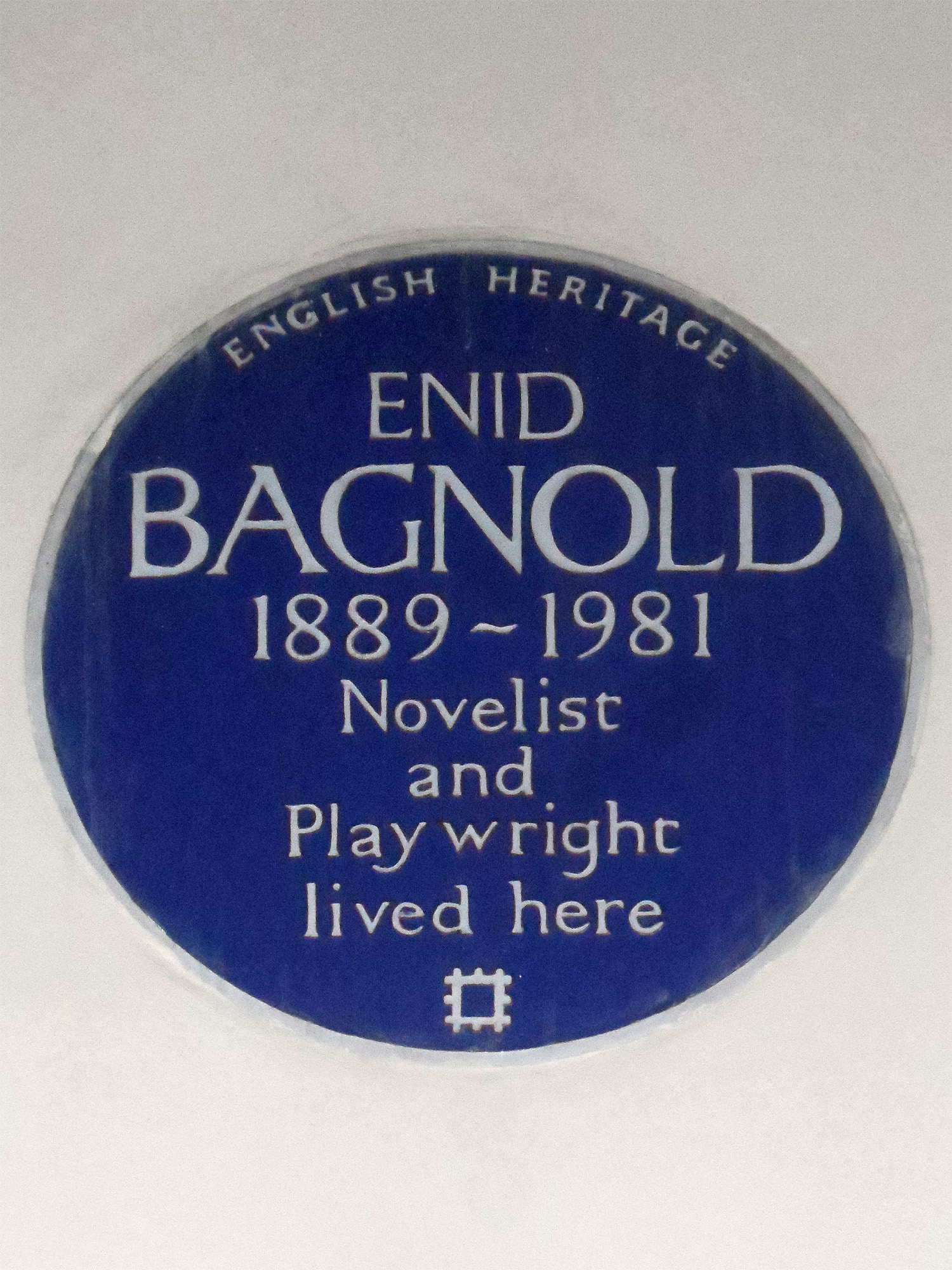
Blue plaque honouring Enid Bagnold at 29 Hyde Park Gate

She was awarded the CBE in 1976.

In 1997, English Heritage unveiled a blue plaque in Bagnold's honour on her home at 29 Hyde Park Gate, Kensington, London.
