= William Astor, 4th Viscount Astor =

English businessman and politician (born 1951)

The Right Honourable The Viscount Astor
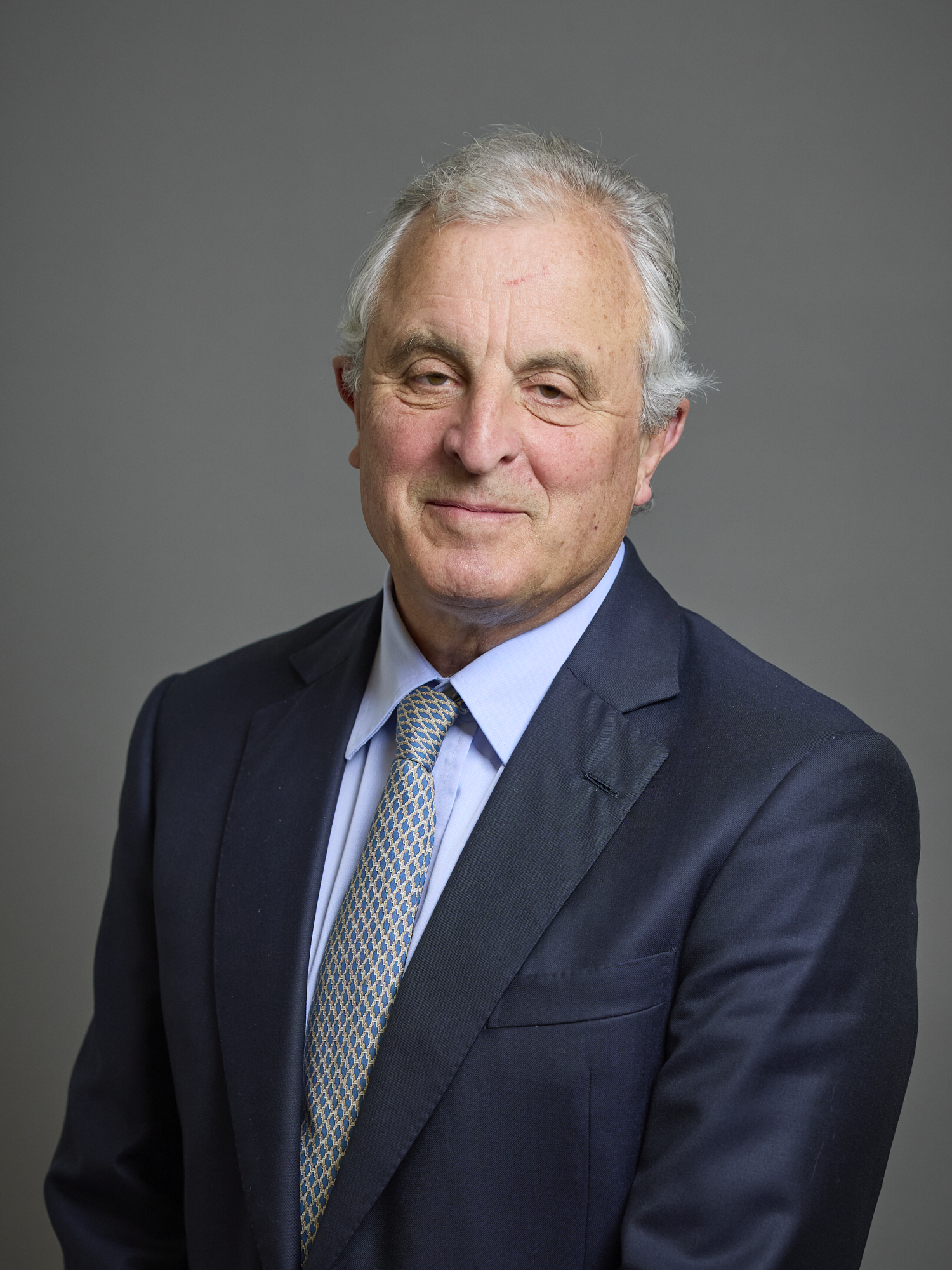
- Official portrait, 2025

Parliamentary Under-Secretary of State for National Heritage
- In office 20 July 1994 – 6 July 1995
- Prime Minister: John Major
- Preceded by: Iain Sproat
- Succeeded by: The Lord Inglewood

Parliamentary Under-Secretary of State for Social Security
- In office 16 September 1993 – 20 July 1994
- Prime Minister: John Major
- Preceded by: Ann Widdecombe
- Succeeded by: James Arbuthnot

Lord-in-waiting; Government Whip
- In office 11 October 1990 – 16 September 1993
- Prime Minister: Margaret Thatcher; John Major
- Preceded by: The Lord Cavendish of Furness
- Succeeded by: The Lord MacKay of Ardbrecknish

Member of the House of Lords
- Lord Temporal
- Hereditary peerage 4 July 1973 – 11 November 1999
- Preceded by: The 3rd Viscount Astor
- Succeeded by: Seat abolished
- Elected hereditary peer 11 November 1999 – 29 April 2026
- Election: 1999
- Preceded by: Seat established
- Succeeded by: Seat abolished

Personal details
- Born: William Waldorf Astor III; 27 December 1951 (age 74)
- Party: Conservative
- Spouse: Annabel Jones (m. 1976)
- Children: 3
- Parents: William Astor, 3rd Viscount Astor; Sarah Norton
- Relatives: Astor family
- Education: Eton College
- Occupation: Politician, businessman

William Waldorf Astor III, 4th Viscount Astor (born 27 December 1951) is an English businessman, hereditary peer, politician and former member of the House of Lords who sat as Conservative. He is a member of the prominent Astor family.

== Biography ==
Astor was a Lord-in-waiting (a House of Lords whip) from 1990 to 1993. He was then made a Parliamentary Under Secretary of State at the Department of Social Security. In 1994, he moved to the Department of National Heritage where he served until leaving the government in 1995.

He was a member of the Founding Council of the Rothermere American Institute at the University of Oxford.

Viscount Astor is co-founder and former Chairman of Silvergate Media (now Sony Pictures Television Kids) and director of Networkers Plc (since 2007) and trustee of Stanley Spencer Gallery in Cookham.

He was removed from the House of Lords, along with all other hereditary peers, when the House of Lords (Hereditary Peers) Act 2026 came into force on 29 April 2026. He was not one of those subsequently given a life peerage to re-enter it.

== Political positions ==
Astor was an early opponent of the HS2 high-speed rail project.

== Marriage and children ==
Astor married Annabel Lucy Veronica Jones (born 1948), daughter of Timothy Angus Jones and Patricia David Pandora Clifford on 14 January 1976. They have three children:

- Hon Flora Katherine Astor (born 7 June 1976). She is married to Theo Rycroft. They have three children.
- Hon William Waldorf "Will" Astor IV (born 18 January 1979). He is married to Lohralee Stutz. They have four children.
- Hon James Jacob "Jake" Astor (born 4 March 1981). He is married to Victoria L. Hargreaves. They have two children.

The heir to the viscountcy is his elder son, Will.

His wife Annabel's stepfather was his uncle Michael Langhorne Astor.

Viscountess Astor was previously married to Sir Reginald Sheffield, 8th Baronet by whom she is the mother of Samantha Cameron, wife of former Prime Minister David Cameron.

== Arms ==
Coat of arms of William Astor, 4th Viscount Astor
Coronet A Coronet of a Viscount Crest From a Mount Vert a Falcon rising proper ensigned by three Mullets Gold Escutcheon Or, a falcon resting on a dexter hand couped at the wrist proper and gauntleted gules in chief two fleurs-de-lys of the last Supporters Dexter: a North American Indian; Sinister: a North American fur trapper; each habited accoutred and holding in the exterior hand a Rifle all proper Motto Ad Astra (To the stars)

Peerage of the United Kingdom
Preceded by William Waldorf Astor II	Viscount Astor; 1966–present Member of the House of Lords (1973–1999)	Incumbent
Parliament of the United Kingdom
New office created by the House of Lords Act 1999	Elected hereditary peer to the House of Lords under the House of Lords Act 1999; 1999–2026	Position abolished under the House of Lords (Hereditary Peers) Act 2026
