= Michael Astor =

British politician (1916–1980)

The Honourable Michael Astor
- Michael Langhorne Astor in 1948

Member of Parliament for East Surrey
- In office 1945–1951
- Preceded by: Charles Emmott
- Succeeded by: Charles Doughty

Personal details
- Born: 10 April 1916
- Died: 28 February 1980 (aged 63)
- Party: Conservative
- Parents: Waldorf Astor, 2nd Viscount Astor (father); Nancy Astor, Viscountess Astor (mother)
- Relatives: Astor family
- Education: Eton College

Military service
- Allegiance: United Kingdom
- Branch/service: British Army
- Rank: Captain
- Unit: GHQ Liaison Regiment
- Conflict: World War II

The Hon. Michael Langhorne Astor (10 April 1916 – 28 February 1980) was a British Conservative Party politician.

== Early life ==
Michael Astor was born on 10 April 1916. He was the fourth of five children born to Waldorf Astor, 2nd Viscount Astor, and Nancy Witcher Langhorne, both Members of Parliament. From the age of eight, he was sent to board at St. Michael's preparatory school in Uckfield, Sussex, where he was a contemporary of the future writer and painter Denton Welch, who later included him in a short story.

Astor was later educated at Eton College and New College, Oxford.

== Military service ==
During World War II, Astor served with the Berkshire Yeomanry in the British Territorial Army and in the GHQ Liaison Regiment, also known as the "Phantom Regiment". He gained the rank of captain by the end of his military service. His younger brother Jakie also served in the Phantom Regiment during the war.

== Career ==
He was elected as Conservative Member of Parliament for Surrey East in the 1945 general election. He kept his seat in the 1950 election but did not stand in 1951. He wrote a memoir, Tribal Feeling, published in 1963, and a novel, Brand, published in 1967.

Astor started serving on the committee of the London Library in 1967, becoming its vice-chair in 1972 and as its chair from 1973 until his death in 1980.

== Personal life ==
Astor was married three times. In 1942, he married Barbara McNeill, with whom he had four children. After their divorce in 1961, she was granted custody of the youngest three children. She later got remarried to George Reginald Ward, 1st and last Viscount Ward of Witley (1907–1988).

Shortly after his divorce, Astor married Pandora Clifford in 1961 before splitting up after seven years. According to Astor's stepdaughter from this marriage, Annabel Jones, "My stepfather had endless affairs and after seven years she just gave up and left". Jones went on to marry his nephew, William Astor, 4th Viscount Astor.

Astor's final marriage was to Judith Innes, to whom he remained married from 1970 until his death in 1980. They had a daughter Polly Michael, who was born in 1971. Polly has a daughter, Martha West, with actor Dominic West.

Parliament of the United Kingdom
Preceded by Charles Campbell Emmott	Member of Parliament for East Surrey; 1945–1951	Succeeded by Charles Doughty
