= Astor (surname) =

Astor is a German surname. Notable people with the surname include:

- Annabel Astor, Viscountess Astor (born 1948), British businesswoman
- Ava Alice Muriel Astor (1902–56), daughter of John Jacob Astor IV
- Bronwen Astor, Viscountess Astor (1930–2017), British model
- Brooke Astor (1902–2007), American philanthropist
- Caroline Schermerhorn Astor (1830–1908), American socialite
- David Astor (1912–2001), British newspaper publisher
- Gavin Astor, 2nd Baron Astor of Hever (1918–84), British publisher
- Irene Astor, Baroness Astor of Hever (1919–2001), British philanthropist
- Jakie Astor (1918–2000), British politician
- John Astor (1923–87), British politician
- John Astor, 3rd Baron Astor of Hever (born 1946), British politician
- John Jacob Astor (1763–1848), German fur-trader and first multi-millionaire of America
- John Jacob Astor III (1822–90), financier
- John Jacob Astor IV (1864–1912), richest passenger on the RMS Titanic
- John Jacob Astor VI (1912–92), son of John Jacob Astor IV and Madeleine Astor
- John Jacob Astor, 1st Baron Astor of Hever (1886–1971), British politician
- Liz Astor, Baroness Astor of Hever (born 1950), British author
- Madeleine Astor (1893–1940), wife of John Jacob Astor IV
- Mary Astor (1906–87), Academy Award-winning American actress
- Michael Astor (1916–80), British Conservative Party politician
- Nancy Astor, Viscountess Astor (1879–1964), first woman to serve as a British Member of Parliament
- Violet Astor, Baroness Astor of Hever (1889–1965), British aristocrat
- Vincent Astor (1891–1959), American businessman and philanthropist
- Waldorf Astor, 2nd Viscount Astor (1879–1952), politician and newspaper proprietor
- William Astor, 3rd Viscount Astor (1907–66), British Conservative Party politician
- William Astor, 4th Viscount Astor (born 1951), British politician
- William Backhouse Astor Sr. (1792–1875), businessman
- William Backhouse Astor Jr., (1829–92), businessman
- William Waldorf Astor, 1st Viscount Astor (1848–1919), attorney
