= Violet Astor, Baroness Astor of Hever =

English aristocrat

The Right Honourable The Lady Astor of Hever DStJ
- Violet Astor, Baroness Astor of Hever
- Born: Violet Elliot-Murray-Kynynmound; 28 May 1889; London, England
- Died: 3 January 1965 (aged 75); Pégomas, near Grasse
- Spouses: Lord Charles Petty-Fitzmaurice (m. 1909; 1914) John Jacob Astor, 1st Baron Astor of Hever (m. 1918)
- Children: Lady Mary Margaret Elizabeth Petty-Fitzmaurice; George Petty-Fitzmaurice, 8th Marquess of Lansdowne; Gavin Astor, 2nd Baron Astor of Hever; Hugh Waldorf Astor; John Astor
- Parent(s): Gilbert Elliot-Murray-Kynynmound, 4th Earl of Minto; Mary Caroline Grey
- Relatives: See Astor family

Violet Astor, Baroness Astor of Hever DStJ (née Elliot-Murray-Kynynmound; 28 May 1889 – 3 January 1965), styled Lady Charles Fitzmaurice between 1909 and 1914 and Lady Charles Mercer Nairne between 1914 and 1918, was an English aristocrat.

== Origins ==
Violet Elliot-Murray-Kynynmound was born on 28 May 1889, the third of the five children of Gilbert Elliot-Murray-Kynynmound, 4th Earl of Minto, Viceroy and Governor-General of India and Governor General of Canada, by his wife Mary Caroline Grey, a daughter of General Charles Grey, the second son of Charles Grey, 2nd Earl Grey.

== Personal life ==
Lady Violet was twice-married. Her first marriage was on 20 January 1909, to Lord Charles Fitzmaurice (later Mercer Nairne), the younger son of Henry Petty-FitzMaurice, 5th Marquess of Lansdowne by his wife Lady Maud Evelyn Hamilton, a daughter of James Hamilton, 1st Duke of Abercorn by his wife Lady Louisa Jane Russell, a daughter of John Russell, 6th Duke of Bedford. By her first husband she had issue one son and one daughter:

- Lady Mary Margaret Elizabeth Mercer Nairne (1910–2003), who married Lt. Col. Ririd Myddleton and was granted the rank of a marquess's daughter in 1946.
- George Petty-Fitzmaurice, 8th Marquess of Lansdowne (1912–1997), who married four times and was the father of Charles Petty-Fitzmaurice, 9th Marquess of Lansdowne.

Lord Charles was killed in action on 30 October 1914 in World War I.

=== Second marriage ===
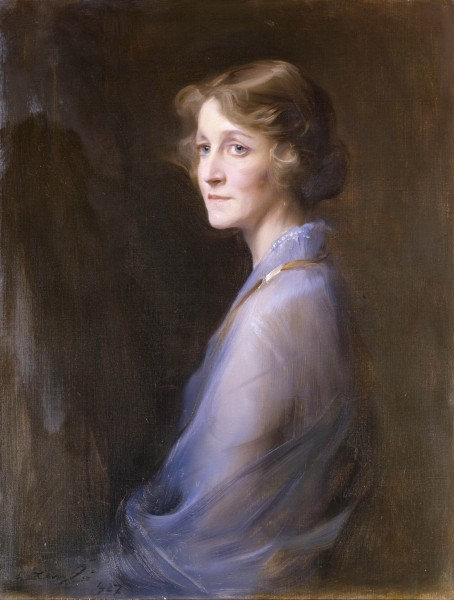
Portrait of Lady Astor of Hever, by Philip de László, 1927

After the death of her first husband, she remarried on 28 August 1916 to John Jacob Astor, 1st Baron Astor of Hever (1886–1971), of Hever Castle in Kent and of Carlton House Terrace in Westminster, the youngest son of William Waldorf Astor, 1st Viscount Astor. He supported Neville Chamberlain and was elevated to the Peerage on 21 January 1956 as Baron Astor "of Hever". By Astor she had three sons:

- Gavin Astor, 2nd Baron Astor of Hever (1918–1984), who married Lady Irene Haig, the youngest daughter of Douglas Haig, 1st Earl Haig, by whom he had five children including John Jacob Astor VIII ("Johnny" Astor).
- Lt. Col. Hon. Hugh Waldorf Astor (1920–1999), who married Emily Lucy Kinloch, a niece of Diana Vreeland, and had five children.
- Hon. John Astor (1923–1987), who married Diana Kathleen Drummond, a grand-niece of Herbert Samuel Holt, and had three children.

In 1962, she moved with her husband to France. Lady Astor died on 3 January 1965 at her villa in Pégomas, near Grasse in the South of France.
