= John Astor =

John Astor may refer to:

- John Jacob Astor (1763–1848), German-born American businessman
- John Jacob Astor III (1822–1890), grandson of the above, American financier and philanthropist
- John Jacob Astor IV (1864–1912), nephew of the above, American businessman who died on the Titanic
- John Jacob Astor, 1st Baron Astor of Hever (John Jacob Astor V, 1886–1971), grandson of the financier, American-born English newspaper proprietor and politician
- John Jacob Astor VI (1912–1992), son of the Titanic victim, American socialite and shipping businessman
- John Astor (1923–1987), son of the 1st Baron, English politician
- Jakie Astor (Sir John Jacob Astor VII, 1918–2000), nephew of the 1st Baron, English politician and sportsman
- John Astor, 3rd Baron Astor of Hever (John Jacob Astor VIII, born 1946), grandson of the 1st Baron, English businessman and politician

== See also ==
- Astor family
