= Viscount Astor =

Viscountcy in the Peerage of the United Kingdom

Viscountcy of Astor
- Arms of Viscount Astor: Or, a falcon resting on a dexter hand couped at the wrist proper and gauntleted gules in chief two fleurs-de-lys of the last
- Creation date: 28 June 1917
- Created by: King George V
- Peerage: Peerage of the United Kingdom
- First holder: William Waldorf Astor, 1st Baron Astor
- Present holder: William Astor, 4th Viscount Astor
- Heir apparent: The Hon. William Astor
- Remainder to: Heirs male of the first viscount's body, lawfully begotten
- Subsidiary titles: Baron Astor
- Seat: Ginge Manor
- Former seats: Hever Castle; Cliveden
- Motto: Ad Astra ("To the stars")

Coat of arms of Viscount Astor

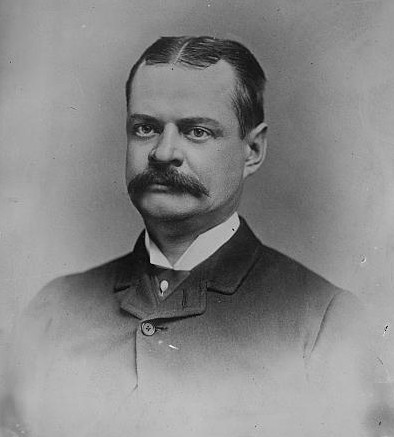
William Waldorf Astor, 1st Viscount Astor

Viscount Astor, of Hever Castle in the County of Kent, is a title in the Peerage of the United Kingdom. It was created in 1917 for the financier and statesman William Waldorf Astor, 1st Baron Astor. He had already been created Baron Astor, of Hever Castle in the County of Kent, in 1916, also in the Peerage of the United Kingdom.

His eldest son Waldorf, the second Viscount, was the husband of Nancy Astor, Viscountess Astor, the first woman to sit in the House of Commons. As of 2017, the titles are held by their grandson, the fourth Viscount, who succeeded his father in 1966. He was one of the ninety-two elected hereditary peers that remained in the House of Lords after the passing of the House of Lords Act 1999, and sat as a Conservative.

John Jacob Astor, 1st Baron Astor of Hever, was the third son of the first Viscount. This peerage, Baron Astor of Hever, was a separate creation in 1956 and not to be confused with the Viscount's subsidiary title of Baron Astor, of Hever Castle in the County of Kent. The Hon. David Astor CH, the Hon. Michael Astor and the Hon. Sir Jakie Astor, younger sons of the second Viscount, all gained prominence in public life.

The family seat is Ginge Manor, near Wantage, Oxfordshire.

The first three Viscounts Astor are buried within the Astor family chapel (also known as the Octagon Temple) at the Cliveden estate near Taplow, Buckinghamshire.

== Baron Astor (1916) ==
- William Waldorf Astor, 1st Baron Astor (1848–1919) (created Viscount Astor in 1917)

=== Viscounts Astor (1917) ===
- William Waldorf Astor, 1st Viscount Astor (1848–1919)
- Waldorf Astor, 2nd Viscount Astor (1879–1952)
- William Waldorf Astor, 3rd Viscount Astor (1907–1966)
- William Waldorf Astor, 4th Viscount Astor (born 1951)

The heir apparent is the present holder's eldest son, the Hon. William Waldorf Astor (born 1979).
The heir apparent's heir apparent is his son, William Waldorf Astor (born 2012).

== Line of succession ==
- William Waldorf Astor, 1st Viscount Astor (1848-1919)
  - Waldorf Astor, 2nd Viscount Astor (1879-1952)
    - William Astor, 3rd Viscount Astor (1907-1966)
      - William Astor, 4th Viscount Astor (b. 1951)
        - (1) William Astor (b. 1979)
          - (2) William Astor (b. 2012)
          - (3) Conrad Astor (b. 2016)
        - (4) James Astor (b. 1981)
    - David Astor (1912-2001)
      - (5) Richard Astor (b. 1955)
      - (6)Thomas Astor (b. 1962)
    - Michael Astor (1916-1980)
    - Jakie Astor (1918-2000)
      - (7) Michael Astor (b. 1946)
      - John Astor (1962-1963)
  - John Rudolph Astor (1881)
  - John Jacob Astor, 1st Baron Astor of Hever (1886-1971)
    - Gavin Astor, 2nd Baron Astor of Hever (1918-1984)
      - (8) John Astor, 3rd Baron Astor of Hever (b. 1946)
        - (9) Charles Astor (b. 1990)
      - (10) Philip Astor (b. 1959)
    - Hugh Astor (1920-1999)
    - John Astor (1923-1987)
      - John Astor (1953-2016)
      - (11) George Astor (b. 1958)

== See also ==
- Baron Astor of Hever
- Astor family
