= Astor family =

Prominent Anglo-American family

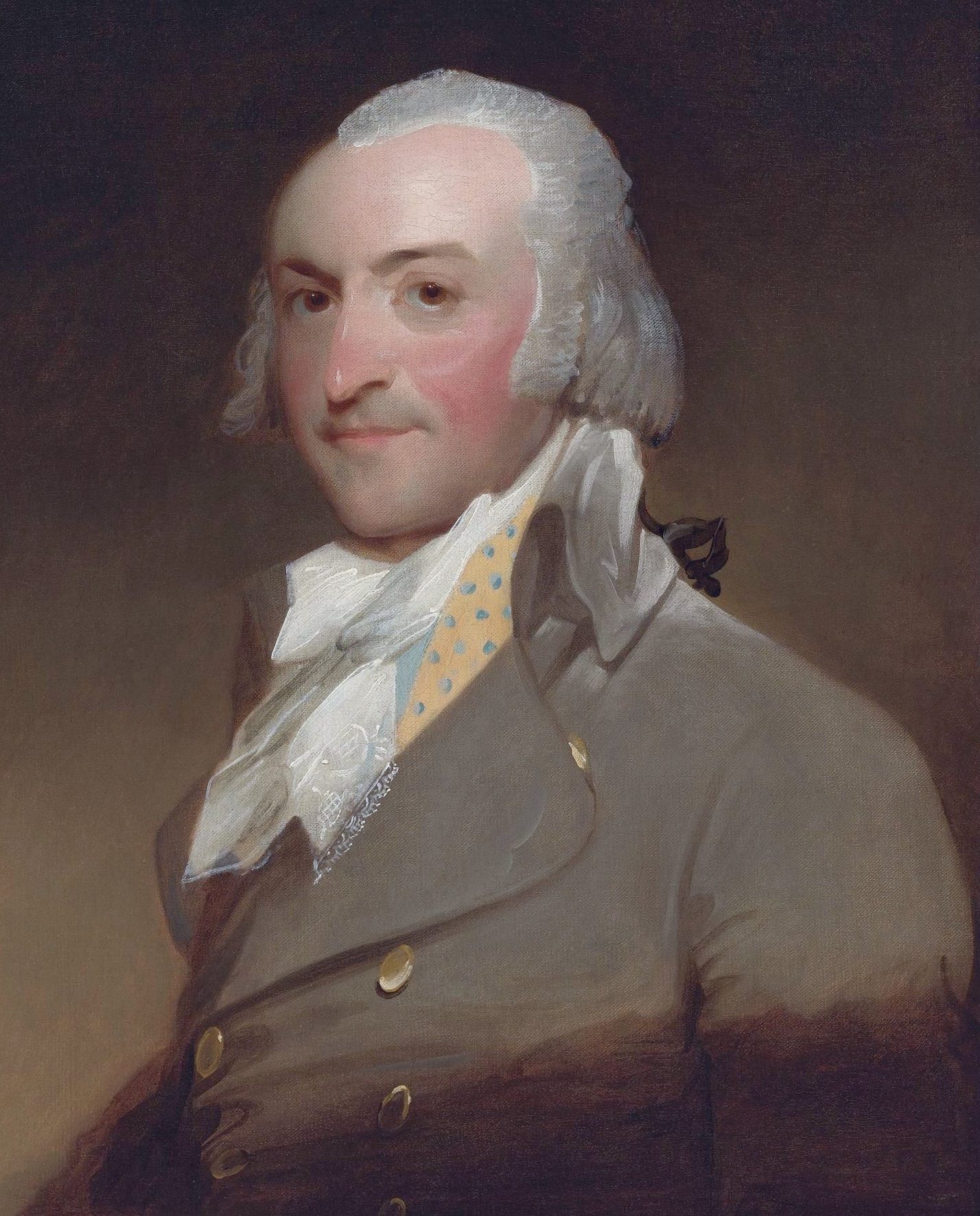
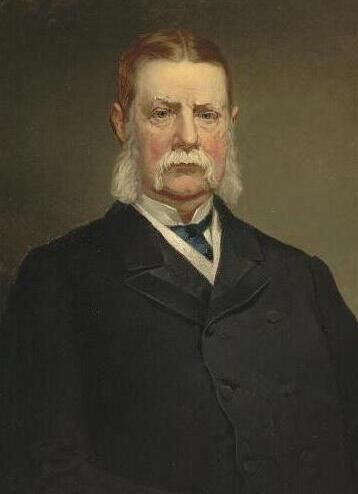
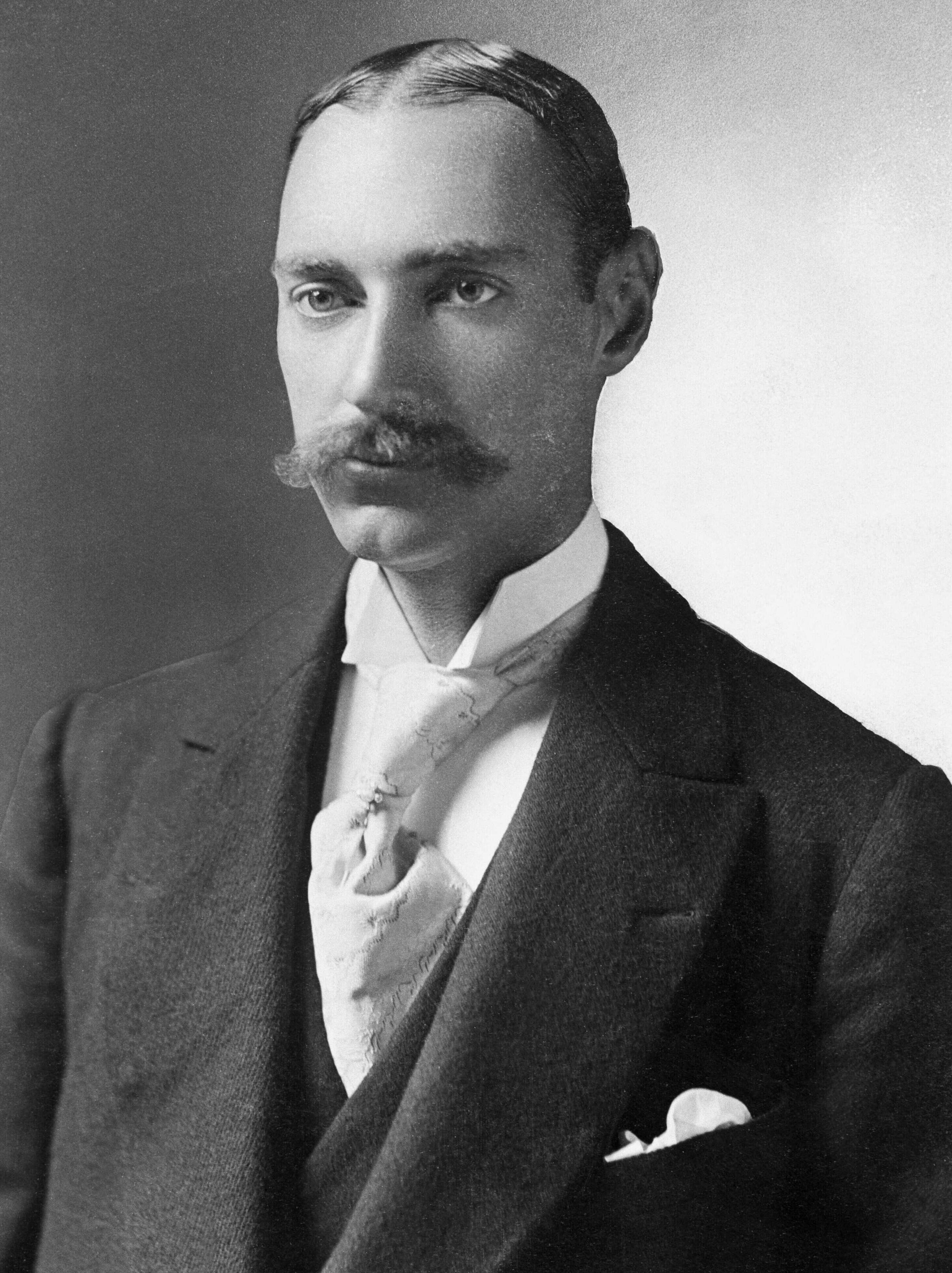
- John Jacob Astor John Jacob Astor III John Jacob Astor IV
- Current region: United States; United Kingdom
- Origin: Walldorf, Electoral Palatinate; Chiavenna, Duchy of Savoy
- Current head: William Astor, 4th Viscount Astor
- Connected families: Livingston family; Roosevelt family; Bayard family; Stuyvesant family
- Heirlooms: Sancy diamond
- Estates: 840 Fifth Avenue; Beaulieu House; Beechwood; Cliveden; Rokeby; Ferncliff; Hever Castle; Lansdowne House; Astor House; Villa Astor; Bletchingdon Park

The Astor family achieved prominence in business, society, and politics in the United States and the United Kingdom during the 19th and 20th centuries. With German roots, some of their ancestry goes back to the Italian and Swiss Alps, the Astors settled in Germany, first appearing in North America in the 18th century with John Jacob Astor, one of the wealthiest people in history. The family holds two peerages in the United Kingdom, Viscount Astor and Baron Astor of Hever.

== Founding family members ==
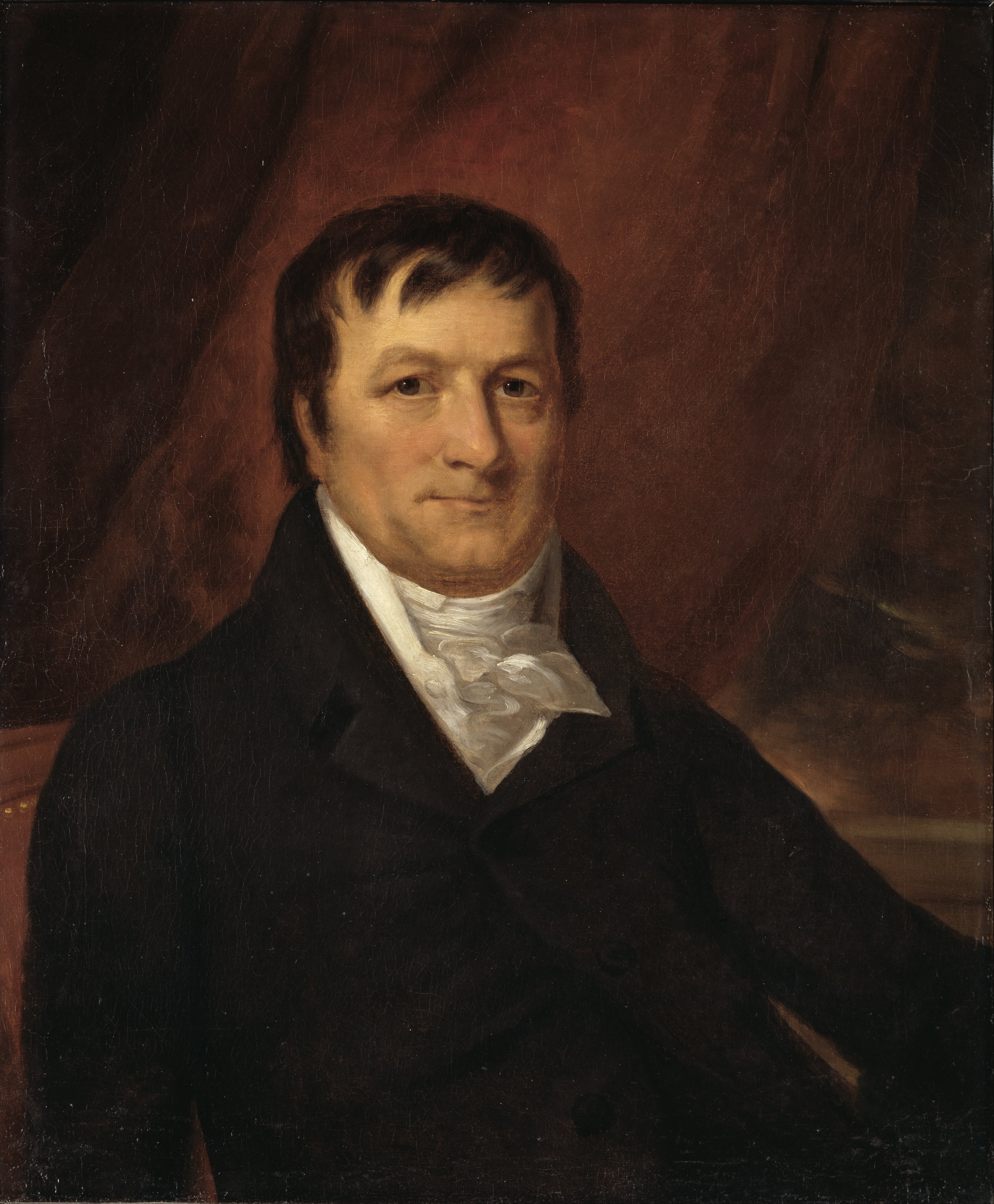
Portrait of John Jacob Astor, the founder of the Astor business dynasty

John Jacob Astor (born Johann Jakob Astor) was the youngest of four sons born to Johann Jacob Astor (1724–1816) and Maria Magdalena vom Berg (1730–1764).

The Astor family can trace their ancestry back to Giovan Asdour (1595–1668) and Gretta Ursula Asdour (1589–?). Giovan was born in Chiavenna, Italy, and died in Zürich, Switzerland. Their son, Hans Pieter Asdor, was born in Switzerland and died in Nußloch.

John Jacob and his brother George, born in Walldorf left Germany and moved to London in 1778. There, they established a flute making company. In 1783, John Jacob left for Baltimore, Maryland, leaving his brother in charge of the London business, and was active first as a dealer in woodwind instruments, then in New York as a merchant in opium, furs, pianos, and real estate. After moving to New York, John met and married Sarah Cox Todd (1762–1842). She worked alongside her husband as a consultant, and was accused of witchcraft after her success with the company in 1817. The accusations never led to legal action. They had eight children, including John Jacob Astor Jr. (1791–1869) and real-estate businessman William Backhouse Astor Sr. (1792–1875).

John Jacob's fur-trading company established a Columbia River trading post at Fort Astoria in 1811, the first United States community on the Pacific coast. He financed the overland Astor Expedition in 1810–1812 to reach the outpost, which was in the then-disputed Oregon Country. Control of Fort Astoria played a key role in British and American territorial claims on the region.

John and George's brother Henry (born Heinrich) (1754–1833) also emigrated to America. Henry was a horse-racing enthusiast, and purchased a thoroughbred named Messenger, who had been brought from England to America in 1788. This horse became the founding sire of all Standardbred horses in the United States today.

Melchior, the third of the four brothers, remained in Germany.

During the 19th century, the Astors became one of the wealthiest families in the United States. Toward the end of that century, some of the family moved from the United States to England and achieved high prominence there. During the 20th century, the number of American Astors began to decline, but their legacy lives on in their many public works including the New York Public Library. British descendants of the Astors hold two hereditary peerages: Viscount Astor and Baron Astor of Hever.

While many Astor family members joined the Episcopal Church, John Jacob Astor remained a member of a Reformed congregation to his death.

== Family namesake places ==
For many years, the members of the Astor family were known as "the landlords of New York". Their New York City namesakes are the famous Waldorf-Astoria Hotel, and Astor Row, Astor Court, Astor Place, and Astor Avenue in the Bronx, where the Astors stabled horses. The neighborhood of Astoria, Queens, was renamed to incite John Jacob Astor to invest there.

Beyond New York City, the Astor family name is imprinted in a great deal of United States history and geography. Astor Street, in Chicago's landmark Gold Coast district, is named after John Jacob Astor. There are towns of Astor in the states of Florida, Georgia, Iowa, and Kansas and there are Astorias in Illinois, Missouri, and Oregon. In Astoria, Oregon, the primary elementary school, a filming location for the 1990 film Kindergarten Cop, is called John Jacob Astor Elementary. The city is also home to the Astoria Column.

In Maidstone, Kent, United Kingdom, there was a secondary state school named Astor of Hever School. It was located within Oakwood Park, a former residence of the Astor family, which the family gifted to the Borough of Maidstone to be used for educational purposes. Whilst the Astor of Hever School changed its name in the early 2010s, it is still located on the Oakwood Park Estate, along with a Grammar School, a Catholic Secondary school and the Maidstone campus of Mid-Kent College. At one time the Oakwood Park Estate also contained an educational farm attached to the Astor of Hever School.

There is a neighborhood called Astor Park just south of downtown Green Bay, Wisconsin. At the heart of this neighborhood is a park (also called "Astor Park"); the Astor family donated this land for the building of a trade school.

The Astors were also prominent on Mackinac Island, Michigan, and Newport, Rhode Island, with their summer house, Beechwood. At Grand Hotel on Mackinac Island, there are the Lord and Lady Astor Suites; the hotel salon is called Astor's. There is even a Hostel in York, England called The Astor. In addition, a dormitory at St. George's School in Newport, Rhode Island, bears Astor's name.

The Danubius Hotel Astoria in the center of Pest, Budapest, Hungary, opened in 1914, was given its name by the original hotel owners and Mihály Gellér, the first General Manager of the hotel, who formerly worked for the Waldorf-Astoria Hotel in New York. This hotel in turn gave its name to a Budapest Metro station. In Shanghai, China there is the Astor House Hotel in the Bund.

Mount Astor in Antarctica was named after Vincent Astor by the explorer Richard E. Byrd.

== Astor family tree ==
Coat of arms of Viscount Astor

- John Jacob Astor Sr. (1763–1848)
  - Magdalena Astor (1788–1832)
    - Charles Astor Bristed Sr. (1820–1874)
  - John Jacob Astor Jr. (1791–1869)
  - William Backhouse Astor Sr. (1792–1875)
    - Emily Astor (1819–1841)
      - Margaret Astor "Maddie" Ward (1838–1875)
        - John Armstrong Chaloner (1862–1935)
        - Winthrop Astor Chanler (1863–1926)
          - Theodore Chanler (1902–1961)
        - William Astor "Willie" Chanler Sr. (1867–1934)
        - Lewis Stuyvesant Chanler Sr. (1869–1942)
        - Margaret Chanler Aldrich (1870–1963)
        - Robert Winthrop Chanler (1872–1930)
    - John Jacob Astor III (1822–1890)
      - William Waldorf Astor I (1848–1919)
        - Waldorf Astor (1879–1952)
          - William Waldorf "Bill" Astor II (1907–1966)
            - William Waldorf Astor III (born 1951)
              - Flora Katherine Astor (born 1976)
              - William Waldorf "Will" Astor IV (born 1979)
              - James Jacob Astor (born 1981)
          - Nancy Phyllis Louise Astor, Countess of Ancaster (1909–1975)
            - Jane Heathcote-Drummond-Willoughby, 28th Baroness Willoughby de Eresby (born 1938)
          - Francis David Langhorne Astor (1912–2001)
          - Michael Langhorne Astor (1916–1980)
            - David Waldorf Astor (born 1943)
            - James Colonsay Langhorne Astor (born 1945)
            - Kathleen Nancy Jane Astor (1949-2006)
            - Georgina Mary Astor (born 1952)
              - Thomas Michael Nelson (born 1979)
              - Alice Catherine Nelson (born 1981)
              - Clare Emma Nelson (born 1983)
          - John Jacob "Jakie" Astor VII (1918–2000)
        - The Hon. Pauline Astor (1880–1972)
          - Rachel Pauline Spender-Clay (1907–1996), married David Bowes-Lyon
            - Davina Katherine Bowes-Lyon, Countess of Stair (1930–2017)
              - John Dalrymple, 14th Earl of Stair (born 1961)
            - Simon Bowes-Lyon (born 1932)
        - John Jacob Astor V, 1st Baron Astor of Hever (1886–1971)
          - Gavin Astor, 2nd Baron Astor of Hever (1918–1984)
            - John Jacob "Johnny" Astor VIII, 3rd Baron Astor of Hever (born 1946)
            - Sarah Violet Astor-Lopes (born 1953)
              - Harry Marcus George Lopes (born 1977), married Laura Lopes
          - John Astor (1923–1987)
    - Mary Alida Astor (1826–1881)
      - Margaret Laura Astor Carey (1853–1911)
        - Louis Zborowski (1895–1924)
    - William Backhouse Astor Jr. (1829–1892)
      - Emily Astor (1854–1881)
        - James Laurens Van Alen (1878–1927)
          - Jimmy Van Alen (1902–1991)
          - Louise Astor Van Alen (1910–1997)
      - Helen Schermerhorn Astor (1855–1893)
        - James Roosevelt "Tadd" Roosevelt Jr. (1879–1958)
      - Carrie Astor Wilson (1861–1948)
        - Marshall Orme Wilson Jr. (1885–1966)
      - John Jacob "Jack" Astor IV (1864–1912)
        - William Vincent Astor (1891–1959)
        - Ava Alice Muriel Astor (1902–1956)
          - Prince Ivan Sergeyevich Obolensky (1925–2019)
            - Marina Ivanovna Obolensky (born 1951)
            - Ivan Ivanovich Obolensky (born 1952)
            - David Ivanovich Obolensky (born 1953)
              - Natalya Elizabeth Davidovna Obolensky (born 1984)
              - Octavia Willing Davidovna Obolensky (born 1989)
            - Sergei Ivanovich Obolensky (born 1960)
              - Alexander Vasily Sergeyevich Obolensky (born 1994)
              - Christopher Chapman Sergeyevich Obolensky (born 1999)
          - Sylvia Sergeyevna Obolensky (1931–1997)
        - John Jacob "Jakey" Astor VI (1912–1992)
          - William Backhouse Astor III (1935-2008)
            - William Backhouse Astor IV (born 1959)
            - Gregory Todd Astor (born 1966)
          - Mary Jacqueline Astor (born 1949)
            - Nicholas Astor Drexel (born 1987)
  - Dorothea Astor 1795–1874)
    - Eliza Astor Langdon (1818–1896)
      - Matthew Astor Wilks (1844–1926)
    - Louisa Dorothea Langdon (1820–1894)
      - DeLancey Astor Kane (1844–1915)
      - S. Nicholson Kane (1846–1906)
      - John Innes Kane (1850–1913)
      - Emily Astor Kane (1854–1932)
        - Peter Augustus Jay (1877–1933)
          - Susan Mary Jay (1918–2004)
      - Sybil Kent Kane (1856–1946)
      - Woodbury Kane (1859–1905)

== Members by birth order ==
1. John Jacob Astor Sr. (1763–1848)
2. William Backhouse Astor Sr. (1792–1875)
3. Charles Astor Bristed Sr. (1820–1874)
4. John Jacob Astor III (1822–1890)
5. William Backhouse Astor Jr. (1829–1892)
6. Matthew Astor Wilks (1844–1926)
7. DeLancey Astor Kane (1844–1915)
8. S. Nicholson Kane (1846–1906)
9. William Waldorf Astor I (1848–1919)
10. John Innes Kane (1850–1913)
11. Sybil Kent Kane (1856–1946)
12. Woodbury Kane (1859–1905)
13. Carrie Astor Wilson (1861–1948)
14. John Armstrong Chaloner (1862–1935)
15. Winthrop Astor Chanler (1863–1926)
16. John Jacob "Jack" Astor IV (1864–1912, died in the sinking of the Titanic)
17. William Astor "Willie" Chanler Sr. (1867–1934)
18. Lewis Stuyvesant Chanler Sr. (1869–1942)
19. Margaret Chanler Aldrich (1870–1963)
20. Robert Winthrop Chanler (1872–1930)
21. Peter Augustus Jay (1877–1933)
22. Waldorf Astor (1879–1952)
23. James Roosevelt "Tadd" Roosevelt Jr. (1879–1958)
24. Marshall Orme Wilson Jr. (1885–1966)
25. John Jacob Astor V (1886–1971)
26. William Vincent Astor (1891–1959)
27. Louis Zborowski (1895–1924)
28. Theodore Chanler (1902–1961)
29. Ava Alice Muriel Astor (1902–1956)
30. Jimmy Van Alen (1902–1991)
31. William Waldorf "Bill" Astor II (1907–1966)
32. Francis David Langhorne Astor (1912–2001)
33. John Jacob "Jakey" Astor VI (1912–1992)
34. Michael Langhorne Astor (1916–1980)
35. Susan Mary Jay (1918–2004)
36. John Jacob "Jakie" Astor VII (1918–2000)
37. Gavin Astor (1918–1984)
38. John Astor (1923–1987)
39. Prince Ivan Sergeyevich Obolensky (1925–2019)
40. Princess Sylvia Sergeyevna Obolensky (1931–1997)
41. Simon Bowes-Lyon (born 1932)
42. Jane Heathcote-Drummond-Willoughby, 28th Baroness Willoughby de Eresby (born 1938)
43. John Jacob "Johnny" Astor VIII (born 1946)
44. William Waldorf Astor III (born 1951)
45. John Dalrymple, 14th Earl of Stair (born 1961)

== Spouses by birth order ==
1. Vincent Rumpff (1789–1867): husband of Eliza Astor
2. Franklin Hughes Delano (1813–1893): husband of Laura Eugenia Astor
3. Samuel Cutler "Sam" Ward (1814–1884): husband of Emily Astor
4. John Winthrop Chanler (1826–1877): husband and widower of Margaret Astor Ward
5. Caroline Webster Schermerhorn (1830–1908): widow of William Backhouse Astor Jr.
6. James John Van Alen (1848–1923): husband and widower of Emily Astor
7. Augustus Jay (1850–1919): husband of Emily Astor Kane
8. James Roosevelt "Rosey" Roosevelt Sr. (1854–1927): husband and widower of Helen Schermerhorn Astor
9. Count William Eliot Morris Zborowski (1858–1903): second husband of Margaret Laura Astor Carey
10. Marshall Orme Wilson (1860–1926): husband of Caroline Schermerhorn Astor
11. John Jay Chapman (1862–1933): husband of Elizabeth Astor Winthrop Chanler
12. Richard Aldrich (1863–1937): husband of Margaret Livingston Chanler
13. Amélie Louise Rives (1863–1945): wife of John Armstrong Chaloner
14. Ava Lowle Willing (1868–1958): first wife of John Jacob "Jack" Astor IV
15. Harriet Sylvia Ann Howland Green(1871–1951): wife and widow of Matthew Astor Wilks
16. Natalina Cavalieri (1874–1944): second wife of Robert Winthrop Chanler
17. Herbert Henry Spender-Clay (1875–1937): husband of Pauline Astor
18. Margaret Louise Post (1876–1969): wife and widow of James Laurens Van Alen
19. Robert Joseph Collier (1876–1918): husband of Sarah Steward Van Alen
20. Nancy Witcher Langhorne (1879–1964): widow of Waldorf Astor; first female British MP to sit in the house of commons
21. Minnie W. Collins (1880–1946): widow of William Astor "Willie" Chanler
22. Julia Lynch Olin (1882–1961): second wife and widow of Lewis Stuyvesant Chanler
23. Theodore Douglas Robinson (1883–1934): husband of Helen Rebecca Roosevelt
24. Lawrence Grant White (1887–1956): husband of Laura Astor Chanler
25. Violet Mary Elliot-Murray-Kynynmound (1889–1965): wife of John Jacob Astor V
26. Prince Sergei Platonovich Obolensky Neledinsky-Meletzky (1890–1978), first husband of Ava Alice Muriel Astor
27. Helen Dinsmore Huntington (1893–1976): first wife and widow of William Vincent Astor
28. Madeleine Talmage Force (1893–1940): second wife and widow of John Jacob "Jack" Astor IV
29. Louis Bancel LaFarge (1900–1989): husband and widower of Hester Alida Emmet
30. Roberta Brooke Russell (1902–2007): third wife and widow of William Vincent Astor
31. The Hon. Sir David Bowes Lyon (1902–1961): husband of Rachel Pauline Spender-Clay
32. Mary Benedict "Minnie" Cushing (1906–1978): second wife of William Vincent Astor
33. John Aylmer Dalrymple, 13th Earl of Stair (1906-1996): husband of Davina Katherine Bowes-Lyon
34. Gilbert James Heathcote-Drummond-Willoughby, 3rd Earl of Ancaster (1907–1983): husband and widower of Nancy Phyllis Louise Astor
35. Joseph Wright Alsop V (1910–1989): second husband of Susan Mary Jay
36. Irene Violet Freesia Janet Augusta Haig (1919–2001): widow of Gavin Astor
37. Hon. Sarah Kathleen Elinor Norton (1920–2013): first wife of William Waldorf "Bill" Astor II
38. Janet Bronwen Alun Pugh (1930–2017): third wife and widow of William Waldorf "Bill" Astor II
39. Roderick McEwen (1932–1982): husband of Romana von Hofmannsthal
40. Annabel Lucy Veronica Jones (born 1948): wife of William Waldorf Astor III, mother-in-law of British PM David Cameron
41. Elizabeth Constance "Liz" Mackintosh (born 1950): second wife of John Jacob "Johnny" Astor VIII
42. Jools Miles Holland (born 1958): second husband of Christabel Mary McEwen
43. Charles Henry Gordon-Lennox, 11th Duke of Richmond (born 1955): husband of Janet Elizabeth Astor
44. Edward Richard Lambton, 7th Earl of Durham (born 1961): first husband of Christabel Mary McEwen
45. Laura Rose Parker Bowles (born 1978): wife of Harry Marcus George Lopes

== Lines of succession to the family titles ==
Both in the Peerage of the United Kingdom, the titles Viscount Astor, of Hever Castle in the County of Kent (1917), with subsidiary title Baron Astor, of Hever Castle in the County of Kent (1916), and Baron Astor of Hever, of Hever Castle in the County of Kent (1956), were granted with the standard remainder to the legitimate male heirs of the bodies of the original grantees.

Both then-current titleholders continued to sit in the House of Lords following the expulsion of the majority of the hereditary peers by the House of Lords Act 1999, with Viscount Astor continuing to sit in the Lords until the removal of all remaining hereditary peers by the House of Lords (Hereditary Peers) Act 2026.

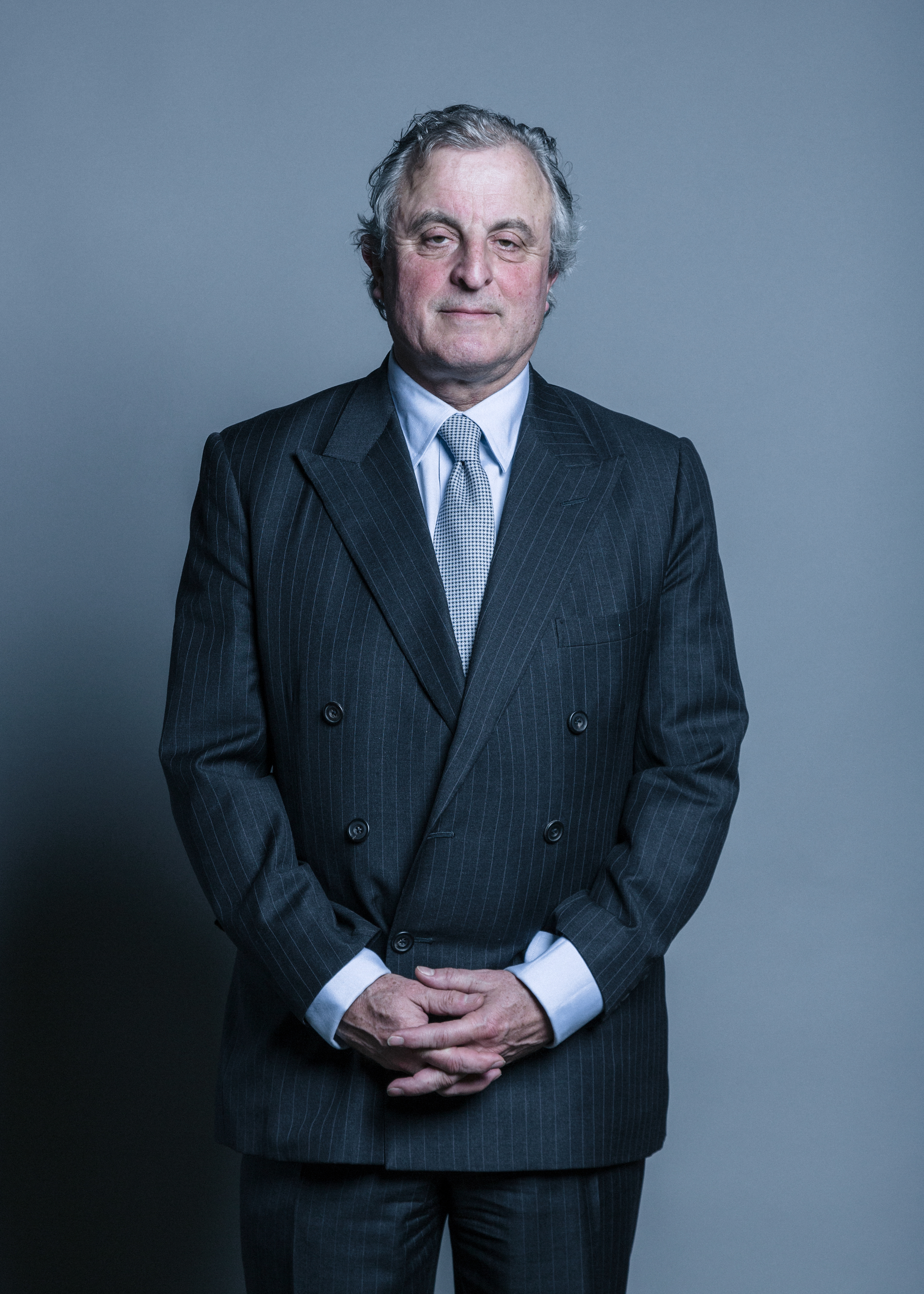
Viscount Astor's Official Parliamentary Portrait

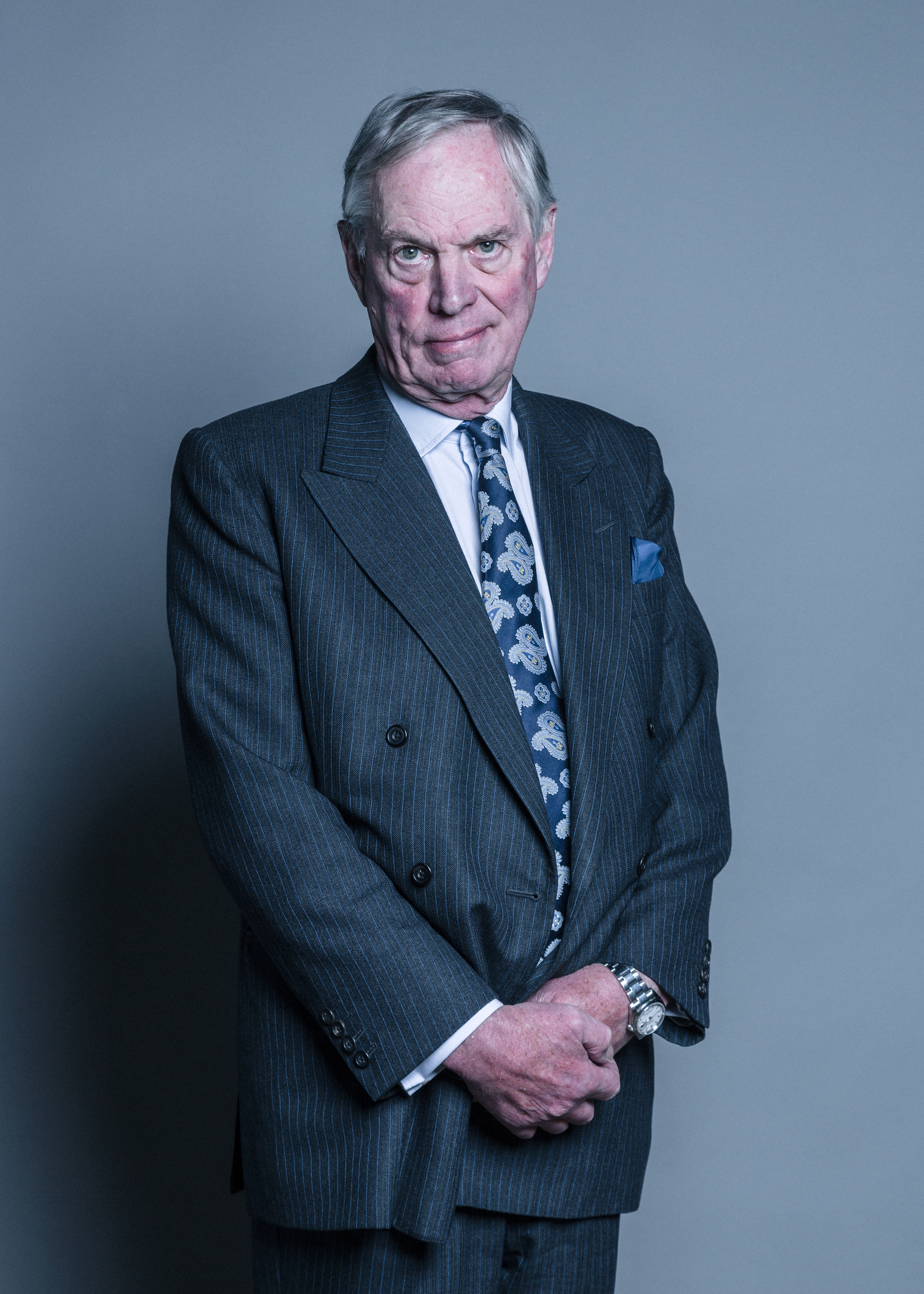
Lord Astor of Hever's Official Parliamentary Portrait

Coat of arms of Astor of Hever family

- The Right Hon. William Waldorf Astor, 1st Viscount Astor (1848–1919)
  - The Right Hon. Waldorf Astor, 2nd Viscount Astor, DL (1879–1952)
    - The Right Hon. William Waldorf Astor, 3rd Viscount Astor (1907–1966)
      - The Right Hon. William Waldorf Astor, 4th Viscount Astor (born 1951)
        - (1) The Hon. William Waldorf Astor (b. 1979)
          - (2) William Waldorf Astor (b. 2012)
          - (3) Conrad Charles Astor (b. 2016)
        - (4) The Hon. James Jacob Astor (b. 1981)
    - The Hon. Francis David Langhorne Astor, CH (1912–2001)
      - (5) Richard David Langhorne Astor (b. 1955)
      - (6) Thomas Robert Langhorne Astor (b. 1962)
    - The Hon. Michael Langhorne Astor (1916–1980)
      - (7) David Waldorf Astor (b. 1943)
        - (8) Henry Waldorf Astor (b. 1969)
          - (9) George Astor (b. 1998)
          - (10) Jakie Astor (b. 2003)
          - (11) Charles Edgar Spence Astor (b. 2007)
          - (12) Michael Allstar Astor (b. 2009)
        - (13) Thomas Ludovic David Astor (b. 1972)
          - (14) Frederick Michael Astor (b. 2003)
          - (15) Vincent David Astor (b. 2009)
      - (16) James Colonsay Langhorne Astor (b. 1945)
        - (17) Tobias Michael de Chazal Astor (b. 1980)
          - (18) Griffith Charles William Astor (b. 2016)
    - Major The Hon. Sir John Jacob Astor, MBE, ERD (1918–2000)
      - (19) Michael Ramon Langhorne Astor (b. 1946)
        - (20) James Edward Astor (b. 1976)
  - The Right Hon. Lt-Col John Jacob Astor, 1st Baron Astor of Hever, DL (1886–1971)
    - The Right Hon. Gavin Astor, 2nd Baron Astor of Hever (1918–1984)
      - (21) The Right Hon. John Jacob Astor, 3rd Baron Astor of Hever, PC, DL (b. 1946)
        - (1, 22) The Hon. Charles Gavin John Astor (b. 1990)
      - (2, 23) The Hon. Philip Douglas Paul Astor (b. 1959)
    - Lt-Col The Hon. Hugh Waldorf Astor (1920–1999)
      - (3, 24) Robert Hugh Astor (b. 1958)
        - (4, 25) Nicholas Louis Robert Astor (b. 1996)
        - (5, 26) Jonathan Hugh Astor (b. 1997)
      - (6, 27) James Alexander Waldorf Astor (b. 1965)
        - (7, 28) Alexander Richard Astor (b. 2000)
    - The Hon. John Astor (1923–1987)
      - John Richard Astor (1953–2016)
        - (8, 29) Charles John Astor (b. 1982)
      - (9, 30) George David Astor (b. 1958)
        - (10, 31) Thomas David Astor (b. 1987)

== Network ==
=== Businesses ===
The following is a list of companies in which the Astor family have held a controlling or otherwise substantial interest.

- American Fur Company
- Astor Court Apartment
- Bull's Head Tavern
- Gallatin National Bank
- Hotel New Netherland
- Manhattan Company
- Mohawk & Hudson Railroad
- Newsweek
- The Observer
- OKA Direct
- Pacific Fur Company
- The Pall Mall Gazette
- Park Hotel
- Silvergate Media
- South West Company
- St. Regis Hotel
- The Sunday Times
- The Times of London
- Vanderbilt Hotel
- Waldorf-Astoria (1893–1929)
- Waldorf Hotel

=== Philanthropy and non-profit organizations ===
- Astor of Hever Trust
- Astor Home for Children
- Astor Library
- Astor Memorial School
- Brooke Astor Fund for New York City Education
- Cliveden Set
- Coaching Club of New York
- The Four Hundred
- Florida Yacht Club
- Koestler Trust
- New York Cancer Hospital
- Rothermere American Institute
- St. Margaret's Home
- Saint Nicholas Society of the City of New York
- Vincent Astor Foundation

== Estates and historic sites ==
- 130 East 80th Street House
- The Abbey, Sutton Courtenay
- The Apthorp
- Astor Court
- Astor Fur Warehouse
- Astor Row
- Astor, Florida
- Beaulieu House
- Beechwood
- Cliveden
- Ferncliff Farm
- Ferncliff Forest
- Ferry Reach
- Fort Astoria
- Ginge Manor
- Graham Court
- Hatley Park
- Hellgate
- Hever Castle
- Knickerbocker Building
- Manor House, Sutton Courtenay
- Mrs. William B. Astor House
- Nuits (Irvington, New York)
- Rokeby (Barrytown, New York)
- Steen Valetje
- Two Temple Place
- Wilks Building
