= Lady Astor (disambiguation) =

Lady Astor commonly refers to Nancy Astor, Viscountess Astor (1879–1964).

Lady Astor may also refer to:

== Viscountess Astor ==
- Sarah Baring (1920–2013), 1st wife of the 3rd Viscount Astor
- Phillipa Victoria Hunloke, 2nd wife of William Astor, 3rd Viscount Astor
- Bronwen Astor (1930–2017), 3rd wife of the 3rd Viscount
- Annabel Astor, Viscountess Astor (born 1948), wife of William Astor, 4th Viscount Astor

== Baroness Astor of Hever ==
- Violet Astor (1889–1965), wife of John Jacob Astor, 1st Baron Astor of Hever
- Irene Astor, Baroness Astor of Hever (1919–2001), wife of Gavin Astor, 2nd Baron Astor of Hever
- Fiona Diana Lennox-Harvey, 1st wife of John Astor, 3rd Baron Astor of Hever
- Liz Astor, Baroness Astor of Hever (born 1950), 2nd wife of 3rd Baron

== See also ==
- Lord Astor (disambiguation)
