= Lord Astor =

Lord Astor is a title that can refer to the male holder of one of the following peerages.

- Baron Astor of Hever
- Viscount Astor

== See also ==
- Lady Astor (disambiguation)
