= Roger Harvey =

English soldier and public official

Captain Roger Harvey DL JP

High Sheriff of Wiltshire
- In office 1970–1970
- Preceded by: Edward Lancelot Luce
- Succeeded by: James Ian Morrison

Personal details
- Born: Roger Edward Lennox Harvey; 6 April 1913 Horsham, West Sussex
- Died: 10 October 1976 (aged 63) London
- Spouse: Diana Eira Claude Mainwaring (m. 1938; died 1976)
- Children: Carola Zara Lennox Harvey; Joanna Lennox Harvey; Fiona Diana Lennox Harvey
- Parent(s): Edward Douglas Lennox Harvey; Emma Rawson Thornton

Captain Roger Edward Lennox Harvey (Note: Harvey is sometimes referred to as Roger Lennox Edward Harvey.) DL JP (6 April 1913 – 10 October 1976) was an English soldier and public official.

== Early life ==
Harvey was born on 6 April 1913 in Horsham, West Sussex. He was the youngest of four sons of the Rev. Edward Douglas Lennox Harvey (1839–1938), OBE, of Beedingwood House, Horsham, and his second wife, Emma Jessie (née Rawson) Thornton (1867–1943), the younger daughter of Philip Rawson of Woodhurst, Crawley and widow of Sir Edward Thornton, 3rd Count of Cacilhas. All three of his elder half-brothers died early and tragic deaths.

His father was the youngest of seven sons of William James Harvey of Carnousie, and Isobel Barclay (a daughter of Charles Barclay of Inchbrown, County of Moray).

== Career ==
Harvey was commissioned in the Scots Guards in 1933, eventually becoming Captain. During World War II, he served in Egypt from 1939 to 1945. He held the office of Deputy Lieutenant of Wiltshire in 1963, and High Sheriff of Wiltshire in 1970, and Justice of the Peace.

== Personal life ==
On 6 July 1938, Harvey was married to Diana Eira Claude Mainwaring (1914–1992) at Westminster, London. Diana was a daughter of Sir Harry Mainwaring, 5th Baronet, and the former Generis Alma Windham Williams-Bulkeley (a daughter of Sir Richard Williams-Bulkeley, 12th Baronet and Lady Magdalen Yorke). He lived at Parliament Piece, located on the edge of the village of Ramsbury, which sits in the Kennet Valley in the North Wessex close to the Wiltshire and Berkshire border. They were the parents of two daughters:

- Carola Zara Lennox Harvey (b. 1941), who married John Gerald Robertson Williams, only son of Gerald Williams, of Crockham House, Westerham, in 1962. They divorced in 1980.
- Joanna Lennox Harvey (1946–2022), who married Frederick Minshull Stockdale, son of Sir Edmund Stockdale, 1st Baronet and Hon. Louise Fermor-Hesketh (a daughter of Thomas Fermor-Hesketh, 1st Baron Hesketh), in 1970. They divorced in 1989.
- Fiona Diana Lennox Harvey (b. 1949), who married John Jacob Astor VIII, eldest son of Gavin Astor, 2nd Baron Astor of Hever, and Lady Irene Haig (a daughter of Douglas Haig, 1st Earl Haig), in 1970. Before their divorce in 1990, Astor succeeded his father as the 3rd Baron Astor of Hever in 1984.

Captain Harvey died in London on 10 October 1976. His widow died in 1992 at Salisbury, Wiltshire.
