= Asror =

Asror is a masculine given name. Notable people with the name include:

- Asror Aliqulov (born 1978), Uzbekistani footballer
- Asror Vohidov (born 1995), Tajikistani boxer

== See also ==
- Astor (surname)
