= Baron Astor of Hever =

Title in the Peerage of the United Kingdom

Arms of Baron Astor of Hever (a difference of Viscount Astor): Argent eight barrulets sable, a falcon gules resting on a dexter hand couped at the wrist proper gauntleted of the third in chief two fleurs-de-lis of the last; crest: On a mount vert a falcon rising proper ensigned by three mullets or; supporters: dexter: The figure of Æsculapius proper; sinister: The figure of Mercury proper; motto: Ad Astra ("to the stars")

Baron Astor of Hever, of Hever Castle in the County of Kent, is a title in the Peerage of the United Kingdom. It was created in 1956 for John Jacob Astor V, a prominent newspaper proprietor and Conservative politician. He was the fourth child of William Waldorf Astor, 1st Viscount Astor. Lord Astor of Hever was succeeded in 1971 by his eldest son, the second Baron, who served as Lord Lieutenant of Kent between 1972 and 1982.

As of 2019, the title is held by the latter's eldest son, the third Baron, who succeeded in 1984. He is one of the ninety elected hereditary peers who remain in the House of Lords after the passing of the House of Lords Act of 1999, and he sits on the Conservative benches. As a male-line descendant of the first Viscount Astor, Lord Astor of Hever is also in remainder to this peerage and its subsidiary title Baron Astor, of Hever Castle in the County of Kent.

John Astor, third son of the first Baron, served as a Conservative Member of Parliament from 1964 to 1974.

== Barons Astor of Hever (1956) ==
- John Jacob Astor, 1st Baron Astor of Hever (1886–1971)
- Gavin Astor, 2nd Baron Astor of Hever (1918–1984)
- John Jacob Astor, 3rd Baron Astor of Hever (b. 1946)

The heir apparent is the present holder's son, Hon. Charles Gavin John Astor (b. 1990).

== See also ==
- Viscount Astor
- Astor family
