= West Ginge =

Hamlet in Oxfordshire, England

Coordinates: 51.5755°N 1.3559°W

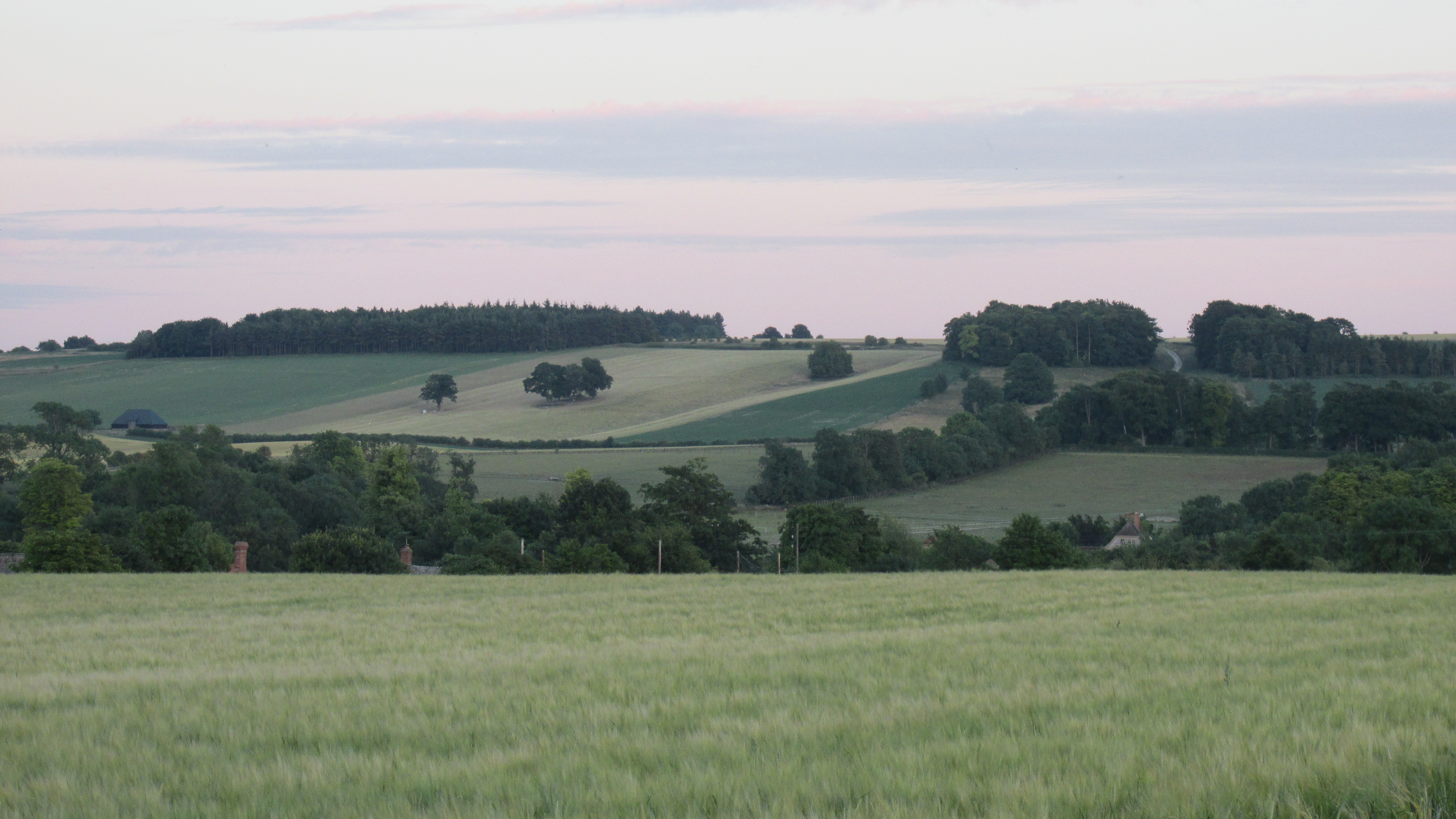
- West Ginge and farmland

- Location within Oxfordshire
- Civil parish: Ardington
- District: Vale of White Horse
- Shire county: Oxfordshire
- Region: South East
- Country: England
- Sovereign state: United Kingdom
- Post town: Wantage
- Postcode district: OX12
- Dialling code: 01235
- Police: Thames Valley
- Fire: Oxfordshire
- Ambulance: South Central
- UK Parliament: Wantage
- Website: Ardington and Lockinge Parish Council

West Ginge is a hamlet within the civil parish of Ardington in the English county of Oxfordshire (formerly Berkshire), 3.9 miles (6.3 km) by road to the southeast of Wantage. West Ginge is immediately next to the hamlet of East Ginge, which is contained within the parish of West Hendred. West Ginge is more populous than East Ginge, which is dominated by farm buildings, and the two hamlets are often simply referred to as Ginge.

== Geography ==
A chalk stream Ginge Brook begins in the hamlet, which continues northward to Sutton Courtenay and Steventon to join the River Thames near Abingdon.

== Manor ==
Ginge Manor or Ginge Manor House is a manor house that became a Grade II listed building on 25 October 1951. It is the family seat of the Viscount Astor and is currently occupied by William Astor, 4th Viscount Astor and his wife Annabel Astor, Viscountess Astor, who is the mother of Samantha Cameron, the wife of the former British Prime Minister David Cameron. The estate includes a "magnificent manor" house and servant quarters, which is a "humble" three bedroom cottage, amongst several other features including several barns and old farm cottages.

Several of the barns in the area have been converted into residences. The estate has gardens, an outdoor swimming pool and a tennis court. The current manor house dates to the early 17th century, square and is built from red brick, with an early 18th-century cross-wing on the left side and a 20th-century extension on the right wing. The rear has a six-panel door framed with wooden Doric pilasters. The interior features a "dog-leg staircase with barley-sugar twist and fluted balusters, moulded handrail and panelled dado."

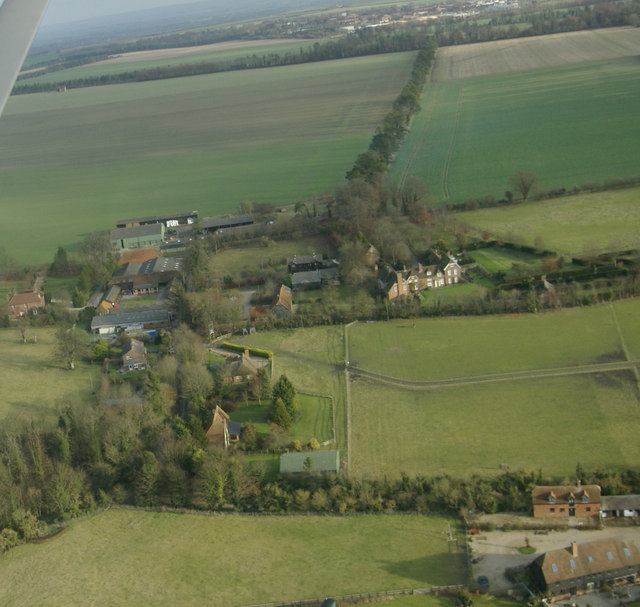
Aerial photo of East Ginge

== History ==
A manor at Ginge was mentioned in the Domesday Book of 1086 and stated to be under the patronage of Abingdon Abbey, and both were then and for many centuries afterwards part of the county of Berkshire. In the time of the Saxons the lands belonged to three proprietors of the name of Selva, Topius, and Borda; and at the General Survey to Robert de Gernon, or Grino, whose son and heir was William de Montfitchet, Head of the Barony of Stansted.

Upon his death, in the reign of Henry II, William's son Gilbert de Montfitchet was said to have "granted half the Manor of Ginges (with the exception of the outer wood called Westfrid) with all its appurtenances to God and Saint Mary, Saint John the Baptist, and the poor of the holy house of the Hospital of Jerusalem, and the brethren in the same house, serving God, in free and pure alms", meaning that he ceded half of the manor to the church. His son Richard, seems to have given the Brethren the other part of this Manor, for in King John's Confirmation Charter it says, "The Vill of Ginnges with the Church and all its appurtenances."

During the time of Edward I and Eleanor of Castile in the 1260s it was known to have been owned by Robert, son of Andrew le Blund. It is mentioned again in 1431, when it was owned by Alice, the wife of Walter Gyffard, who passed it onto her son William Gyffard upon her death on 24 April 1431. In 1614, the manor was sold by Sir John Horton and his wife Lady Jane, daughter of Serjeant Hanham of Wimbourne for £1400 to Minister Benedict Winchombe of Noke, Oxfordshire. Ginge was accidentally bombed in World War II by a German bomber. The pilot believed that he was unloading ammunition onto open countryside after an attack on London, but instead struck houses in the hamlet.
