= John Jacob Astor, 1st Baron Astor of Hever =

English baron and newspaper proprietor (1886–1971)

Lieutenant Colonel The Right Honourable The Lord Astor of Hever DL
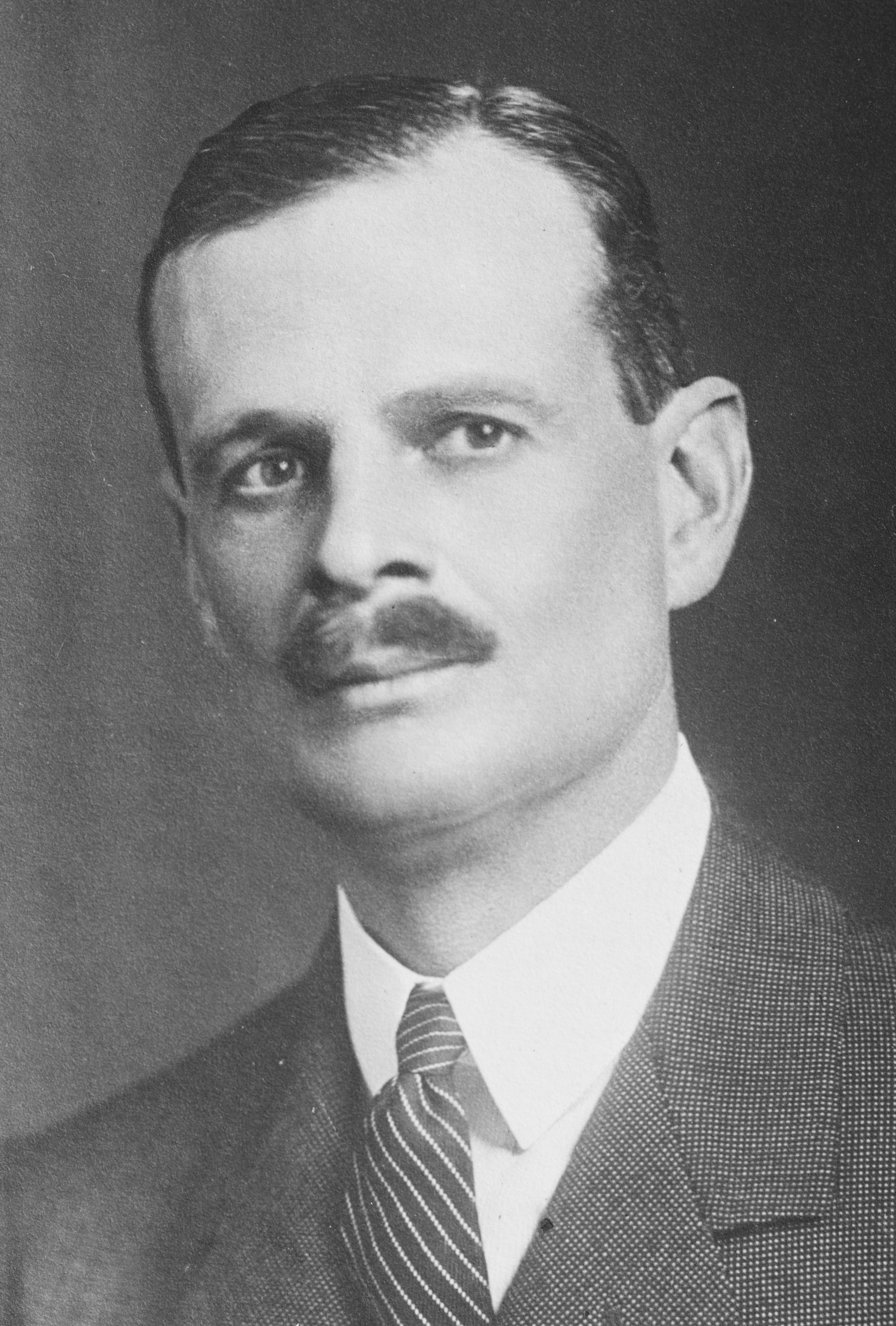
- John Jacob Astor V, 1st Baron Astor of Hever

Member of the House of Lords Lord Temporal
- In office 21 March 1956 – 19 July 1971; Hereditary Peerage
- Preceded by: Peerage created
- Succeeded by: The 2nd Lord Astor of Hever

Member of Parliament for Dover
- In office 15 November 1922 – 15 June 1945
- Preceded by: Sir Thomas Polson
- Succeeded by: John Thomas

Personal details
- Born: 20 May 1886 Manhattan, New York City, U.S.
- Died: 19 July 1971 (aged 85) Cannes, France
- Party: Conservative
- Spouse: Lady Violet Mary Elliot-Murray-Kynynmound (m. 1916; died 1965)
- Children: Gavin Astor; Hugh Waldorf Astor; John Astor
- Parent(s): William Waldorf Astor; Mary Dahlgren Paul
- Relatives: See Astor family
- Education: Eton College; New College, Oxford

Lieutenant-Colonel John Jacob Astor V, 1st Baron Astor of Hever, DL (20 May 1886 – 19 July 1971) was an American-born English newspaper proprietor, politician, sportsman, and military officer. He was a member of the Astor family.

== Early life ==
John Jacob Astor V was born in Manhattan, New York City in 1886, the fourth child of William Waldorf Astor, 1st Viscount Astor (1848–1919), and Mary Dahlgren Paul (1858–1894). He was five years old when his family left New York to live in England. He was raised on an estate purchased by his father at Cliveden-on-Thames in Buckinghamshire. He was educated at Eton College and at New College, Oxford. Astor was British Public Schools rackets champion in 1904–1905, spent a year at Oxford, and finally, in 1906, joined the 1st Life Guards.

Olympic medal record

Representing the United Kingdom

Men's rackets
Gold medal – first place	1908 London	Men's doubles
Bronze medal – third place	1908 London	Men's singles

== Career ==
Astor represented Great Britain in rackets at the 1908 Summer Olympics, winning the gold medal in the men's doubles competition together with Vane Pennell and winning bronze in the men's singles event. In the same year he played singles and doubles in the British Army rackets championships. He was then Aide-de-Camp to Baron Hardinge, Viceroy of India between 1911 and 1914 and was promoted captain in 1913.

=== First World War ===
In World War I, he was wounded while serving with his regiment at Messines in October 1914. After recovering, he returned to the Western Front, returning briefly to marry Lady Violet Mary Elliot-Murray-Kynynmound on 28 August 1916.

At the start of 1918, he was put in command of the 520 Household Siege Battery of the Royal Garrison Artillery, his bravery with that unit earning him the rank of Chevalier in France's Légion d'Honneur. In September that year, near Cambrai, his right leg was shattered by a shell and later amputated, though he was still able to play and win against younger opponents at squash on a prosthetic limb.

=== 1919-1949 ===
Upon his father's death in 1919, Astor inherited Hever Castle, near Edenbridge, Kent, where he lived the life of an English country gentleman. He was promoted to major in the Army in 1920. In 1922, he purchased The Times newspaper following the death of its owner, Alfred Harmsworth, 1st Viscount Northcliffe. He was a director of the Great Western Railway (1929–1946), Hambros Bank (1934–1960) and Barclays Bank (1942–1952).

In addition to his directorships and newspaper business, John Jacob V served in politics as Alderman of the London County Council between 1922 and 1925 and in the Parliament of the United Kingdom for 23 years as Unionist Member of Parliament (MP) for Dover from 1922 to 1945. In March 1924, Astor caused the 1924 Dover by-election to be held after having voted before taking the oath of allegiance - doing so means an MP's seat is vacated "as if he were dead". He was returned unopposed just six days after losing his seat. In 1926, he was made lieutenant of the City of London, then held the offices of Justice of the Peace from 1929 and Deputy Lieutenant of Kent from 1936 until 1962.

In 1927, he was appointed honorary colonel of the Kent and Sussex Heavy Regiment, Royal Artillery, a post he held until 1946, then honorary colonel of the 23rd London Regiment in 1928, holding that post until 1949. During World War II, he also became lieutenant-colonel of the 5th Battalion, City of London Home Guard, a unit drawn from newspaper employees, between 1940 and 1944.

=== Middlesex Hospital ===
John Astor was a great benefactor of the Middlesex Hospital, London W 1, both financially and in service given. He was a member of its board of governors for 40 years and the board's chairman for 24 years. He also endowed the chair of physiology in 1920 and gave the money for the Nurses' Home in Foley Street, which survived the demolition of the hospital. For many years, the name of the donor was unknown, but it was later named John Astor House in his honour. He gave money towards the Windeyer Building of the Medical School and Astor College, the medical students' residence.

=== 1950s ===
In the 1950s, Astor became Chairman of Phoenix Insurance (1952–1958), having previously served as its vice-chairman (1941–1952). In 1953, he had The Times sponsor Edmund Hillary's expedition that made the first successful climb to the summit of Mount Everest and became the first chairman of the newly established General Council of the Press, a post he held until resigning due to ill-health in April 1955.

On 21 January 1956, he was created Baron Astor of Hever, of Hever Castle in the County of Kent, taking his seat in the House of Lords on 21 March. He remained chairman of The Times until 1959 when his son Gavin took over, seven years before it was sold to Canadian newspaper tycoon, Roy Thomson.

== Personal life ==
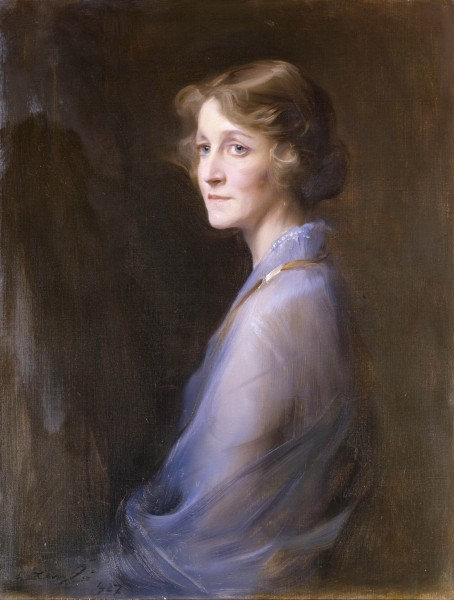
Portrait of Lady Astor, by Philip de László, 1927

On 28 August 1916, Astor married Lady Violet Mary Elliot-Murray-Kynynmound (1889–1965), the third daughter of Gilbert Elliot-Murray-Kynynmound, 4th Earl of Minto and his wife, Lady Mary Caroline Grey. From her previous marriage to Major Lord Charles George Francis Mercer Nairne Petty-Fitzmaurice, who was killed in action at Ypres in 1914, Lady Violet had two children, Margaret and George. Lord and Lady Astor had three sons:

- Gavin Astor, 2nd Baron Astor of Hever (1918–1984), who married Lady Irene Haig, youngest daughter of Douglas Haig, 1st Earl Haig, and Dorothy Maud Vivian, and had five children including John Jacob "Johnny" Astor VIII.
- Lt Col Hugh Waldorf Astor (1920–1999), who married Emily Lucy Kinloch, a niece of Diana Vreeland, and had five children.
- John Astor (1923–1987), who married Diana Kathleen Drummond, a grandniece of Herbert Samuel Holt, and had three children.

In 1962, he moved from England to France. He died on 19 July 1971 in Cannes, France. Selected artworks from the family's vast collection were bequeathed to the National Gallery including the prized "Thames below Westminster" by Claude Monet. John Jacob V and Violet are buried together on the grounds of Hever Castle, and his eldest son Gavin succeeded him as Baron.

=== Descendants ===
Through his son Gavin, he is a great-grandfather of Harry Marcus George Lopes (b. 1977), who married Laura Rose Parker Bowles, the second child of Andrew Parker Bowles and Queen Camilla, thus making her the stepdaughter of King Charles III.

Parliament of the United Kingdom
Preceded by Thomas Andrew Polson	Member of Parliament for Dover; 1922–1945	Succeeded by John Thomas
Peerage of the United Kingdom
New creation	Baron Astor of Hever; 1956–1971	Succeeded by Gavin Astor
Media offices
New office	Chairman of the General Council of the Press; 1953–1956	Succeeded by Linton Andrews
