= Gavin Astor, 2nd Baron Astor of Hever =

English soldier and publisher (1918–1984)

The Right Honourable The Lord Astor of Hever DL
- Gavin Astor, 2nd Baron Astor of Hever

Member of the House of Lords Lord Temporal
- In office 19 July 1971 – 28 June 1984; Hereditary Peerage
- Preceded by: The 1st Lord Astor of Hever
- Succeeded by: The 3rd Lord Astor of Hever

Personal details
- Born: 1 June 1918
- Died: 28 June 1984 (aged 66) near Tarland, Aberdeenshire, Scotland
- Spouse: Lady Irene Haig (m. 1945; died 1984)
- Children: John Astor, 3rd Baron Astor of Hever; Bridget Mary Astor; Elizabeth Louise Astor; Sarah Violet Astor; Philip Douglas Paul Astor
- Parent(s): John Jacob Astor, 1st Baron Astor of Hever; Violet Elliot-Murray-Kynynmound
- Relatives: See Astor family
- Education: Eton College
- Alma mater: New College, Oxford

Gavin Astor, 2nd Baron Astor of Hever DL (1 June 1918 – 28 June 1984), was an English soldier, publisher, peer, and member of the Astor family. Lord Astor served as chairman of the Times Publishing Company and president of the family owned Times Newspapers Ltd.

In 1955, he founded the Astor of Hever Trust, a charity that makes grants to arts, medicine, religion, education, conservation, youth, and sport organisations.

== Early life ==
Astor was born on 1 June 1918. He was the eldest son of the American born John Jacob Astor, 1st Baron Astor of Hever, and Lady Violet Elliot-Murray-Kynynmound. He had two younger brothers, Hugh and John. His mother had two children, Mary and George (8th Marquess of Lansdowne), from her previous marriage to Lord Charles Petty-Fitzmaurice.

His father, the fourth child of William Waldorf Astor, 1st Viscount Astor and Mary Dahlgren Paul, was only five years old when his family left New York to live in England. His mother was the third of the five children of Gilbert Elliot-Murray-Kynynmound, 4th Earl of Minto, Viceroy and Governor-General of India and Governor General of Canada, and Mary Caroline Grey (a daughter of Gen. Charles Grey, the second son of Charles Grey, 2nd Earl Grey).

He was educated at Eton College and New College, Oxford.

== Career ==
After Oxford, Astor joined the Life Guards, where he reached the rank of captain.

Business positions included the chairmanship of the Times Publishing Company and life presidency of Times Newspapers Ltd, succeeding his father in 1959. He was appointed High Sheriff of Sussex in 1955.

Upon the death of his father in 1971, he inherited the barony and Hever Castle in Kent, which the family opened to tours in 1963. In 1983, Astor sold the castle to John Guthrie, chairman of the family-run business, Broadland Properties Limited.

In 1955, he founded the Astor of Hever Trust, a charity aimed to collect donations for arts, medicine, religion, education, conservation, youth, and sport.

== Personal life ==
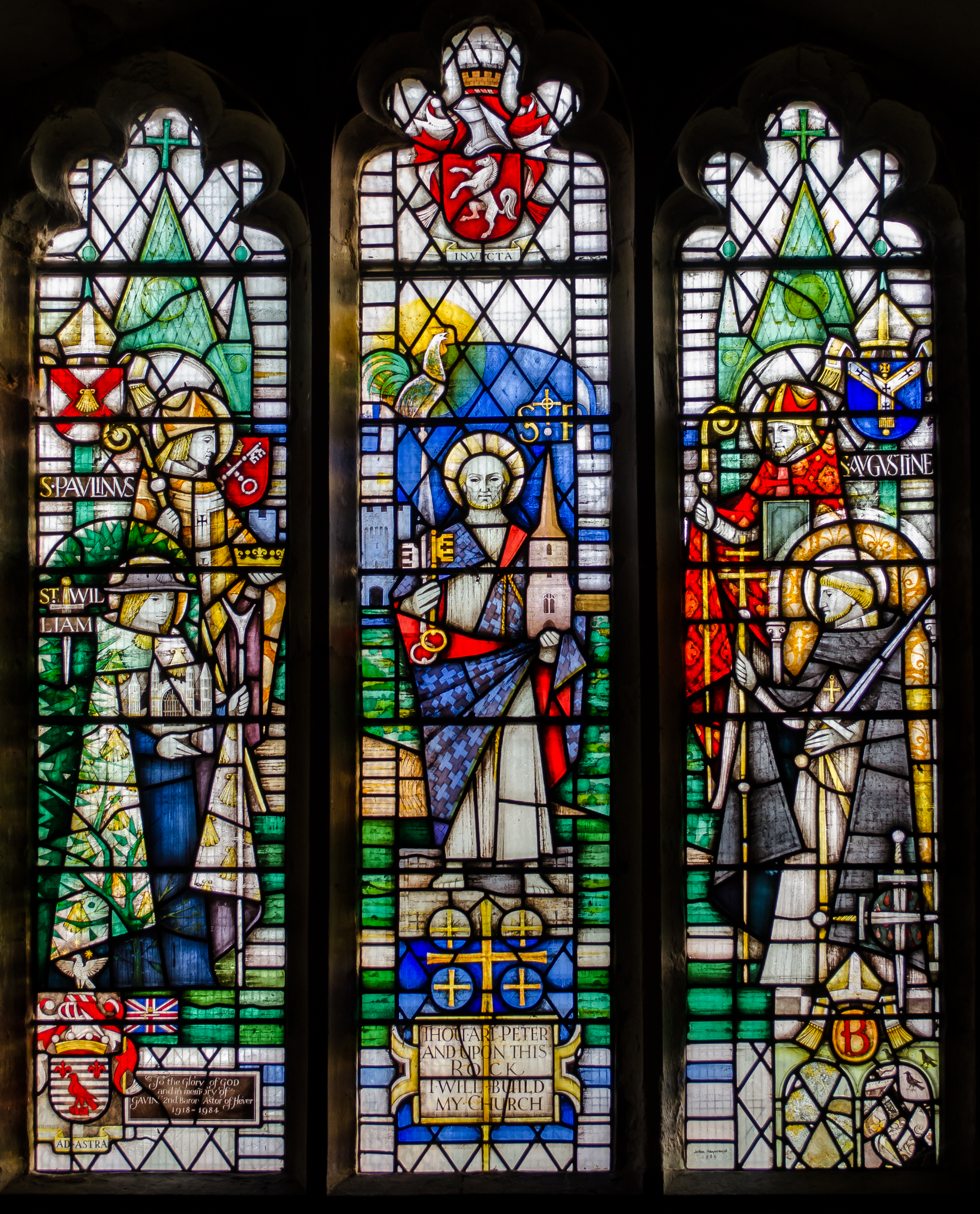
Memorial stained-glass window in St Peter's Church, Hever, to Gavin Astor, 2nd Baron Astor

On 4 October 1945, Astor married Lady Irene Haig (1919–2001), youngest daughter of the late Field Marshal Douglas Haig, 1st Earl Haig, and Dorothy Maud Vivian Haig. Together, they had five children:

- John Jacob "Johnny" Astor VIII, 3rd Baron Astor of Hever (b. 1946), who married Fiona Diana Harvey, a daughter of Capt. Roger Harvey, in 1970. They divorced in 1990 and he married Elizabeth Mackintosh, daughter of John Mackintosh, 2nd Viscount Mackintosh, in 1990.
- Hon. Bridget Nancy Astor (b. 1948), who married Count Arthur Tarnowski, son of Count Hieronim Tarnowski, in 1980. They divorced in 1986 and she married Geofrey Richard Smith, son of James William Smith, in 1989.
- Hon. Elizabeth Louise Astor (b. 1951), who married David John Shelton Herring in 1979. They divorced in 1981 and she married David Joseph Ward, son of Joseph Ward, in 1985.
- Hon. Sarah Violet Astor (b. 1953), who married Hon. George Lopes, a son of Massey Lopes, 2nd Baron Roborough, in 1975.
- Hon. Philip Douglas Paul Astor (b. 1959), a barrister who married Justine (née Picardie) MacColl, daughter of Michael Picardie, in 2012.

Astor died of cancer in 1984 at his home near Tarland, Scotland. He was succeeded in the barony by his eldest son Johnny.

=== Descendants ===
Through his daughter Sarah, he was a grandfather of Harry Marcus George Lopes (b. 1977), who married Laura Rose Parker Bowles, the second child of Andrew Parker Bowles and Camilla Shand (later Queen Camilla), thus making her the stepdaughter of King Charles III.

Honorary titles
Preceded by The Lord Cornwallis	Lord Lieutenant of Kent; 1972–1982	Succeeded by The Lord Kingsdown
Peerage of the United Kingdom
Preceded by John Jacob Astor	Baron Astor of Hever; 1971–1984	Succeeded by John Jacob Astor
