= Irene Astor, Baroness Astor of Hever =

English philanthropist

The Right Honourable The Lady Astor of Hever
- Born: Irene Violet Freesia Janet Augusta Haig; 7 October 1919; Belgravia, London, England
- Died: 12 August 2001 (aged 81)
- Spouse: Gavin Astor, 2nd Baron Astor of Hever (m. 1945; died 1984)
- Children: John Astor, 3rd Baron Astor of Hever; Bridget Smith; Elizabeth Louise Ward; Sarah Lopes; Philip Astor
- Parent(s): Douglas Haig, 1st Earl Haig; Dorothy Maud Vivian
- Relatives: Hussey Vivian, 3rd Baron Vivian (grandfather); George Haig, 2nd Earl Haig (brother)
- Family: Astor family

Irene Violet Freesia Janet Augusta Astor, Baroness Astor of Hever (née Haig; 7 October 1919 – 12 August 2001) was an English philanthropist and member of the Astor family. Her philanthropic contributions included being chairman of the Sunshine Fund for Blind Children from 1947 to 1989, during which she raised over £14 million, She served as vice president of the Royal National Institute for the Blind from 1977 to her death in 2001.

== Early life ==
Astor was born on 7 October 1919 at 27 Chesham Place in Belgravia, the youngest of four children of military officer and later Field Marshal Douglas Haig, 1st Earl Haig, and Dorothy Maud Vivian, a daughter of Hussey Vivian, 3rd Baron Vivian. Her father was created Earl Haig when she was 12 days old entitling her to the prefix Lady. Her elder siblings were Lady Alexandra Henrietta Louisa Haig (wife of Rear-Admiral Clarence Howard-Johnston and Hugh Trevor-Roper), Lady Victoria Doris Rachel Haig (wife of Col. Andrew Montagu Douglas Scott) and George Haig, 2nd Earl Haig.

== Career ==
During World War II she worked for the Red Cross, and was also involved in the Girls' Training Corps, leading a group of girls who turned the ruined site of 145 Piccadilly into an allotment.

Irene was chairman of the Sunshine Fund for Blind Children from 1947 to 1989. She raised over £14 million as chairman. From 1977 until her death, she served as vice president of the Royal National Institute for the Blind.

== Personal life ==
She married Gavin Astor, later the 2nd Baron Astor of Hever, the eldest son of John Jacob Astor, 1st Baron Astor of Hever, and Violet Mary Elliot-Murray-Kynynmound on 4 October 1945. She became Lady Astor of Hever when her husband succeeded to the barony on the death of his father in 1971. They had five children:

- John Astor, 3rd Baron Astor of Hever (born 1946), who married twice, first to Fiona Diana Lennox Harvey in 1970; the couple had three daughters and divorced in 1990. He married, secondly, Elizabeth Constance Mackintosh, daughter of John Mackintosh, 2nd Viscount Mackintosh of Halifax, in 1990; the couple have two children.
- Bridget Mary Astor (1948–2017), who married twice, first to Count Arthur Tarnowski in 1980; the couple had two sons before divorcing in 1986. Her second marriage was in 1989 to Geofrey Richard Smith; the couple had one daughter.
- Elizabeth "Louise" Astor (born 1951), who married twice, first to David John Shelton Herring in 1979; they divorced in 1981 and she married, secondly, David Joseph Ward in 1985; the couple have two children.
- Sarah Violet Astor (born 1953), who married George Edward Lopes, son of Massey Lopes, 2nd Baron Roborough, in 1975 and has three children; their son, Harry Marcus George Lopes, is married to Laura Rose Parker Bowles, daughter of Andrew Parker Bowles and Queen Camilla.
- Philip Douglas Paul Astor (born 1959), who was married in July 2012 to the writer Justine Picardie.

She died on 12 August 2001.
