= John Astor (1923–1987) =

British politician (1923–1987)

The Honourable John Astor

Member of Parliament for Newbury
- In office 15 October 1964 – 8 February 1974
- Preceded by: Anthony Hurd
- Succeeded by: Michael McNair-Wilson

Personal details
- Born: 26 September 1923
- Died: 27 December 1987 (aged 64) Inkpen, Berkshire, England
- Party: Conservative
- Spouses: Diana Kathleen Drummond (m. 1950; died 1982) Penelope Eve Bradford (m. 1982)
- Children: 3
- Parents: John Jacob Astor V; Violet Mary Elliot-Murray-Kynynmound
- Relatives: Astor family
- Education: Eton College

John Astor (26 September 1923 – 27 December 1987) was a British Conservative politician.

== Early life ==
John was the youngest of three sons born to John Jacob Astor V, 1st Baron Astor of Hever and Lady Violet Mary Elliot-Murray-Kynynmound. He had two elder brothers, Gavin Astor, who inherited his father's barony, and Hugh Astor. His mother had two children, Mary Petty-Fitzmaurice, and George Petty-Fitzmaurice, from her first marriage to Lord Charles Petty-Fitzmaurice who was killed in action at Ypres. His elder half-brother George later became the 8th Marquess of Lansdowne.

His paternal grandparents were American born William Waldorf Astor, 1st Viscount Astor, and his wife, Mary Dahlgren Paul. His maternal grandparents were Gilbert Elliot-Murray-Kynynmound, 4th Earl of Minto and his wife Lady Mary Caroline Grey.

He was educated at Summerfields and Eton College.

== Career ==
During World War II he served in the Royal Air Force Volunteer Reserve. He was a Berkshire County Councillor from 1953 and an alderman from 1960.

Astor was elected as a Conservative MP for Newbury in the 1964 general election. He was re-elected twice, in 1966 and 1970, but stood down before the first February 1974 general election. In 1970, he was appointed to the position of Parliamentary Private Secretary to the Minister of Overseas Development.

== Personal life ==
In 1950, he married Diana Kathleen Drummond, a daughter of George Henry Drummond and Helena Kathleen Holt. Helena was a niece of civil engineer Herbert Samuel Holt. They had three children.

In 1982, he married Penelope Eve Bradford. They lived at Kirby House, Inkpen, Berkshire. Astor died at Kirby House on 27 December 1987. Penelope died on 31 December 2006.

Parliament of the United Kingdom
Preceded by Anthony Hurd	Member of Parliament for Newbury; 1964 – February 1974	Succeeded by Michael McNair-Wilson
