= Liz Astor, Baroness Astor of Hever =

English author and activist

Elizabeth Constance Mackintosh, Baroness Astor of Hever (born 4 May 1950) is an English author and autism activist. She is the second wife of John Astor, 3rd Baron Astor of Hever.

== Family ==
Her parents are John Mackintosh, 2nd Viscount Mackintosh of Halifax, and Bronda Fibiger. She has one sister, Diana; and one half-brother, Charles, from Bronda's second marriage.

== Work ==
Liz Astor worked as a model and a head hunter before her marriage to Baron Astor. Astor has written two books, a memoir and a novel. Loving Olivia: Bringing Up My Autistic Daughter recounts her experience with younger daughter Olivia's autism. In Astor's novel, Since You Went Away, she fictionalized her mother's life story. She has done extensive charity work, focusing on raising funds for the Parkinsons UK and The National Autistic Society.

== Personal life ==
She has been married three times: Timothy Cutting; Nicolas Chagrin; and finally to Baron Astor in 1990. She married her current husband when her daughter Natalya was nine and became a stepmother to Astor's three daughters.

She has one daughter from her second marriage: Natalya Isabel Chagrin (born 1981), an actress.

Her two children with Astor are Charles Gavin John Astor (born 10 November 1990) and Olivia Alexandra Elizabeth Astor (born 21 August 1992).
