= John Astor, 3rd Baron Astor of Hever =

English businessman and politician

The Right Honourable The Lord Astor of Hever PC DL
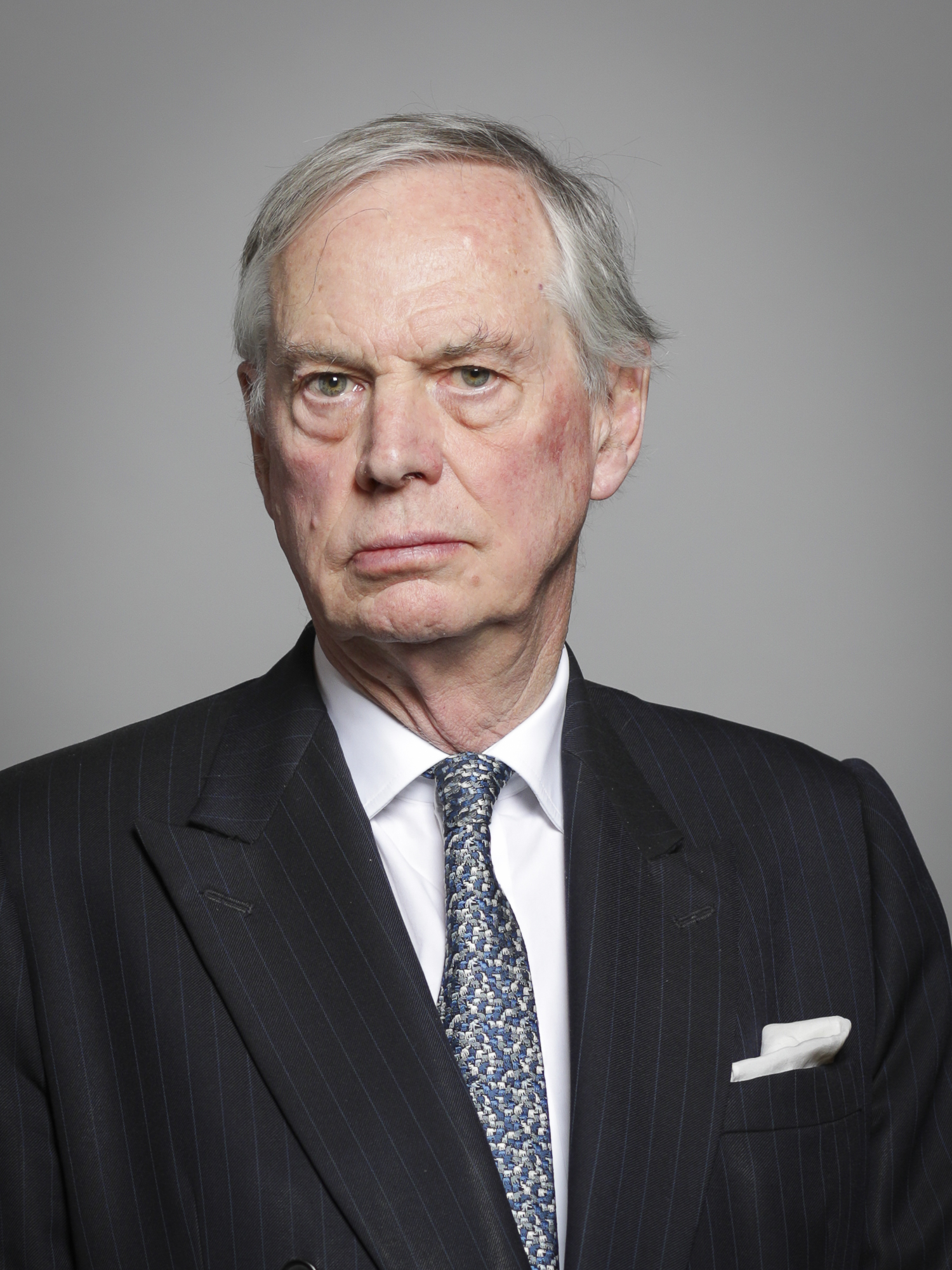
- Lord Astor of Hever in 2019

Parliamentary Under-Secretary of State For Defence
- In office 11 May 2010 – 8 May 2015
- Prime Minister: David Cameron
- Preceded by: The Lord Drayson
- Succeeded by: The Earl Howe

Lord-in-waiting Government Whip
- In office 11 May 2010 – 5 September 2011
- Prime Minister: David Cameron
- Preceded by: The Lord Brett
- Succeeded by: The Baroness Stowell of Beeston

Member of the House of Lords
- Lord Temporal
- Hereditary peerage 11 February 1986 – 11 November 1999
- Preceded by: The 2nd Baron Astor of Hever
- Succeeded by: Seat abolished
- Elected Hereditary Peer; 11 November 1999 – 22 July 2022
- Election: 1999
- Preceded by: Seat established
- Succeeded by: The 8th Earl of Effingham

Personal details
- Born: John Jacob Astor VIII; 16 June 1946 (age 80)
- Party: Conservative
- Spouses: Fiona Lennox-Harvey (m. 1970; div. 1990); Elizabeth Mackintosh (m. 1990)
- Children: 5
- Parent(s): Gavin Astor, 2nd Baron Astor of Hever; Lady Irene Haig
- Relatives: Astor family
- Education: Eton College
- Occupation: Businessman, politician

John Jacob Astor VIII, 3rd Baron Astor of Hever (born 16 June 1946), is an English businessman and politician from the Astor family. He sat in the House of Lords as a Conservative hereditary peer from 1984 to his retirement in 2022. Astor was Parliamentary Under-Secretary of State at the Ministry of Defence from 2010 to 2015. Astor is a Deputy Lieutenant of Kent.

== Family background ==
John Jacob Astor VIII was born 16 June 1946. He is the eldest of the five children of Gavin Astor, 2nd Baron Astor of Hever from the Astor family and Lady Irene Haig. Astor succeeded to the peerage after his father died from cancer in June 1984. His younger siblings are Bridget, Elizabeth, Sarah, and Philip. His maternal grandfather was Field Marshal Douglas Haig, 1st Earl Haig.

== Education and military career ==
Astor was educated at Eton College before serving with the Life Guards (the senior regiment of the British Army, part of the Household Cavalry) from 1966 until 1970, where he visited Malaysia, Hong Kong, and Northern Ireland as well as ceremonial duties in London.

He worked in France for 11 years, and is now patron of the Conservatives in Paris.

== Political career ==
In 1994, Lord Astor was a British Parliamentary Observer in Johannesburg during the South African General Election. He was a member of the Executive, Association of Conservative Peers from 1996 to 1998. In 1999 he was elected to continue as a member of the House of Lords. Astor retired from the House of Lords on 22 July 2022.

From 1998 to 2001, he served as an Opposition Spokesman on Social Security and Health from 1998 to 2003. From 2001, he has been an Opposition Spokesman for Foreign & Commonwealth Affairs, and International Development, from 2003 to 2010, Opposition Spokesman for Defense, and from 2010 to 2011 a Lord in Waiting. From 2010 to 2015 he was parliamentary under-secretary of state at the Ministry of Defence. He is currently the Prime Minister's Trade Envoy to Oman and Defence Secretary's Adviser for Military Co-operation with the Sultanate of Oman.

He is former Hon. Vice-Chairman of the Conservative Middle East Council. In 1995 he piloted through the House of Lords the Road Traffic (New Drivers) Act and in 1996 the Trading Schemes Act.

== Marriages and children ==
Astor married firstly Fiona Diana Lennox-Harvey, a daughter of Captain Roger Harvey, on 1 July 1970. They had three daughters. They were divorced in 1990 and in the same year Astor married Elizabeth Constance Mackintosh, younger daughter of John Mackintosh, 2nd Viscount Mackintosh of Halifax. They have two children.

== Arms ==
Coat of arms of John Astor, 3rd Baron Astor of Hever

Coronet
A Coronet of a Baron
Crest
Rising from a Mount Vert a Falcon proper ensigned by three Mullets Or
Escutcheon
Argent eight Barrulets Sable over all resting on a Dexter Hand couped at the wrist proper gauntleted Gules a Falcon also Gules in chief two Fleurs de lys of the last
Supporters
Dexter: the figure of Aesculapius proper; Sinister: the figure of Mercury also proper
Motto
Ad Astra (To the stars)

== Notes ==
Peerage of the United Kingdom
Preceded by Gavin Astor	Baron Astor of Hever; 1984–present Member of the House of Lords (1986–1999)	Incumbent; Heir apparent: Hon. Charles Astor
Parliament of the United Kingdom
New office created by the House of Lords Act 1999	Elected hereditary peer to the House of Lords under the House of Lords Act 1999; 1999–2022	Succeeded by The Earl of Effingham
