= Hever Castle =

Historic building in Kent, England

- Hever, Edenbridge, Kent
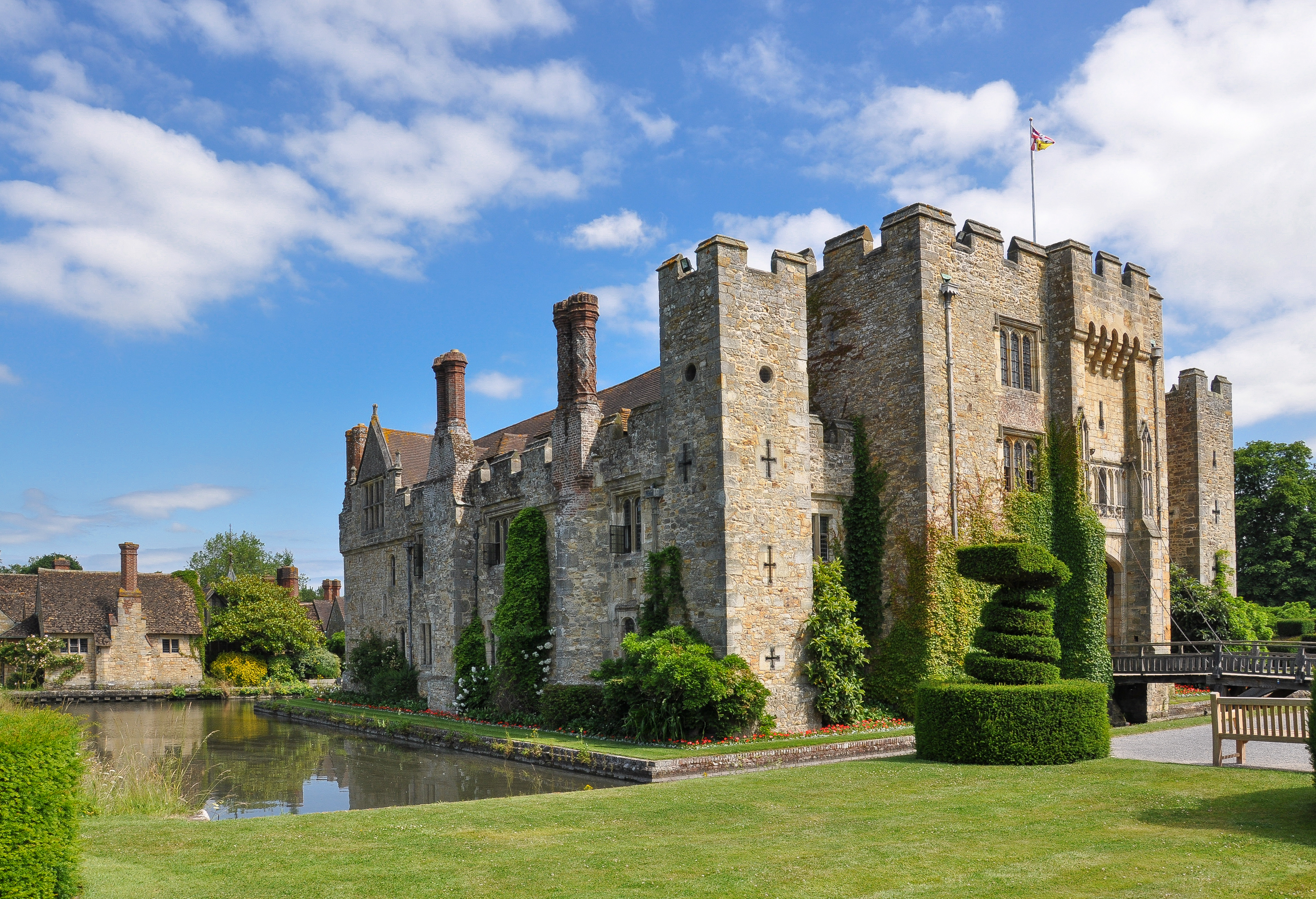
- Hever Castle in 2014

Site information
- Type: Castle
- Owner: Broadland Properties Limited
- Open to the public: Yes
- Condition: Intact

Location
- Shown within Kent
- Location within Kent
- Coordinates: 51°11′14″N 0°6′51″E
- Grid reference: grid reference TQ478452

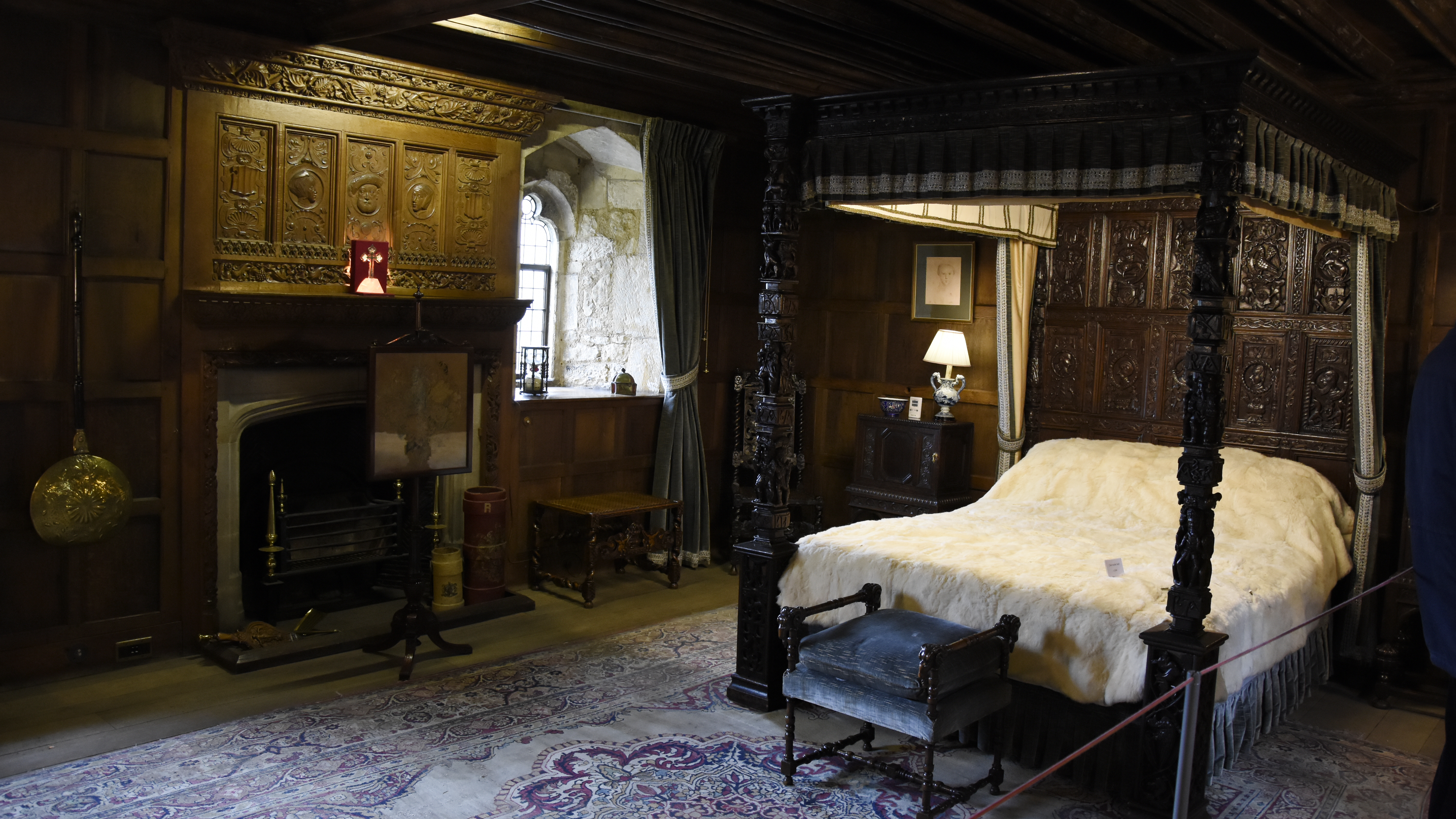
The bedroom of Henry VIII at Hever Castle

Hever Castle (/ˈhiːvə/ HEE-və) is located in the village Hever, Kent, near Edenbridge, 30 miles (48 km) southeast of London, England. It began as a country house, built in the 13th century. From 1462 to 1539, it was the seat of the Boleyn (originally 'Bullen') family.

Anne Boleyn, the second queen consort of King Henry VIII of England, spent her early youth there after her father, Thomas Boleyn, inherited it in 1505. The castle passed to him upon the death of his father, Sir William Boleyn. It later came into the possession of King Henry VIII's fourth wife, Anne of Cleves.

The Grade I listed castle is now owned by the Guthrie family's Broadland Properties.

== History ==
There have been three main periods in the construction of this historic castle. The castle's oldest part dates to 1270 and consisted of the gatehouse and a walled bailey. It was then owned by James Fiennes, 1st Baron Saye and Sele. The second period was when the castle, then in need of repair, was converted into a manor in 1462 by Geoffrey Boleyn, younger brother of Thomas Boleyn, Master of Gonville Hall, Cambridge. He added a Tudor dwelling within the walls. The third period of repair and renovation was in the 20th century, when it was acquired by William Waldorf Astor.

Geoffrey Boleyn's grandson, Thomas Boleyn, inherited the castle in 1505. He lived there with his wife Lady Elizabeth Howard and their children George, Mary and Anne (the future wife of Henry VIII). Anne was born at Blickling Hall (the year of her birth is not certain), but she lived at Hever until she was sent to the Habsburg Netherlands in 1513 to receive an education at the court of the Archduchess Margaret. Henry VIII often used the nearby Bolebroke Castle to conduct his courtship with Anne.

The property came into the possession of Henry VIII after the death of Anne's father, Thomas Boleyn, in 1539. He bestowed it upon Anne of Cleves in 1540 as part of the settlement following the annulment of their marriage. Hever Castle still has one of Henry VIII's private locks, taken with him on his various visits to noblemen's houses and fitted to every door for his security.

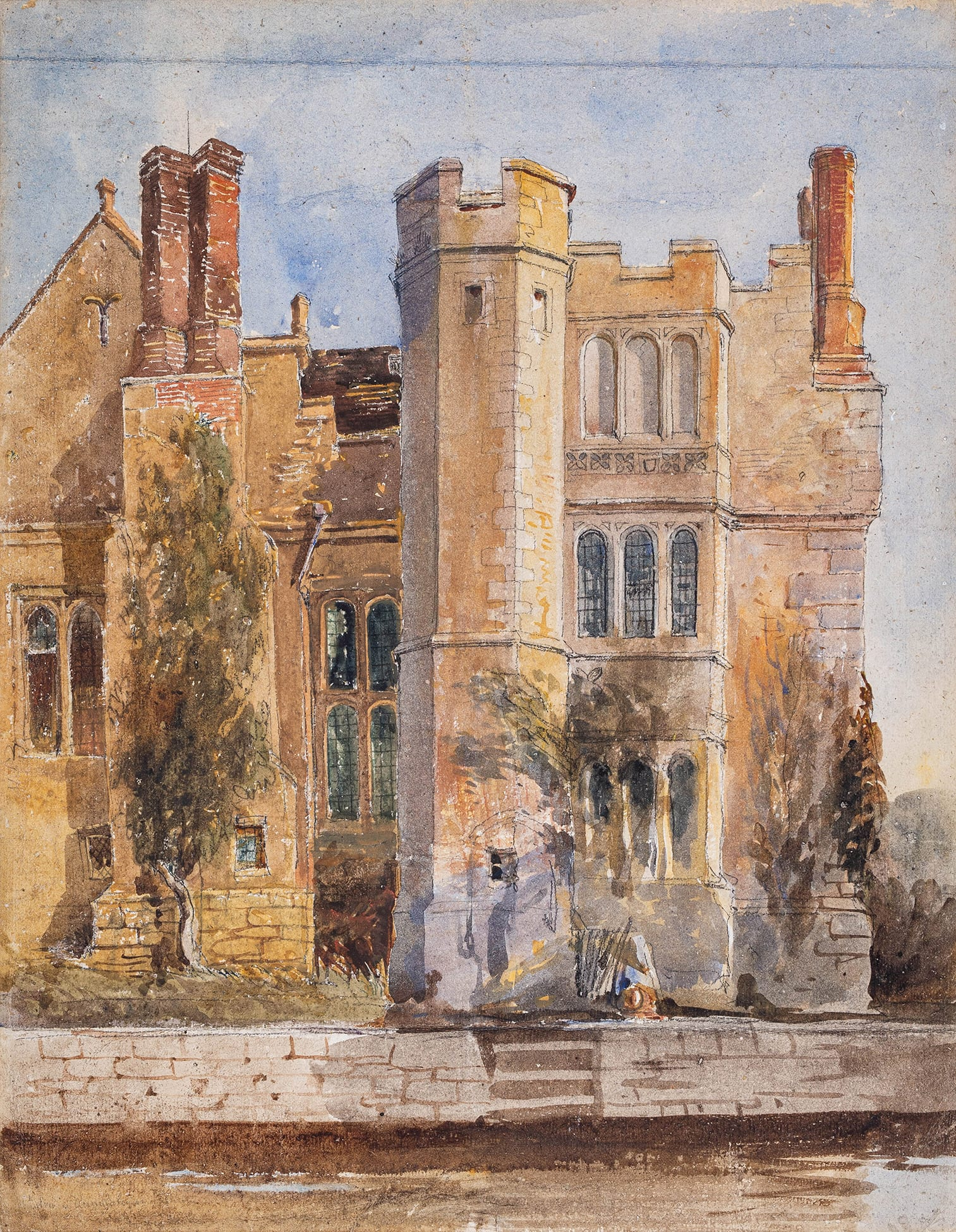
Hever Castle from the Moat, circa 1850, by David Cox Jr.

The property subsequently passed through various owners, including the Waldegrave family from 1557 to 1715, the Humfreys family to 1749 and the Meade-Waldo family from 1749 to 1903. During this latter period of ownership, the castle fell into a poor state of repair, during which time it was leased to various private tenants.

In 1903, it was acquired and restored by the American millionaire William Waldorf Astor, who used it as a family residence. He completed a restoration, added the Tudor village (also known as the Astor Wing) and also added the Italian Garden to display his collection of statuary and ornaments.

The castle has been Grade I listed since 10 September 1954; that was after the addition of the Tudor village, "a picturesque cluster of guest cottages".

In 1983, the Astor family sold the castle to John Guthrie (1906-1992), chairman of the family-run business, Broadland Properties Limited.

== Attractions for tourists ==
Hever Castle is now a tourist attraction, drawing on its links to Anne Boleyn and Henry VIII, its mazes, gardens and lakes. There is an annual event programme with assorted events, including jousting tournaments and archery displays in the summer months and an annual patchwork and quilting exhibition in September. The castle has also become the venue for a triathlon and open water swimming. The castle has three floors containing antique furniture, Anne Boleyn's prayer books, instruments of torture, and a large collection of Tudor paintings. In a separate building, there is also a museum of the Kent and Sharpshooters Yeomanry.

The remains of the original country house timbers can still be seen within the stone walls of the fortification, while the gatehouse is the only original part of the castle. It has the oldest working original portcullis in England. The grounds of the castle include a hedge maze of yew trees planted in 1904. There is also a water maze, opened in 1999, the object of which is to reach the folly at the centre without getting wet. In the children's adventure playground, there is a tower maze (currently undergoing reconstruction). The castle gardens contain a wide range of features, including an Italianate garden (including Fernery), rose gardens, herb garden, and topiary.

The castle has 28 rooms in the adjacent Tudor village that can be rented in a B&B format. The castle has two restaurants, located in the gardens.

== In popular culture ==
The castle has been used as a location for music videos.

The 2020 drama-thriller television series The Third Day used the castle as a filming location. The Loggia on the lake was used as the location for a peace conference in the comedy-drama tevelvision series The Great. Scenes from the second season of the Star Wars series Andor were filmed at the castle, doubling for Naboo. It was previously used for Star Wars: Episode I – The Phantom Menace.

Movie productions that have filmed on the property include The Passionate Pilgrim, The Princess Bride and Inkheart.

== Gallery ==
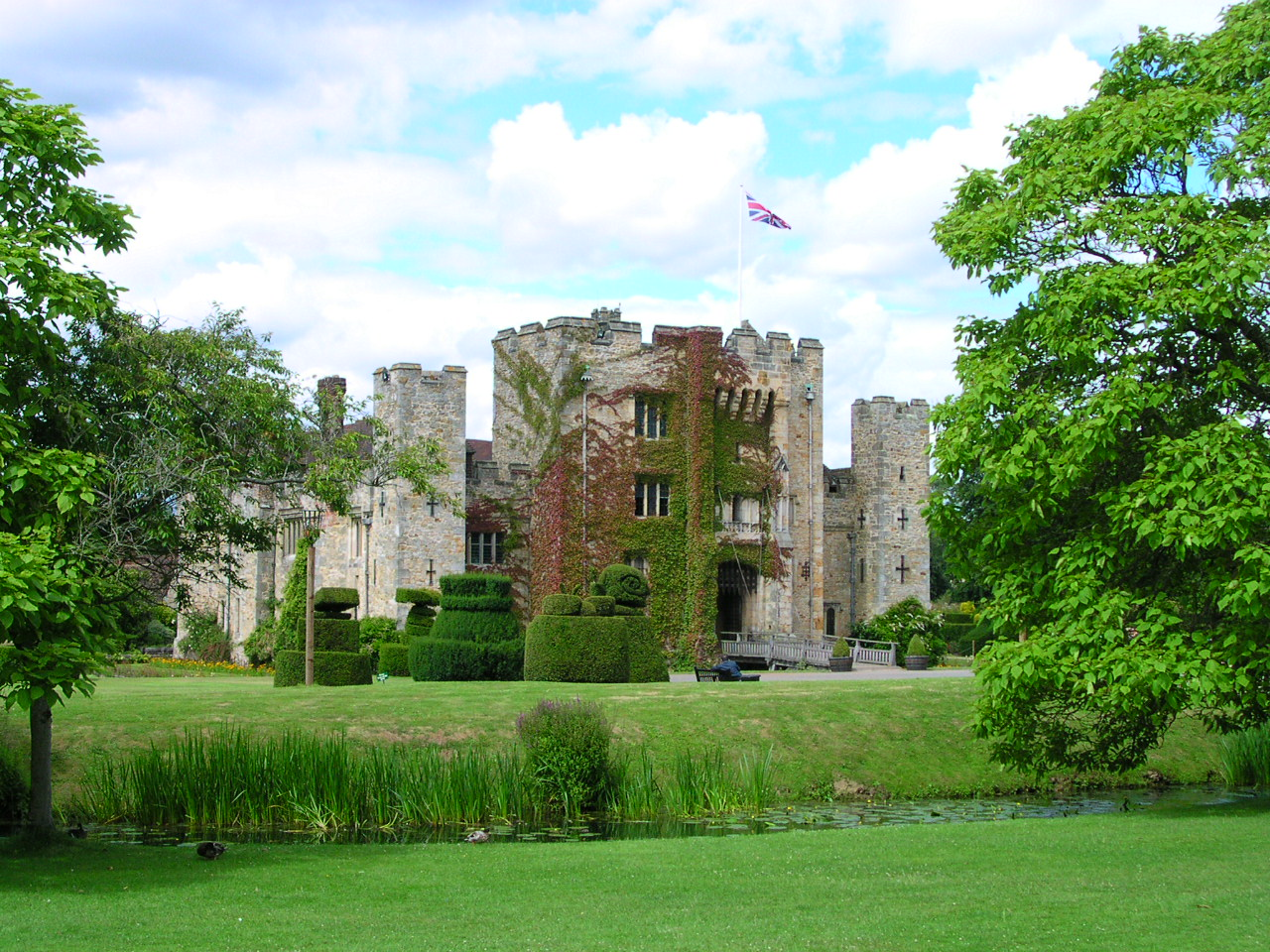
Hever Castle

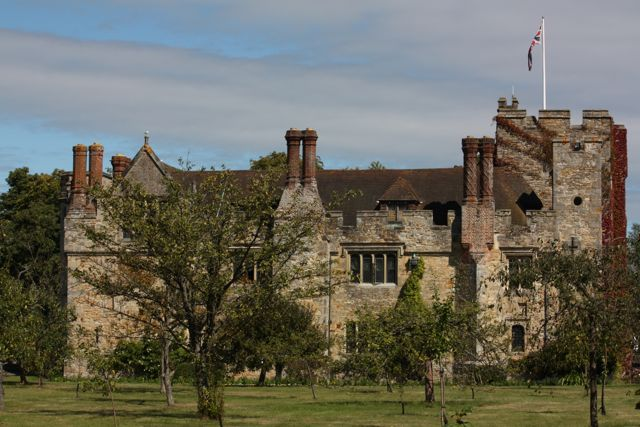
Hever Castle - side view

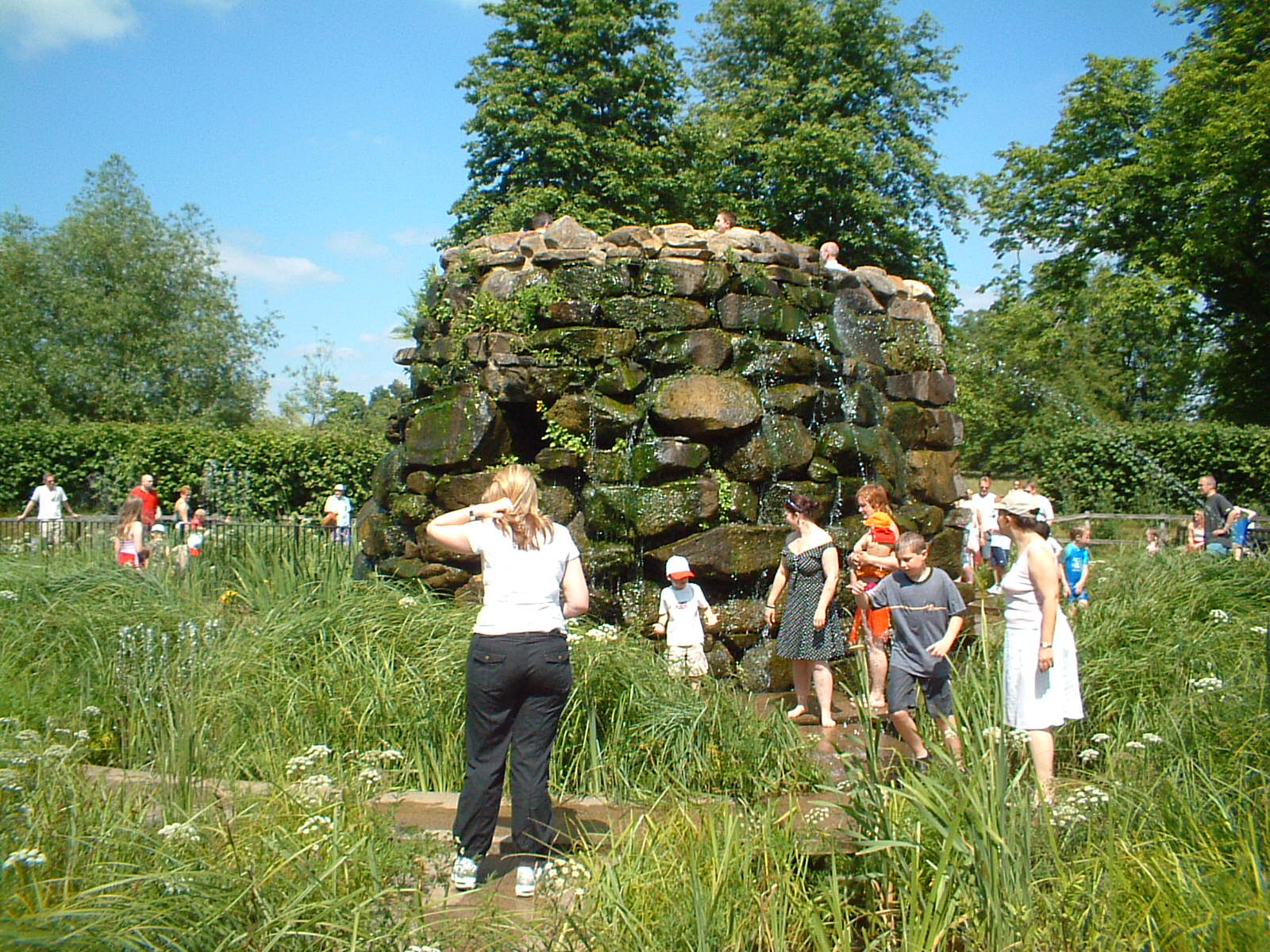
The water maze

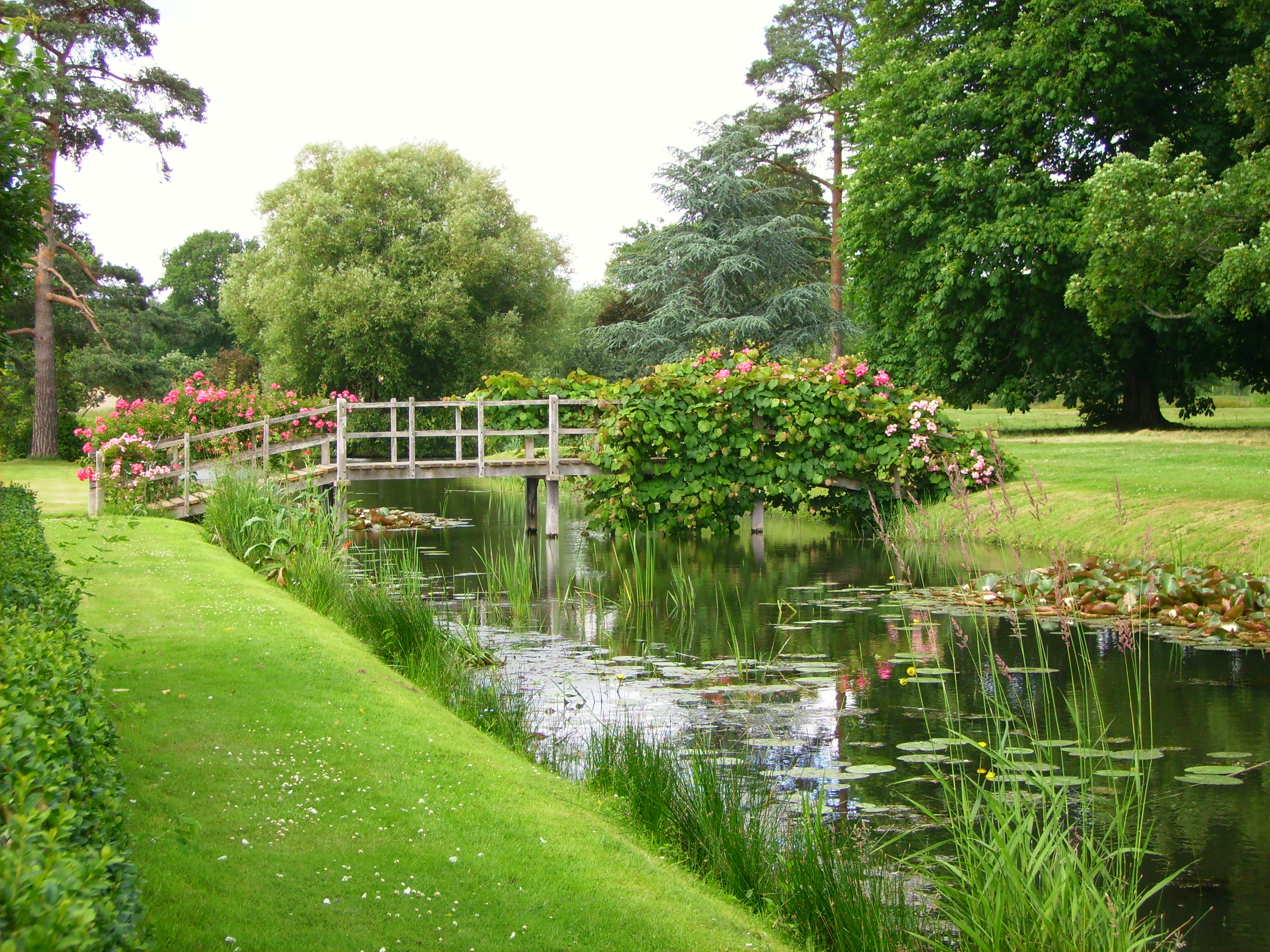
A bridge over the moat

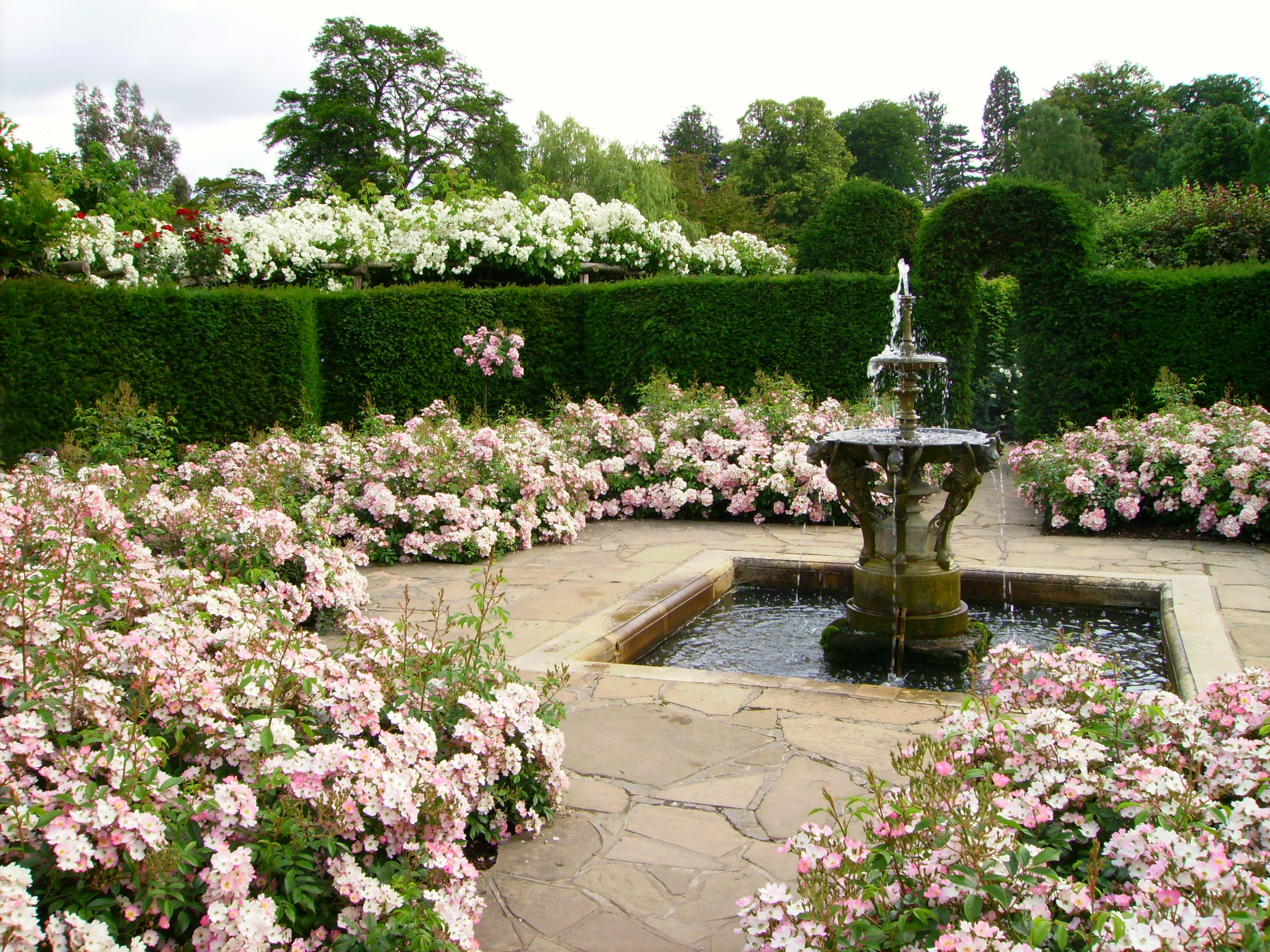
One of the rose gardens

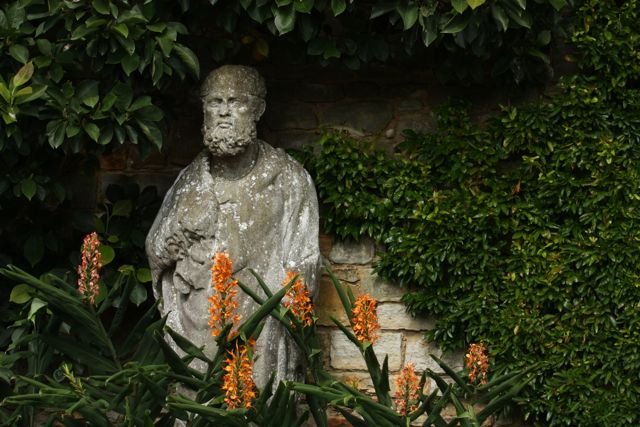
Statue in the castle grounds

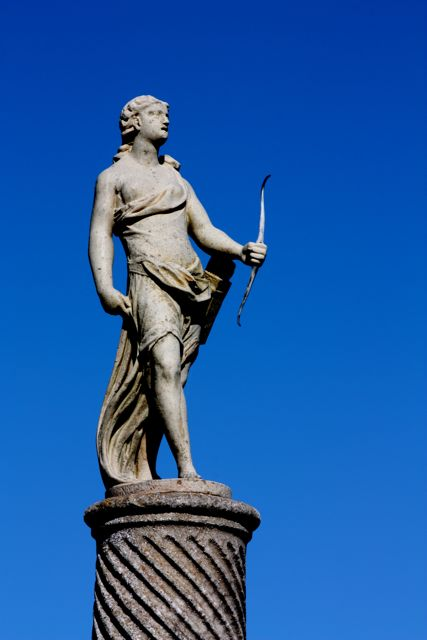
Another statue in the castle grounds

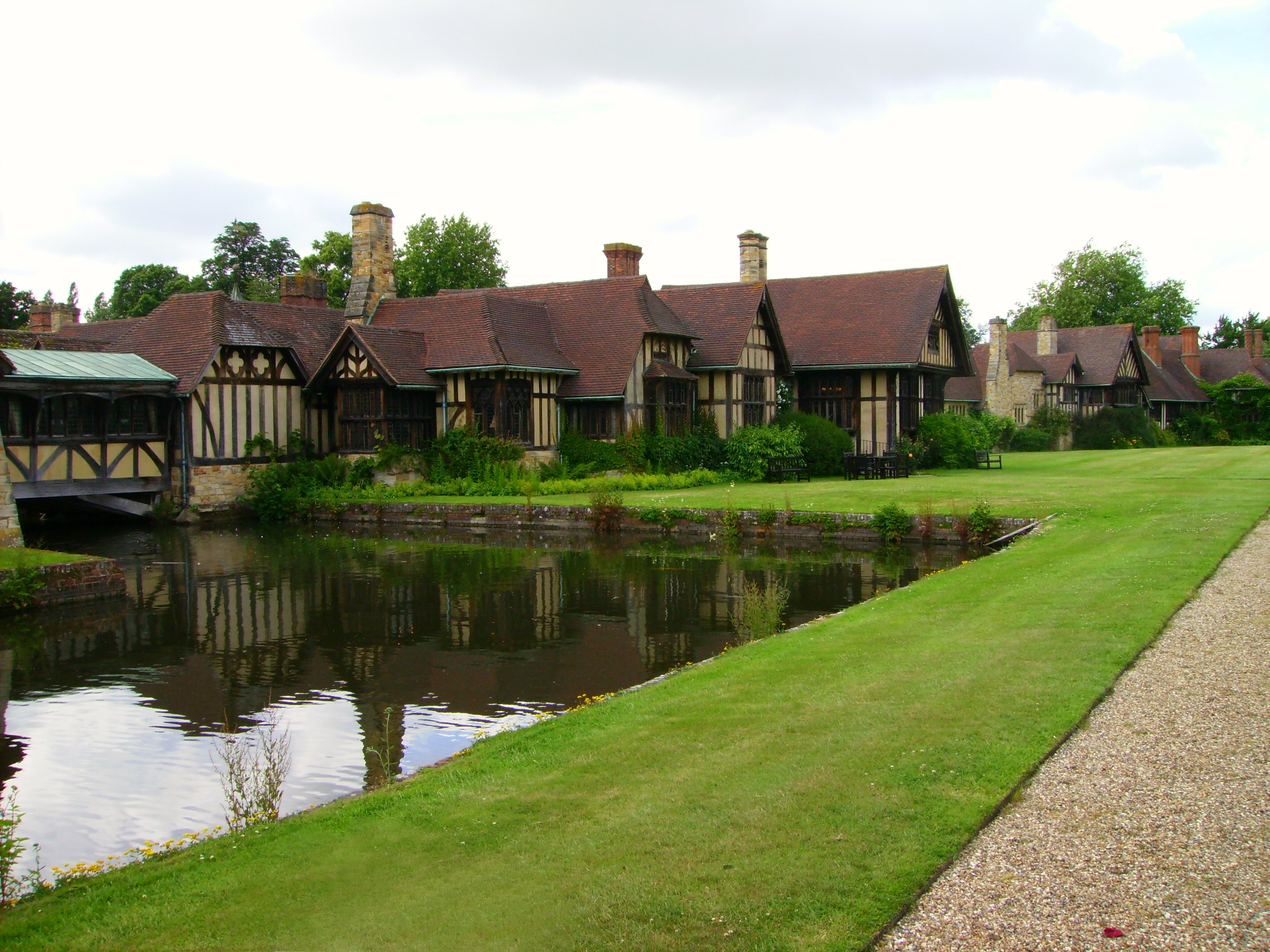
Cottages near the castle

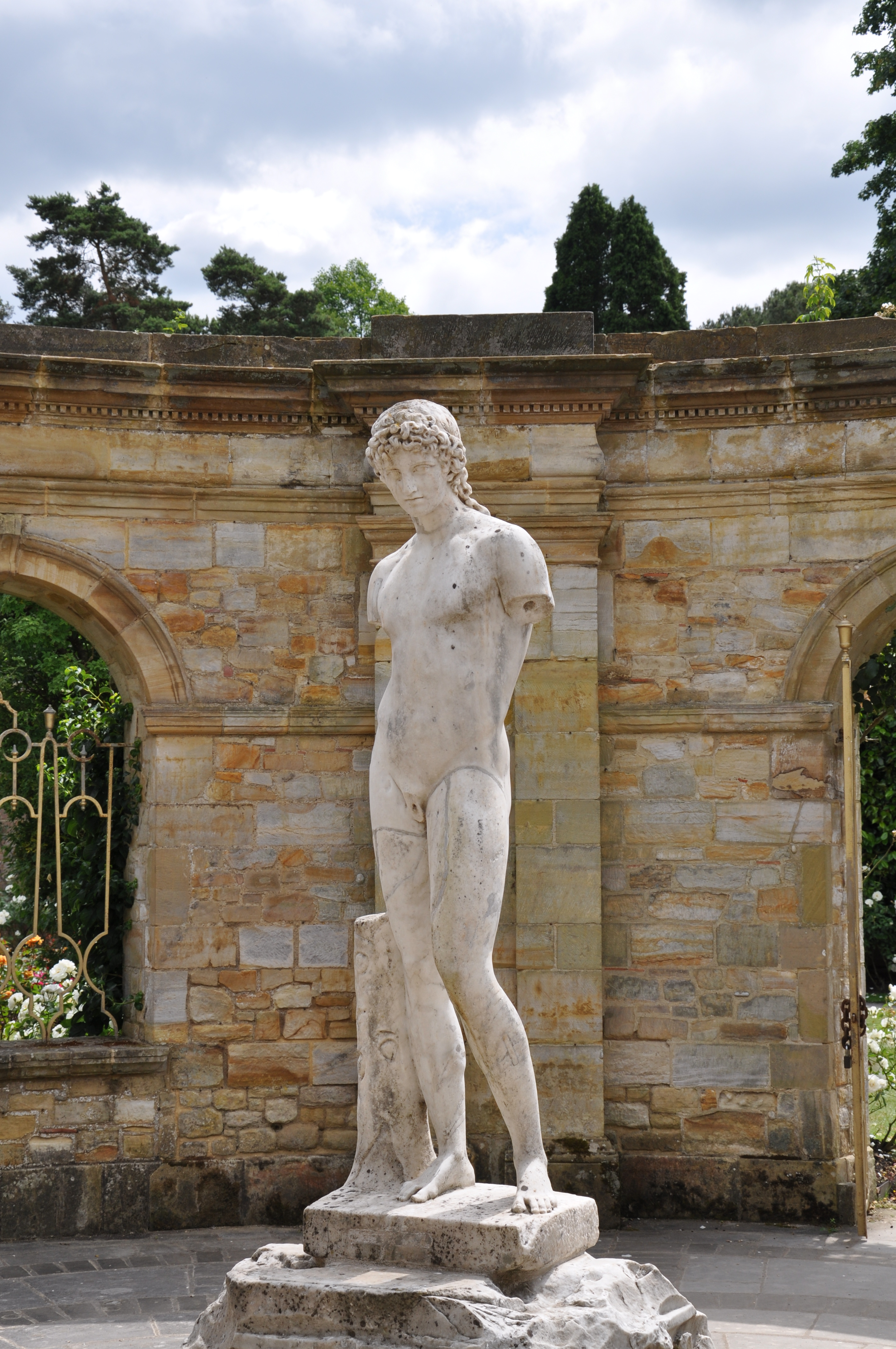
Italian Gardens

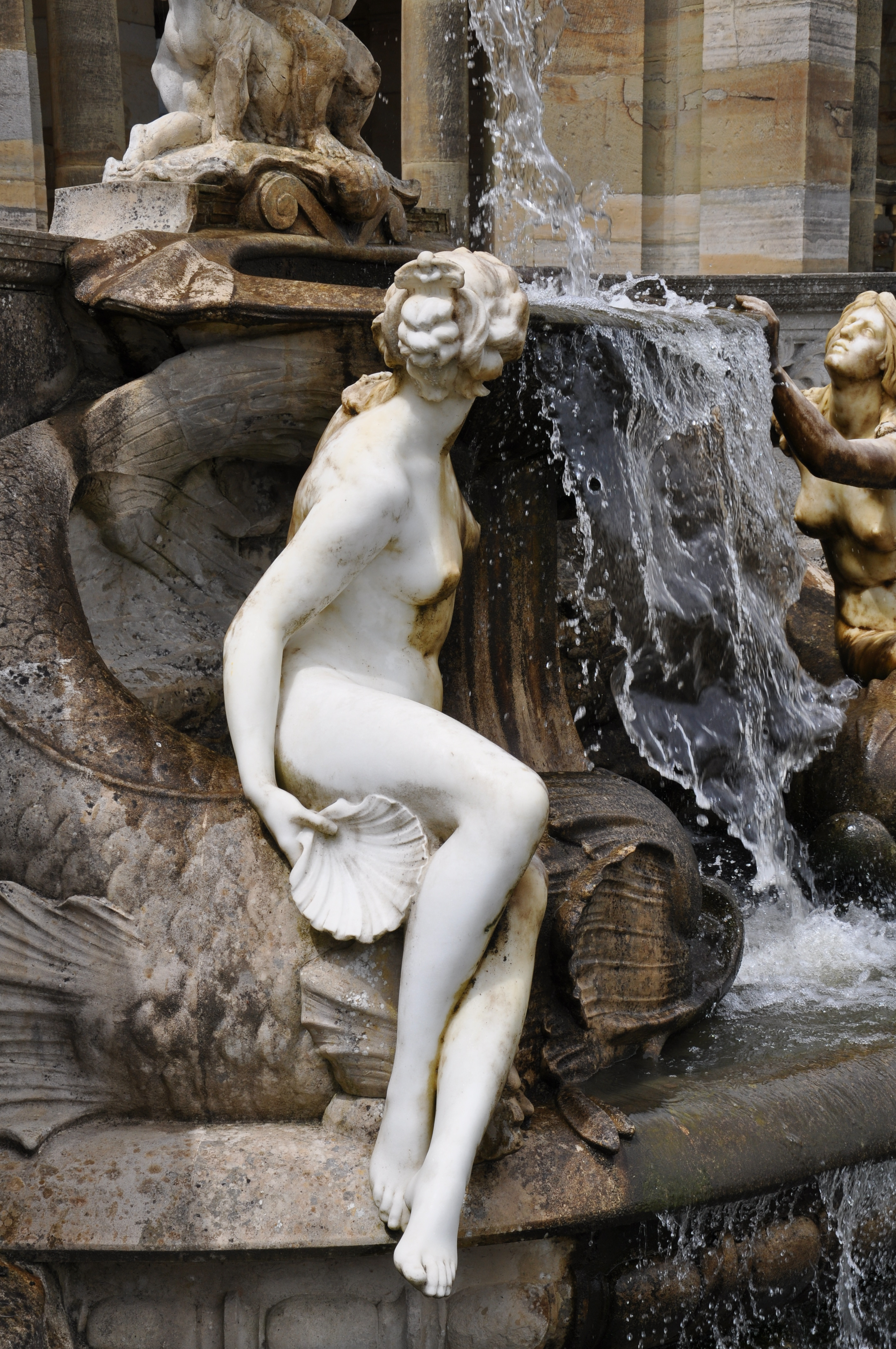
Loggia with fountain

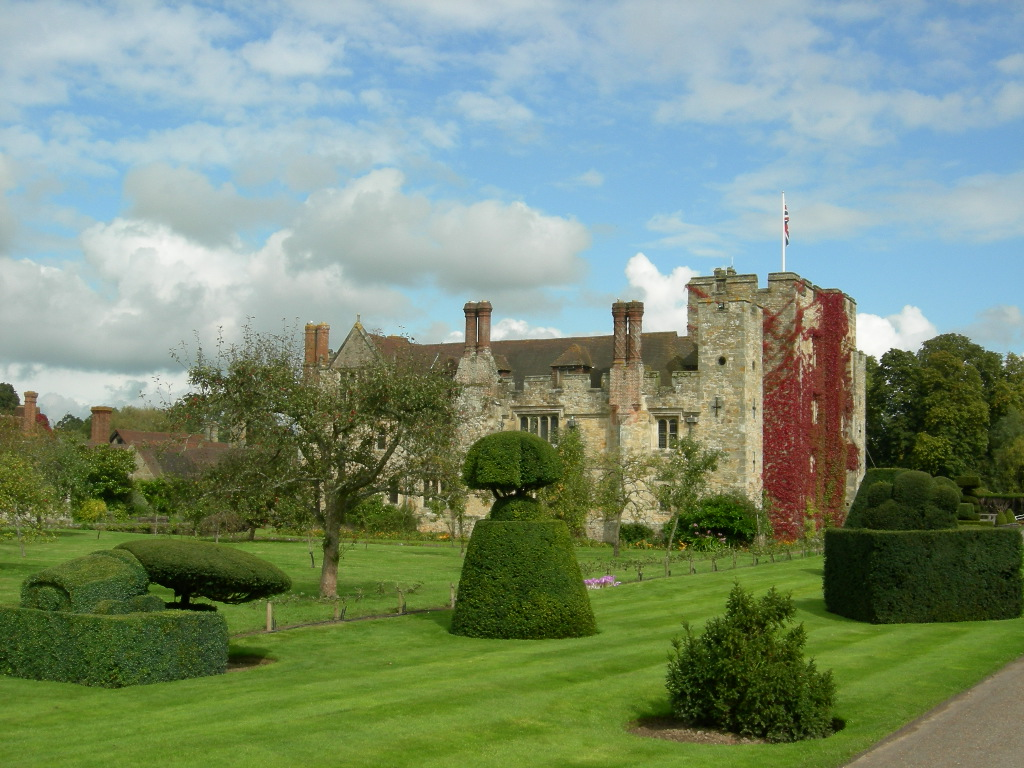
The castle in 2008

== See also ==
- Castles in Great Britain and Ireland
- List of castles in England#Kent
