= The Apthorp =

Condominium in Manhattan, New York

- U.S. National Register of Historic Places
- New York State Register of Historic Places
- New York City Landmark
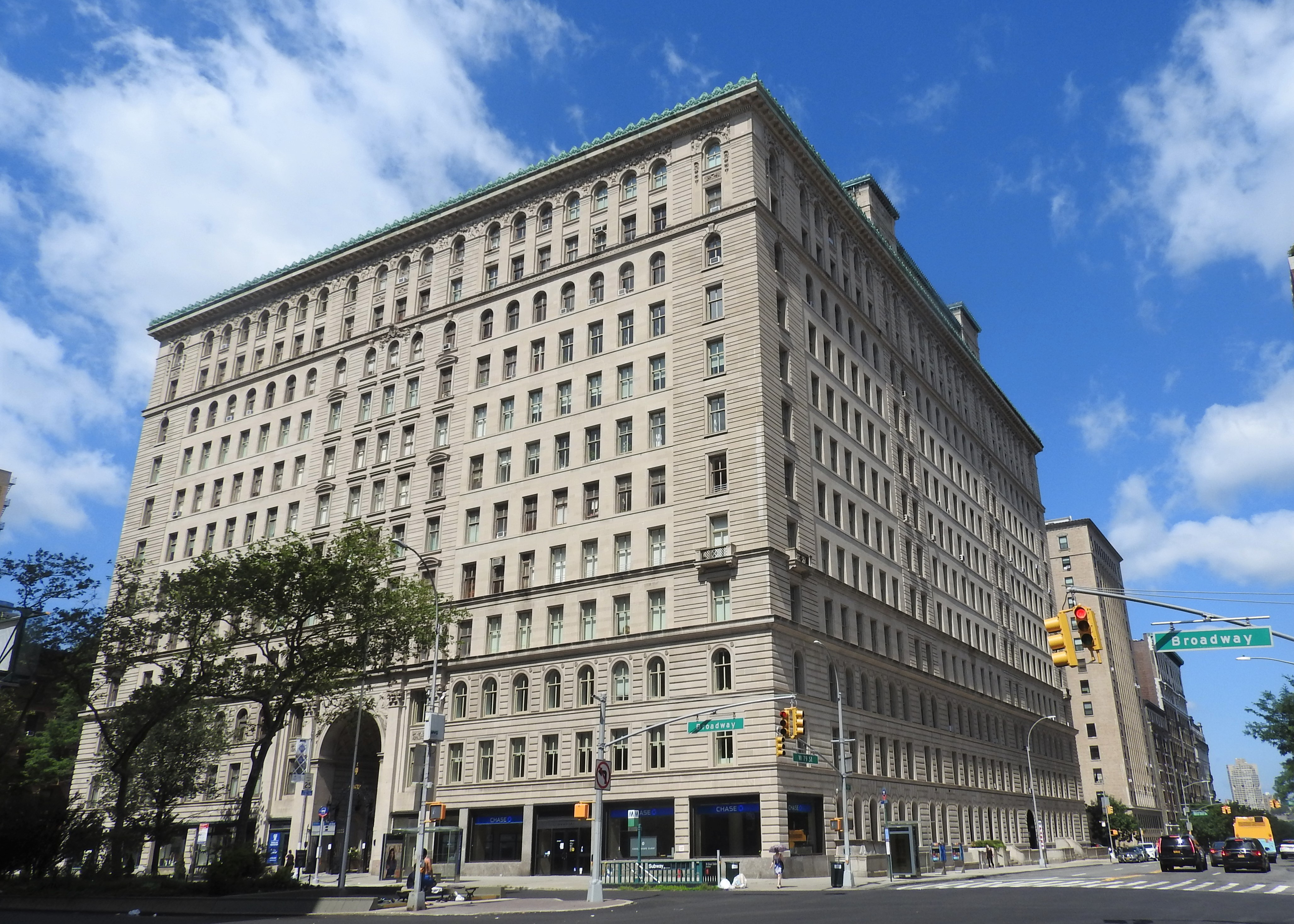
- Seen from Broadway and 79th Street
- Location: 2211 Broadway; Manhattan, New York, U.S.
- Coordinates: 40°47′02″N 73°58′52″W
- Built: 1906–1908
- Architect: Clinton & Russell
- Architectural style: Italian Renaissance
- NRHP reference No.: 78001868
- NYSRHP No.: 06101.001670
- NYCL No.: 0288

Significant dates
- Added to NRHP: January 30, 1978
- Designated NYSRHP: June 23, 1980
- Designated NYCL: September 9, 1969

The Apthorp is a condominium building at 2211 Broadway on the Upper West Side of Manhattan in New York City, United States. The 12-story structure was designed by Clinton & Russell in the Italian Renaissance Revival style and occupies the full block between Broadway, West End Avenue, and West 78th and 79th Streets. It was built between 1905 and 1908 as a residential hotel by William Waldorf Astor, who named it after the Apthorp Farm, of which the site used to be part. The Apthorp is a New York City designated landmark and is listed on the National Register of Historic Places.

The building occupies a nearly rectangular site and has a limestone facade, which is divided horizontally into three sections. On West End Avenue and Broadway, three-story arches at the center of the facade lead to an internal courtyard with a garden, driveway, and entrances to the apartments. The Apthorp is divided into four sections, each with its own lobby, and originally had a mechanical plant in the basement. The building originally had 104 apartments, which were largely arranged as simplexes with first and second floor duplexes and designed in a variety of styles; the apartments had large rooms and high ceilings. By the 1940s, the building had 165 units, although some of these apartments have since been combined.

Astor announced plans for an apartment building on the site in 1901, although the project was delayed for four years due to uncertainty over the plans. Workers began clearing the site in October 1905, and the building was completed in August 1908. The Astor family operated the building for over four decades, adding storefronts in the late 1920s. Many of the units were divided during the 1930s and 1940s. The Astor family ultimately sold the building in 1950, and the building changed ownership several times through the late 20th century. The owner 390 West End Associates sold the building in 2006 to Maurice Mann, who partnered with Africa Israel Investments to convert the building into condos. After numerous delays and disagreements, the condominium-offering plan went into effect in 2010, and a subsidiary of the Feil Organization took over the building's management. Area Property Partners took over as the condo project's sponsor in 2012.

== Site ==
The Apthorp is located at 2201–2219 Broadway on the Upper West Side of Manhattan in New York City. It occupies the entirety of a rectangular city block bounded by Broadway to the east, 79th Street to the north, West End Avenue to the west, and 78th Street to the south. The land lot covers 50,524 ft^{2} (4,693.8 m^{2}) and has frontage of approximately 204 ft (62 m) on Broadway and West End Avenue and 248 ft (76 m) on 78th and 79th Streets. The Belleclaire Hotel, Collegiate School, and West End Collegiate Church are to the south, while the First Baptist Church in the City of New York is directly to the north. An entrance to the New York City Subway's 79th Street station, serving the 1 train, is directly outside the northeastern corner of the building.

Before European colonization of modern-day New York City, the site was part of the hunting grounds of the Wecquaesgeek Native American tribe. After the British established the Province of New York, the area became part of the "Thousand Acre Tract", owned by several English and Dutch settlers, in 1667. Stephen De Lancey acquired the land from modern-day 78th to 89th Streets before 1729 and used it as his countryside estate. He died in 1741 and left the estate to his son Oliver De Lancey. Charles Ward Apthorp acquired the southern portion of De Lancey's estate in 1763 and developed the Apthorp Farm there. By the 19th century, Apthorp's daughter Charlotte married John C. Vanden Heuvel, (Note: Sometimes spelled Van den Heuval) and the couple occupied the site. The farm contained a two-story house with stone walls and a gable roof, which dated from 1759 and was used as a lodge, Burnham's Hotel, in the 19th century. The Vanden Heuvels only used the estate until the 1850s, and the house had deteriorated into a venue for "prizefights, cockfights, and all kinds of illegal practices" by the 1880s. The house was demolished in 1905 when the Apthorp was built, at which point it was severely deteriorated.

== Architecture ==
The Apthorp was designed in the Italian Renaissance Revival style by the architectural firm of Clinton and Russell. It is twelve stories high. The building's design is partially based on that of the Palazzo Pitti in Florence. John Downey was the general contractor for the structure. In addition, Frank Williams was the interior designer, Batterson & Eisele provided the marble, the W. H. Jackson Company installed the tiling and fireplaces, and the Atlantic Terra Cotta Company made the architectural terracotta.

=== Form and facade ===
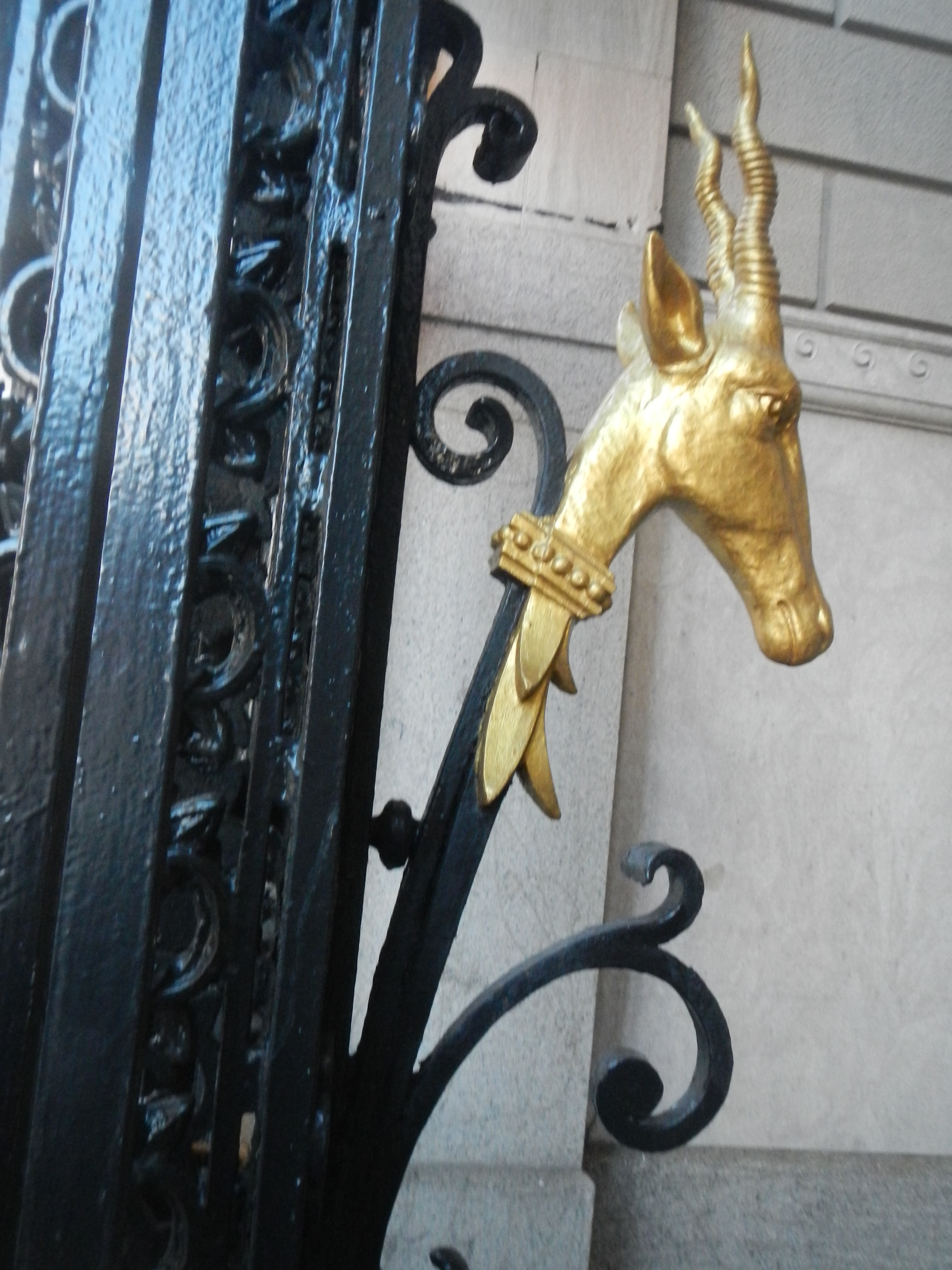
Gilded antelope head

The facade was designed as a variation of a three-story Renaissance palazzo. As such, the facade is divided horizontally into three sections: a three-story base, a seven-story shaft, and a two-story upper portion. The corners of the building, as well as the central sections of each elevation, contain vertically arranged quoins. The outermost bays are wider than the others on the facade and are flanked by the quoins. These outer bays, as well as horizontal string moldings, both articulate the otherwise rectangular mass. The facade contained 2,000 windows when the building was completed. Most of the windows on the facade are rectangular, but there are arched windows on the third, tenth, and twelfth stories. The facade retains many of its original design elements, but objects such as grilles, air-conditioner openings, and lights have been installed over the years.

On the western and eastern elevations of the facade (respectively facing West End Avenue and Broadway), there is a three-story, arched porte-cochère at the center, flanked by rusticated blocks. The entrances contain elaborate wrought-iron gates with scrolled trellises, topped by gilded deer heads and stylized variations of the name "Apthorp". There are Corinthian-style pilasters on either side of each arch, which in turn are topped by oversized sculpted representations of women at the fourth story. In addition, the keystone of each arch contains a hooded head, while the spandrels on either side contain bas-reliefs of women. The entrances are also decorated with garlands. The ground-story facade has largely been converted to storefronts.

The fourth through tenth stories are largely clad with smooth limestone, except at the corners, which contain quoins. The outermost bays contain balconettes at the fifth story. The five center bays of the western and eastern elevations, and two groups of two bays on each of the northern and southern elevations, contain rusticated limestone facade. In the center five bays of the western and eastern elevations, the windows are topped by either flat lintels or arched pediments, and the 10th-story windows also have keystones. The eleventh and twelfth stories are designed similarly to a loggia and contain double-height arches, which are elaborately decorated and are separated by pilasters. Above the twelfth story is a projecting cornice. There are also two rooftop pavilions with wings and loggias. The rooftop pavilions were originally used as roof gardens during the summer and enclosed lounges during the winter. Next to the pavilion was a children's playroom.

==== Courtyard ====
The two arches on West End Avenue and Broadway lead to a courtyard. The courtyard provides entry to all apartments and doubles as a light court for the interiors of each apartment. It is cited as measuring about 134 by 95 ft (41 by 29 m) across. The courtyard is one of a few motor courts at an apartment building in New York City.

The courttard has an oval driveway, an octagonal garden, and two fountains. The facade of the courtyard is decorated similarly to the exterior facade. Furnishings such as marble benches and statues are placed within the courtyard as well. At each corner are iron-and-glass awnings, which shield the building's entrances. Passageways on the north and south sides of the courtyard descend to a staff basement. The awnings, carriage driveway, and fountain were intended to give the courtyard the appearance of a European town square or a royal mansion's courtyard. In addition, the courtyard provided tenants with a private, open-air communal space.

=== Features ===
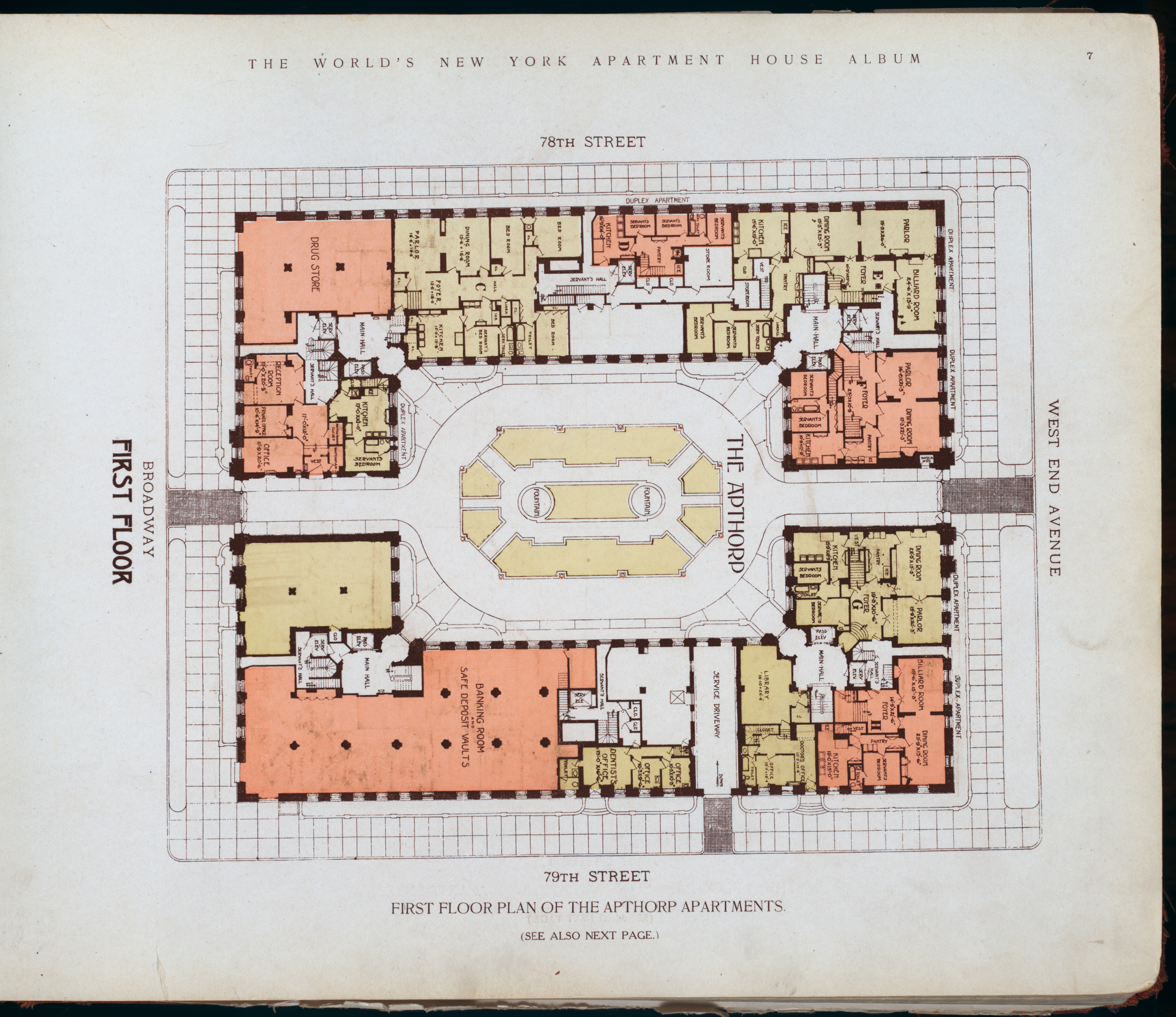
Floor plan of the first story

The building is divided into four sections designated A–D and arranged around the central cobblestoned driveway and courtyard. The basement originally contained a mechanical plant that supplied heat, electricity, and ice to each apartment. The plant contained two sets of refrigerators and eight boilers. Because the plant was placed beneath the courtyard rather than beneath the building itself, this reduced vibrations in the apartments.

Six service elevators lead from the basement to all stories, while four passenger elevators run between the lobby and the top story. The building contains a steel superstructure, including floor beams made of pig iron. The partitions between each apartment are made of terracotta, which was intended to limit the spread of fire. Marble, glass, onyx, and light stone were only used for decorative purposes, and the Apthorp originally did not contain any wood decorations, except for furniture. As a further fireproofing measure, the building also contained kalamein doors and a system of standpipes. In addition, each corner of the building contained a mail chute.

==== Ground story and basement ====
Each of the building's four sections has its own lobby with elevators and staircases; the doors of each lobby had marble frames, and the lobbies' walls were made of Caen stone. As originally designed, the ground level contained physicians' offices, which could be accessed directly from the street, in addition to a drugstore and bank on Broadway at the corners with 78th and 79th Streets. One of the ground-level duplex apartments was a physician's office, where the bedroom was on the upper level. At the time of the Apthorp's completion, large apartment buildings in New York City did not typically have ground-story storefronts, since the public generally considered such buildings to be entirely residential. The ground-level offices were converted to storefronts at some point between 1910 and 1939.

In 2011, a 8,300 ft^{2} (770 m^{2}) amenity area with a gym, playroom, and entertainment center was built in the basement. The space contains cork and oak floors, gilded plaster columns, and marble-covered tables.

==== Apartments ====
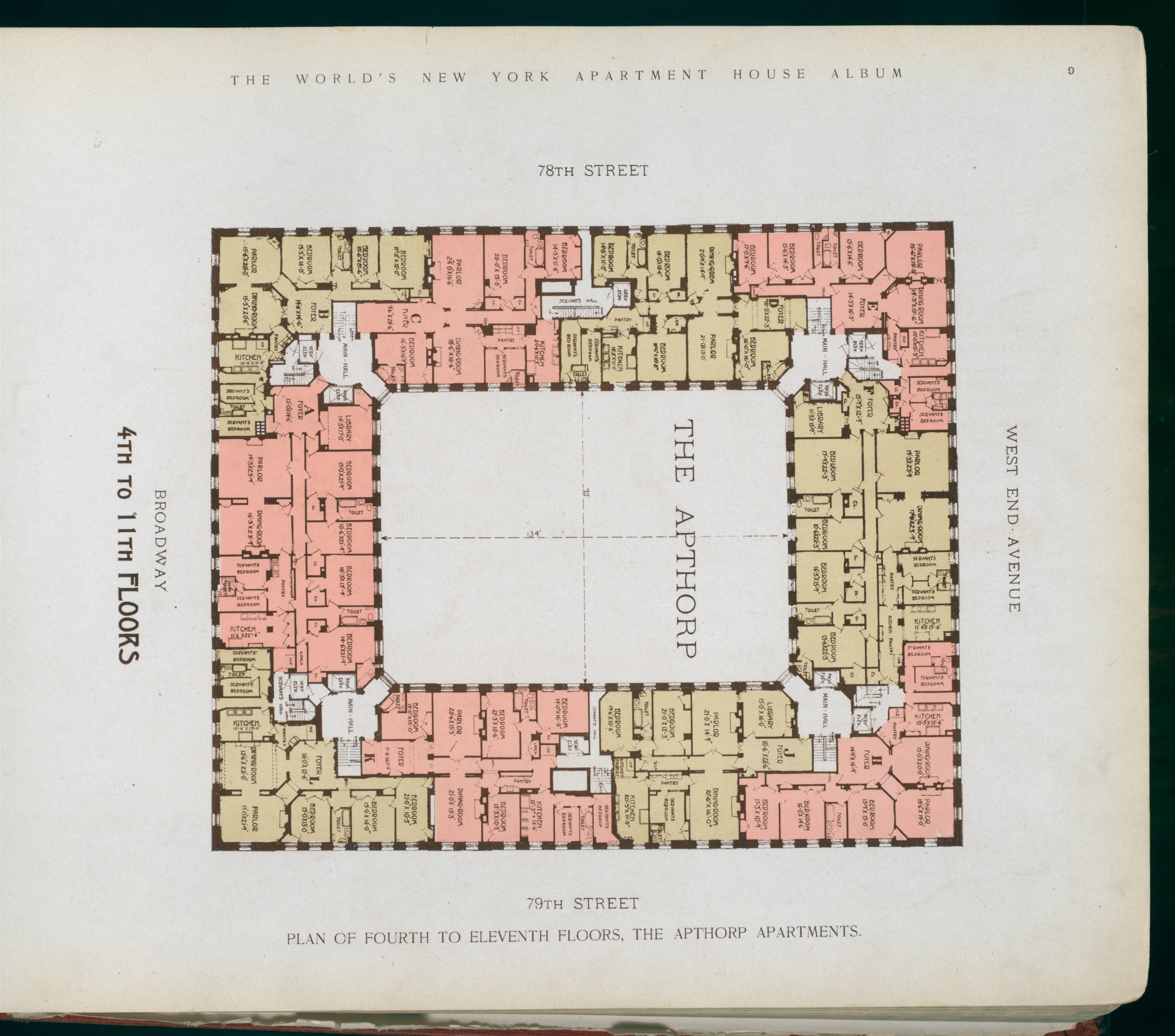
Original floor plan of a typical story

When the Apthorp was completed, it was marketed as the world's largest apartment building. There were originally 104 apartments in total. The first two stories contained seven duplexes, spread across two levels, as well as multiple single-story units. The 12th story contained guestrooms, with their own bathrooms, at three of the building's corners. Also on this story were additional servants' bedrooms and bathrooms; two laundry rooms with 140 or 150 tubs; and ironing and drying rooms. The laundry room had 20 boiling tubs and 20 dryers, and the ironing room had 20 irons. The building was also equipped with hundreds of appliances such as telephones, mail chutes, and ashtrays.

The typical floor contained ten apartments, each with several rooms; most units were arranged as simplexes. The typical apartment included a marble-tiled foyer, at least two bathrooms, and six to twelve additional rooms. Each apartment typically contained the foyer, kitchen, billiards room, dining room, and servants' quarters, as well as a parlor, library, bedrooms, and bathrooms. The rooms were unusually large; for example, some dining rooms measured 16 by 24 ft (4.9 by 7.3 m), and some drawing rooms measured 17 by 28 ft (5.2 by 8.5 m). Apartments also had master bedrooms measuring 17 by 24 ft (5.2 by 7.3 m) with marble fireplaces. The hallways measured 44 in (1,100 mm) wide, much wider than in comparable residences on Park Avenue, and the apartments also had 8 ft (2.4 m) windows and 11 ft (3.4 m) ceilings.

The apartments were designed in a variety of styles, including the Adam, Colonial, Elizabethan, Francis I, Louis XIV, Louis XV, and Louis XVI styles. Some of the units included Baccarat chandeliers, wood paneling, crown moldings, and engraved doors, in addition to marble staircases. The salons had carved fireplace mantels made of marble, and the French doors had glass paneling. Other design features included radiators concealed beneath windowsills, in addition to gas pipes with rectangular "breaks" to prevent gas explosions.

During the 1930s and 1940s, some of the original apartments were divided. Following these modifications, the Apthorp was split into 165 units. The Apthorp was converted to condominiums in 2010, and some of the apartments were combined, bringing the building to approximately 155 units. The condos include details such as ornate millwork and finishes, tall ceilings and windows, and hardwood floors. As of 2020, the largest condo in the Apthorp is a 6,100 ft^{2} (570 m^{2}) unit with five bedrooms and seven bathrooms. The servants' quarters on the top story were also converted to penthouse condominiums. In addition, in 2014, the New York City Landmarks Preservation Commission (LPC) approved plans for a two-story penthouse recessed from the roof.

== History ==
During the early 19th century, apartment developments in the city were generally associated with the working class. By the late 19th century, apartments were also becoming desirable among the middle and upper classes. Between 1880 and 1885, more than ninety apartment buildings were developed in the city. Meanwhile, William Waldorf Astor had built the Waldorf Hotel in 1893 on the future site of the Empire State Building. Following the success of the Waldorf Hotel, Astor decided to develop Graham Court, an apartment building on Seventh Avenue in Harlem, and then the Apthorp on the Upper West Side. Astor had owned the properties for several years without having developed them. He employed Clinton and Russell, who had worked on Graham Court, to design the Apthorp.

=== Astor ownership ===
==== Construction and opening ====
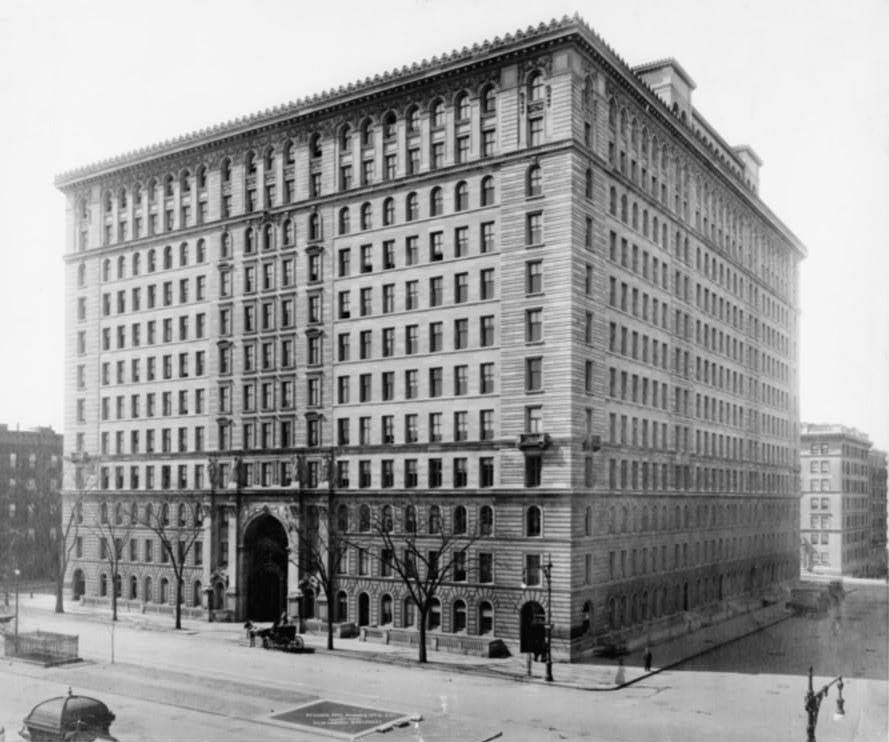
View of the Apthorp from Broadway and 79th Street in 1909

In November 1901, Astor announced that he would spend $2.5 million to erect an apartment building on the city block bounded by Broadway, West End Avenue, and 78th and 79th Streets. At the time, the city's first subway line was being constructed under Broadway, with a station at 79th Street, and Astor planned to build an entrance from his building's basement directly to the subway. Astor did not plan to start construction immediately, as the leases of the site's existing occupants had not expired, and the subway had not opened; the subway ultimately opened in 1904. Clinton and Russell had drawn up plans for the building by mid-1905. At the time, the edifice was planned to be 20 stories tall and was to contain apartments with between four and eighteen rooms. Nonetheless, Astor continued to defer the building's construction. The delay was caused by Astor's dissatisfaction with the labor unions who were building the Hotel Astor on Times Square, as well as the fact that Astor could not decide whether the building on 79th Street should be 14 or 16 stories.

Workers began clearing the site in October 1905. John Downey, who had built both the Waldorf and Astor hotels, was hired as the general contractor the same month. By the end of 1905, workers were excavating the site 24 hours a day, but Astor had not filed plans with the New York City Department of Buildings. Clinton & Russell filed plans for the apartment building in January 1906. At the time, the structure was to be called the "Apthorpe", after the Apthorp Farm. Work took nearly three years because of the Apthorp's advanced mechanical systems and fireproof frame. The Apthorp was completed in August 1908. The structure had cost $2 million to construct, and the land had cost another $1 million. The Apthorp was one of several early-20th-century apartment buildings in Upper Manhattan that were primarily identified by an official name; at the time, many new apartment buildings in the area were known by their addresses. Christopher Gray of The New York Times described the Apthorp as one of several apartment buildings that were famous enough "to maintain their names simply in common custom".

==== 1910s to 1940s ====
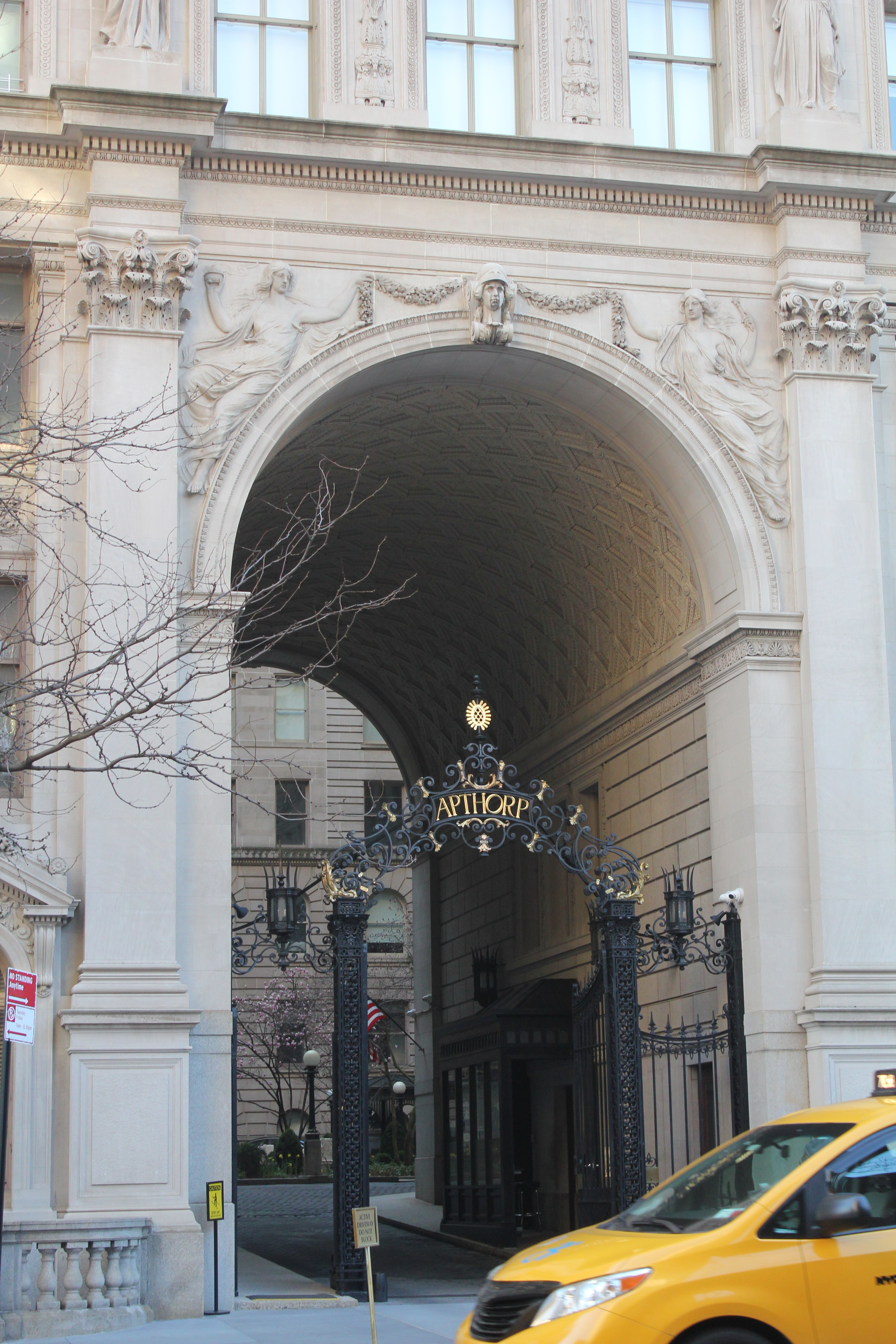
Entrance on West End Avenue

The Apthorp was nearly fully occupied at the time of its opening, despite charging rents of up to $6,500 per year. When the Apthorp opened, it catered mostly to people who had lived nearby on West End Avenue or Riverside Drive. In contrast to older apartment buildings, where most residents had moved from private houses, about one-third of its residents had relocated from other apartment buildings like the Graham Court and the Ansonia. After the similarly-named Apthorp Hotel opened on Broadway between 89th and 90th Streets in 1914, both the hotel and the apartment building frequently received mail and telephone calls intended for the other structure. Astor requested an injunction to prevent that hotel from using the Apthorp name, but a state judge ruled that Astor did not have the rights to the "Apthorp" name. The New York Herald Tribune reported in 1925 that the Astors were considering selling the Apthorp to a syndicate, though this did not happen.

The Astor family hired Clinton & Russell in 1928 to convert the ground story into bronze and marble storefronts. By the next year, the Apthorp was recorded as having nine stores. The City Bank-Farmers Trust Company, acting as trustee for the Astor estate, appointed the firm of Wood and Dolson as the building's renting agent in 1930. With the Great Depression, wealthy residents were no longer willing to pay such high rent. As a result, several of the original apartments were divided into smaller units. creating units with three to five rooms. In addition, the servants' bedrooms were converted into apartments. In total, the number of apartments increased by 57. Tenants rented many of the smaller apartments shortly after they had been renovated. The building's facade was steam-cleaned in mid-1933, around the same time that the apartments were being divided. By the 1940s, the building's residents were largely involved in businesses such as medicine, finance, banking, and real-estate brokerage.

=== Mid- and late 20th century ===
In June 1950, the Astor estate entered a contract to sell the Apthorp to Alexander Gross, president of Apthorp Estates Inc., at a price close to the building's assessed value of $2.45 million. The sale was finalized that July, marking the first change of ownership in the building's history. The City Bank-Farmers Trust Company sold the building's $1.5 million mortgage to an unidentified university's endowment fund shortly afterward. Gross sold the building in 1953 to the Fox-Long Realty Corp. for $3 million; the buyer paid $800,000 in cash and assumed the building's $2.2 million mortgage. Fox-Long immediately resold the building to Apthorp Realty Associates, a firm based in the Bronx. Apthorp Realty Associates sold the building once again in mid-1957 to a syndicate of investors. At the time, the Apthorp was cited as containing 158 apartments, 13 stores, and a 140-space parking garage in the basement.

The building's original storefronts had been replaced with plastic signage by the 1960s. The LPC designated the building as an official city landmark in 1969. A lawyer named Milton Kestenberg owned the Apthorp by then, and its tenants were advocating converting the building into a housing cooperative. At the time, many buildings on the Upper West Side had been converted to co-ops or were in the process of doing so. The proposed conversion of the Apthorp was unusual in that co-op conversions in New York City were typically proposed by buildings' owners. Ultimately, the conversion did not happen. In 1975, the building's owner proposed adding a security booth in the courtyard.

==== 390 West End Associates ownership ====
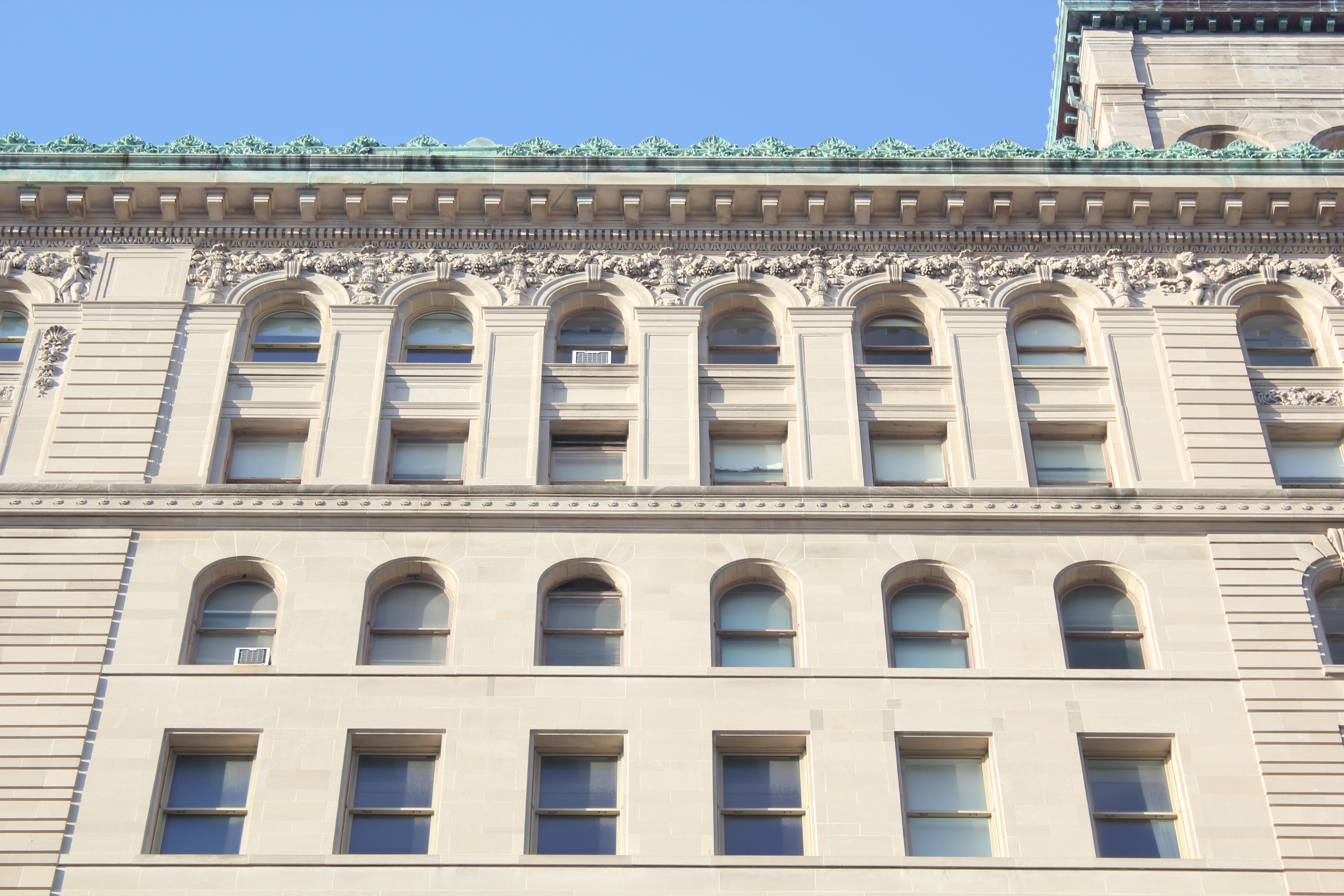
Detail of upper stories

A group called 390 West End Associates owned the Apthorp by the late 1980s. As a result of changes to state and city laws during the 1990s, landlords in New York City could renovate rent-regulated apartments to deregulate them, provided that the tenant earned over $250,000 a year and was paying over $2,000 per month.

In the late 1990s, to attract tenants such as bankers and company executives, 390 West End Associates renovated the building for $10 million. The facade was cleaned, and a gatehouse was added. The apartments' plumbing, wiring, electrical appliances, and air-conditioning were also renovated. They also installed a large marble statue in 1998, but many existing tenants considered the statue to be an extravagant expense, especially as their rents were rising. There was also growing discontent between existing rent-regulated tenants, who paid as little as $2,000 per month for eight-room units, and the landlords, who could rent the same apartment for $10,000 at market rates. Residents filed several lawsuits, alleging that several apartment buyers had bribed the landlords and existing tenants, and that the landlords were illegally deregulating apartments. After the corpse of a German tourist was discovered on the building's roof in early 1997, The New York Times wrote that "it struck some tenants not as an oddity but as a metaphor, a sign of how surreal life in the Apthorp had become". Joe Winogradoff, a longtime tenant, said in an interview that the Apthorp was "beautiful on the outside, but on the inside, it's a corpse".

The Times wrote in 2002 that the Apthorp "was evolving from comfortable West Side icon to gilded palace for the very, very rich". At the time, 390 West End Associates had asked the New York State Division of Housing and Community Renewal for permission to raise monthly rents by $25 per room so they could pay for the $1.8 million cost of elevator replacement. Two tenants' groups objected to this proposal, saying that the rent increases would cause some of the apartments to be deregulated. At a meeting in 2004, some residents claimed that the quality of services, including mail delivery, garbage disposal, and maintenance, had decreased because many longtime staff had retired. In addition, the New York Court of Appeals found in 2005 that the owners had rented the apartments to a man who agreed not to use the units as his primary residence, then subleased the apartments to people who did primarily live at the Apthorp. By then, market-rate tenants were regularly paying $8,000 to $20,000 per month.

=== Sale and condominium conversion ===
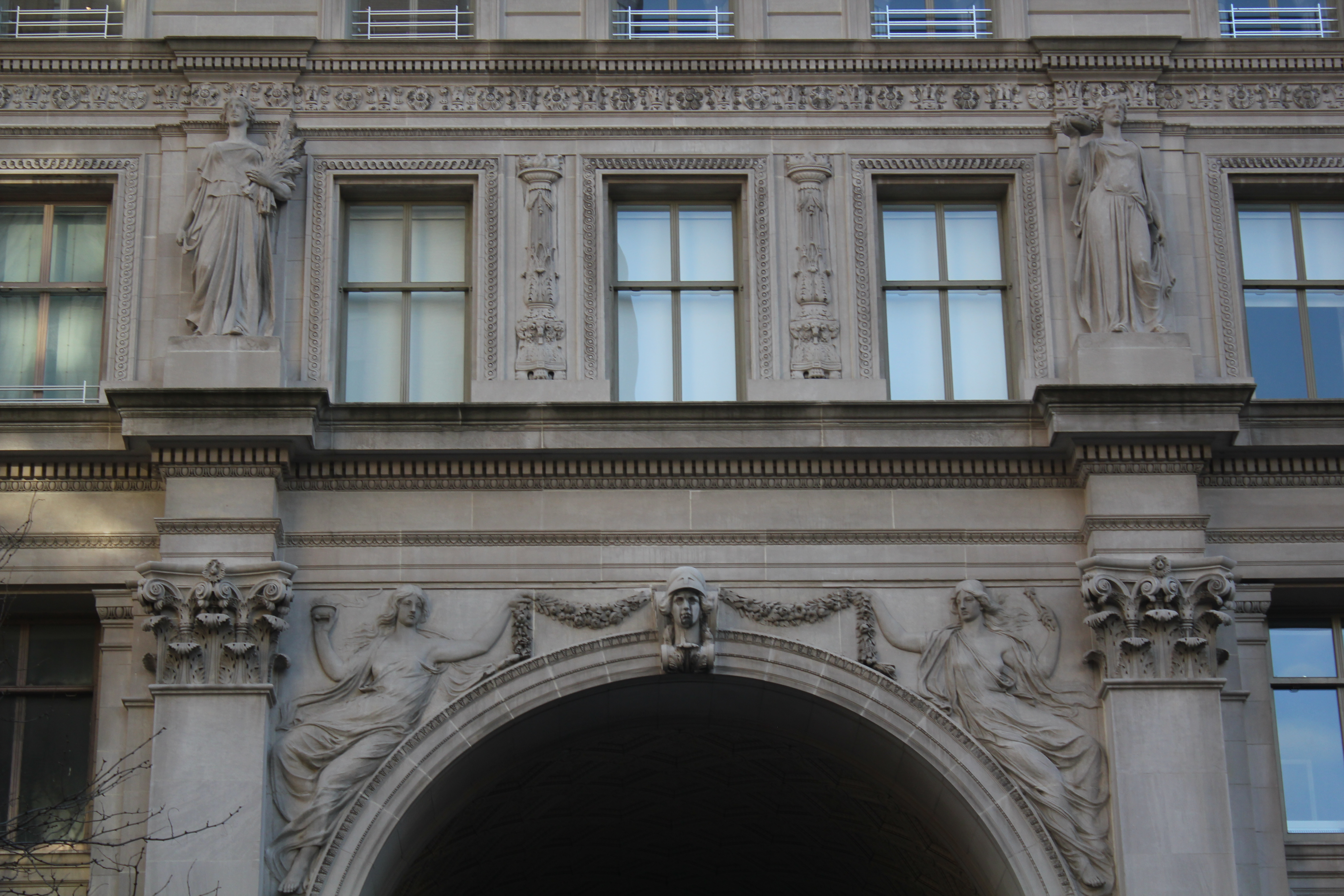
Detail of the stonework above the entrances

Apartment-building developer Maurice Mann agreed to buy the building in November 2006 for between $425 million and $426 million. This amounted to about $2.4 million per apartment, the highest per-unit price ever paid for a rental apartment building in Manhattan. Although several other bidders such as The Related Companies proposed converting the Apthorp into condominiums, Mann said he would not convert the building into condos. At the time of the sale, 96 of the 163 rental units were rent stabilized or rent controlled. Of the units that were not protected by rent regulation, 40 were occupied by residents who paid market-rate rent, while 27 were vacant.

==== Announcement and disputes ====
Shortly before the sale was finalized in March 2007, one of the project's key financiers withdrew from the transaction, so Mann obtained $55 million from Lev Leviev of Africa Israel Investments. The day after Mann acquired the Apthorp, Leviev bought a 50 percent stake in the building. Leviev implied the building would be converted to condominiums, with Africa Israel and Mann as co-sponsors of the project. Leviev and Mann had not publicly confirmed the condo-conversion rumors until mid-2007, when many tenants' rents were more than doubled, prompting some of the tenants to move out. Mann wished to market the Apthorp as a luxury condominium, but several former tenants said the building suffered from several issues, including lead paint, asbestos, brown water, and a lack of central air in some apartments. Leviev and Mann presented a red herring prospectus to tenants in August 2007, indicating that existing tenants would not be forcibly evicted when the condominium conversion started.

The Attorney General of New York approved Leviev and Mann's condo-offering plan in May 2008. The asking prices, nearly $3,000/ft^{2} ($32,000/m^{2}), made it "one of the most expensive condominium conversion projects" ever, according to The New York Times. Anglo Irish Bank provided a $385 million first mortgage loan, while Apollo Real Estate Advisors provided a $135 million second mortgage loan for the Apthorp's conversion. Ingrid Birkhofer and Fernando Papale of BP Architects were hired to renovate the units, and Prudential Douglas Elliman was hired to market the building. A holding company named JSR Capital bought 40 of the apartments and leased them out. The conversion was delayed because of disputes between the partners; objections from existing tenants; and the 2008 financial crisis. Many tenants were either unable to afford increased rents or had not been offered compensation for their apartments. The building's parking garage was also closed in 2008 after city officials discovered structural defects; the parking garage had reopened by 2010.

In December 2008, Apollo issued a $22.7 million capital call and asked the sponsors to present a business plan for the Apthorp, prompting Mann to sue Apollo. This prompted Apollo to threaten to foreclose on the building in January 2009. Mann's co-sponsors, the Feil Organization and Africa Israel, accused him of mismanaging the project; a judge gave the partners six days to resolve their dispute. The sponsors, who had previously agreed to seek arbitration from a rabbinical court if disagreements arose, could not even agree on the rabbinical court from which they would seek arbitration. Ultimately, Mann agreed to step down as the building's manager while retaining his ownership stake. Broadwall Management, a subsidiary of the Feil Organization, took over as the building's manager. Mann sued in March 2009 to prevent Africa Israel and the Feil Organization from refinancing the Apthorp with a loan from Anglo Irish Bank; the lawsuit was settled the next month. Mann later resigned from the project altogether.

==== Continued sales ====
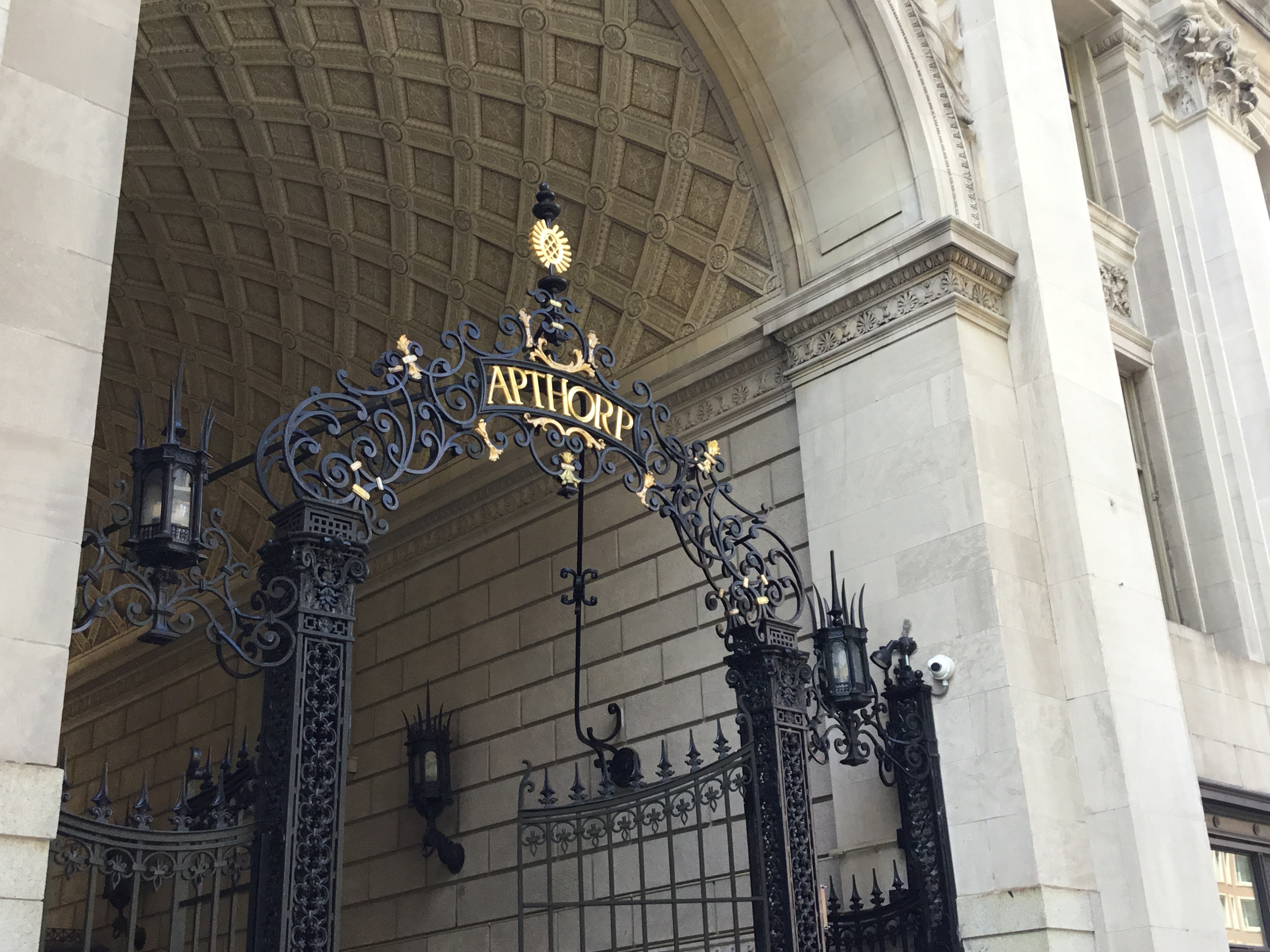
Detail of a gate at one of the entrances

To attract buyers, Africa Israel and the Feil Organization reduced condominium prices by approximately one-third, to $1,950/ft^{2} ($21,000/m^{2}), in early 2009. The sponsors hired Dolly Lenz as the building's broker in July 2009; at the time, 17 condos had gone into contract. The sponsors needed to sell 25 total units within six weeks. This was because of a state law that required 15 percent of condos to be sold within 15 months of the condominium offering being approved. Meanwhile, by late 2009, existing residents claimed that the renovations had caused numerous issues, including high asbestos and lead levels, as well as rodent infestations. This prompted city officials to investigate the Apthorp, and New York attorney general Andrew Cuomo conducted a detailed review of the building in early 2010. By then, the condo-conversion plan encountered so many problems that real-estate website Curbed published updates on the project under the headline "As the Apthorp Turns".

The attorney general's office declared the condominium offering effective in May 2010, allowing the sponsors to begin finalizing sales contracts. The first condo sale was finalized in July 2010, at which time 38 of the units had gone into contract. The Real Deal magazine reported that brokers expected to close about $100 million worth of contracts within six weeks; the condos were being sold for up to $16 million each. That month, Anglo Irish restructured the mortgage loan that it had placed on the property. Several buyers reportedly rented out their apartments, prompting the attorney general to investigate these allegations. The building's entire sales team resigned in September 2010, saying they had not been paid commission. Sales resumed after Corcoran Sunshine was hired as the building's sales agent that November. The building's retail condominium was sold in January 2011 for $37 million. By mid-2011, a quarter of the apartments had been sold, while about half of the total apartments remained under rent regulation. In addition, Stephen Sills Associates designed an amenity area in the basement the same year.

Even after the condo conversion, existing residents contended that the building still had significant issues. After Anglo Irish attempted to sell the building's first-mortgage debt, Africa Israel sued in September 2011 to prevent the debt from being sold. At the time, Anglo Irish was selling all of its commercial real-estate holdings in the United States. Bank officials claimed that the Apthorp's sponsors had forgone the right to sell the debt because they had failed to sell a certain number of condos and, thus, were in default on the loan. The attorney general's office also halted condominium sales at the Apthorp and ordered that the sponsors return buyers' deposits. According to attorney general Eric Schneiderman, the sponsors had made contradictory statements; Africa Israel had known as early as February 2011 that Anglo Irish had wished to sell the loan but had testified at the time that the sale would not affect the building or its sponsors. Africa Israel withdrew its lawsuit in December 2011, and a judge gave Anglo Irish Bank permission to sell the debt on the mortgage loan to Arefin U.S. Investment, a subsidiary of Area Property Partners.

==== Changes of sponsor ====
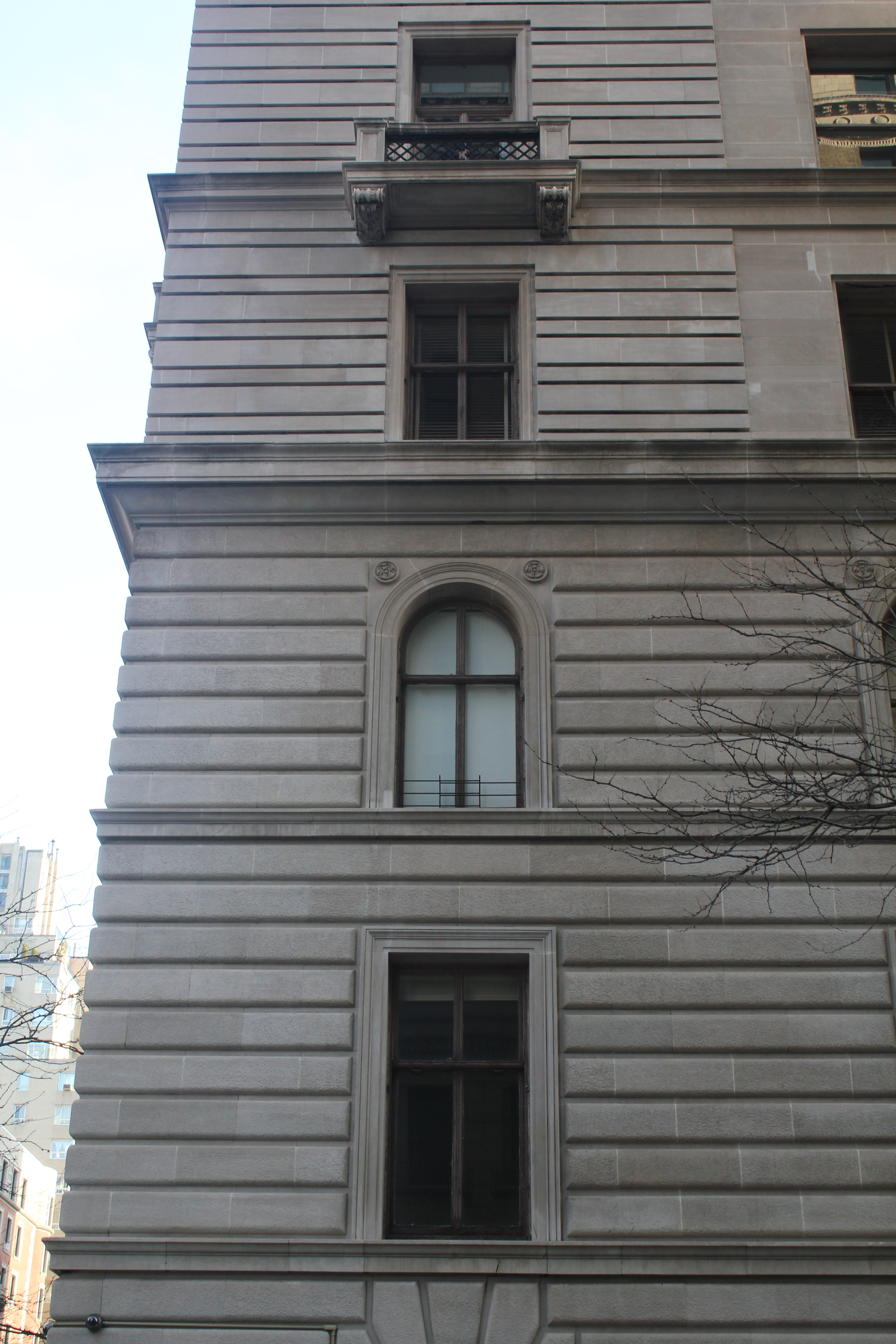
Lower-story windows at the southwest corner of the building

Africa Israel relinquished the Apthorp to Area Property Partners in August 2012, shortly after Arefin acquired the debt. The building was refinanced with a $125 million first mortgage from Macquarie Bank and a $60 million mezzanine loan from Macquarie and Arefin. At the time, only 50 of the 163 condos had been sold. That October, condominium owners voted to change the Apthorp's bylaws so the sponsors were no longer financially responsible for the unsold condominiums. Richard J. Mack of Area Property Partners said that, although the previous sponsors had already renovated the common areas of the building, "upgrading the finishes and combining units is something that we continue to do." After the leases for the 40 apartments owned by JSR Capital had expired, these units were also renovated.

The new sponsors hired Goldstein, Hill & West Architects in July 2013 to design a two-story addition above the roof, with four penthouse apartments. The sponsors said the new penthouses would provide funding for repairs to the rest of the building. Amid opposition from condo owners and other local residents, Manhattan Community Board 7 vetoed these plans in September 2013, and the LPC demurred on whether to approve the penthouses. The following January, the LPC requested that Hill West redesign the penthouses. The plans required unanimous consent from condo owners, but many owners had indicated that they would not support any version of the penthouse plan. When the sponsors presented a new plan for the penthouses in June 2014, numerous residents expressed disapproval. A scaled-down version of the penthouses was finally approved in August 2014.

The parking garage in the Apthorp's basement was sold in mid-2014 for $12.3 million. Around the same time, Ares Management (which had acquired Area Property Partners' holdings, including the Apthorp) fired Corcoran Sunshine as the building's brokerage firm. Ares instead had its own staff market the condominiums. A joint venture between Thor Equities and Imperial Companies bought 70 of the condominiums in 2016 for a total of $112 million. By 2024, the Apthorp's cash flow had decreased significantly, and income from the building covered only 88% of its expense. There were concerns that one of the building's main tenants, Chase Bank, would move out.

== Notable residents ==
Over the years, the Apthorp has attracted many media personalities, including writers, actors, and celebrities, as well as executives of NBC and Warner Brothers. Notable residents have included:

- Bob Balaban, actor
- George Balanchine, ballet choreographer
- Jennet Conant, writer
- Alber Elbaz, fashion designer
- Nora Ephron, writer and filmmaker
- Bertha Galland, actress
- Joseph Heller, writer
- Lena Horne, actress
- Robert H. Ingersoll, watchmaker
- Steve Kroft, journalist
- Cyndi Lauper, singer
- Conan O'Brien, television host
- Rosie O'Donnell, comedian
- Al Pacino, actor
- Ferdinand Pecora, New York Supreme Court justice
- Amanda Seyfried, actress, has an apartment on the top floor
- Eric Siday, musician famous for his advertising jingles using early electronic instruments. Siday used two of the rooms in his ten room apartment as an advanced electronic music studio.
- David Thornton, actor

In addition, former U.S. representative Beto O'Rourke once worked as a nanny for a family who lived in the Apthorp.

== Impact ==
In the 1970s, architectural critic Paul Goldberger described the Apthorp as one of the city's 10 best apartment buildings, saying: "Detailing is skillful throughout, with elaborate Corinthian pilasters over the entry [...] The three‐story‐high entrance arch is monumental yet welcoming, and the central court is splendid, a tranquil refuge from the clamor of adjacent Broadway." Goldberger, writing about the Apthorp and the nearby Belnord and Astor Court in 1979, said: "All of the buildings share the liability of courtyard apartment houses, which is poor light in all too many of the units, but they also share the ability of all good courtyard buildings to create far more than conventional buildings could a sense of a private, secure world." Christopher Gray wrote in 1987 that the Apthorp, along with the Ansonia and the Belnord, "gave a cosmopolitan electricity to" the section of Broadway north of 59th Street. A reporter for The New York Times wrote in 1997 that the Apthorp's name "hover[s] alongside those of the Ansonia, the Dakota and the Belnord in the pantheon of luxurious residences on the Upper West Side". The AIA Guide to New York City called the Apthorp "monumental and magnificent".

By the late 1980s, the Apthorp was being used as a filming location for about 30 movies and shows every year. Although this often attracted complaints from residents, the building's owner at the time, 390 West End Associates, said that tenants arranged many of these film shoots.

== See also ==
- List of buildings and structures on Broadway in Manhattan
- List of New York City Designated Landmarks in Manhattan from 59th to 110th Streets
- National Register of Historic Places listings in Manhattan from 59th to 110th Streets
