= Mill Neck station =

Train station in New York, US (1892–1998)

Mill Neck
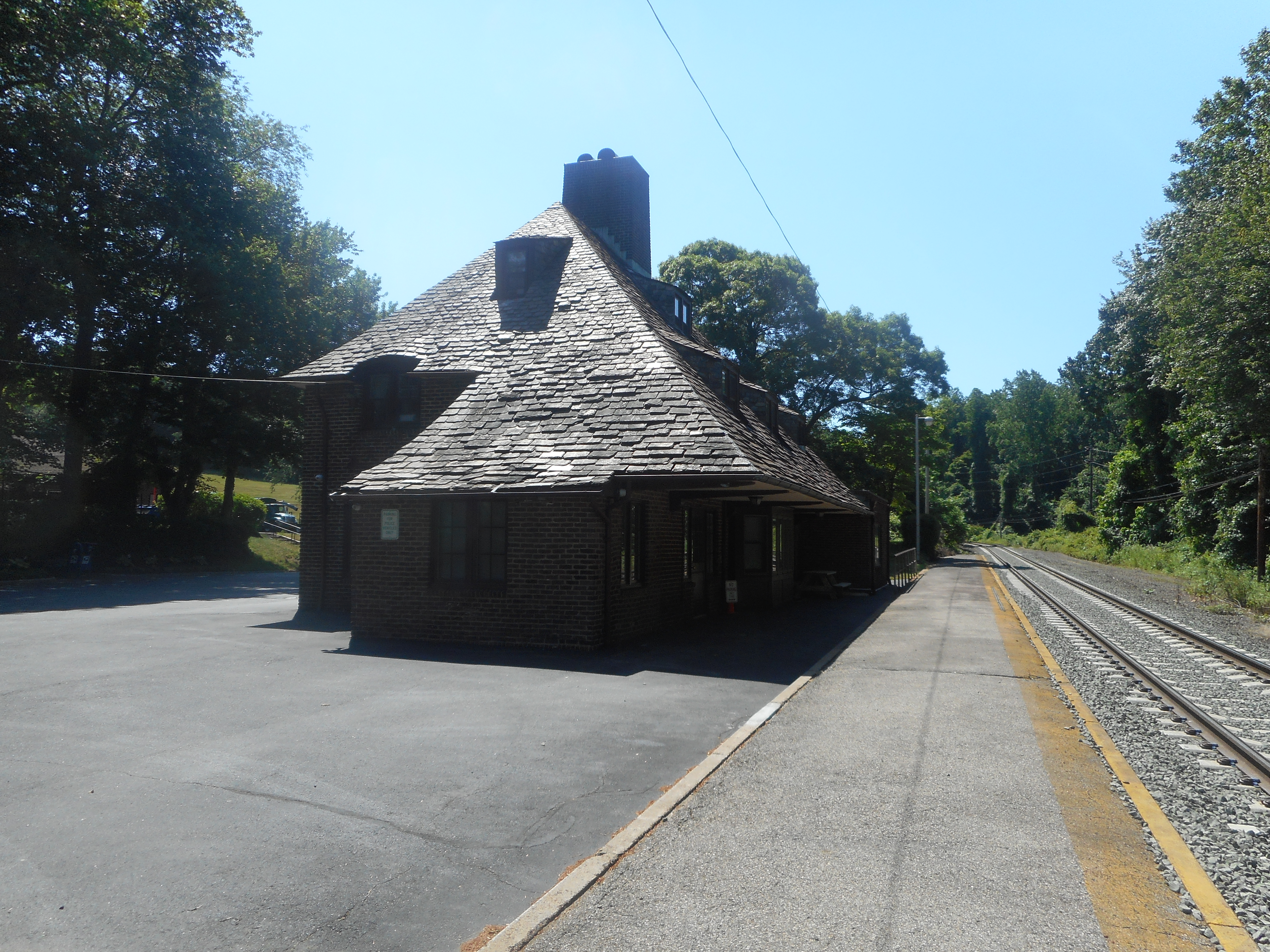
- June 2016 photo of the former Mill Neck station towards Oyster Bay.

General information
- Location: 17 Frost Mill Road; Mill Neck, New York
- Coordinates: 40.879583°N 73.562639°W
- Owner: Long Island Rail Road
- Line: Oyster Bay Branch
- Platforms: 1 side platform
- Tracks: 1

Other information
- Station code: None
- Fare zone: 7

History
- Opened: 1892
- Closed: March 16, 1998
- Former names: Bayville (1889–1892)

Former services
Preceding station	Long Island Rail Road	Following station
Locust Valley toward Penn Station, Jamaica or Long Island City	Oyster Bay Branch	Oyster Bay Terminus
Location

Mill Neck is a former rail station along the Oyster Bay Branch of the Long Island Rail Road. It is located between Oyster Bay and Locust Valley stations.

As of 2023, the historic former station depot is home to Mill Neck's village hall, post office, and police substation.

== History ==
The original station had the name of Bayville station and was located at the Kaintuck Lane railroad crossing on the west side of Shu Swamp. It first appeared on the timetable of October 1, 1889. Services were provided in a railroad boxcar.

In November 1892, it was renamed Mill Neck station and was moved to the Mill Neck Road crossing and a depot building was built. The building burned down on April 3, 1911. It was rebuilt in 1912 east of Mill Neck Road and north of the tracks. The two-story brick and stone structure was designed by Harrie Lindeberg at a cost of $26,950, funded by local residents and later given to the railroad.

The station burned again in 1918, then rebuilt in 1919 slightly to the east of the previous locations. At some point during the 20th Century, a post office was added to the station.

Mill Neck station closed on March 16, 1998, along with nine other stations.

== See also ==
- North Roslyn station
