= Locust Valley station =

Long Island Rail Road station in Nassau County, New York

Locust Valley
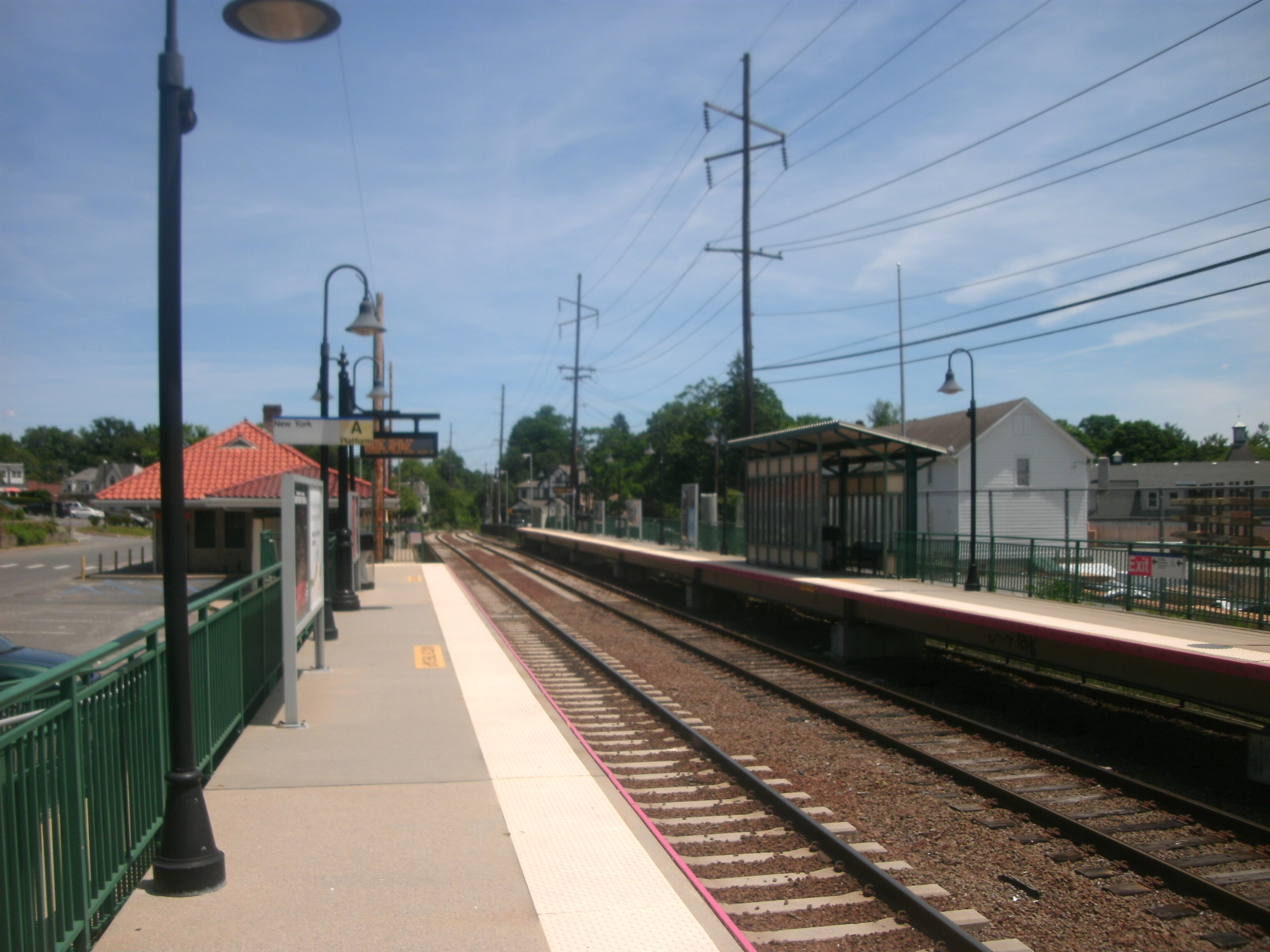
- The Locust Valley station, as seen in June 2012

General information
- Location: Birch Hill Road & Piping Rock Road; Locust Valley, NY
- Coordinates: 40.874251°N 73.598678°W
- Owner: Long Island Rail Road
- Line: Oyster Bay Branch
- Platforms: 2 side platforms
- Tracks: 2

Construction
- Parking: Yes; Town of Oyster Bay Residency, Off-Peak and other
- Cycle facilities: Yes
- Accessible: yes

Other information
- Station code: LVL
- Fare zone: 7

History
- Opened: April 19, 1869
- Rebuilt: 1872, 1885, 1906

Passengers
- 2012—2014: 576 per weekday

Services
Preceding station	Long Island Rail Road	Following station
Glen Cove toward Penn Station, Jamaica or Long Island City	Oyster Bay Branch	Oyster Bay Terminus
Former services
Preceding station	Long Island Rail Road	Following station
Glen Cove toward Penn Station, Jamaica or Long Island City	Oyster Bay Branch	Mill Neck toward Oyster Bay
Location

Locust Valley is a station on the Oyster Bay Branch of the Long Island Rail Road. It is located at Birch Hill Road and Piping Rock Road, south of Forest Avenue, in Locust Valley, Nassau County, New York.

== History ==
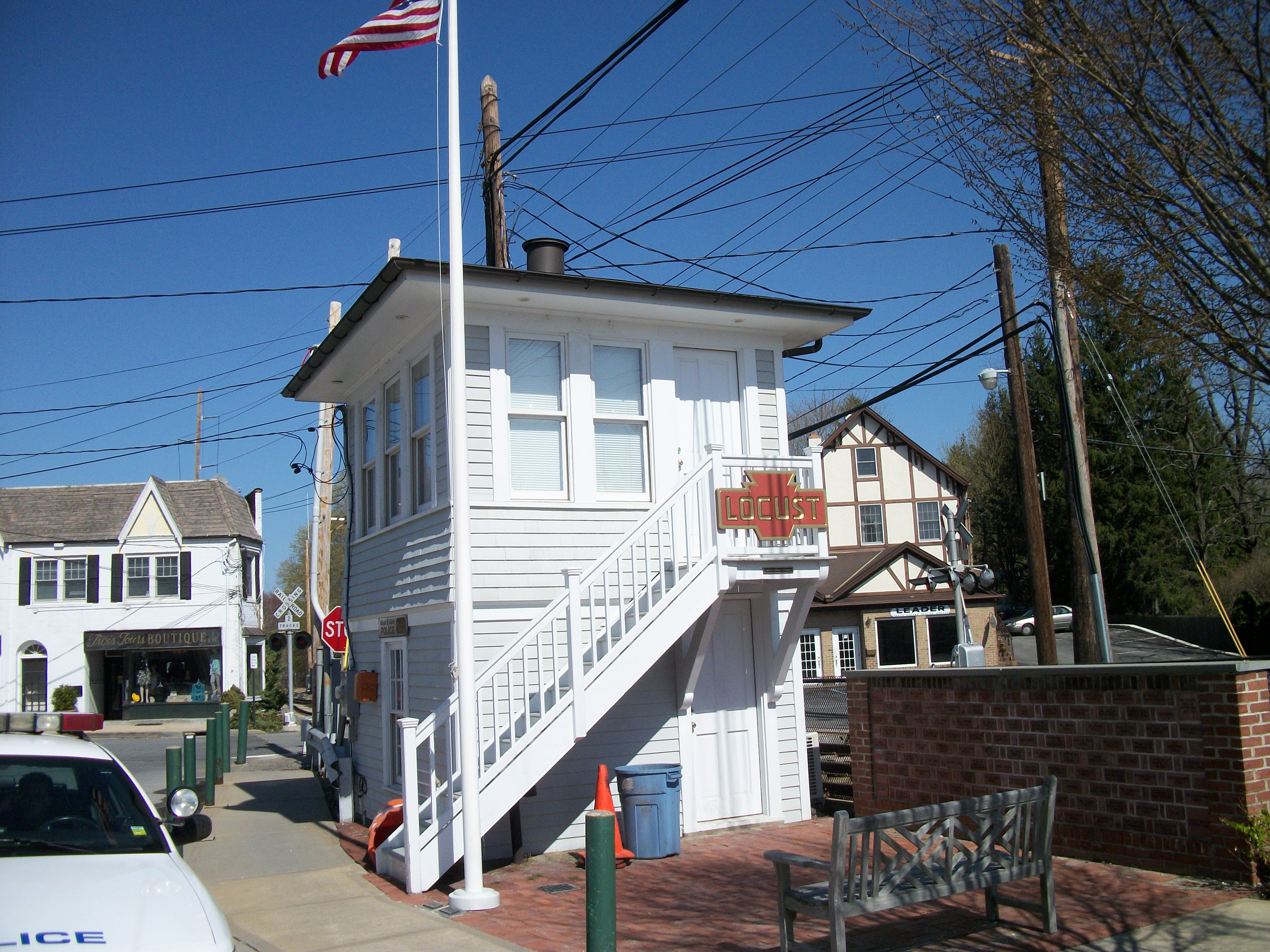
The former Locust Tower at Locust Valley station

The Locust Valley station was opened on April 19, 1869, and it served as the terminus of the line until 1889, upon the line's extension to Oyster Bay. On August 22, the turntable and engine house were moved from Glen Street and installed here. Charles Hallet finished a depot here in November 1872; it was photographed by Brainerd in 1878.

The station was rebuilt in November 1872, remodeled in 1885, and again rebuilt in December 1906, when the second station was moved to a private location. The current station building was erected in 1909. The station also contains an old-style wooden shelter on the eastbound tracks, and a former interlocking tower. This former tower, known as LOCUST Tower, now serves as a Nassau County Police Department booth for the Second Precinct's patrolmen assigned to the area.

== Station layout ==
This station has two high-level side platforms, each four cars long. A siding just west of the station served the Nassau-Suffolk Lumber until the late 1970s. The Oyster Bay Branch becomes a single track line a few hundred feet beyond the Birch Hill Road crossing at LOCUST interlocking. No bus access is available at the station.
