= Lillian Sefton Dodge Estate =

Historic house in New York, United States

- U.S. National Register of Historic Places
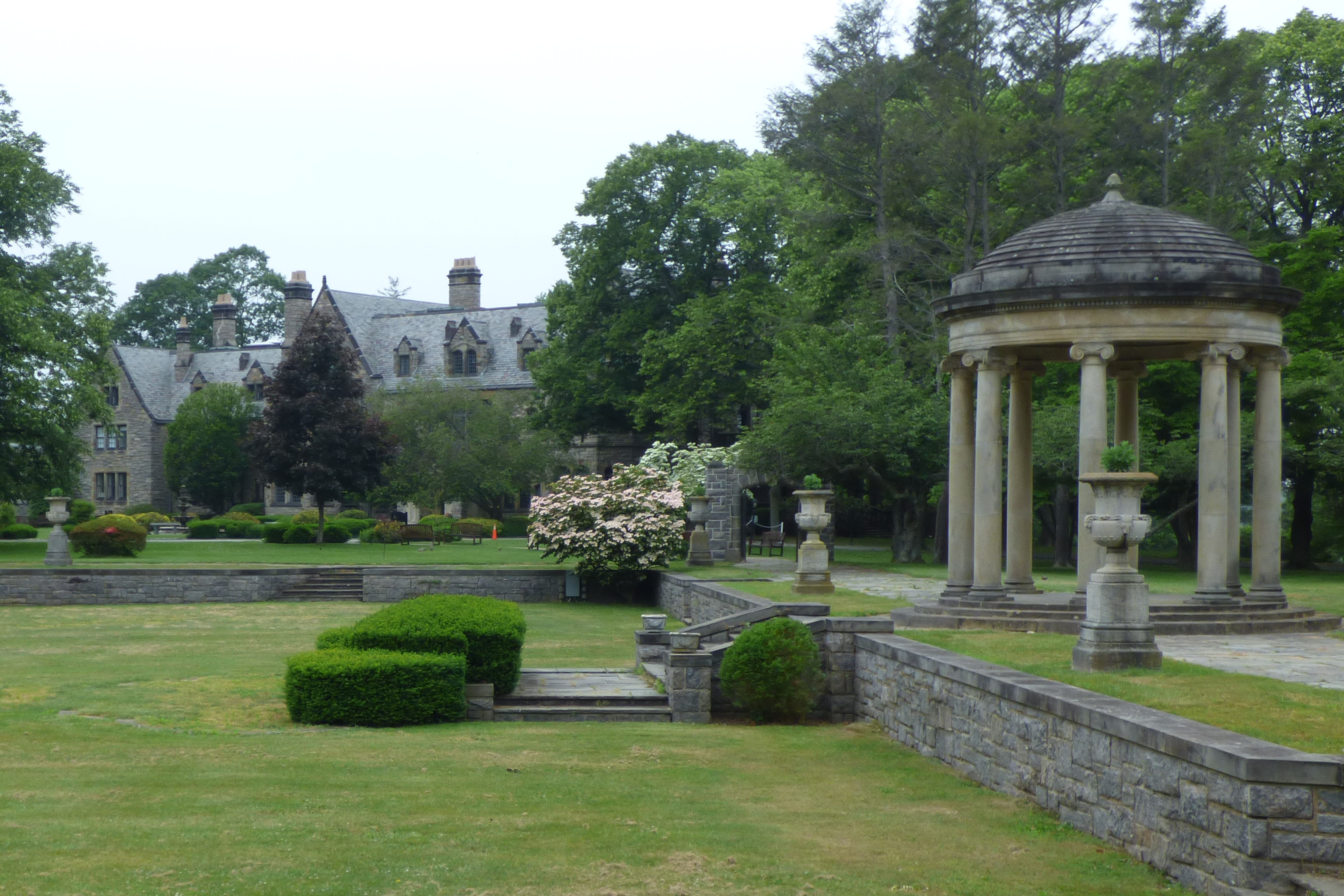
- The Formal Gardens

- Location within New York Location within the United States
- Location: Frost Mill Rd., Mill Neck, New York
- Coordinates: 40°52′39″N 73°33′34″W
- Area: 86 acres (35 ha)
- Built: 1922-1925
- Architect: Clinton & Russell
- Architectural style: Tudor Revival
- NRHP reference No.: 79001595
- Added to NRHP: July 22, 1979

Lillian Sefton Dodge Estate, also known as Sefton Manor and Mill Neck Manor Lutheran School for the Deaf, is a historic estate located at Mill Neck in Nassau County, New York. It has 34 rooms and is 60,000 square feet.

== History ==
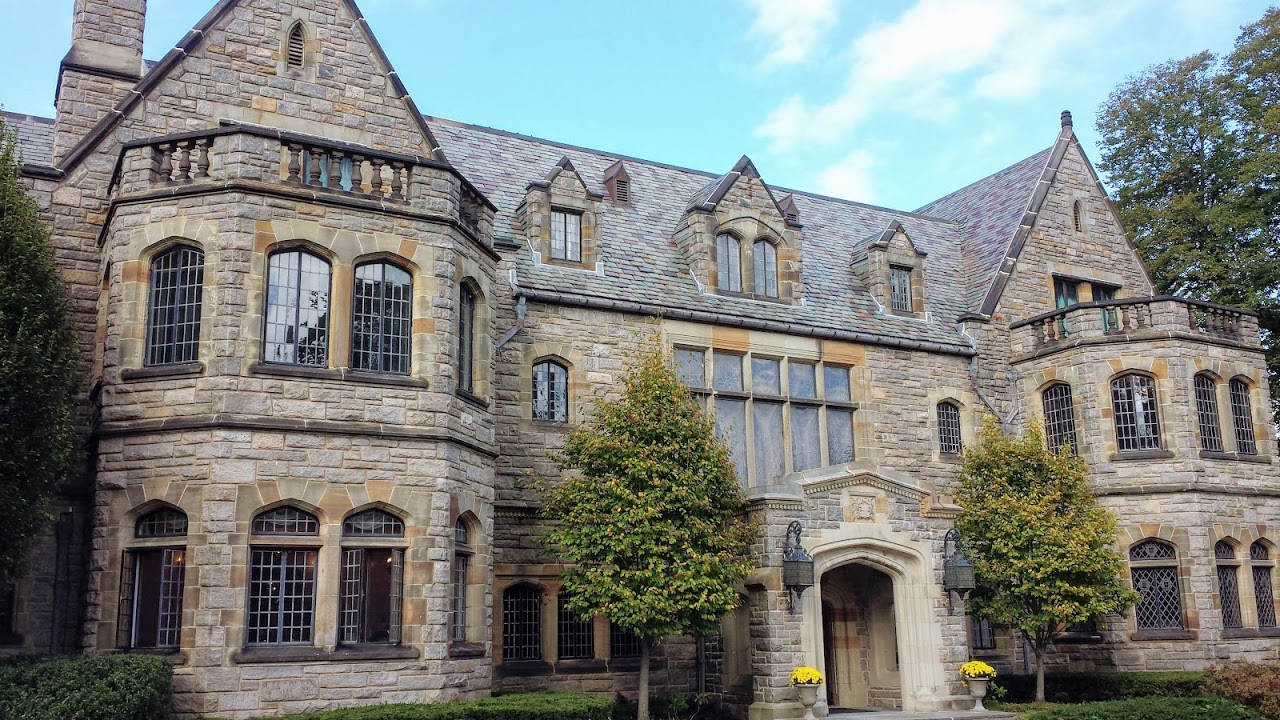
View of the front of Mill Neck Manor, former estate of Lillian Sefton Dodge.

It was designed in 1922 by the architectural firm Clinton and Russell for cosmetics executive Lillian Sefton Dodge. It was inspired by St. Catherine's Court in Somersetshire, England.

The manor house is a Tudor Revival style dwelling. It is two and one half stories high with a full basement, of steel frame construction and faced with brown Westchester granite and trimmed in tawny limestone. It has a gray slate roof perforated by granite dormers and chimneys.

One distinguishing feature of the house is its four large stained glass windows that depict five Shakespeare plays. Done by Charles Connick of Boston, in 1927 when Mr. Dodge had them put in they cost around $10,000 each. Below it is a 15th-century cathedral pew. Many of the sandstone fireplaces originated in Europe. Almost all of the interior iron work, from the door handles, to other accent pieces, were done by famed iron worker Samuel Yellin. Other interior features include: 400-year old entry doors, a 9-foot tall silverware safe, hand-sculpted patterned plaster ceilings, oak paneled walls and Renaissance chandeliers.

Also on the property is a Tudor style, half timber farm complex. The property also has a contributing formal garden designed by Charles Wellford Leavitt (1871–1928), garage, and greenhouse. The gardens feature boxwood shaped to resemble a sundial and is scattered with urns and stone temples. Plantings in the gardens featured tulips, azaleas, mountain laurels, magnolias and Japanese cherry trees. Large, multi-tiered fountains were imported from Venice but the water to the fountains were turned off after the property became a school.

It was listed on the National Register of Historic Places in 1979.

=== Current use ===
In 1949, Lutheran Friends of the Deaf purchased "Sefton Manor." The school was officially the Eastern Branch of the Lutheran School for the Deaf in Detroit of the Lutheran Church-Missouri Synod. On September 23, 1951, there was a dedication ceremony with over 3,000 in attendance. Melvine Luebke was named the headmaster for the school. He previously had worked for the Lutheran Institute for the Deaf in Detroit. The school officially opened on September 25, 1951, to 50 deaf children from as far away as Maryland. By 1956, Mill Neck Manor was fully accredited by New York State.

The manor was used for classes until 2002 when a new building was constructed for that purpose. Now, after undergoing an extensive restoration to return the home to as close to its original look as possible, starting in 2016 and ongoing today, the home is open for tours once a month, or by reservation. The Mill Neck Foundation also holds special events in the Manor. The Mill Neck school's enrollment for the 2015–16 school year was more than 106.

Today, the living room is used as the chapel for the Mill Neck School for the Deaf. The room still has the original wall sconces, ornamental plaster ceiling, fireplace and wood carvings over the mantle. It became the school's chapel in 1958. Stained glass windows surround the chapel.

=== Lillian Sefton Dodge ===
Lillian Sefton Dodge was the former president of Harriet Hubbard Ayer, Inc. a cosmetics manufacturing company. She began running the company after the death of her first husband, Vincent B. Thomas, in 1918. She sold the company to Lever Brothers in 1947 for over $5 million.

Lillian Dodge died on July 20, 1960, in New York City, New York. She was married twice. Her first husband, Vincent B. Thomas, died in 1918. Her second husband, Robert L. Dodge, a stained glass artist, died on July 16, 1940. He was 68 years old.

== In popular culture ==
Mill Neck Manor has been used as a movie set for seven films and as a setting for television shows such as Royal Pains, Homeland and Let the Right One In. It has also been featured in several commercials and in still photography pieces.
