= Mill Neck, New York =

- Village
- Incorporated Village of Mill Neck
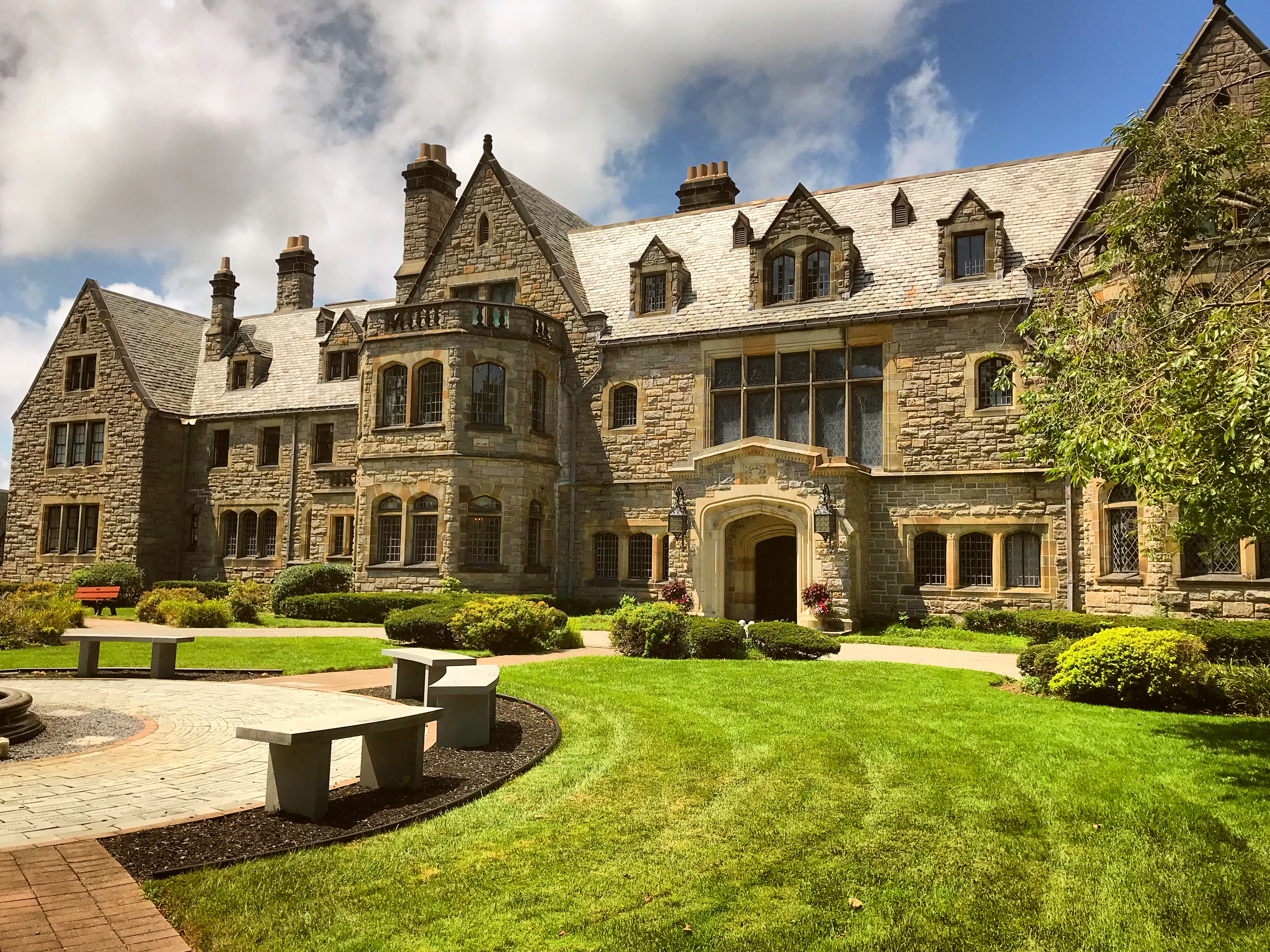
- The historic Lillian S. Dodge Estate, commonly known as Mill Neck Manor, in 2018

- Official seal of Mill Neck

- Location in Nassau County and the state of New York.

- Location on Long Island Location within the state of New York
- Coordinates: 40°53′20″N 73°33′22″W
- Country: United States
- State: New York
- County: Nassau
- Town: Oyster Bay
- Incorporated: 1925

Area
  - Total: 2.94 sq mi (7.61 km^{2})
  - Land: 2.61 sq mi (6.77 km^{2})
  - Water: 0.32 sq mi (0.84 km^{2})
- Elevation: 141 ft (43 m)

Population (2020)
  - Total: 1,054
  - Density: 403/sq mi (155.6/km^{2})
- Time zone: UTC-5 (Eastern (EST))
  - Summer (DST): UTC-4 (EDT)
- ZIP Codes: 11765 (Mill Neck); 11560 (Locust Valley); 11771 (Oyster Bay)
- Area codes: 516, 363
- FIPS code: 36-47405
- GNIS feature ID: 0957256
- Website: millneckvillage.com

Mill Neck is a village in the Town of Oyster Bay in Nassau County, on the North Shore of Long Island, in New York, United States. The population was 1,054 at the time of the 2020 census.

== History ==
Mill Neck incorporated as a village in 1925. Many Gold Coast-era estates were constructed in Mill Neck during the Gold Coast era.

Mill Neck Village Hall, which also houses the village's branch of the United States Post Office, is located in the former station house of the Mill Neck Long Island Rail Road station. This station, which was located on the Oyster Bay Branch, closed in 1998 due to low ridership. The Old Brookville Police Department also has a substation within the building.

== Geography ==
According to the United States Census Bureau, the village has a total area of 2.9 square miles (7.5 km^{2}), of which 2.6 square miles (6.7 km^{2}) is land and 0.3 square miles (0.78 km^{2}) (11.95%) is water.

According to the United States Environmental Protection Agency and the United States Geological Survey, the highest point in Mill Neck is Mill Hill.

== Demographics ==
Historical population
Census	Pop.	Note	%±
1930	516		—
1940	101		−80.4%
1950	505		400.0%
1960	701		38.8%
1970	982		40.1%
1980	959		−2.3%
1990	977		1.9%
2000	825		−15.6%
2010	997		20.8%
2020	1,054		5.7%
U.S. Decennial Census

=== Racial and ethnic composition ===
Mill Neck village, New York – Racial and ethnic composition Note: the US Census treats Hispanic/Latino as an ethnic category. This table excludes Latinos from the racial categories and assigns them to a separate category. Hispanics/Latinos may be of any race.
Race / Ethnicity (NH = Non-Hispanic)	Pop 2000	Pop 2010	Pop 2020	% 2000	% 2010	% 2020
White alone (NH)	730	849	802	88.48%	85.16%	76.09%
Black or African American alone (NH)	2	12	20	0.24%	1.20%	1.90%
Native American or Alaska Native alone (NH)	0	0	0	0.00%	0.00%	0.00%
Asian alone (NH)	39	61	67	4.73%	6.12%	6.36%
Native Hawaiian or Pacific Islander alone (NH)	0	0	0	0.00%	0.00%	0.00%
Other race alone (NH)	4	9	1	0.48%	0.90%	0.09%
Mixed race or Multiracial (NH)	4	9	32	0.48%	0.90%	3.04%
Hispanic or Latino (any race)	46	57	132	5.58%	5.72%	12.52%
Total	825	997	1,054	100.00%	100.00%	100.00%

=== 2000 census ===
As of the census of 2000, there were 825 people, 295 households, and 241 families residing in the village. The population density was 319.8 inhabitants per square mile (123.5/km^{2}). There were 326 housing units at an average density of 126.4 per square mile (48.8/km^{2}). The racial makeup of the village was 92.00% White, 0.24% African American, 4.73% Asian, 2.42% from other races, and 0.61% from two or more races. Hispanic or Latino of any race were 5.58% of the population.

There were 295 households, out of which 34.6% had children under the age of 18 living with them, 74.9% were married couples living together, 5.8% had a female householder with no husband present, and 18.0% were non-families. 13.6% of all households were made up of individuals, and 6.4% had someone living alone who was 65 years of age or older. The average household size was 2.80 and the average family size was 3.07.

In the village, the population was spread out, with 23.3% under the age of 18, 4.4% from 18 to 24, 24.7% from 25 to 44, 31.0% from 45 to 64, and 16.6% who were 65 years of age or older. The median age was 44 years. For every 100 females, there were 97.4 males. For every 100 females age 18 and over, there were 97.2 males.

The median income for a household in the village was $125,477, and the median income for a family was $145,643. Males had a median income of $95,429 versus $51,528 for females. The per capita income for the village was $77,899. About 2.3% of families and 2.9% of the population were below the poverty line, including none of those under age 18 and 3.6% of those age 65 or over.

== Government ==
As of August 2021, the Mayor of Mill Neck is Peter Quick, the Deputy Mayor is John K. Colgate, Jr., and the Village Trustees are John K. Colgate, Jr., Randolph Harrison, Joshua Kugler, Alice G. Smith and Peter Quick.

== Education ==
=== School district ===
The Village of Mill Neck is split between the Locust Valley Central School District and the Oyster Bay–East Norwich Central School District. As such, children who reside within Mill Neck and attend public schools go to school in one of these two districts depending on where in Mill Neck they live.

=== Library district ===
Mill Neck is split between the Locust Valley Library District and the Oyster Bay–East Norwich Library District.
