= Graham Court =

Apartment building in Manhattan, New York

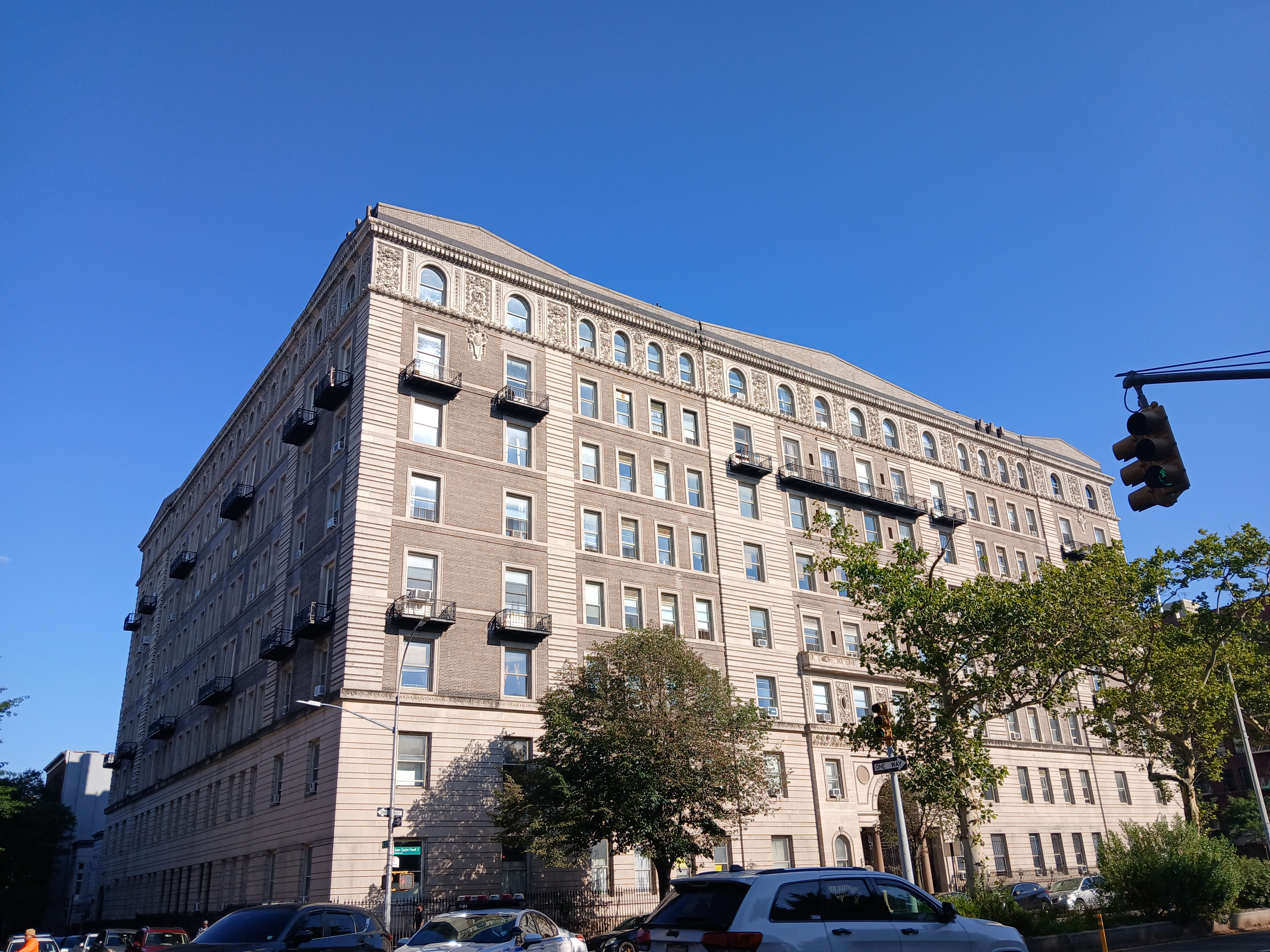

General information
- Architectural style: Italian Renaissance
- Location: Harlem, Manhattan, New York City, 1921-1935(or 1923-1937) 1925 Adam Clayton Powell Jr. Boulevard, New York, NY 10026
- Coordinates: 40°48′12.26″N 73°57′8.28″W
- Construction started: 1898
- Completed: 1901

Height
- Height: Eight stories

Technical details
- Floor count: 8

Design and construction
- Architect: Clinton and Russell
- Main contractor: Developed by William Waldorf Astor

Graham Court is a historic apartment building in Harlem, Manhattan, New York City, along Adam Clayton Powell Jr. Boulevard between West 116th and 117th Streets. It was commissioned by William Waldorf Astor, designed by the architects Clinton and Russell, and constructed in 1899–1901 as part of the great Harlem real-estate boom.

The New York City Landmarks Preservation Commission designated the building a landmark in 1984, characterizing the Graham Court as "one of the premier reminders of the urban development of Harlem at the turn of the century" and "one of the signal achievements in the history of the apartment house in New York City." The New York Times suggested that it might be Harlem's "equivalent to the Dakota".

== Description ==
Graham Court has 800 rooms, currently divided into 93 apartment units. The property is eight stories and contains eight elevators. It runs the full length of the block between 116th and 117th Streets along Adam Clayton Powell Jr. Boulevard, with a depth of 175 feet (53 m) on the side streets.

=== Exterior ===
It is a "boxy mass" designed in the mode of an Italian palazzo. The first two floors of the exterior facade are of rusticated limestone, with tan or gray brick above and a crowning story of foliate terra cotta capped by a copper cornice.

==== Main facade ====
The building is divided horizontally into three parts. The main facade, on Adam Clayton Powell, Jr., Boulevard, is divided into five parts vertically as well, having slightly projecting central and end pavilions. The two-story rusticated base, consisting of limestone set in alternating wide and narrow horizontal bands which show only the horizontal joints, has simple rectangular fenestration and rises above an areaway with molded water table (architecture) and wrought-iron railing.

Capping the base is a projecting stringcourse which is decorated with a wave molding on the center and end pavilions. The monumental main entrance, leading through an arcade to the interior courtyard, is a Palladian motif consisting of a central molded arch, with a keystone ornamented with a cartouche, rising from an interrupted entablature which is supported by pinkish polished granite columns of composite order and pilasters with entasis. A pair of large central ornamental wrought-iron gates is flanked by smaller gates. The spandrels carry inset granite roundels. The entrance is flanked by round-arched first-story windows with molded surrounds and keystones and second-story rectangular windows with surrounds.

The inscription "Graham Court" appears above the arch, flanked by horizontal terra cotta panels with anthemion motif decoration. The arcade leading into the courtyard continues the treatment of columns and pilasters. A barrel vault, faced with Guastavino tiles, rises from the entablature and is decorated with broad ribs which extend from the columns.

The pavilions of the midsection of the building, extending from the third through the seventh stories, are framed by quoins; the rusticated stone bands of the central pavilion are punctuated by fenestration. All windows have simple rectangular terra cotta surrounds; those at the fourth, fifth, and seventh stories of the center most portion of the central pavilion have entablatures.

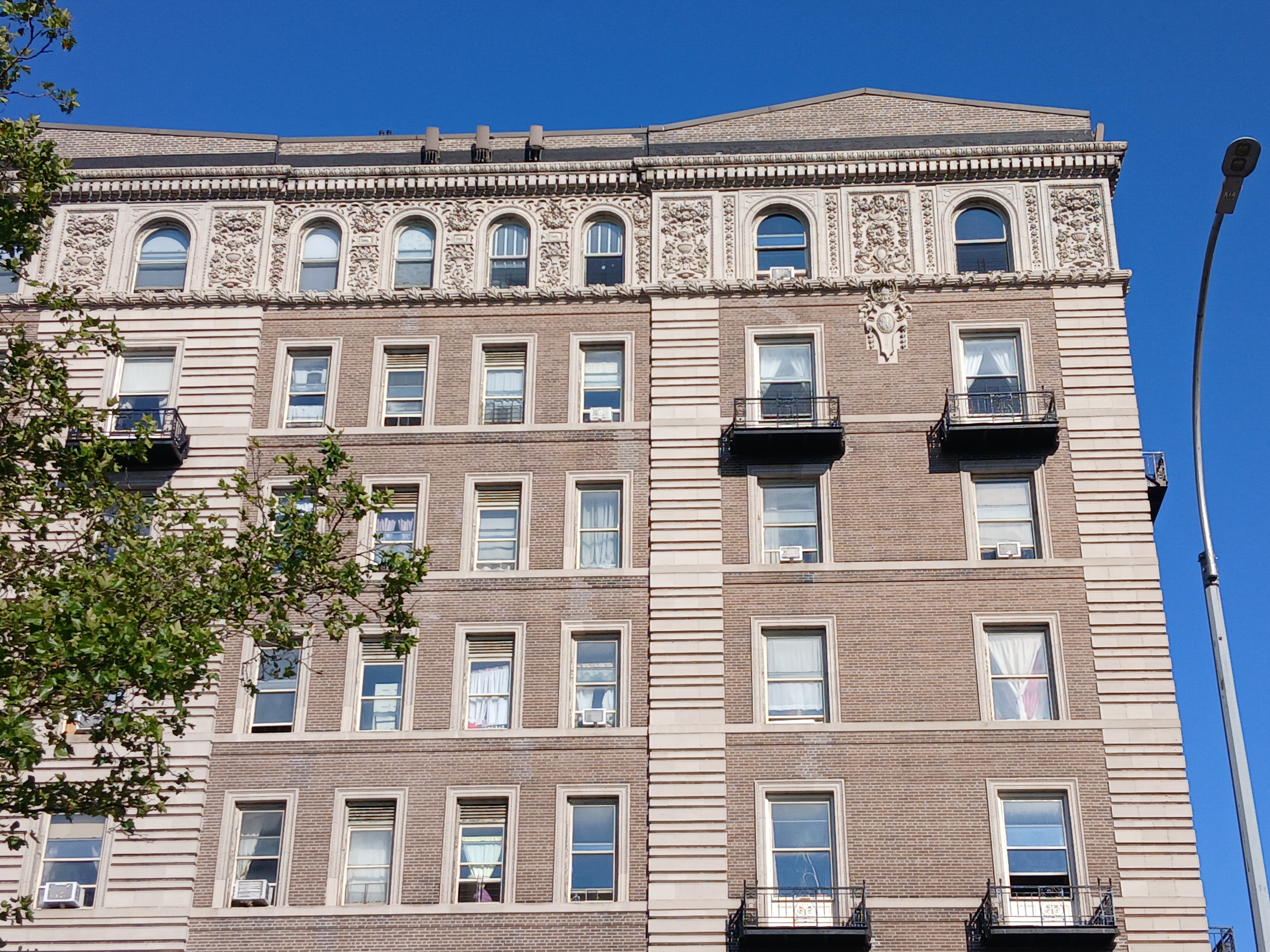
Upper stories, seen from Adam Clayton Powell Jr. Boulevard and 116th Street

Each floor is separated by a continuous stone stringcourse. Above the entrance on the third story, between the windows, are terra cotta panels of foliate design. The fourth floor of the central pavilion has a stone balcony with cartouches (part of the coping is missing), and there are also iron balconies with a harp motif at the fourth-story end and a seventh-story central and end pavilions.

The seventh story is capped by an ornamental terra-cotta stringcourse (reeds bound by bay leaf garlands) with central and end cartouches. The top story has alternating round-arched windows and terra-cotta panels with decoration of classical derivation. The metal cornice, originally denticulated and modillioned, has been removed; remaining are the dentils and an egg-and-dart motif molding. A parapet wall, acting originally as subtle pediments for the central and end pavilions, is now fully exposed and covered with tar.

==== Side facades ====
The two side faces are identical mirror images (except for two round-arched entrances at either end on 116th Street and one larger one at the western side on 117th Street) and continue the same treatment as the main facade. The two side facades are arranged vertically as three pavilions. The unarticulated rear facade is of plain brick.

==== Courtyard ====
The courtyard, reached by an open arcaded entry from Seventh Avenue, is 79 feet by 108 feet square and was originally planted with grass and ornamental shrubbery. It also gives cross ventilation to every apartment.

One of the great issues in apartment design at the turn of the century was the disposition of the courts - often reduced to mere air shafts. But because of its size, Graham Court could have a courtyard shared with no other building.

In the courtyard, a driveway and sidewalk encircle an oval garden area with walks in a cross pattern which originally had a central fountain (the stone base remains). Eight iron lampposts were located in the oval and one pair flanked each of the four interior entrances (only four posts, one globe, and the stone pedestals remain). The reverse of the front facade entry arch, on the courtyard, is similar to it but without the keystone and is flanked by a pair of blind oval bulls-eyes with top and bottom keystones.

The building is entered from the courtyard through four porticoes with columns of composite order, Guastavino tile ceilings, and balustrades (part of the one at the northeast corner is missing) which are set against the angled corner. Wood double doors with glass central panels and transoms are surrounded by egg-and-dart moldings and are flanked by small round-arched windows (most of which have been filled with polished granite). The courtyard walls maintain the building's overall horizontal division and materials, except that the base is one story high and is composed only of wide limestone bands and the brick is set in horizontal bands with plain and denticulated stringcourses.

The first story has simple rectangular fenestration; the windows of the second through seventh stories have flat-arched lintels with triple keystones (some have end voussoirs), except for the second-story corner windows above the entrance porticoes which have molded surrounds with cartouche keystones. The top story has round-arched windows with keystones and is capped by a copper cornice with egg-and-dart and patterned motif moldings.

=== Interior ===
The planning of the apartments was a bit crude. Andrew Alpern, in his book Apartments for the Affluent, says the building has an "awkward circulation pattern" and the bedrooms tend to be small and narrow. But each apartment combines features - oak kitchen cabinets, mosaic foyer floors, mahogany and oak flooring, paneled dining rooms and multiple fireplaces - that later, simpler buildings could only sample.

== History ==
=== Origins ===
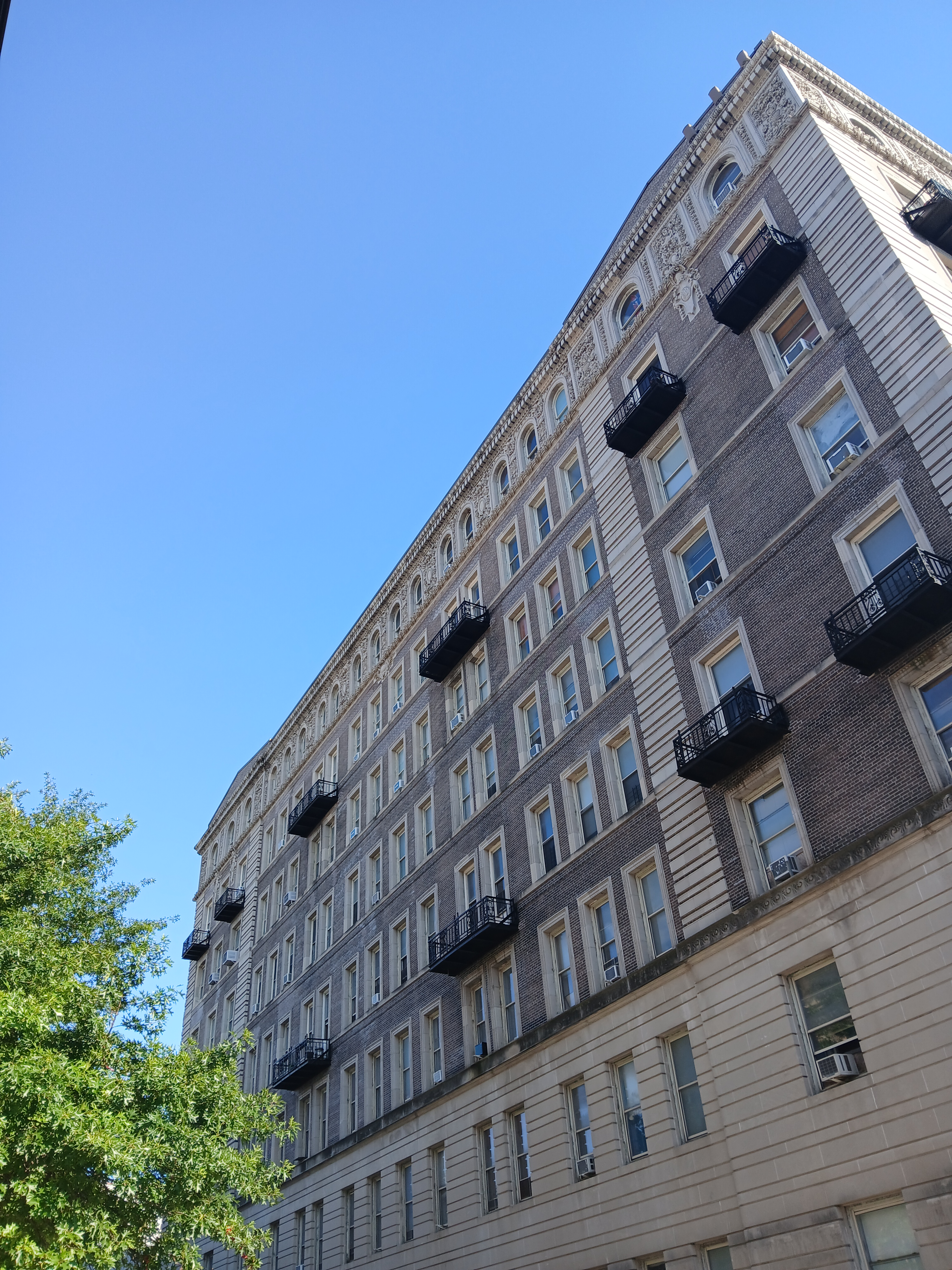
The 117th Street elevation

The land on which Graham Court stands was acquired by William Backhouse Astor in the 1860s and was transferred to William Waldorf Astor by the Astor estate in 1890. Graham Court was constructed by architects Clinton and Russell at an approximate cost of $500,000 as one of New York City's largest and finest "flathouses" (apartment buildings). The builder was John Downey.

The Graham Court then got caught in the market collapse of 1904–05, which hit Harlem particularly hard. Moving up from the West Side, blacks turned Harlem into a "community where Negroes as a whole are better housed than in any other part of the country," according to historian Gilbert Osofsky. The building remained under the control of the William Waldorf Astor estate until 1933.

The building was one of the last major apartment buildings in Harlem to become integrated. One source says that it was not opened to black residents until 1928; another asserts that it did not rent to any black tenants until 1933, when new management's decision to "accept colored was accompanied by a reduction in services and an increase in the reduced, Depression-era rents." Many eminent blacks moved in, including Dr. Cyril Dolly, a physician who organized the Consolidated Tenants League to protect tenants. Famous residents also include James Pemberton and his wife Edna. James Pemberton was member of the state assembly representing Harlem, part of the Tammany Hall establishment and led protests at Yankee Stadium pressing for the integration of the game. On opening day 1945, after the acquisition of the team by MacPhail, Webb and Topping, Pemberton led a group of protesters carrying signs that asked, "If we can pay, why can't we play?" and, "If we can stop bullets, why not balls?"

=== Decline ===
By the 1960s, the building had begun a precipitous decline. Then, Graham Court fell into city hands in 1978, when its owner failed to pay taxes.

In 1979, Mohammed Siddiqui, a pharmacist, bought the building for $55,000 and a promise to pay $150,000 in back taxes. The sellers were Bankers Trust and the Astor Trust. But Siddiqui fell behind on his tax bill and, according to the tenants association, let the building slide further into disrepair. In the meantime, some residents said drugs were being sold illegally from apartments in the building. During this six-year window of ownership by Siddiqui, tenants ran the building with the help of a court-appointed administrator.

By 1986, the city moved to foreclose the building from Mohammed Siddiqui for nonpayment of $933,000 in taxes. It looked as though the city would foreclose on the building for delinquent taxes, allowing the tenants to buy their apartments for a mere $250 each under a city sale program. But in mid-February, only hours before the foreclosure was to become final, the landlord took advantage of the city's four-month grace period and handed $933,000 to city tax collectors to reclaim the building. Then, Mr. Siddiqui, whose pharmacist license was suspended that year for three months for "negligence" in handling prescription drugs, sold it for $2 million to Leon Scharf, a West Side real estate investor with a large apartment building portfolio throughout Manhattan. In 1986, Mr. Scharf told the New York Times that he was spending $1 million on improvements that year, and was optimistic about the future of the building: Eventually, maybe we would go to a co-op plan he said.

=== Revitalization ===
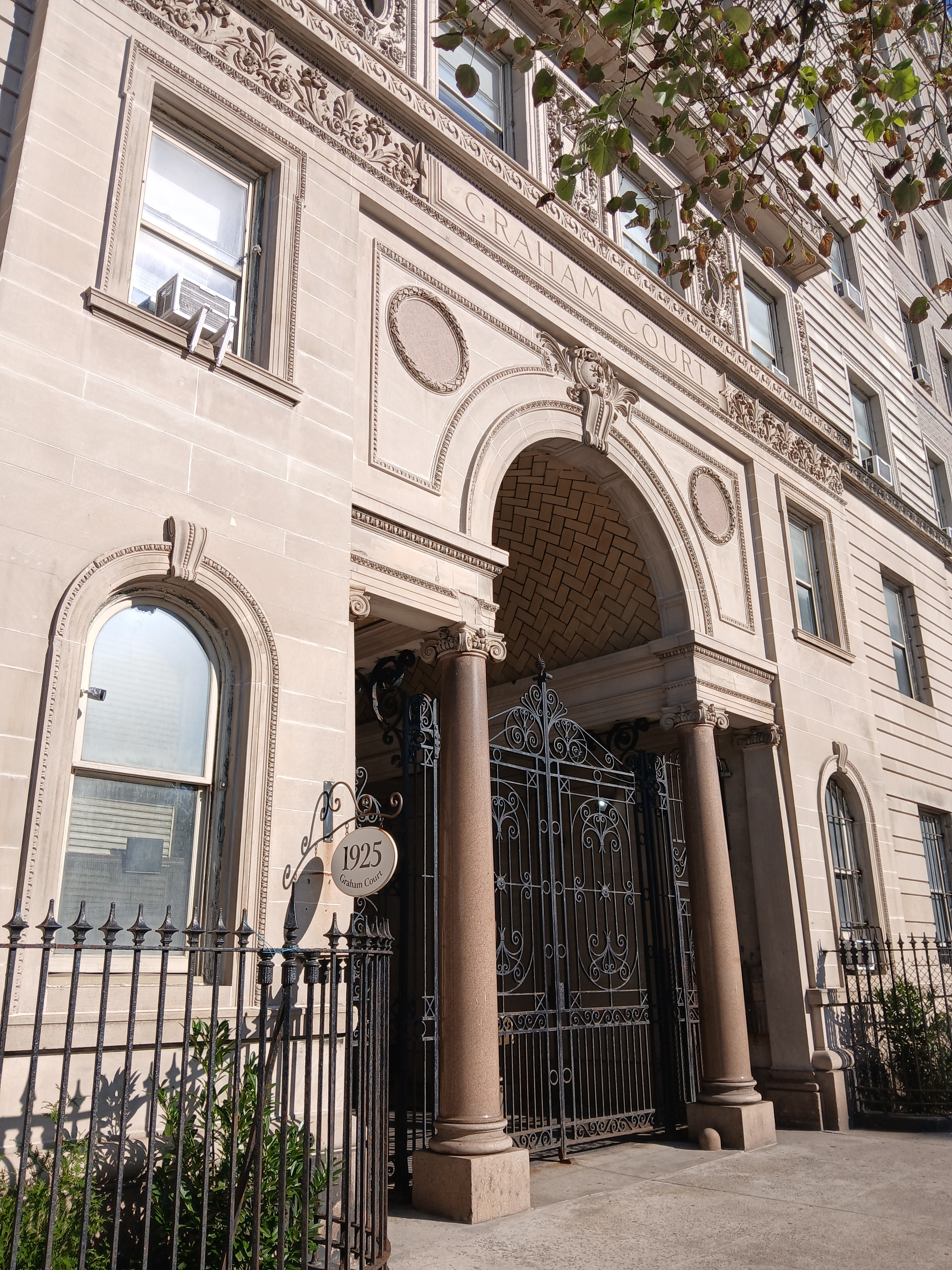
The entrance

In the early 1990s, the Graham Court Owners Corp. began a multiyear renovation of the building's interior, which is not protected by the building's landmark code; the renovations would allow the owners to raise rent The New York Times cited tenants who said that the purpose of the renovation was "to raise rents and eventually turn the building into a co-op". In 1996, the landlord received permission from the New York City Landmarks Preservation Commission to install new windows after an inspection found that 20 percent of them were beyond repair. The plan called for replacing the building's 400 original mahogany windows with aluminum ones; an employee of the landlord said the company planned to install the windows and seek rent increases. In the summer of 2000, in a survey by the tenants association, only two of 55 respondents wanted their windows replaced; most wanted them repainted and repaired. Some tenants were quoted as saying that was unnecessary, and was contrived to drive up the rent, which can be increased if certain work is done to the building. The tenants enlisted the support of Community Board 10, hoping that the Department of Housing and Community Renewal would reject the owner's request for a rent increase.

In 1998, Mr. Scharf sold the majority interest to the Graham Court Owners' Corporation, under the management company "Residential Management". The Graham Court Owners' Corporation still owned the building in 2026.

As early as 2000, the guardhouse was gone, and as of 2006, the building had no doorman or intercom system. While a security guard on duty from 4 p.m. to midnight would admit visitors, the rest of the time tenants had to go down to the gate to greet guests. Residents said there was a direct connection between the lack of security and the regular presence of drug dealers, some of whom live in the building. In 2007, tenants sought a reduction in rents on the grounds that a reduction in building security constituted a reduction in building-wide services, and got a ruling in their favor from the DRA (Directory and Resource Administrator). Landlord then signed a settlement agreement with tenants and filed an application to decrease or modify services. The DRA granted landlord's application.

== Media and notable residents ==
In 1990, movie producer George Jackson used Graham Court as the setting for a crack factory in New Jack City, a depiction which the New York Magazine real estate section characterized as "all-too-believable".

The Graham is currently home to notable residents such as radio talk show host Alex Bennett, who fell in love with the apartment complex from the first time he and his girlfriend saw it. Interior designer Sheila Bridges lives in the same unit in Graham Court where the director Spike Lee shot his 1991 film Jungle Fever. Bridges, whose unit still contains the original built-in cabinetry and wainscoting, had to clean up "the fake-blood stain left over from the scene where Samuel L. Jackson is shot at the end".
