= Greathed Manor =

Victorian country house in Surrey, England

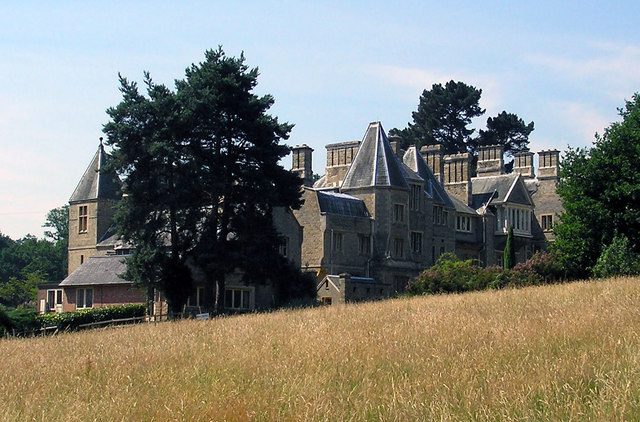
- "An extreme example of a justly neglected type"

- Location within Surrey
- 51°09′42″N 0°01′10″E
- Type: House
- Location: Dormansland, Surrey

History
- Built: 1862-8

Site notes
- Architect: Robert Kerr
- Architectural style: Gothic Revival
- Governing body: Privately owned

Listed Building – Grade II
- Official name: Greathed Manor
- Designated: 25 April 1984
- Reference no.: 1377578

Greathed Manor, Dormansland, Surrey, is a Victorian country house. Designed by the architect Robert Kerr in 1862–68, it is a Grade II listed building.

== History ==
Greathed Manor, originally called Ford Manor, was designed by Robert Kerr for the Spender-Clay family, and was completed in 1868. The actress Joyce Grenfell was related to the family by marriage and often visited the house. Accounts of her time there are described in her autobiography “Joyce Grenfell Requests the Pleasure”. In 1904 Herbert Spender-Clay, MP and founder of the 1922 Committee, married Pauline Astor, daughter of the American billionaire William Waldorf Astor. The couple lived at the house until 1937.

Greathed Manor was requisitioned by the British Government during both World Wars. In the Great War it became a hospital for wounded American Army officers. In the Second World War it was used as the Headquarters of a Canadian Armored Division in the run-up to D-Day. It acted as temporary premises for the London College of Divinitybetween 1947 and 1957. The house was renamed Greathed Manor when the widowed Pauline Spender-Clay built a smaller house in the grounds of the original building and requested that the new house be called Ford Manor. The original building was then leased by the Country Houses Association (CHA), which renamed the house after their Founder, Admiral Greathed. In 2008, following the collapse of the CHA, Greathed Manor was converted to a private nursing home, and is currently operated by Pressbeau Ltd.

== Architecture ==
Kerr was an influential mid-Victorian architect who wrote The Gentleman's House - Or, How To Plan English Residences, From The Parsonage To The Palace, published in 1864. Kerr's influence was greater than his talent; the architectural critic Ian Nairn described Greathed as; "over-confident, making no concessions to the landscape or anything else, without any (...) artistic sincerity, an extreme example of a justly neglected type". The architectural historian Mark Girouard was no more complimentary, describing the house as "appalling" and Kerr's most significant work, Bearwood House, as of a "design [...] as heavyweight as (its) technology".

The manor is of stone, and mainly of three stories. Until renovations in 1912, the building had a large porte-cochère at the front, and a winter garden at the rear.
