= Country Houses Association =

British charity

The Country Houses Association (CHA) was a British charity (a friendly society with charitable status) that converted country houses into retirement flats and maintained them from 1955 until its liquidation in 2004.

== History ==
The Country Houses Association Ltd. was an Industrial and Provident Society formed in 1955 by Rear Admiral Greathed, originally called the Mutual Households Association (MHA). Its stated aim was to preserve historic buildings for the benefit of the nation where those buildings were too large to support single household accommodation. During its lifetime, the association acquired nine large country houses, and restored and preserved them until their sale in 2002–4. During their ownership by the CHA, all the houses were converted into retirement apartments, with communal dining and drawing rooms, with the rental income helping to pay for the houses' extensive renovations and repairs (residents also paid deposits of up to £140,000). The houses were open to members of the association and also members of the public. Sir John Adye was the chair of the CHA from 1996 until 2002.

The association went into liquidation in December 2003, blaming falling demand for its apartments, the increasing age-profile of residents and the increased regulation surrounding the business. The trustees were told they could not use charity funds to support loss-making businesses with no future prospects.

At the time of its liquidation in 2003, the CHA owned eight houses:

- Albury Park, Albury, Surrey – purchased in 1969, sold in 2004 for £4.5m to Jennifer & Nigel Whalley (slowly being converted and sold as apartments when residents leave).
- Aynhoe Park, Aynhoe, Northamptonshire – purchased in 1959 (CHA's second house), sold in 2004 to James Perkins, who used part of the property as a family home and part for a series of commercial uses. Perkins sold the property to Restoration Hardware in 2020.
- Danny House, Hassocks, West Sussex – purchased in 1956 (CHA's first house), sold in 2004 for £3m to Rachael & Richard Burrows, who maintained it as serviced apartments for retired people and as a family business.
- Flete House, Holbeton, Devon – leased/purchased in 1961, sold in April 2004 to Raven Audley Court (Audley Retirement).
- Gosfield Hall, Braintree, Essex – purchased in December 1959, sold in early 2004 to investors and again in December 2004 to Country House Weddings Ltd.
- Great Maytham Hall, Rolvenden, Kent – purchased in 1965, sold in 2004 to Sunley Heritage, now private apartments.
- Pythouse, Tisbury, Wiltshire – purchased in about 1959, sold in 2004 for £7m and remains a residential home.
- Swallowfield Park, Swallowfield, Berkshire – purchased about 1975, sold in 2004 to Sunley Heritage, now private apartments.

A ninth house, Greathed Manor near Dormansland in Surrey (originally called Ford Manor when designed by Robert Kerr, but changed in 1960 to Greathed Manor by the CHA in memory of its founder), had its long lease (commencing in 1959 from the Nichols family, descendants of the Spender-Clay family) sold in about 2002, at the beginning of the association's financial troubles. In 2008 it was adapted into a nursing home. There was apparently also a tenth house run by the CHA, which might have been Otterden Place, Otterden, Faversham, Kent.

About six of the eight houses were sold as "going concerns", so that most of the 180 residents could remain in their apartments. Out of the original nine houses, seven are still in use as retirement or nursing homes, with Aynhoe Park and Gosfield Hall run as wedding and events venues.

== Successor organisations ==
Following the sale of the houses and the restructuring of the CHA in 2004, the Country Houses Foundation (CHF) was set up in 2005, and endowed with the surplus funds from the sale of the properties, which came to approximately £15 million. It is a charitable grant-giving foundation which supports the preservation of historic houses and gardens, with its Chairman currently being Norman Hudson.

In 2019, the Country Houses Foundation absorbed the Heritage Conservation Trust and changed its name to the Historic Houses Foundation. It began to offer grants to restore and repair works of art, in addition to historic houses and gardens.
