= List of people from Newport, Rhode Island =

The following list includes notable people who were born or have lived in Newport, Rhode Island.

== Notable people born in Newport ==
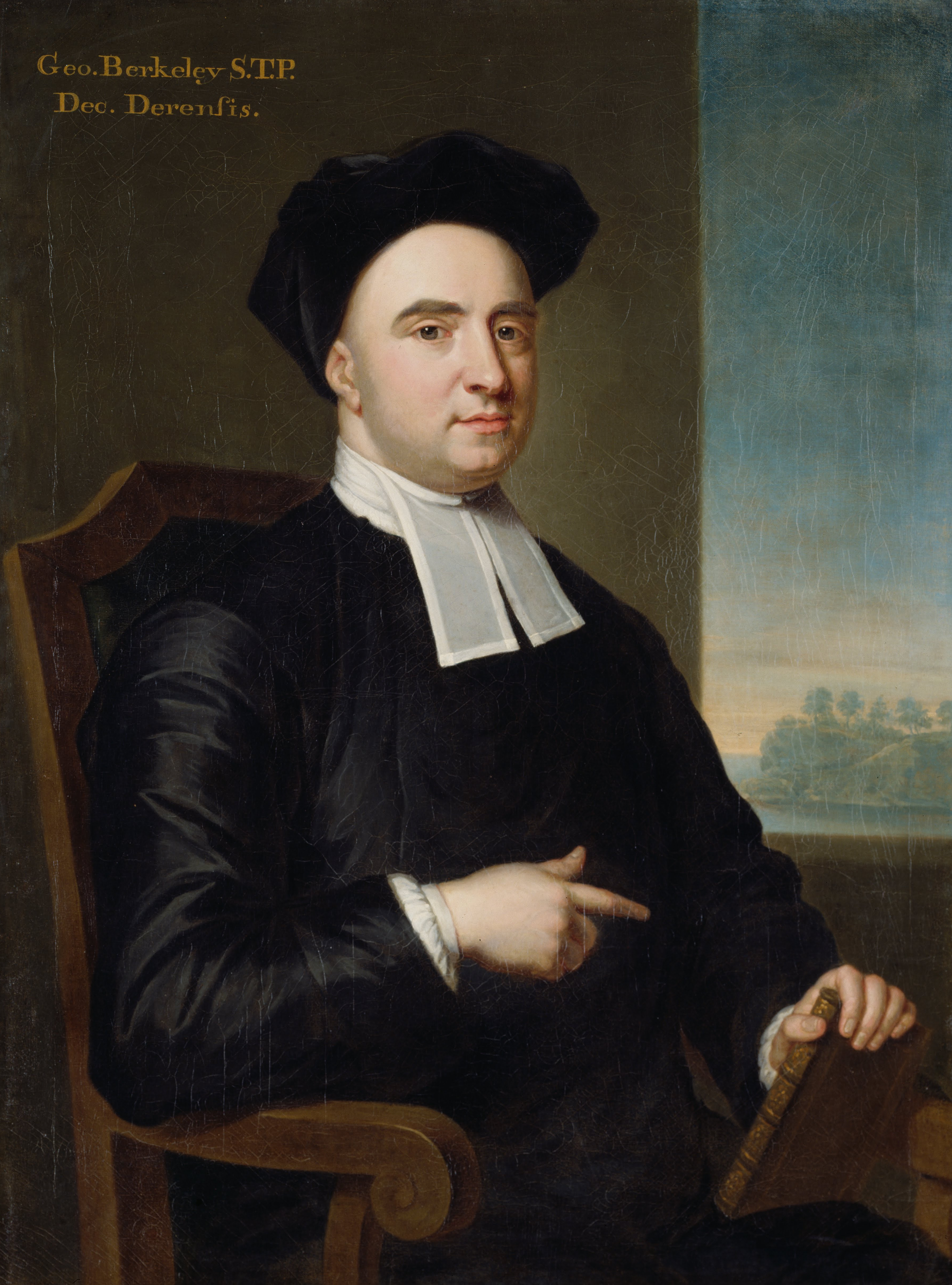
Philosopher Bishop Berkeley resided in Newport.

=== 18th century ===
- Vice-Admiral Sir Jahleel Brenton, Royal Navy
- William Ellery Channing, one of the foremost Unitarian preachers
- Caleb Gardner, captain and consul of French Empire
- Edward Malbone, artist and miniaturist
- David Olyphant, China merchant and member of American Board of Commissioners for Foreign Missions
- Christopher Raymond Perry, naval officer in American Revolution
- Solomon Southwick, publisher of Newport Mercury and advocate for Patriot cause in American Revolution
- Abigail Stoneman, widow and businesswoman

=== 19th century ===
- D. Putnam Brinley, artist
- George S. Brown, minister
- Clarence G. Child, scholar
- William Ennis, U.S. Army brigadier general
- Thomas Harper Ince, actor
- Clarence R. King, geologist, mountaineer, and first director of the U.S. Geological Survey (1879–1881); noted for exploration of Sierra Nevada
- Ida Lewis, lighthouse keeper credited with saving 18 lives in Newport Harbor; received national attention and numerous honors; a Coast Guard buoy tender bears her name
- David Melville, credited with first gas street lighting in the United States
- Matthew C. Perry, Navy commodore who opened Japan to the West with the Convention of Kanagawa in 1854, under the threat of military force
- Cornelia Bryce Pinchot, native of Newport who became a conservationist, Progressive politician, women’s rights activist, and First Lady of Pennsylvania
- Cynthia Taggart, poet
- Charles C. Van Zandt, 34th governor of Rhode Island

=== 20th century ===
- Harry Anderson, actor and comedian (Night Court)
- Margaret Frances Andrews, socialite and show dog breeder
- Lillian Barrett, novelist and playwright (also lived and died in Newport)
- Allen Bestwick, NASCAR and IndyCar Series announcer
- Nadia Bjorlin, soap opera actress (Days of Our Lives)
- Frank Corridon, pitcher for Chicago Cubs, Philadelphia Phillies, and St. Louis Cardinals; invented now-illegal pitch, the spitball
- Tanya Donelly, musician; vocalist for Rhode Island–based bands Belly and Throwing Muses; guitarist for the band The Breeders
- Charlie Fern, White House speechwriter, journalist
- Van Johnson, actor, known best for "all-American" roles in MGM films during World War II
- Lawson Little, 1940 U.S. Open golf champion
- Lillian Richter, lithographer
- Mena Suvari, actress, known for role in 1999 film American Beauty
- Elliott Thompson, artist
- Leon Wilkeson, bass guitarist

== Notable people who lived or worked in Newport ==
=== 17th century ===
- Benedict Arnold, governor of Rhode Island
- John Clarke, Baptist minister and drafter of Royal Charter
- William Coddington, governor of Rhode Island
- Nicholas Easton, governor of Rhode Island
- George Gardiner, early settler of Rhode Island, early Newport resident

=== 18th century ===
- George Berkeley, philosopher
- Louis Alexandre Berthier, French army officer, later marshal of France and Napoleon's chief of staff
- William Ellery, signer of Declaration of Independence
- Robert Feke, portrait painter
- Peter Harrison, architect
- Samuel Hopkins, Congregational minister, Calvinist theologian, leader for abolition of slave trade
- Aaron Lopez, merchant
- Louis-Marie, vicomte de Noailles, French army officer
- Charles Theodore Pachelbel, first organist of Newport's Trinity Church; son of Johann Pachelbel
- Jean-Baptiste Donatien de Vimeur, comte de Rochambeau, French general
- William Selby, organist at Trinity Church, composer
- John Smybert, artist
- Ezra Stiles, minister, diarist, and president of Yale
- Gilbert Stuart, portrait painter
- Isaac Touro, hazzan at synagogue
- Judah Touro, merchant and philanthropist

=== 19th century to 1885 ===
- George Bancroft, historian, secretary of the Navy, diplomat, and summer resident
- August Belmont, financier
- Ambrose Burnside, Army officer stationed at Fort Adams, later Civil War general, governor, senator
- Julia Ward Howe, author and summer resident
- Henry James, author
- William James, philosopher and Harvard professor
- John Kensett, artist
- Clement C. Moore, summer resident and author of "'Twas the Night before Christmas"
- Levi P. Morton, summer resident and donor of Morton Park, later vice president of the United States
- Commodore Oliver Hazard Perry, hero of War of 1812
- William Trost Richards, artist
- Milton H. Sanford, textile magnate and thoroughbred racehorse owner
- Judah Touro, philanthropist
- Richard Upjohn, architect
- Mahlon Van Horne, politician

=== The Gilded Age, 1885–1914 ===
- Caroline Webster Schermerhorn Astor, socialite
- Charles D. Barney, socialite, banker, founder of Smith Barney Brokerage
- Alva Belmont, socialite and leader of women's rights movement
- August Belmont, financier
- Oliver Hazard Perry Belmont, socialite, builder of Belcourt Castle
- James Gordon Bennett, Jr., newspaper publisher and yachtsman
- Ogden Codman, designer
- Richard Morris Hunt, architect
- William Morris Hunt, artist
- John LaFarge, artist
- Pierre Lorillard, tobacco manufacturer
- Rear Admiral Stephen B. Luce, founder of Naval War College
- Captain Alfred Thayer Mahan, naval historian and strategist
- Ward McAllister, flamboyant raconteur of high society, coined the term "the 400" for the New York social elite
- Charles McKim, architect
- Edith B. Price, writer and illustrator
- H.H. Richardson, architect
- Horace Trumbauer, architect
- James J. Van Alen, summer resident and ambassador to Italy
- Alva Vanderbilt, wife of William K. Vanderbilt; early feminist, active in women's suffrage movement
- Consuelo Vanderbilt, daughter of W.K. and Alva Vanderbilt; duchess of Marlborough
- Cornelius Vanderbilt II, heir to Vanderbilt fortune, chairman of New York Central Railroad
- Frederick Vanderbilt, heir to Vanderbilt fortune, philanthropist
- William Kissam Vanderbilt, heir to Vanderbilt fortune, yachtsman
- Edith Wharton, author
- Stanford White, architect
- Thornton Wilder, author, playwright; his 1973 novel Theophilus North is set in Newport; served briefly in Army's Coast Artillery Corps at Fort Adams in World War I

=== 20th century, 1914–2000 ===
- John Jacob Astor VI, socialite, heir to Astor family fortune, summer resident
- Ellen Bird, British-born woman, personal maid of Ida Straus on the Titanic
- Admiral Jeremy Michael Boorda, 25th chief of Naval Operations
- John Nicholas Brown, socialite, yachtsman and philanthropist
- Charlie Day, actor
- Doris Duke, tobacco heiress and philanthropist
- Joanna Going, actress, Another World, House of Cards
- Paul Gordon, musician with Goo Goo Dolls, New Radicals, The B-52's
- Kristin Hersh, musician, vocalist for Rhode Island–based band Throwing Muses, 50 Foot Wave; solo artist
- Antony Kloman, painter
- Jane Pickens Langley, singer, entertainer and philanthropist
- Elaine Lorillard, summer resident, founder of Newport Jazz Festival
- Perle Mesta, socialite, political hostess and U.S. ambassador to Luxembourg
- MacGillivray Milne, 27th governor of American Samoa, 1936–1938
- Diane Nelson, president of DC Entertainment
- Fleet Admiral Chester Nimitz, commander, U.S. Pacific Fleet, 1942–1945; chief of Naval Operations
- Jacqueline Kennedy Onassis, First Lady of the United States, summer resident
- Claiborne Pell, socialite and U.S. senator 1961–1997
- Alfredo Sciarrotta, silversmith and undersea weapons expert
- Admiral William Sims, commander of U.S. Naval Forces in Europe, 1917–1919
- Admiral Raymond Spruance, the victor of Midway; president, Naval War College
- Jimmy Van Alen, summer resident and founder of International Tennis Hall of Fame
- Margaret Van Alen Bruguiere, socialite, art collector; niece of Frederick Vanderbilt
- Harold Vanderbilt, yachtsman, bridge player, inventor of contract bridge
- Martha Sharp Crawford (Sunny) von Bülow, socialite, heiress (resided with husband Claus von Bülow at Clarendon Court on Bellevue Avenue)

=== 21st century, 2001– ===
- Ken Barlow, TV meteorologist, 1987–
- Richard Hatch, first winner of the reality television show Survivor
- Sheldon Whitehouse, U.S. senator, 2007–
- Dede Wilsey, San Franciscan socialite, summer resident and philanthropist
- Richard Saul Wurman, architect, graphic designer, founder of the TED Conference
