= John Delane =

John Delane may refer to:

- John Thadeus Delane, editor of The Times (London)
- John Edward Delane, American racing driver and businessman
