= John Jacob Astor III =

Union Army officer, capitalist, philanthropist (1822–1890)

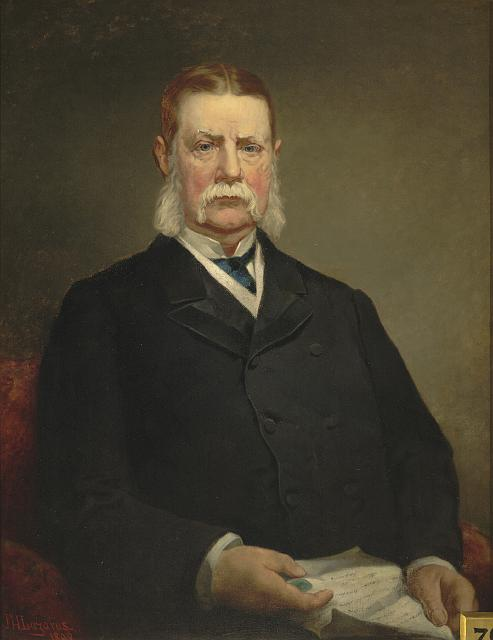
- Portrait of Astor by Jacob Hart Lazarus, 1890
- Born: June 10, 1822; New York City, New York, U.S.
- Died: February 22, 1890 (aged 67); New York City, New York, U.S.
- Burial place: Trinity Church Cemetery, New York City, New York
- Education: Columbia College; University of Göttingen; Harvard University
- Occupations: Financier, philanthropist
- Spouse: Charlotte Augusta Gibbes (m. 1846; died 1887)
- Children: William Waldorf Astor
- Parent(s): William Backhouse Astor Sr. Margaret Alida Rebecca Armstrong
- Relatives: See Astor family
- Military Service
- Allegiance: United States of America
- Branch: New York Militia; US Army
- Service years: 1850-53; 1861-62
- Rank: Lieutenant Colonel; Brigadier General
- Units: 12th New York State Militia; U.S. Volunteers (ADC to McClellan)
- Conflicts: American Civil War; Peninsula Campaign
- Awards: MOLLUS

Signature
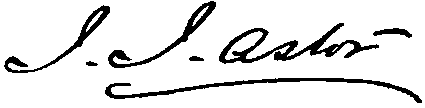

Arms of Astor family.

John Jacob Astor III (Note: Some sources such as Time magazine incorrectly list him as "John Jacob Astor II" and discount the birth of his uncle John Jacob Astor Jr., who was unstable.) (June 10, 1822 – February 22, 1890) was an American financier, philanthropist and a soldier during the American Civil War. He was a prominent member of the Astor family, becoming the wealthiest member in his generation.

== Early life and education ==
Astor was the eldest son of real estate businessman William Backhouse Astor Sr. and Margaret Alida Rebecca Armstrong. One of his younger brothers was businessman William Backhouse Astor Jr.

His paternal grandparents were merchant-trader John Jacob Astor, who made his first fortune in the North American fur trade, and Sarah Cox Todd. Astor's maternal grandparents were Senator John Armstrong Jr. and Alida Livingston of the Livingston family.

John Astor III studied at Columbia College, graduating in 1839, and the University of Göttingen, following which he went to Harvard Law School, graduating in 1842. He practiced law for a year, to qualify for assisting in the management of his family's immense estate, one half of which later descended to him.

== Career ==
In business, Astor dabbled in railroad investment, but was outsmarted by Commodore Cornelius Vanderbilt and forced to yield control of the original New York Central Railroad line (from Albany to Buffalo) to him. His principal business interest was the vast Astor Estate real estate holdings in New York City, which he managed profitably and parsimoniously.

=== Military service ===
Astor was elected lieutenant colonel of the 12th Regiment of the New York Militia. He resigned from the office in 1853.

During the American Civil War, Astor served as a volunteer aide-de-camp, with the rank of colonel, to Major General George B. McClellan (then commanding general of the U.S. Army) from November 30, 1861, to July 11, 1862. In recognition of his services during the Peninsular Campaign, Astor was brevetted as a brigadier general of Volunteers in March 1865.

In 1880, Astor became a companion of the New York Commandery of the Military Order of the Loyal Legion of the United States—a military society of officers who had served in the Union armed forces. He was assigned insignia number 1909.

He regarded his Civil War service as the best of his life and attended the reunions of the Loyal Legion with zeal.

=== Philanthropy ===
Astor donated objects and funds to the Metropolitan Museum of Art (in 1887, he presented it with his wife's collection of valuable laces and left a bequest of $50,000). He and his brother presented Trinity Church in lower Manhattan with a memorial to their father: a sculptured reredos and altar costing $80,000. He left a bequest of $450,000 to the Astor Library, bringing the family benefactions to the institution to a total of about $1,500,000. He also gave generously to the New York Cancer Hospital ($100,000 bequest), New York City's Women's Hospital, New York City's St. Luke's Hospital ($100,000 bequest) and the Children's Aid Society.

He took an active interest in the Astor Library beyond funding. He was treasurer of its board of trustees, and in 1879 deeded to it the three lots on which the northern wing of the present building was later constructed by him. He presented it with his collection of early books and rare manuscripts.

His deeply religious wife, Charlotte, supported the newly formed Children's Aid Society and sat on the board of Women's Hospital, an institution that to her dismay refused to accept cancer patients. She persuaded her husband to donate the money ($225,000) to erect the New York Cancer Hospital's first wing, the "Astor Pavilion". For twenty years, she supported a German industrial school. From 1872 until her death, she was a manager of the Women's Hospital, besides taking an active part in the Niobrara League to aid the Indians and in many other charities. She bequeathed $150,000 to charitable organizations.

== Personal life ==
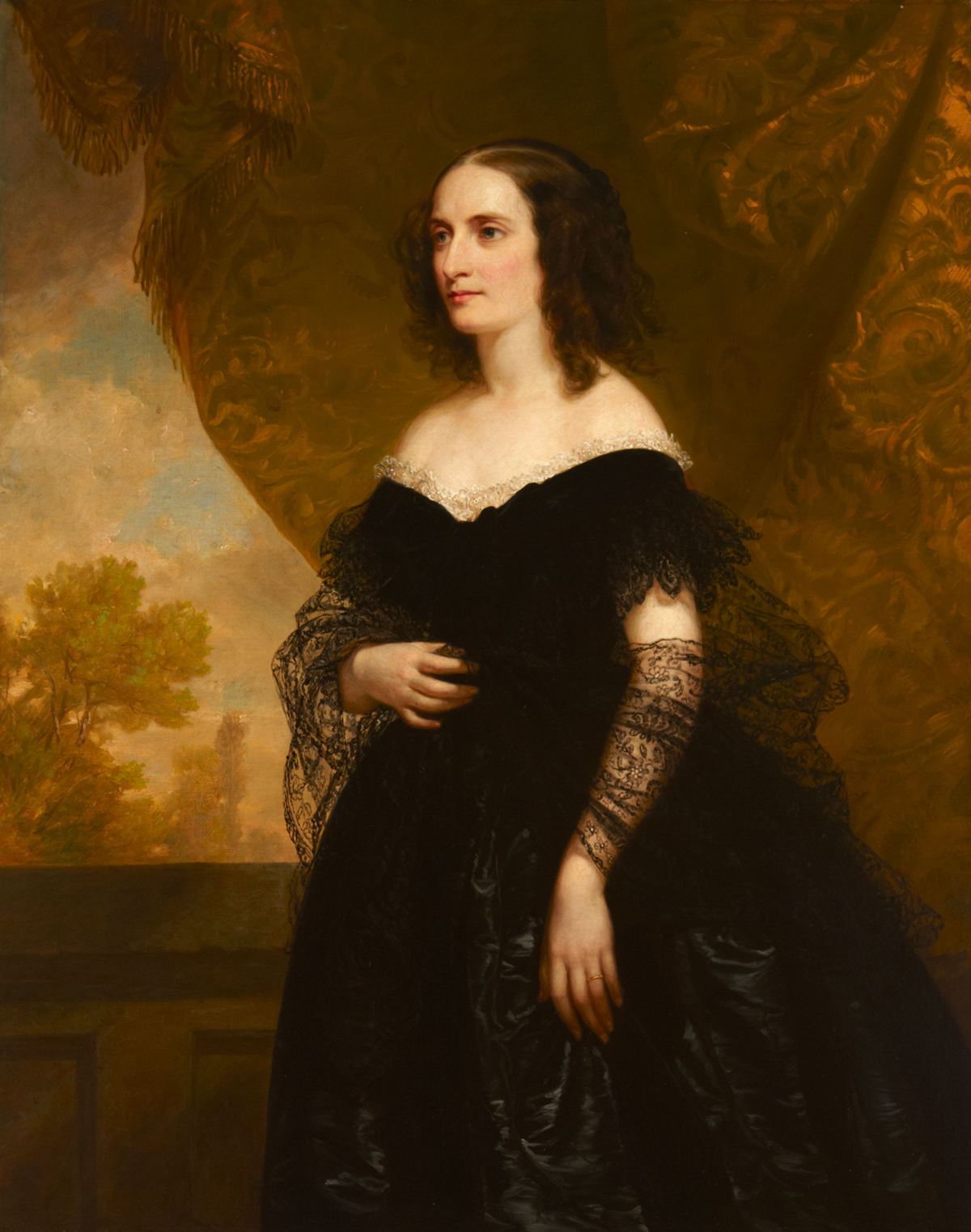
Charlotte Augusta Gibbes, portrait by Thomas Sully

On December 9, 1846, Astor was married at Trinity Church in New York City to Charlotte Augusta Gibbes (February 27, 1825 – December 12, 1887). Her parents were Thomas Stanyarne Gibbes Jr. and Susan Annette Vanden Heuvel. She was a descendant of Charles Apthorp, Jan Cornelius Van den Heuvel, and South Carolina Governor Robert Gibbes. Together, they had one child, William Waldorf Astor in 1848, who later became the 1st Viscount Astor and married Mary Dahlgren Paul.

In 1859, he built a home at 338 Fifth Avenue, today the street address of the Empire State Building. Later, he had an imposing vacation home, Beaulieu, built in Newport, Rhode Island, and he had a country estate, Nuits, at Ardsley-on-Hudson in Irvington, New York. Astor increasingly visited London in his later years. His son moved there permanently with his family in 1891 and became a British citizen in 1899, later being made Lord Astor.

John Jacob Astor III died on February 22, 1890, and was interred in the Trinity Church Cemetery in Manhattan.

== See also ==
- List of Columbia College people
- List of Harvard Law School alumni
- List of people from New York City
- List of people from Newport, Rhode Island
- List of philanthropists
- List of University of Göttingen people
