= Ascot Heath House =

Former English country house in Berkshire

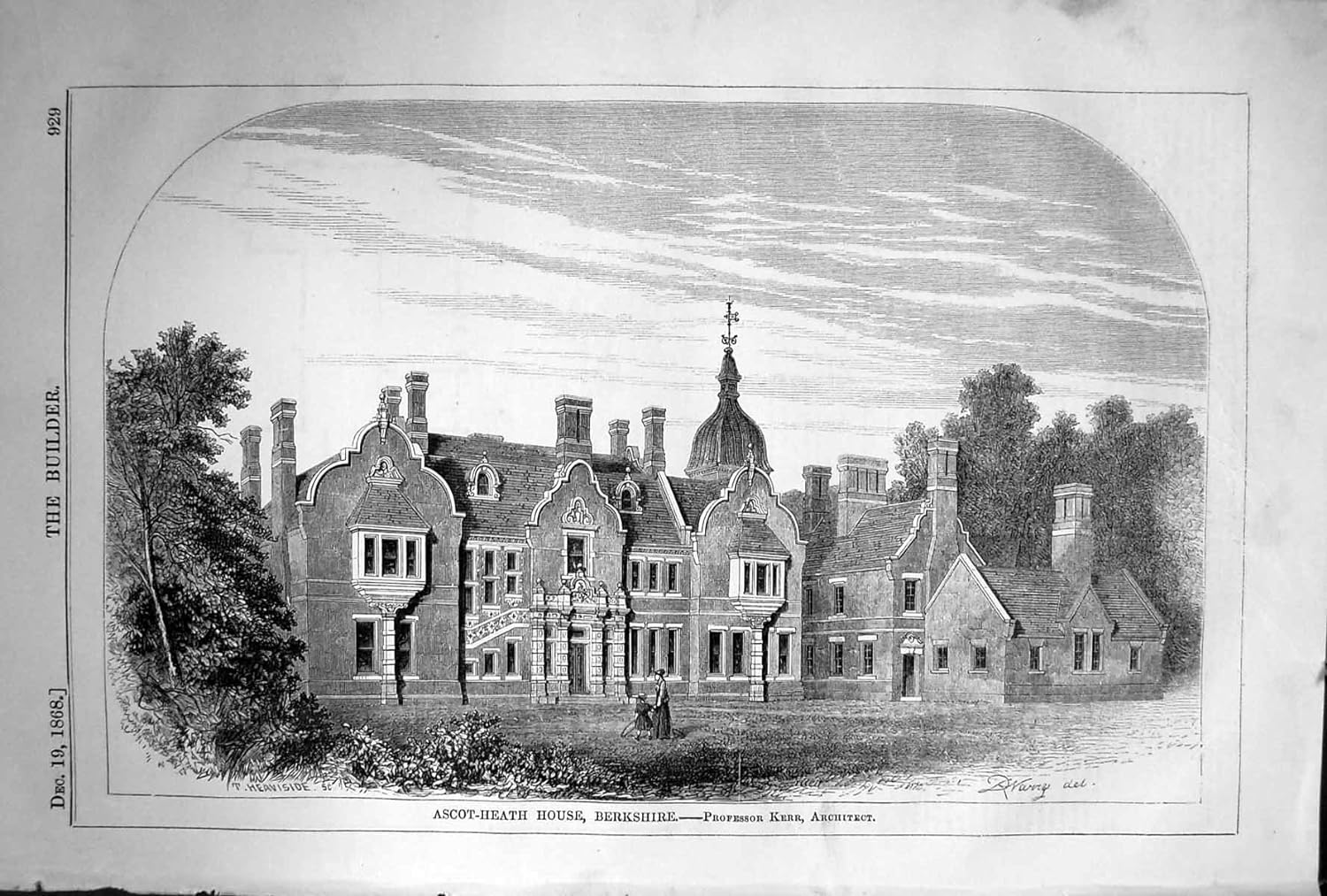
- Entrance Front of Ascot Heath House, 1868

- Location within Berkshire Location within England
- 51°24′36″N 0°40′57″W
- Type: Country House
- Location: Ascot, Berkshire, England
- OS grid reference: SU 917 687

History
- Built: 1868
- Built for: John Thadeus Delane
- Demolished: Yes

Site notes
- Architect: Robert Kerr
- Architectural style: Jacobethan
- Restored: 1891

Ascot Heath House was an English country house. The house was located directly across the road from the grandstand at Ascot Racecourse in Ascot, Berkshire and played an important role in activities at the racecourse during the late 19th and early 20th century.

== History ==
The property was given to Richard Cobden by an admirer of his free trade views. Cobden then sold it to John Thadeus Delane in 1858. Delane was the editor of The Times (London) from 1840 to 1877. There was a house on the property, but in 1868 Delane replaced it with a new design by Robert Kerr. In the 1860s and 1870s Delane often entertained nobility while they attended the races. Edward VII, at that time the Prince of Wales, was a frequent guest. Delane died at the house on 22 November 1879.

After this, the property passed through various hands, all in some way related to horse racing. The Jockey Club used it as a clubhouse. George Coventry, 9th Earl of Coventry, the Master of the Buckhounds from 1886 to 1892 and from 1895 to 1900, owned the property and renovated it in 1891. In 1899 he had a subway constructed under the main road so that honored visitors could move directly between Ascot Heath House and the Royal Enclosure at the racecourse.

When the title of Master of the Buckhounds was abolished by the Civil List Act 1901, a new title, His Majesty's Representative at Ascot, was created to manage admittance to the Royal Enclosure at the Ascot Racecourse. The first holder, Victor Spencer, 1st Viscount Churchill, purchased the house and made many improvements. For example, a paved footpath was created across the gardens of the house, which happened to be located directly between the Ascot railway station and the racecourse. In 1905 the trustees of the racecourse and the London and South Western Railway built a roof over the entire footpath from the station to the subway. Spencer auctioned the property in 1914.

== Architecture ==
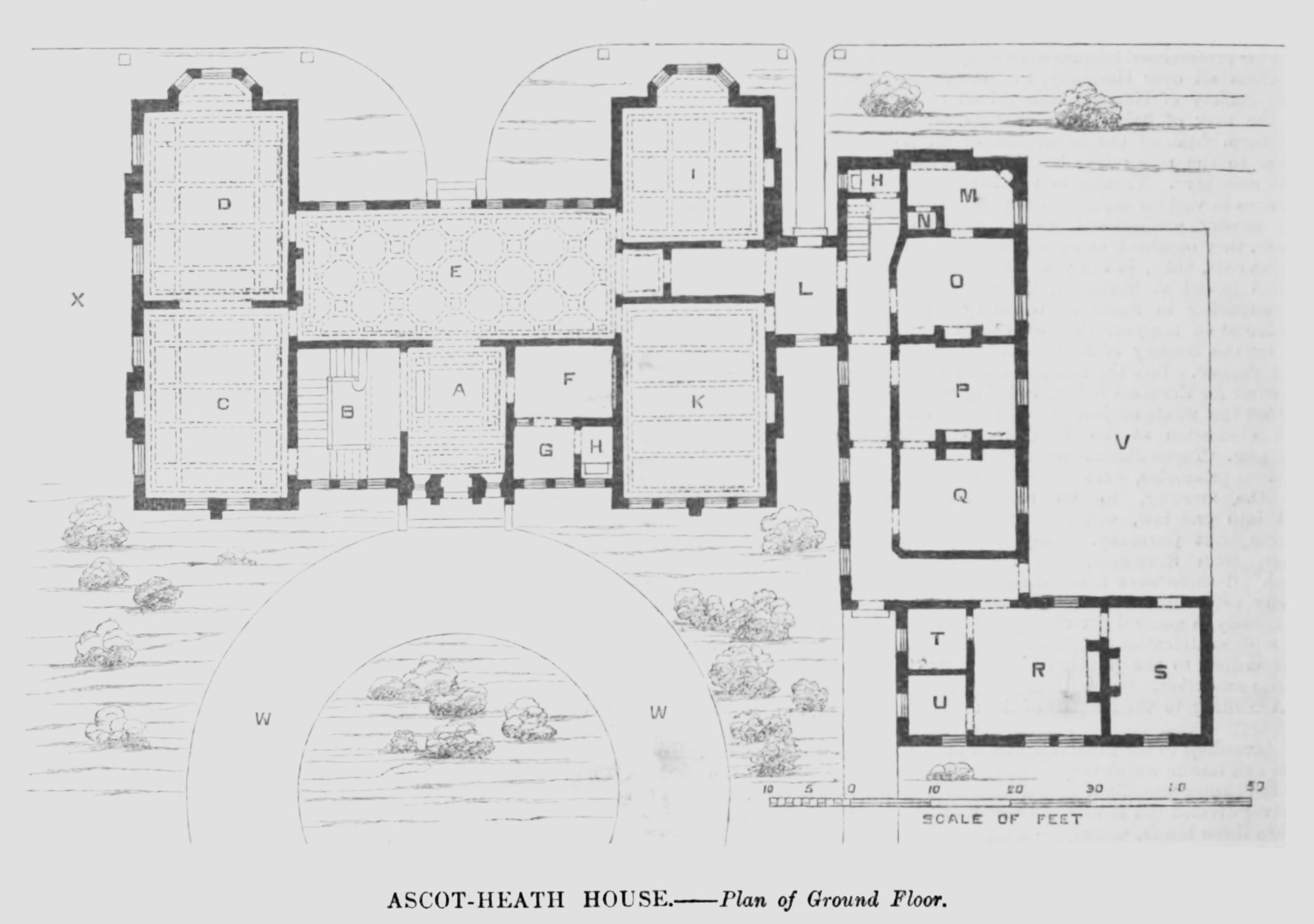
Ground floor plan of Ascot Heath House, 1868

The house was constructed in the Jacobean Revival style popular at the time. The architect, Robert Kerr, had recently completed the designs for nearby Bearwood House, a much larger and more ambitious project in the same style. The exterior was red brick with Bath stone details and white brick courses. The interior had paneled ceilings and was of a "simple, comfortable character, without display."

The most notable aspects of the interior design were the location of the stairway, separate and to the side of the entrance hall, and the position of the house's public rooms (Morning, Drawing, Library, and Dining) at the ends of the 12 by 5 metre gallery, allowing all this space to be used simultaneously for the rather extensive entertaining that was done at the house during the Royal Ascot meeting and other racecourse events.
