= Charlotte Augusta Gibbes =

American philanthropist (1825–1887)

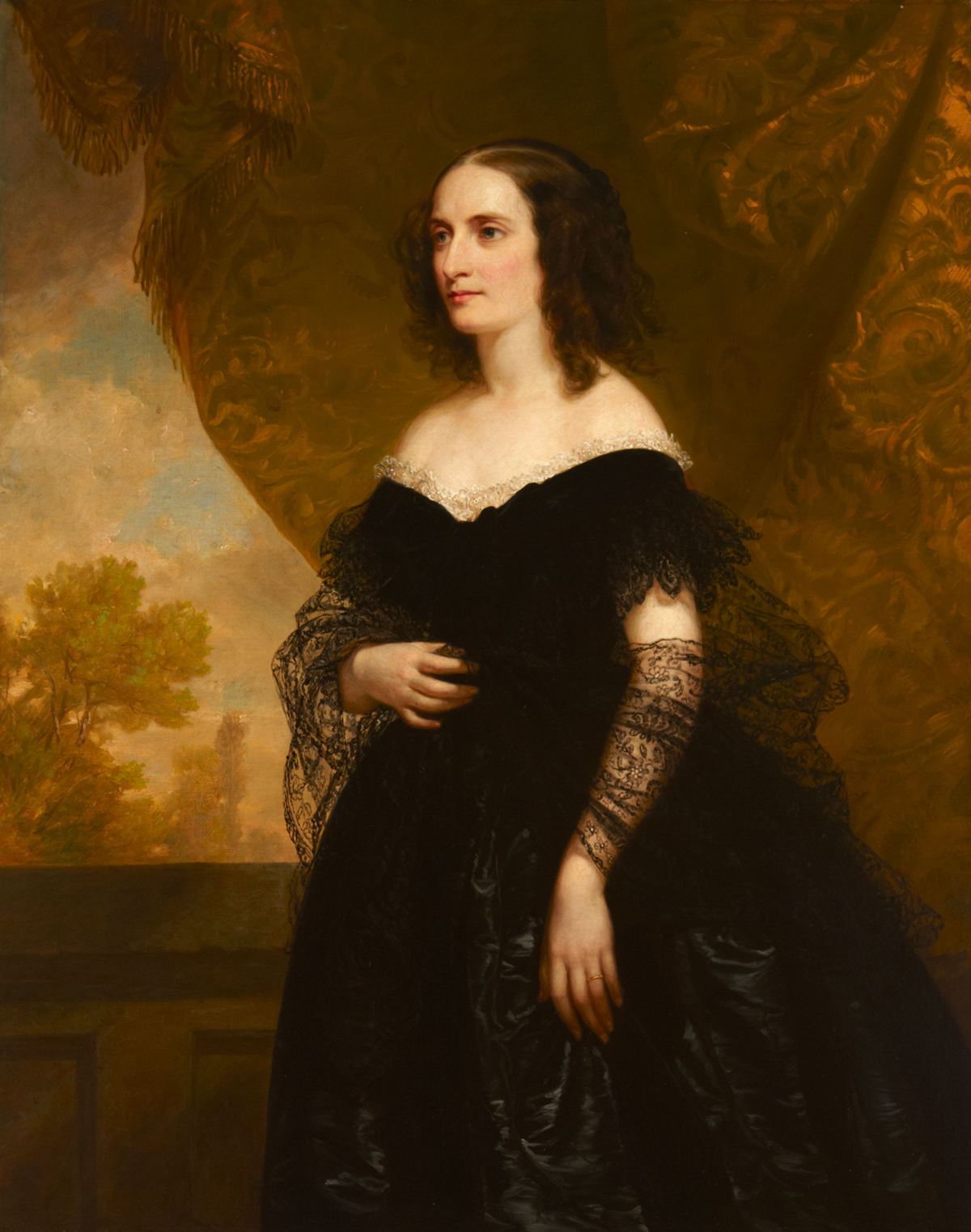
- Portrait by Thomas Sully, c. 1860. Now at Cliveden, National Trust.
- Born: February 27, 1825; Charleston, South Carolina
- Died: December 12, 1887 (aged 62); Manhattan, New York
- Resting place: Trinity Church Cemetery, New York
- Known for: Co-founder, New York Cancer Hospital (now Memorial Sloan Kettering)
- Spouse: John Jacob Astor III (m. 1846)
- Children: William Waldorf Astor, 1st Viscount Astor
- Parent(s): Thomas Ellis Gibbes; Susan Annette Van den Heuvel
- Relatives: Robert Gibbes (great-great-great-grandfather); Baron Jan Cornelis van den Heuvel (maternal grandfather); John Church Hamilton (uncle by marriage); Nancy Astor (granddaughter-in-law); Queen Camilla (great-great-great-grandson’s mother-in-law)
- Family: Gibbes family (paternal); Hamilton family (maternal); Astor family (by marriage)

Charlotte Augusta Gibbes (February 27, 1825 – December 12, 1887) was an American philanthropist and co-founder of the New York Cancer Hospital, the first hospital in the United States dedicated exclusively to the treatment of cancer. She personally funded $225,000 (equivalent to approximately $7.5 million in 2024) for the hospital’s first wing. The institution opened on December 7, 1887. Charlotte died of uterine cancer five days later. She never entered the building she built. The hospital later became Memorial Sloan Kettering Cancer Center, the world’s oldest and largest private cancer center.

Charlotte was the wife of John Jacob Astor III and the mother of William Waldorf Astor, 1st Viscount Astor. Born in Charleston, South Carolina, she descended from Robert Gibbes (1644–1715), Governor of the Province of Carolina, and was connected through marriage to three of the four South Carolina signers of the Declaration of Independence. Through her maternal family, she was a first cousin of Alexander Hamilton’s grandchildren. Her 1846 marriage to Astor united one of the oldest colonial families in the American South with the largest fortune in the American North and produced a dynasty that extended into the British peerage, the House of Commons, and the British Royal Family.

== Early life ==
Charlotte was born on February 27, 1825, in Charleston, South Carolina, the daughter of Thomas Ellis Gibbes, a descendant of colonial Governor Robert Gibbes, and Susan Annette Van den Heuvel. Her maternal heritage was rooted in Dutch colonial New York.

Charlotte’s maternal grandfather, Baron Jan Cornelis van den Heuvel (1742–1826), was a Dutch-born plantation owner and politician who served as governor of the Dutch colony of Demerara (now part of Guyana) from 1765 to 1770 and later became a merchant in New York City with the Dutch West India Company. After arriving in New York in 1790, he purchased 400 acres in the Bloomingdale district of upper Manhattan and established a city residence at the corner of Broadway and Barclay Street, the present site of the Woolworth Building. He was elected a director of the U.S. Branch Bank in 1801.

Through Van den Heuvel’s daughters, Charlotte was connected to several prominent American families. Her maternal aunt Maria Eliza Van den Heuvel married John Church Hamilton (son and biographer of Alexander Hamilton), making Charlotte a first cousin of Hamilton’s grandchildren, including Civil War generals Alexander Hamilton and Schuyler Hamilton. Another aunt, Margaret Van den Heuvel, married Ralph Isaacs Ingersoll, U.S. representative from Connecticut and Minister to Russia under President James K. Polk; their son Charles Roberts Ingersoll served as Governor of Connecticut from 1873 to 1877, and their son Colin Macrae Ingersoll served as a U.S. Congressman.

On December 9, 1846, Charlotte married John Jacob Astor III (1822–1890) at Trinity Church in Manhattan. Astor was the grandson of John Jacob Astor, who at his death in 1848 was the wealthiest person in the United States. Their only child, William Waldorf Astor, was born in 1848.

== Civil War ==
During the Civil War, Charlotte broke with her Southern heritage, actively encouraging the recruiting of a regiment of Black troops for the Union Army. Her husband served as aide-de-camp to Major General George B. McClellan and was brevetted a brigadier general for service during the Peninsular Campaign.

== Founding of the New York Cancer Hospital ==
In the 1880s, cancer was widely considered incurable, contagious, and shameful. Hospitals routinely refused to admit cancer patients. J. Marion Sims, founder of the Woman’s Hospital of New York, had resigned in protest over the exclusion.

The idea for a dedicated cancer hospital originated with Elizabeth Hamilton Cullum (1831–1884), Charlotte’s first cousin and the granddaughter of Alexander Hamilton through his son John Church Hamilton. Cullum was the widow of Henry Halleck, General-in-Chief of all U.S. Armies under Lincoln (1862–1864), and the wife of Major General George Washington Cullum, Superintendent of West Point. After losing her only son to cancer in 1882 and being diagnosed herself in 1883, Cullum assembled a circle of New York’s most powerful philanthropists. Charlotte and John Jacob Astor III became the project’s principal benefactors after the Woman’s Hospital refused Astor’s offer to fund a cancer pavilion within its walls. Joining them were John E. Parsons, the foremost corporate lawyer in Gilded Age New York and chief counsel to the Sugar Trust, who served as the hospital’s first president from 1884 to 1915; and Joseph William Drexel, partner at Drexel, Morgan & Co. (the predecessor of JPMorgan Chase), brother of Anthony Drexel (J. P. Morgan’s mentor and senior partner), and uncle of Saint Katharine Drexel.

On May 31, 1884, the group laid the cornerstone for the New York Cancer Hospital at 455 Central Park West. It was the first hospital in the United States dedicated exclusively to cancer, and only the second in the world after the London Cancer Hospital.

Charlotte personally funded $225,000 for the first wing, designated the “Astor Pavilion,” devoted solely to the treatment of women. The building was designed by Charles Coolidge Haight modeled on the chateaux of the Loire Valley, with distinctive circular wards designed to eliminate corners where physicians believed germs could accumulate.

The hospital received its first patients on December 7, 1887. Charlotte died five days later, on December 12, of uterine cancer. She was sixty-two years old. She had not entered the hospital she built. Two of the institution’s principal female founders were killed by the disease it was created to treat.

In 1893, the hospital appointed William B. Coley, who developed an early form of immunotherapy, earning him the title “Father of Immunotherapy.” In 1921, Marie Curie visited the hospital to inspect its four grams of radium. The institution merged in 1960 with the Sloan Kettering Institute to become Memorial Sloan Kettering Cancer Center.

== Death and legacy ==
Charlotte died on December 12, 1887. She was buried at Trinity Church Cemetery in Hamilton Heights, Manhattan. She bequeathed $150,000 to charitable organizations. The hospital she established grew into the world’s preeminent cancer center. The building she commissioned is a designated New York City landmark (1976) and listed on the National Register of Historic Places (1977). Charlotte Augusta Gibbes’s name appears on neither.

A portrait of Charlotte by Thomas Sully, c. 1860, hangs at Cliveden, catalogued by Art UK. An 1860 photograph attributed to Mathew Brady’s studio is held by the Museum of the City of New York.

== Gibbes and Gibbs family ==
=== Robert Gibbes and the founding of Charleston ===
Charlotte’s great-great-great-grandfather, Robert Gibbes (January 9, 1644 – June 24, 1715), was born in Sandwich, Kent, England, and was a prominent Landgrave and one of the first settlers of Charles Town (now Charleston) in 1670. He held multiple key positions in the colonial administration of South Carolina, including lieutenant colonel in the South Carolina militia, Sheriff of Carolina, member of the First Commons House of Assembly, Proprietor’s Deputy, member of the Grand Council, Chief Justice of South Carolina, and Governor of the Province of Carolina, whose charter territory encompassed all or parts of what are now seven U.S. states. He was the last Governor of the unified Province before its partition into North and South Carolina in 1712.

Charlotte’s extended family connected through marriage to three of the four South Carolina signers of the Declaration of Independence: Arthur Middleton, through Mary “Polly” Gibbes’s marriage to his brother Thomas; Thomas Heyward Jr., through Elizabeth Mathews; and Edward Rutledge, the youngest signer, through his marriage to Henrietta Middleton. All three were captured together during the Siege of Charleston in 1780 and imprisoned at St. Augustine, Florida.

Charlotte’s cousin James Shoolbred Gibbes (1819–1888) endowed the Gibbes Museum of Art at 135 Meeting Street, Charleston, which opened in 1905 and today houses more than 10,000 works of American art.

=== The New England Gibbs ===
The South Carolina branch descends from two sons of Stephen Gibbs (c. 1562–1594) of Saltwood Castle, Kent, who emigrated first to Barbados and then to Carolina. The American branch retained the older English spelling “Gibbes,” while the English side eventually modernized to “Gibbs.” Y-DNA analysis has identified a genetic haplogroup (I-M253) shared by living English Gibbs men with ancestry in Kent, with a partial match to a Gibbes descendant in North America.

The Warwickshire branch produced a parallel American dynasty. Robert Gibbs, fourth son of Sir Henry Gibbs of Honington Hall (granted by the Crown to the Gibbes family in 1540), emigrated to Boston around 1658, where he became a distinguished merchant. His son Henry graduated from Harvard College in 1685, establishing a family association with Harvard that persisted for generations; from the early colonial period through the early Republic, there was always a Henry Gibbs associated with the college. Henry Gibbs of Salem (1668–1723) served as Justice of the Peace, Judge, and Clerk of the Massachusetts House of Representatives; he is credited with preventing the spread of witchcraft persecutions to Watertown in 1692–93.

A later Henry Gibbs of Salem was the brother-in-law of Roger Sherman, the only person to sign all four great state papers of the United States: the Articles of Association (1774), the Declaration of Independence (1776), the Articles of Confederation (1778), and the Constitution (1787). Sherman’s letters to Gibbs, including five written from the first Congress between 1789 and 1790, survive in the Gibbs family papers at Yale.

The Gibbs of Rhode Island married into the Wolcott family of Connecticut: George Gibbs III (Yale College, class of 1800) married Laura Wolcott, daughter of Oliver Wolcott Jr., Secretary of the Treasury under John Adams and Governor of Connecticut, and granddaughter of Oliver Wolcott, signer of the Declaration of Independence and the Articles of Confederation. George Gibbs III assembled the largest private mineral collection in America, which Yale purchased in 1825, forming the foundation of its geological holdings; the mineral gibbsite was named for him.

His son Oliver Wolcott Gibbs (1822–1908) served as Rumford Professor of Chemistry at Harvard University from 1863 to 1887 and as president of the National Academy of Sciences from 1895 to 1900; he was nominated for the Nobel Prize in Chemistry in 1902, and Harvard built and named the Wolcott Gibbs Memorial Laboratory in his honor.

Josiah Willard Gibbs served as professor of sacred literature at Yale from 1826 to 1861 and is remembered for locating an interpreter for the African captives of the ‘’Amistad’’ in 1839, enabling their testimony during the trial. His son Josiah Willard Gibbs (1839–1903) served as professor of mathematical physics at Yale and is regarded as one of the founders of statistical mechanics and chemical thermodynamics. Through his mother Mary Anna Van Cleve, Josiah Willard Gibbs was a descendant of the Rev. Jonathan Dickinson, the first president of the College of New Jersey (later Princeton University).

The Honington Gibbs bore the same battle-axe arms and the motto ‘‘Tenax propositi’’ as the Carolina Gibbes, indicating common Norman origin.

== Descendants ==
All of Charlotte’s descendants flow through her only child, William Waldorf Astor (1848–1919), who constructed the original Waldorf Hotel, acquired Cliveden and Hever Castle (childhood home of Anne Boleyn), purchased ‘’The Pall Mall Gazette’’ and ‘’The Observer’’, and was created 1st Viscount Astor in 1916.

=== Parliament ===
William Waldorf’s elder son Waldorf, 2nd Viscount Astor, married Nancy Langhorne of Virginia. When Waldorf entered the House of Lords in 1919, Nancy stood for his seat and became the first woman to take her seat in the House of Commons, serving twenty-six years. Their grandson William Astor, 4th Viscount Astor, is an elected hereditary peer in the House of Lords; his stepdaughter is Samantha Cameron, wife of David Cameron, Prime Minister of the United Kingdom from 2010 to 2016 and Foreign Secretary from 2023 to 2024.

Another of Waldorf and Nancy’s sons, David Astor (1912–2001), was editor of ‘’The Observer’’ from 1948 to 1975, one of the most influential newspaper editors in twentieth-century Britain, an early opponent of apartheid, and a patron of George Orwell.

=== The Bowes-Lyon connection ===
Charlotte’s granddaughter Pauline Astor (1880–1972) married Herbert Spender-Clay, Conservative MP. Their daughter Rachel Spender-Clay married the Hon. David Bowes-Lyon (1902–1961), youngest brother of Queen Elizabeth The Queen Mother and uncle of Queen Elizabeth II. Their son Simon Bowes-Lyon (b. 1932) was a first cousin of the queen and served as Lord Lieutenant of Hertfordshire.

=== ‘‘The Times’’, Field Marshal Haig, and the House of Windsor ===
William Waldorf’s younger son John Jacob Astor V, 1st Baron Astor of Hever (1886–1971), served as chief proprietor of ‘’The Times’’ of London from 1922 to 1966, placing two of Britain’s most influential newspapers simultaneously in the hands of Charlotte Gibbes’s grandsons during much of the twentieth century. His wife, Lady Violet Elliot-Murray-Kynynmound, was the daughter of Gilbert Elliot-Murray-Kynynmound, 4th Earl of Minto, Governor General of Canada and Viceroy of India.

Their son Gavin Astor, 2nd Baron Astor of Hever (1918–1984) married Lady Irene Haig, youngest daughter of Field Marshal Douglas Haig, 1st Earl Haig, commander of the British Expeditionary Force on the Western Front. Gavin and Irene’s daughter Sarah Astor married George Lopes. Their son Harry Lopes (b. 1977), Charlotte’s great-great-great-grandson, married Laura Parker Bowles in 2006, the daughter of Queen Camilla and stepdaughter of King Charles III. Their daughter Eliza was a bridesmaid at the royal wedding in 2011. Their sons Gus and Louis served as Pages of Honour to Queen Camilla at the coronation of King Charles III in 2023.

== See also ==
- Roger Sherman
- Josiah Willard Gibbs
- Oliver Wolcott Gibbs
- Gibbes Museum of Art
- Astor family
- Cliveden
- Hever Castle
