= Wellingtonia Avenue =

Road in England

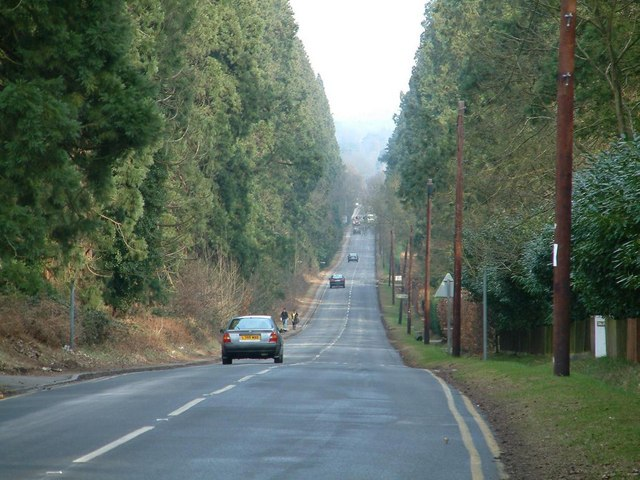

Route information
- Length: 1.1 km (0.68 mi)
- Existed: 1860s–present

Location
- Country: United Kingdom

Road network
- Roads in the United Kingdom; Motorways; A and B road zones

Wellingtonia Avenue is a road in Crowthorne, Berkshire, England. The road is lined with over one hundred giant sequoia trees, commonly known in the UK as Wellingtonia.

== History ==
The road was built in 1863 through woodland known as Finchampstead Ridges to the east of Finchampstead. The woodland is now managed by the National Trust. The road leads from the ridges in the west toward Wellington College in Crowthorne to the east. The road's construction was initiated by John Walter from Bearwood House, some 6.5 kilometres (4.0 mi) to the north-west.

The trees were planted in the early 1860s (most sources report around 1863 and 1865, though other sources state the planting began as early as 1859 or 1861 or as late as 1869) as a memorial to the Duke of Wellington, who had lived in the nearby Stratfield Saye estate. The two rows of trees forming the avenue are spaced 23 metres (75 ft) apart, with trees in each row separated by 16 metres (52 ft). The total length of the avenue is approximately 1.1 kilometres (0.68 mi; 3,600 ft).

In the third volume of Trees of Great Britain and Ireland, Henry John Elwes describes the avenue as "by far the best avenue of this tree that [he had] seen". Similarly, Sir Herbert Maxwell described the trees as being "clothed with verdure from the ground to the summit"; and their effect being "very stately and impressive".

Elwes commented on how the sandy soil suited the trees "remarkably well", and on the symmetry of the trees' tops and their uniformity. At the time of his study—in the early 1900s—he noted that the average height of the forty-year-old trees was 23 to 24.5 metres (75 to 80 ft), and that the tallest specimen he measured was 26.5 metres (87 ft) tall.
