= Pauline Spender-Clay =

American-English socialite (1880 – 1972)

The Honourable Pauline Spender-Clay
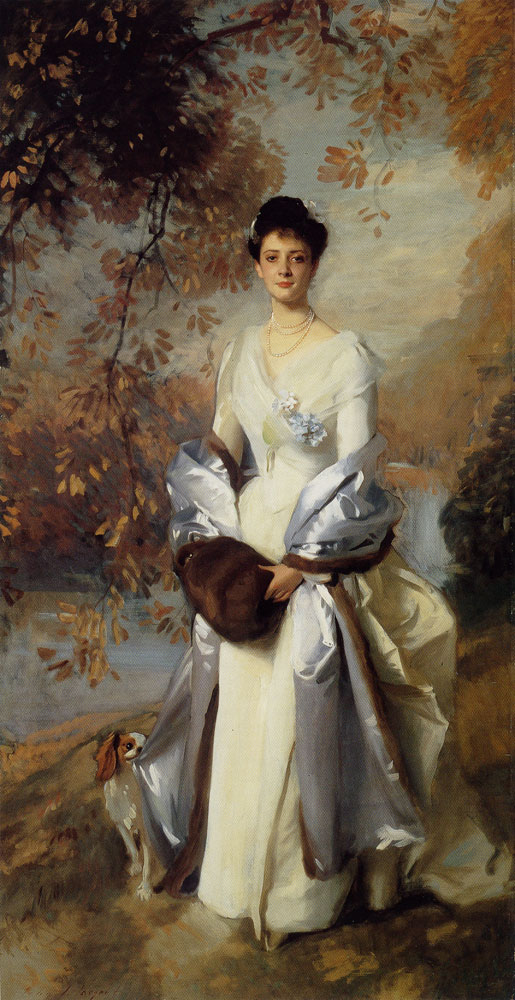
- Sargent's 1899 portrait of Pauline Astor
- Born: Pauline Astor; September 24, 1880; New York, United States
- Died: April 5, 1972 (aged 91)
- Spouse: Herbert Spender-Clay (m. 1904; died 1937)
- Children: 3
- Relatives: Astor family

Pauline Spender-Clay (née Astor; 24 September 1880 – 5 April 1972) was an American-English socialite known for her hospitality; her gardening, especially the cultivation of lilies; and her portrait painted by John Singer Sargent. Like many American heiresses, her engagements were a subject of speculation before her marriage. She volunteered as a Voluntary Aid Detachment nurse in World War I and opened up her house, Ford Manor, to be used as a military hospital in both World Wars. She was a member of the Astor family.

== Early life ==
She was born Pauline Astor in New York in 24 September 1880 to politician William Waldorf Astor and his wife Mary, née Dalgren. The family moved to London in 1891 and purchased the manor of Cliveden in 1893. In 1894, Pauline’s mother died, leaving her mistress of the estate.

Sargent painted Pauline with her pet King Charles spaniel, Mossie, in 1888 – 9.

About 1900, Henry Innes-Ker, 8th Duke of Roxburghe sought Pauline’s hand in marriage, and they were rumoured to be engaged, but Pauline 'gave him no encouragement' and Roxburghe could not agree with her father about her dowry. He became engaged to Mary Goelet three years later.

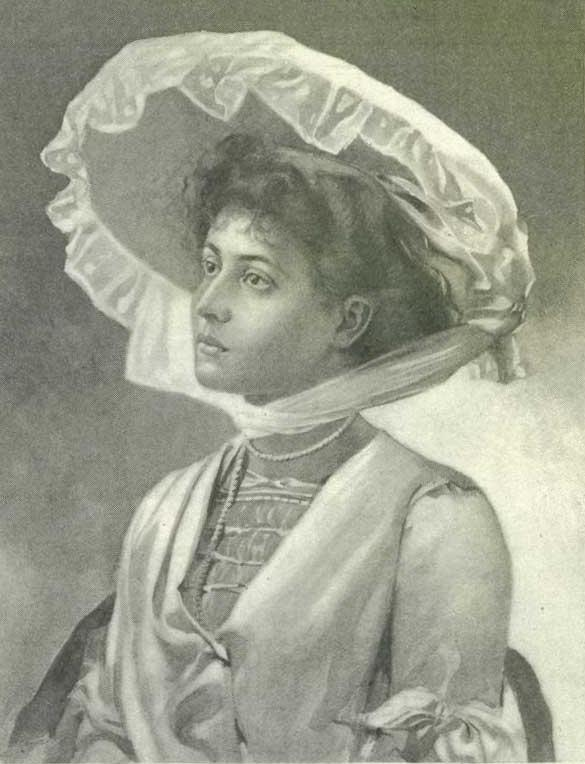
Pauline Astor in 1904, photograph by Alice Hughes

On 20 October 1904, Pauline married Lieutenant-Colonel Herbert H. Spender-Clay, wealthy heir to the Bass Brewing Company, and they settled at Ford Manor, Lingfield, where they became known for hosting parties. A son of Ettie Grenfell described Pauline as 'the most fascinating creature alive, with those sad enormous brown eyes.' They had three daughters: Phyllis Mary, Rachel Pauline, and Sybil Gwendoline, who died in infancy.

== World War I ==
During World War I, Pauline served as a Voluntary Aid Detachment nurse, and opened up Ford Manor to convalescing American soldiers, as her sister-in-law Nancy Astor was doing at Cliveden.

== Inter-war gardening and public service ==
In the 1920s and 1930s, Pauline was the main contributor to the gardens at Ford Manor, installing a water garden and arboretum. According to her daughter, 'lilies were her love,' and The Lily Year Book reported that she 'made a very real contribution to the growing of lilies in this country.'

She was Justice of the Peace for Sussex in 1920 and was involved with Girl Scouts and Doormice Patrols.

== World War II and later life ==
During World War II, Ford Manor was used as a nursery school for evacuees from London, and later as a hospital for Canadian soldiers. Widowed since 1937, Pauline made efforts to insure her properties and art from the instability of war. She had a new house, also called Ford Manor, built for herself on her grounds. The original house's name was changed to Greathed Manor in 1960.
