= Dormansland, Surrey =

Village and parish in Surrey, England

Coordinates: 51.166°N 0.008°E

Dormansland
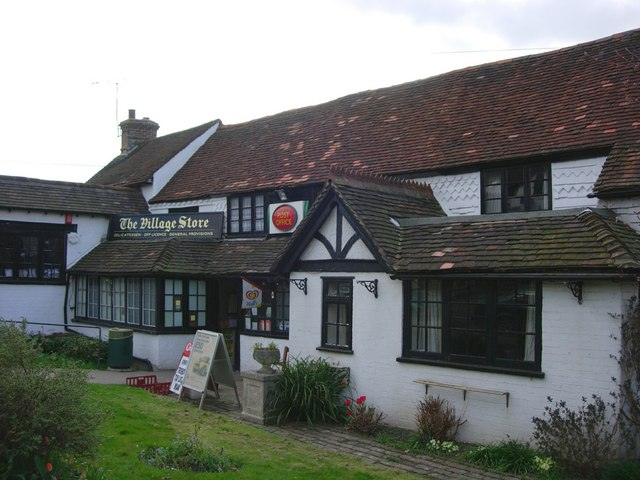
- Village store

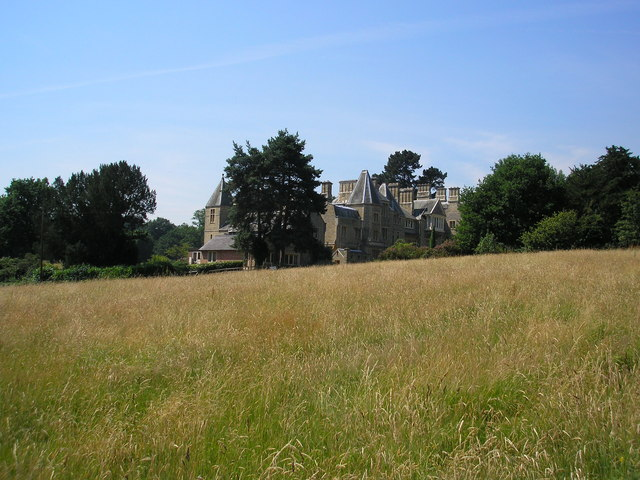
- Greathed Manor is a 19th-century stone mansion in land covering much of the east of Dormansland

- Location within Surrey
- Area: 27.16 km^{2} (10.49 sq mi)
- Population: 1,931 (Civil Parish 2011)
  - Density: 71/km^{2} (180/sq mi)
- OS grid reference: TQ404426
  - London: 25 miles (40 km)
- Civil parish: Dormansland
- District: Tandridge
- Shire county: Surrey
- Region: South East
- Country: England
- Sovereign state: United Kingdom
- Post town: Lingfield
- Postcode district: RH7
- Dialling code: 01342
- Police: Surrey
- Fire: Surrey
- Ambulance: South East Coast
- UK Parliament: East Surrey

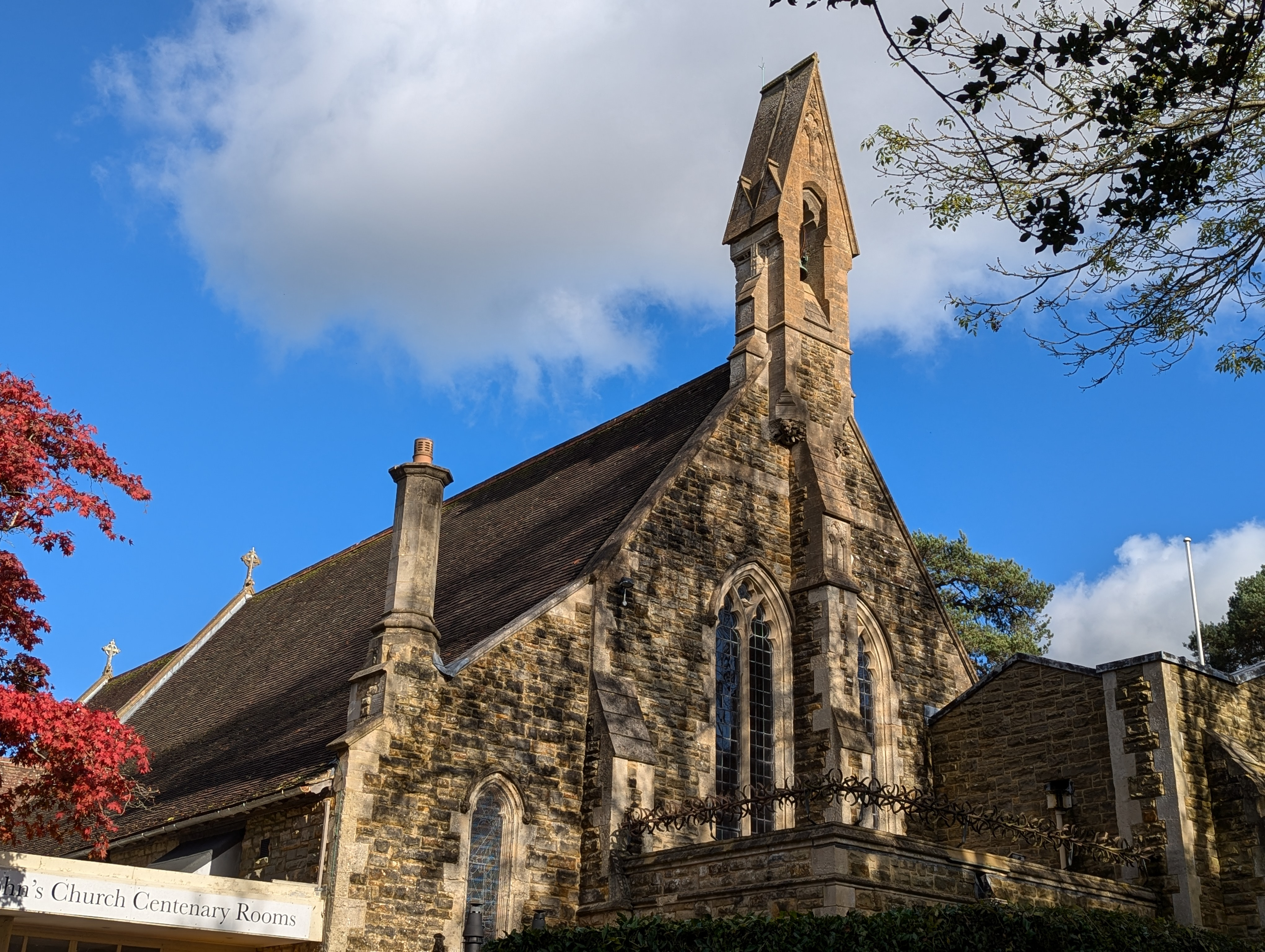
A view of the Church of England St John the Baptist church at the village of Dormansland, Surrey, England. October 2024.

Dormansland is a large village and civil parish with a low population approximately one mile south of Lingfield in Surrey, England. It was founded in the 19th century and is bordered on the east by the county of Kent and on the south by West Sussex and East Sussex. The nearest town is the small town of East Grinstead, immediately across the West Sussex border. The village has an inn named "The Plough" that serves food, located in Plough Road, at the northern edge of the village. There are two further public houses in the village, the Old House at Home in West Street and The Royal Oak in the High Street, both of which also serve food.

== Geography ==
Dormansland is a rural and semi-rural village of a largely cleared, flat area of the Weald save for the woodlands covering most of Greathed's private park, which is in Dormansland and scattered woodlands of Dormans Park, a housing estate toward the southern border. It is a large civil parish approximately one mile south of Lingfield. It is a recent village relative to the average age of an English village, and is bordered on the east by Kent and on the south by West Sussex and East Sussex, the only area of the county which borders East Sussex. The nearest town is the small town of East Grinstead, immediately across the West Sussex border which adjoins Dormans Park. The highest point of the south-east of Surrey is here: Dry Hill, 172 metres above sea level – an outcrop of the Low Weald, it is the 19th highest hill in Surrey.

The Prime Meridian passes through the parish, just west of its centre. London is centred 25 miles (40 km) north.

== History ==
The earliest known settlement in the parish was at Dry Hill, dating from approximately 500BC. The camp lay at the junction of trackways from the north and east.

A hamlet of Lingfield derived from Richard Derman who is recorded owner of part in 1435, with 'Dermannysland' appearing in the manorial rolls in 1489. Beacon Heath in the south of the parish, on a slight knoll, is said by tradition (which the Victoria County History says is 'probably true') to have been the site of a fire beacon. The east of the parish includes a large, partly farmed 'park and garden' as it is listed by English Heritage, around a listed building (at Grade II architecturally), Greathed Manor, built as Ford House in 1862, according to its inscription for the 'Ford' family. Robert Kerr, its architect, was principally a house designer in the mid-late 19th century, a co-founder of the Architectural Association and author of The English Gentlemen's House.

An interim period of many years saw the hamlet referred to as Bellagio or Bellaggio until the late 19th century. Until the enclosure (privatisation) of the Lingfield Commons in 1816, Dormansland consisted of a few farms and cottages. A Baptist Chapel was built in 1796, and a National School in 1851. By the opening of the Dormans railway station in 1884 the village had most of its modern layout, a small village quantity of 'villas and bungalows' having been constructed from 1880 until 1885.

The church of St John the Evangelist was built in 1883 to a design by Arthur Blomfield and consecrated in 1884. The ecclesiastical parish was created from part of the Lingfield parish the next year. In the following century small housing estates (principally Locks Meadow) were built on farmland in the parish, close to the existing development to create a clustered village surrounded chiefly by its own farmland.

The civil parish was created from part of Lingfield in 2000 and is on a larger basis than the ecclesiastical parish.

== Dormans Park ==
The Dormans Park Estate has its origins in the late 19th century when the land was bought by the Bellaggio Estate Company. The new railway station made the area easily accessible from London. The estate grew steadily during the early 20th century subject to mutual restrictive covenants to keep large plots in a wooded setting. Teletubbies creator Anne Wood is a current resident and former homeowners include Tom Cruise and Peter Andre.

== Demography and housing ==
2011 Census Homes
Output area	Detached	Semi-detached	Terraced	Flats and apartments	Caravans/temporary/mobile homes	shared between households
(Civil Parish)	610	412	130	99	7	0

The average level of accommodation in the region composed of detached houses was 28%, the average that was apartments was 22.6%.

2011 Census Key Statistics
Output area	Population	Households	% Owned outright	% Owned with a loan	hectares
(Civil Parish)	1,931	1,258	38.6%	39.0%	2,716

The proportion of households in the civil parish who owned their home outright compares to the regional average of 35.1%. The proportion who owned their home with a loan compares to the regional average of 32.5%. The remaining % is made up of rented dwellings (plus a negligible % of households living rent-free).

== Local government ==
Most local services are divided, depending on their type, between Tandridge District and Surrey County Councils. Additional local facilities are provided or maintained by the civil parish council, which provides for instance the village hall.

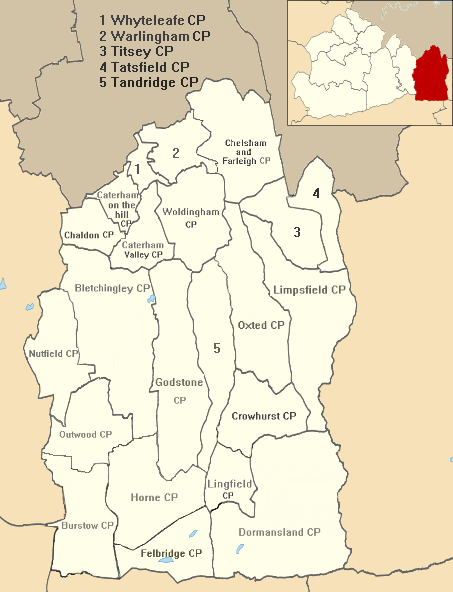
Civil Parishes in Tandridge District

== See also ==
- List of places of worship in Tandridge (district)
