= John Thadeus Delane =

British newspaper editor (1817–1879)

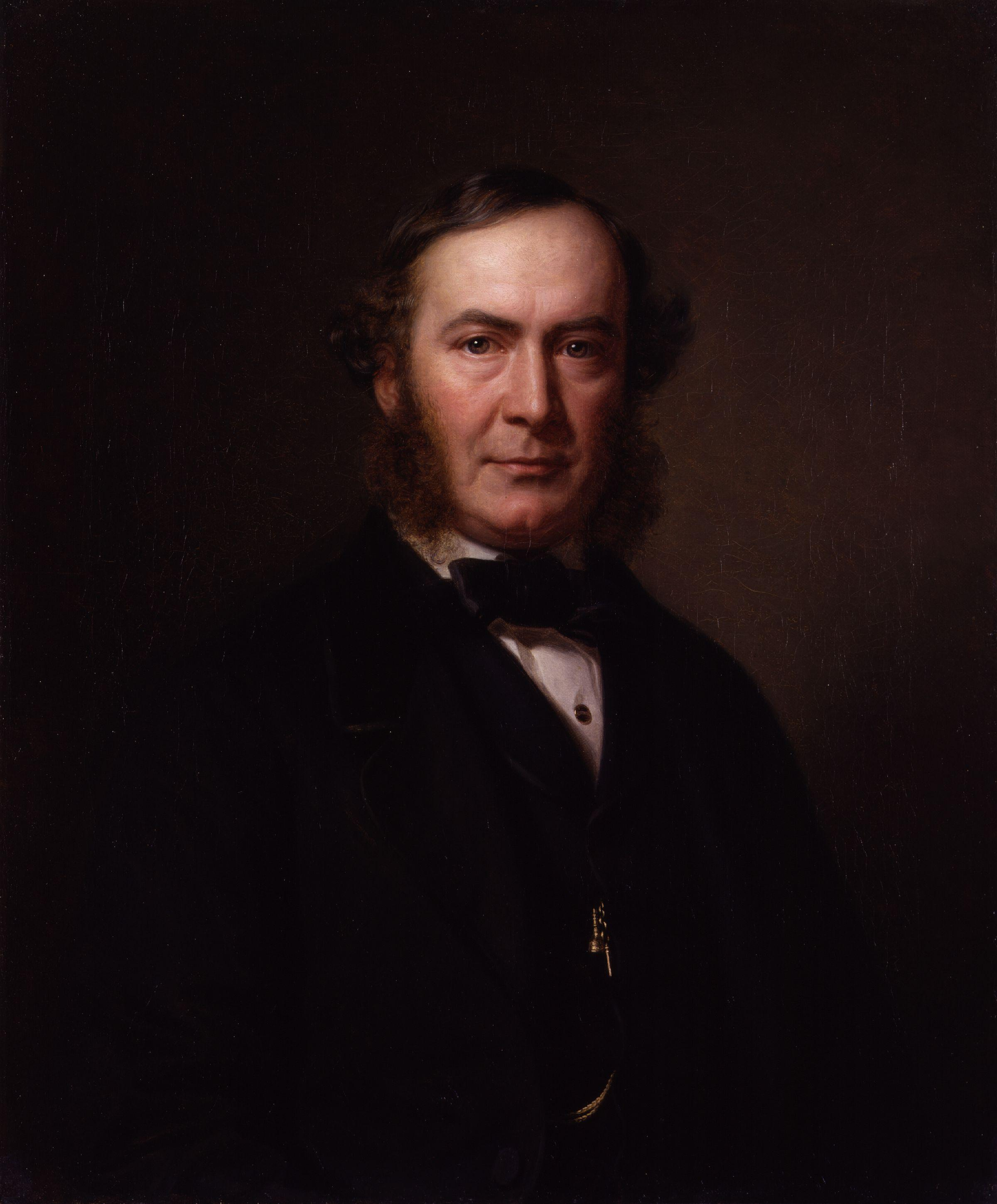
- Portrait by August Schiøtt, 1862
- Born: John Thadeus Delane; 11 October 1817; London, England
- Died: 22 November 1879 (aged 62); Ascot, Berkshire, England
- Education: King's College London; Magdalen Hall, Oxford
- Occupations: Journalist, editor

John Thadeus Delane (11 October 1817 – 22 November 1879), editor of The Times (London), was born in London.

He was the second son of W.F.A. Delane, a barrister, of an old Irish family, who about 1832 was appointed by Times publisher John Walter II as financial manager of The Times.

While still a boy he attracted Walter's attention, and it was always intended that he should find work on the paper. He received a good general education at private schools and King's College London, and also at Magdalen Hall, Oxford; after taking his degree in 1840 he at once began work on the paper, though later he read for the bar, being called in 1847.

In 1841 he succeeded Thomas Barnes as editor, a post which he occupied for thirty-six years. He from the first obtained the best introductions into society and the chief political circles, and had a position there such as no journalist had previously enjoyed, using his opportunities with a sure intuition for the way in which events would move.

His staff included writers such as Eneas Sweetland Dallas. under Delane's editorship, the paper developed a reputation for detailed reporting and influence within English journalism. He was known for his broad interests, editorial judgement, and ability to focus on central issues in complex matters.

His general policy was to keep the paper a national organ of opinion above party, but with a tendency to sympathize with the Liberal movements of the day. He admired Palmerston and respected Lord Aberdeen, and was of considerable use to both; and it was Lord Aberdeen himself who, in 1845, told him of the impending repeal of the Corn Laws, an incident round which many incorrect stories have gathered. The history, however, of the events during the thirteen administrations, between then and 1877, in which The Times, and therefore Delane, played an important part cannot here be recapitulated. In 1877 his health gave way, and he retired from the editorship; and on 22 November 1879 he died at his country seat, Ascot Heath House in Berkshire.

A biography by his nephew, Arthur Irwin Dasent, was published in 1908.

Media offices
Preceded by Thomas Barnes	Editor of The Times; 1841–1877	Succeeded by Thomas Chenery
