= Lillian Richter =

American lithographer

- Born: 1915; Newport, RI
- Died: 2000 (aged 84–85); New Haven, CT

Lillian Richter (1915–2000) was an American lithographer. Richter did work for the Works Progress Administration (WPA). Her work is included in the collections of the Smithsonian American Art Museum, the Metropolitan Museum of Art, the Art Institute of Chicago, the Philadelphia Museum of Art, and the National Gallery of Art, Washington
