= Antony Kloman =

Antony Joseph Trapnell Kloman (born Joseph Trapnell Kloman; 19 June 1904 – January 28, 1993) was an American art patron active in the art world in the 1950s. The story of Antony Kloman's life remains quite mysterious and sketchy.

== World War II activities ==
Born in Haymarket, Virginia, Kloman graduated from Washington College in Chestertown, Maryland and in the 1920s is reported to have worked for the Corcoran Art Gallery in Washington as Assistant to the Director. During World War II he served with the Office of Strategic Services (OSS), where he was involved in the training of secret agents. From 1944 to 1945, he was posted at the US Embassy in Stockholm under the cover of Cultural Attaché, where his assignment was to attempt to recruit and infiltrate agents into Germany. After the war he lived in New York and in London, where he allegedly was employed by Hambros Bank. Whether, once he had left Stockholm, he was still employed by any secret service is not known.

== Arts career ==
Kloman was the organiser of the International Sculpture Competition on the Theme of the Unknown Political Prisoner from 1951 to 1953, held at the Institute of Contemporary Arts in London, at which he served as the first program director. This later turned out to be financed by the U.S. State Department, via the "benefactor" John (Jock) Whitney, as a front.

At the time of the competition, Kloman was married (since 1948) to Theodate (Theo) Johnson, the sister of the architect Philip Johnson, which explains his close connections to the MoMA. Franz Schulze wrote in his biography of Johnson about this relationship: "[... In 1953 (sic), Theodate Johnson] succumbed to the allure of Tony Kloman, a man remembered by the Johnson family as long on looks and charm, short on a commitment to any definable career. He trafficked a little in antiques, painted an occasional portrait of somebody who could afford it, and idled much of the rest of the time, content to survive on Theo's money. Their divorce was filed and settled in 1956."

In the late 1950s, he settled as a painter, mainly children's portraits, in Newport, Rhode Island. He died in 1993 in Manatee County, Florida.
