= William Waldorf Astor =

American-British attorney, politician, businessman, and philanthropist

The Right Honourable The Viscount Astor
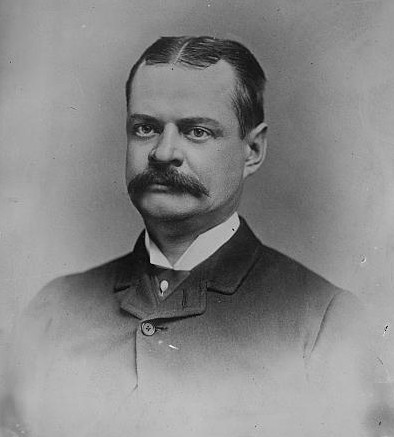
- William Waldorf Astor, 1st Viscount Astor

Member of the House of Lords Lord Temporal
- In office 1 January 1916 – 18 October 1919; Hereditary peerage
- Preceded by: Peerage created
- Succeeded by: The 2nd Viscount Astor

2nd United States Minister to Italy
- In office November 21, 1882 – March 1, 1885
- President: Chester A. Arthur
- Preceded by: George Perkins Marsh
- Succeeded by: John Stallo

Member of the New York Senate from the 10th district
- In office 1 January 1880 – 31 December 1881
- Preceded by: Daniel B. St. John
- Succeeded by: Joseph Koch

Member of the New York State Assembly from the New York County's 11th district
- In office 1 January 1878 – 31 December 1878
- Preceded by: Elliot Cowdin
- Succeeded by: James M. Varnum

Personal details
- Born: William Waldorf Astor; 31 March 1848 New York City, U.S.
- Died: 18 October 1919 (aged 71) Brighton, Sussex, England
- Party: Republican (U.S.)
- Spouse: Mary Dahlgren Paul (m. 1878; died 1894)
- Children: Waldorf Astor; Pauline Astor; John Rudolph Astor; John Jacob Astor V; Gwendolyn Enid Astor
- Parents: John Jacob Astor III; Charlotte Augusta Gibbes
- Relatives: See Astor family
- Education: Columbia Law School

William Waldorf Astor, 1st Viscount Astor (31 March 1848 – 18 October 1919) was an American-English attorney, politician, diplomat, hotelier, publisher and philanthropist. Astor was a scion of the very wealthy Astor family of New York City. He moved to England in 1891, became a British subject in 1899, and was made a peer as Baron Astor in 1916 and Viscount Astor in 1917 for his contributions to war charities. The census-designated place of Waldorf, Maryland is named after him.

== Early life and education ==
William Waldorf Astor was born in New York City. He was the only child of the financier and philanthropist John Jacob Astor III and Charlotte Augusta Gibbes. He studied in Germany and in Italy under the care of private tutors and a governess.

In his early adult years, Astor returned to the United States and went to Columbia Law School, graduating with a LL.B. in 1875. He was called to the United States Bar in 1875. He worked for a short time in law practice and in the management of his father's estate of financial and real estate holdings.

== Personal life ==
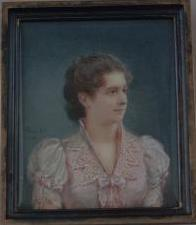
Mary Dahlgren Paul

Astor married Mary Dahlgren Paul on 6 June 1878. She is buried in Trinity Church Cemetery Manhattan. They had five children:

- Waldorf Astor, 2nd Viscount Astor (19 May 1879 – 30 September 1952)
- Pauline Astor (24 September 1880 – 5 May 1972), married soldier and politician Herbert Spender-Clay (1875–1937) in 1904. They had three daughters.
- John Rudolph Astor (28 November 1881 – 28 December 1881), buried in Trinity Church Cemetery.
- Lt. Col. John Jacob Astor V, 1st Baron Astor of Hever (20 May 1886 – 19 July 1971)
- Gwendolyn Enid Astor (1889–1902), no children, buried in Trinity Church Cemetery.

== Politics ==
After some time practising law, Astor thought he had found his true calling and an opportunity to make a name for himself outside of his family's fortune by entering the political realm. In 1877, with his eyes set on the United States Congress, Astor entered New York City politics as a Republican.

He was elected as a member of the New York State Assembly (New York Co., 11th D.) in 1878; and of the New York State Senate (10th D.) in 1880 and 1881. Astor was likely supported by the boss of the New York State Republican machine, Roscoe Conkling, with whom his family was involved.

In 1880, the Maryland General Assembly voted to rename Beantown in Charles County, Maryland "Waldorf" in honor of him.

In 1881, Astor was defeated by Roswell P. Flower as a candidate for the United States Congress. A second attempt at the seat also resulted in defeat. His shy nature could not handle the political attacks on his character. This was the end of his political career. The press used his political failures as fodder for harsh criticisms.

In 1882, President Chester A. Arthur appointed Astor Minister to Italy, a post he held until 1885. He told Astor, "Go and enjoy yourself, my dear boy." While living in Rome, Astor developed a lifelong passion for art and sculpture.

== Move to England ==
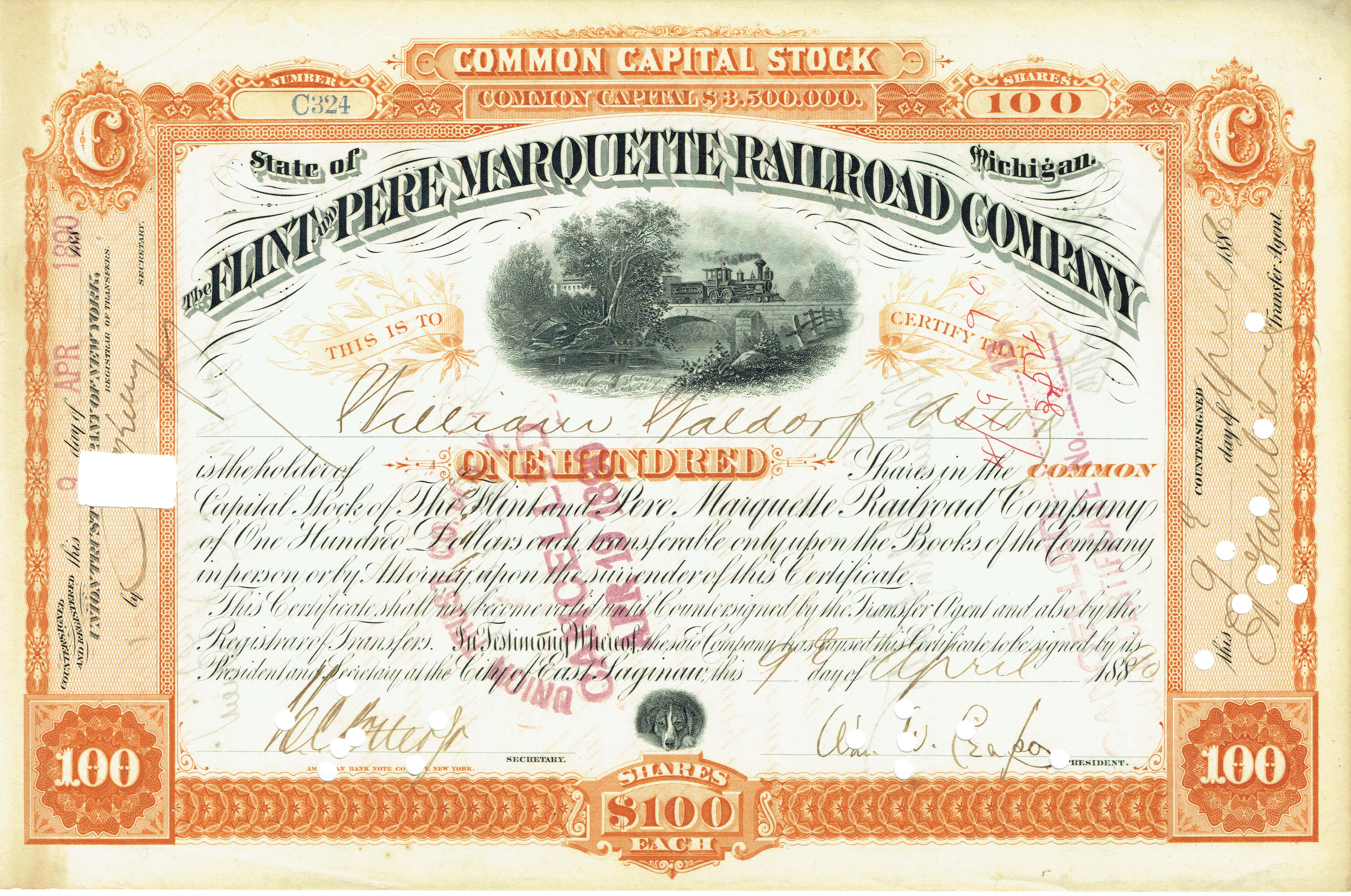
Share of the Flint and Pere Marquette Railroad Company, issued 9. April 1890, owned by William Waldorf Astor

Upon the death of his father in February 1890, Astor inherited a personal fortune that made him the second richest man in America. Economists widely agree that John D. Rockefeller was the wealthiest American of that time.

In 1890 Astor initiated the construction of the luxurious Waldorf Hotel on the site of his former residence. At 13 stories high, it overshadowed the adjacent mansion of his aunt, the socialite Caroline "Lina" Schermerhorn Astor. Lina complained bitterly about the commercial establishment next door. However, in 1897, her son John Jacob Astor IV persuaded her to move away and replaced their mansion with the slightly larger in height and width Astoria Hotel, which was operated as an extension of the Waldorf; the complex became the Waldorf-Astoria Hotel.

In the meantime, the friction had blown up into a feud. Aunt Lina also insisted that she, not William's wife Mary, was the Mrs. Astor in New York society, just as she had when that title belonged to her husband's elder brother's wife, Charlotte Astor, when she was alive.

As a result of the conflict, Astor moved with his wife and children to England. He rented Lansdowne House in London until 1893. That year, he purchased a country estate, Cliveden in Taplow, Buckinghamshire, from the Duke of Westminster. In 1899, William Waldorf Astor picked up British citizenship, which drew him further away from American history.

To disappear from public view, in the summer of 1892, Astor faked his own death by having his staff report to American reporters that he had died, apparently from pneumonia. However, the ruse was soon discovered, and Astor was mocked in the press.

In 1895, he built a gothic mansion on London's Victoria Embankment at Two Temple Place overlooking the River Thames. He commissioned architect John Loughborough Pearson to design a $1.5 million building, a "crenellated Tudor stronghold" which he used as an office for managing his extensive holdings.

Astor made several business acquisitions while he lived in London. In 1892, he purchased the Pall Mall Gazette, and in 1893 established the Pall Mall Magazine. In 1911 he acquired The Observer, a national newspaper. In 1912 he sold the Magazine, and in 1914 made a present of the Gazette and The Observer, with the building in Newton Street and its contents, to his son Waldorf Astor.

In 1903, he acquired the Hever Castle Estate near Edenbridge, Kent, about 30 miles south of London. The estate of over 3,500 acres had at its centre a castle built in 1270 where Anne Boleyn lived as a child. Astor invested a great deal of time and money in restoring the castle, building what is known as the "Tudor Village", and creating a lake and lavish gardens. He also added the Italian Garden (including fernery) to display his collection of statuary and ornaments.

In 1906, he gave his eldest son Waldorf Astor and his new daughter-in-law, Nancy Witcher Langhorne, the Cliveden estate as well as the Sancy diamond as wedding presents. The stone had been purchased earlier from the art dealer A.K.Rudanovsky, whose firm handled several prominent European jewels at the time. Nancy Astor (as she became on her marriage) became Britain's first seated female Member of Parliament.

In 1908, building on his success with the Waldorf-Astoria Hotel in New York, Astor financed the Waldorf Hotel in London's West End.

== Philanthropy and peerage ==
Astor became a British subject in 1899. He continued his philanthropic activities, like his father. Among the charities he supported were the Hospital for Sick Children, Great Ormond Street (to which he gave $250,000 in 1903); University College London (including a gift of £20,000 in 1902 for professorships); the Cancer Research Fund; Oxford University; Cambridge University; the National Society for the Prevention of Cruelty to Children; the British Red Cross Society; Gordon Memorial College, Khartoum; the Soldiers and Sailors Families Association; and the Women's Memorial to Queen Victoria. His gifts to war charities included $125,000 to the Prince of Wales's National Relief Fund; a similar amount to Princess Louise's Officers' Families Fund; $200,000 to the British Red Cross; $25,000 to Queen Mary's Employment Committee; and a similar sum to the Lord Mayor's National Bands Fund. He gave $5,000 to King Edward's Hospital Fund annually starting with its founding in 1897.

In recognition of his work for charity, on 1 January 1916, he was offered and accepted a peerage of the United Kingdom under the title of Baron Astor. On 3 June 1917, he was elevated to the rank of viscount as the Viscount Astor. The elevation was controversial, as some felt that a rich American had bought his way into the English aristocracy.

== Death ==
On 18 October 1919, he unexpectedly died of heart failure in the lavatory of his seaside house at Brighton in Sussex. His ashes were buried under the marble floor of the Astor family chapel (also called the Octagon Temple) at Cliveden.

== Arms ==
Coat of arms of William Waldorf Astor
Coronet A Coronet of a Viscount Crest From a Mount Vert a Falcon rising proper ensigned by three Mullets Gold Escutcheon Or, a falcon resting on a dexter hand couped at the wrist proper and gauntleted gules in chief two fleurs-de-lys of the last Supporters Dexter: a North American Indian; Sinister: a North American fur trapper; each habited accoutred and holding in the exterior hand a Rifle all proper Motto Ad Astra (To the stars)

== Written works ==
- Valentino: An Historical Romance of the Sixteenth Century in Italy (1885)
- Sforza, a Story of Milan (1889)
- Pharaoh's Daughter and Other Stories (1890)
- The Astor collection of illuminated manuscripts : auction in London, 21st June 1988, Sotheby's: twenty illuminated manuscripts from the celebrated collection of William Waldorf Astor, ...from the library at Cliveden, and subsequently part of the Astor deposit at the Bodleian Library, sold by the order of the Trustees of the astor family, Sotheby's, 1988.

== Notes ==
New York State Assembly
Preceded by Elliot C. Cowdin	New York State Assembly; New York County, 11th District; 1878	Succeeded by James M. Varnum
New York State Senate
Preceded by Daniel B. St. John	New York State Senate; 10th District; 1880–1881	Succeeded by Joseph Koch
Peerage of the United Kingdom
New creation	Viscount Astor; 1917–1919	Succeeded by Waldorf Astor
New creation	Baron Astor; 1916–1919	Succeeded by Waldorf Astor
