= John Edward Delane =

American racing driver and businessman

John Delane
- Nationality: American
- Born: 13 June 1945 (age 80) Victoria, Texas
- Former teams: Team Tyrrell
- Championships: Historic Formula One FIA Lurani Trophy FIA Masters Historic Formula One

Championship titles
- 2011, 2013: FIA Historic Formula One

John Delane (born 13 June 1945) is a Historic Formula One racing driver and businessman from the United States. His race career began in 1987. and includes winning 17 Fédération Internationale de l'Automobile (FIA) Titles. He is among the most successful of historic racing's FIA drivers' champions, competing in Historic Formula One and Formula Junior class. He was the first American to win the overall Historic Formula One Championship, and the first time anyone has won two overall FIA historic championships in the same year. He is the co-founder of the Team Tyrrell race team

== FIA Championships ==
In 2007, 2010 and 2011 Delane was the FIA Lurani Formula Junior Champion with his Lotus 18

In 2011 Delane was the FIA Historic Formula One Champion with his Tyrrell 002

In 2013 Delane was the FIA Masters Historic Formula One Champion with his Tyrrell 002

== FIA Titles ==
Fédération Internationale de l'Automobile (FIA) Titles
YEAR	CHAMPIONSHIP	TITLE	CAR
2002	FIA Thoroughbred Grand Prix	Historic Cup Winner Class A “Rookie Award”	Tyrrell 002
2003	FIA Thoroughbred Grand Prix	Historic Cup Winner Class A	TYrrell 002
2004	FIA Thoroughbred Grand Prix	Historic Cup Winner Class A	Tyrrell 002
2005	FIA Thoroughbred Grand Prix	Historic Cup Winner Class A	Tyrrell 002
2005	FIA Lurani Trophy for Formula Junior Cars	Class C Winner	Lotus 18
2006	FIA Thoroughbred Grand Prix	Historic Cup Winner Class A	Tyrrell 002
2006	FIA Lurani Trophy for Formula Junior Cars	Class C Winner	Lotus 18
2007	FIA Thoroughbred Grand Prix	Historic Cup Winner Class A	Tyrrell 002
2007	FIA Lurani Trophy for Formula Junior Cars	Champion	Lotus 18
2010	FIA Historic Formula One Championship	Historic Cup Winner Class A	Tyrrell 002
2010	FIA Lurani Trophy for Formula Junior Cars	Champion	Lotus 18
2011	FIA Historic Formula One Championship	Champion	Tyrrell 002
2011	FIA Lurani Trophy for Formula Junior Cars	Champion	Lotus 18
2012	FIA Historic Formula One Championship	Historic Cup Winner Class A	Tyrrell 002
2012	FIA Lurani Trophy for Formula Junior Cars	Class C Winner	Lotus 18
2013	FIA Masters Historic Formula One Championship	Champion	Tyrrell 002
2013	FIA Lurani Trophy for Formula Junior Cars	Class C Winner	Lotus 18
