= Abigail Stoneman =

- Born: Abigail (unknown surname); Estimate after 1740; Likely Newport, Rhode Island
- Died: After 1777
- Other names: Mrs. Treville

Abigail Stoneman (birth after 1740, fl 1760 to 1777) was a Colonial American widowed woman who operated inns and tea and coffee houses in Rhode Island, Massachusetts, and New York. She offered musical entertainment and dancing.

== Background ==
In the 18th century, it was unusual for women to operate businesses. Any property or money a woman may have owned before or acquired during her marriage was managed by her husband. Stoneman became a feme sole as a widowed woman and could thus operate businesses and manage her financial decisions.

== Early life ==
Abigail's birth year and parents are unknown, but it is estimated that she was born after 1740. She was described by publisher Solomon Southwick to give proper prominence to the successful business owner as she married a Knight of Malta. She was,

"a lady descended from a respectable family, of good genius, a very polite and genteel address, and extremely well accomplished in every branch of family economy."

— Newport Mercury, September 5, 1774

== First marriage ==
Abigail acquired the surname Stoneman from her first marriage, likely to Samuel Stoneman, a lieutenant of the Rhode Island regiment who fought in the French and Indian War between 1757 and 1760. He became an adjutant during that war against Crown Point and Canada. Her husband is believed to have died by 1760.

Stoneman had several sons and two daughters when she established her business in Boston (1770). She also had at least two enslaved people at that time.

Stoneman lived in a large house on Marlborough Street and attended the First Congregational Church. Her house was robbed of some china and $100 Spanish dollars in 1766.

== Businesswoman ==
In May 1767, Stoneman opened a coffee house and a store of goods from the West Indies in Newport called The Merchant's Coffee House. It was established at the Sign of the King's Arms. To capitalize on the summer tourist season, she opened a business in the nearby town of Middletown in 1768 and added a ballroom the following year. She offered "genteel lodgings" and food, like syllabub, orange and lemon cheesecake, cakes, and tarts. In October 1769, she moved to Whitehall (in Middletown) that she called Vauxhall. George Berkeley had lived at the house.

In March 1770, the Boston Massacre occurred on King Street (now State Street). The attack occurred at the entrance of a building Stoneman acquired and repaired. Stoneman offered coffee and short-term lodging in her Boston business from 1770 to 1772. One of her boarders, William Blodget, provided accounting services and painted a portrait of Stoneman and her daughter.

She returned to Middletown by June 1772 and operated Vauxhall for the summer tourist season. In the winter, she operated the British Coffee House in Newport. She simultaneously operated other taverns and coffee or tea houses. The only woman in Newport to do so at the time, she acquired a liquor license to operate a tavern, King's Arms, during the winter and spring months. She offered lodging, musical entertainment, and dancing, where only men paid to dance. She also advertised that she had billiard tables to draw in customers. The tavern was the site of the Newport Assembly meetings on Thursday evenings.

During the course of her business, she offered credit and expanded her businesses. In one case, one of her customers, Benjamin Wickham, signed an IOU for £13 on a nine of clubs from one of her decks of cards on March 20, 1769. It later became evidence in a suit that Stoneman filed for non-payment. It is also historical evidence of the manner in which business was conducted in the 18th century and that Stoneman would use the judicial system when needed to settle her debts. She placed notices in the Newport Mercury to collect on debts, the only woman in the town to do so at the time. Stoneman developed business alliances typical of wealthy men. She had lines of credit with other businessowners, who were also her customers to whom she extended credit. They included the Eastons, Coggeshalls, and other leading families of Newport. She was deemed a successful businesswoman based upon her ability to make capital improvements to her businesses.

== Second marriage ==
She was the first woman from Newport to marry a titled Englishman when she married John Treville, a Knight of Malta in Hampton, Connecticut on August 28, 1774. He was the captain of the cavalry of His Most Christian Majesty's Service. She sold her property after the marriage and moved with her husband to New York.

There are a couple of theories about what happened to her husband. He may have fled after spending most of her money or he may have fought as a loyalist in the War of Independence.

== New York ==
By October 25, 1777, Stoneman established the London Coffee-House on Broad Street in what is now Lower Manhattan of New York City. Like her previous businesses, she offered lodging, entertainment, and liquid refreshments. In an advertisement for the business, she stated that she was indebted to the "politeness and humanity" of the British military gentry. She offered breakfast and dinners. The business was located near Fraunces Queen's Head (known now as Fraunces Tavern).

== Bibliography ==
- Hartigan-O'Connor, Ellen (2009). The ties that buy : women and commerce in revolutionary America. Philadelphia : University of Pennsylvania Press. ISBN 978-0-8122-4144-0.
- James, Edward T.; James, Janet Wilson; Boyer, Paul (1971). Notable American women 1607-1959 : a biographical dictionary. Cambridge, Mass. : Belknap Press. pp. 390–391. ISBN 978-0-674-62734-5.
