= Bearwood House =

Country house in Berkshire, England

Bearwood
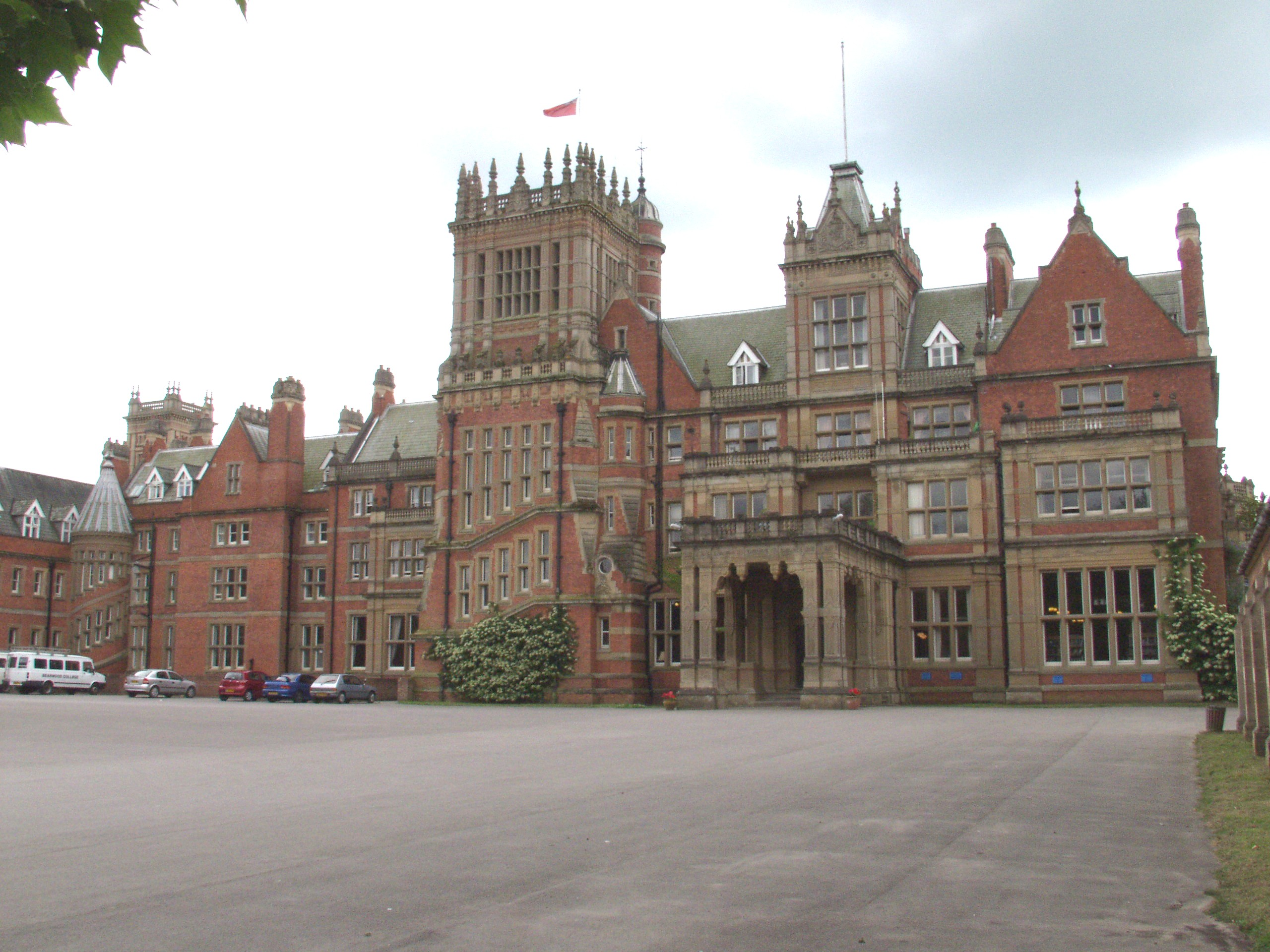
- The house pictured in 2004

- Location within Berkshire
- Alternative names: Bear Wood

General information
- Type: House
- Architectural style: Jacobethan
- Location: Sindlesham, Berkshire, England
- Coordinates: 51.4152°N 0.884°W
- Year built: 1865–74
- Governing body: Inspired Education Group

Design and construction
- Architect: Robert Kerr

National Register of Historic Parks and Gardens
- Official name: Bearwood College
- Designated: 30 October 1987
- Reference no.: 1000414

Listed Building – Grade II*
- Official name: Former Bearwood College and terraces to south
- Designated: 14 October 1986
- Reference no.: 1135967

Listed Building – Grade II
- Official name: Bearwood College Chapel
- Designated: 14 October 1986
- Reference no.: 1118160

Listed Building – Grade II
- Official name: Main Lodge to Bearwood
- Designated: 29 April 1987
- Reference no.: 1136249

Listed Building – Grade II
- Official name: Oak Lodge
- Designated: 29 April 1987
- Reference no.: 1136243

Bearwood or Bear Wood, in Sindlesham, Berkshire, England, is a Victorian country house built for John Walter, the owner of The Times. The architect was Robert Kerr and the house was constructed between 1865 and 1874. The family fortune had been made by Walter's grandfather, John Walter I. Originally a coal merchant and underwriter, in 1785 John Walter had established The Daily Universal Register, renamed as The Times in 1788. In 1816 Walter's father, John Walter II purchased the Bear Wood estate in Berkshire from the Crown Estate and in 1822 built a small villa on the site of the present house. Nothing remains of this first building, which was swept away in the gargantuan rebuilding undertaken by Kerr for John Walter III. The cost, £129,000, equivalent to £12,612,114 in 2025, was double the original estimate.

In 1919 the house was sold and subsequently gifted to the Royal Merchant Navy School, which had been established in the City of London in 1827 to educate the sons of merchant sailors lost at sea. The school moved into Bearwood in 1922. In 1966 it was renamed Bearwood College, but falling pupil numbers, declining revenues and increasing costs led to the college's closure in 2014. In the same year the site was purchased by the Reddam Group of international schools and renamed Reddam House, Berkshire.

Described by Nikolaus Pevsner as "one of the major Victorian monuments of England", the house is a Grade II* listed building.

== History ==
John Walter I was born in London in 1738. Making, and subsequently losing, a fortune as a coal merchant and underwriter, in 1785, Walter established The Daily Universal Register, "to record the principal occurrences of the times". Renamed The Times in 1788, within twenty years The Thunderer had become the newspaper of record for the British Empire. By a combination of exceptionally fast reporting; The Times' report of Nelson's victory at the Battle of Trafalgar was published several days before the British government received the official communique from the Admiralty; and technological innovation, The Times had the first steam-powered printing press; Walter's son, John Walter II, made the newspaper profitable. Some of the revenues were deployed to buy the estate of Bear Wood from the Crown, and in 1822 Walter II built a small villa, in a neoclassical style, on the site. In 1864 his son, John Walter III, employed Robert Kerr to replace his father's villa with an enormous mansion in the Jacobethan style.

Robert Kerr (1823–1904) was an architect born in Aberdeen. His practice was never large, and his prominence owed more to his writings, specifically, The Gentleman's House: Or, How to Plan English Residences from the Parsonage to the Palace, published in 1864. Pevsner suggests that this gained Kerr the Bearwood commission in 1865, a job that Walter had originally intended to give to the much more notable William Burn. The first part of Kerr's tome comprised an immensely detailed guide to every aspect of the design of the mid-Victorian country house; sections included, "Privacy – defined and exemplified", "Salubrity – general rules", the "Boudoir – defined", the "Smoking room – position, access, prospect and ventilation, "Water closets – notes thereon", the "Soiled linen closet – position and arrangement" and "Flower gardens – several kinds". The second focussed on a series of plans of actual houses, and included Kerr's, often rather dismissive, comments on his predecessors and contemporaries. Vanbrugh's Blenheim Palace is considered "unsuitably grand", while the planning of Paxton's Mentmore Towers is "incomprehensibly tortuous". (Note: Michael Hall, the architectural writer, and editor of Apollo, describes Kerr's work as, "the best known Victorian manual of domestic design, an exhaustive and faintly pompous guide to every element of planning and domestic technology, from general principles to the details of fitting out a fish-larder".)

The planning of Bearwood followed very closely the details of Kerr's book. Mark Girouard, in his pioneering study, The Victorian Country House, calls it a "synopsis [with] interminable offices, corridors, stairs and entrances". Everything for the house's construction and operation was undertaken on site; the 4,477,000 red bricks used were fired in the Bearwood brick kilns, the gas came from the estate's gasworks, the "elaborate and massive joinery" was carved in the estate's workshops. Michael Hall, the architectural writer, records that 380 workmen were on the Bearwood site in 1868. The final cost of the house came to £129,000, double Kerr's estimate. His attempts to negotiate an increase on his commission were unsuccessful. By the time of the house's completion, Walter's stupendous income from The Times, £50,000 a year in 1865, was beginning to falter. The Times' circulation, already declining, came under more sustained assault in the decades ahead, with the rise of the middle-market newspapers, in particular the Daily Mail. In 1908 John Walter's grandson, John Walter V, saw control of the paper pass to the Mail's founder, Lord Northcliffe.

In 1911 John Walter V put the Bearwood estate up for sale. It failed to secure a buyer, and during the First World War, the house was used as a billet for Canadian soldiers. In 1919 the house with some of the grounds was purchased by Sir Thomas Lane Devitt, chairman of the shipping company Devitt and Moore and founder of the Naval College at Pangbourne. The purchase enabled Devitt to relocate the Royal Merchant Navy School from its original site in central London. (Note: The Royal Merchant Navy Education Foundation's history of the school records that life for pupils at Bearwood was not without its challenges. "Bearwood, being the same age as Snaresbrook (the school's previous home), was bound to need similar repairs. For several years there were dreadful problems with sewage.")

The school, renamed Bearwood College in the 1960s, continued to operate at the site until 2014. In the early 1980s, the school separated from its founding charity, which retained ownership of the house and estate, leading to a lengthy legal dispute between the governors of the college and the trustees of the Merchant Seamans Foundation that was finally concluded by mediation in 2011. Falling rolls saw the final closure of the school in 2014, and its purchase by the Inspired Education Group which has run the school, renamed Reddam House, Berkshire, since that time.

== Architecture and description ==
Girouard considers Bearwood one of the best examples of "muscular Victorian gothic". In his work, The Victorian Country House, he writes: "The influence of Highclere is apparent, but it is as if Highclere had been sent on a weight-lifting course. The entrance front is like a sock in the jaw". The north (entrance) front is approached through an avenue of Wellingtonias. (Note: In the mid-1860s, Walter planted an even more impressive tree-scape, the Wellingtonia Avenue, about 4 miles (6.4 km) from Bearwood, as a tribute to the Duke of Wellington.) The frontage is symmetrical to its right side, but breaks into an enormous tower to the left. A large porte-cochère leads into the entrance hall. The whole is, mainly, of two main storeys, with large attics and even larger basements. It is constructed of red brick with dressings in Mansfield stone, a form of limestone. The south, garden, front is less frenetic than the north, although again interrupted by a tower to the right side. Large terraces, included within the building's listing status, drop away from the house towards the once-extensive, formal gardens.

The interior centres on a large, top-lit picture gallery. This was constructed to house Walter's collection of Flemish pictures inherited from his father. The pictures are now gone. The entrance hall is panelled in Spanish leather and has a dividing screens passage in emulation of medieval examples. Girouard considers the main staircase the house's coup de théâtre; "one raises one's eyes and finds oneself looking up to the roof of the tower, 88 feet [27 metres] above, painted dark blue and sprinkled with gold stars". The other particularly notable feature is the array of highly specialised service offices, including the Cleaning Room, the Brushing Room, the Gun Room, the Plate Safe and the Odd Room.

The school chapel was constructed in 1934–1935 and was designed by Herbert Baker. Funding came from the Inchcape family, in memory of the shipowner, James Mackay, 1st Earl of Inchcape, who was Chairman of the Merchant Seamans Fund. Bearwood House is a Grade II* listed building, and stands in parkland with its own Grade II* listing. Many of the estate buildings have independent listings, including the main lodge, the Oak Lodge, and the school's chapel. Nikolaus Pevsner, in his Buildings of England, describes Bearwood as "in its brazen way, one of the major Victorian monuments of England".

== In media ==
The house has appeared in a number of television series including; Lord Mountbatten: The Last Viceroy (1986), Restless, Midsomer Murders, Endeavour, The Crown, and Soldier Soldier.

== Gallery ==
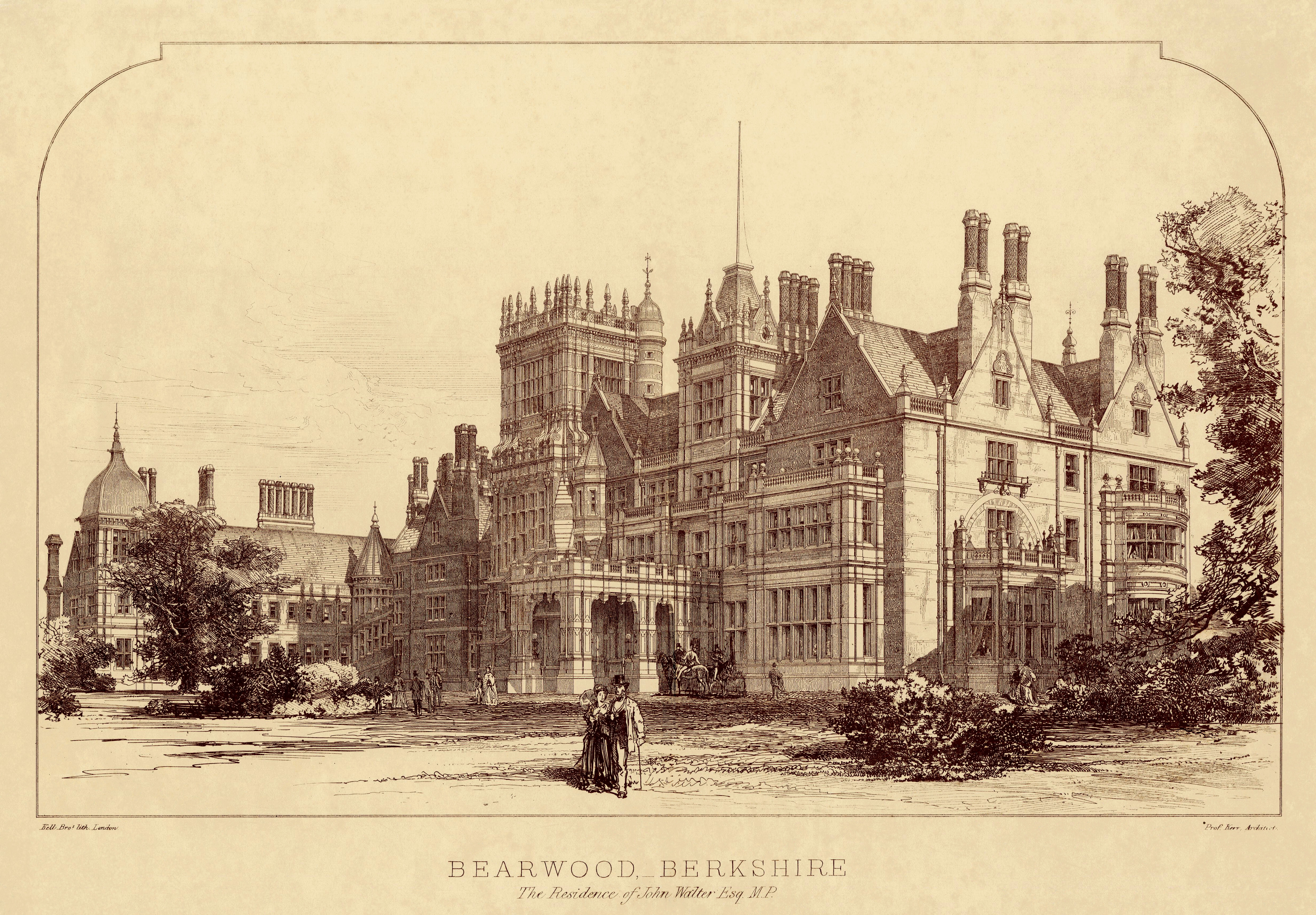
Print of Bearwood in the mid-19th century

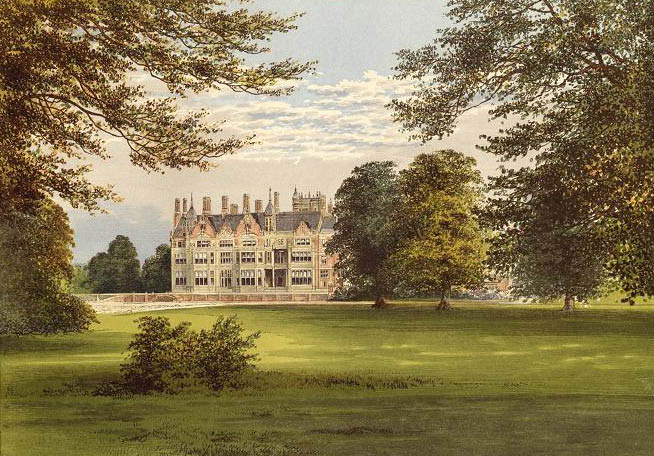
View of Bear Wood in Francis Orpen Morris's The County Seats of the Noblemen and Gentlemen of Great Britain and Ireland (1868)

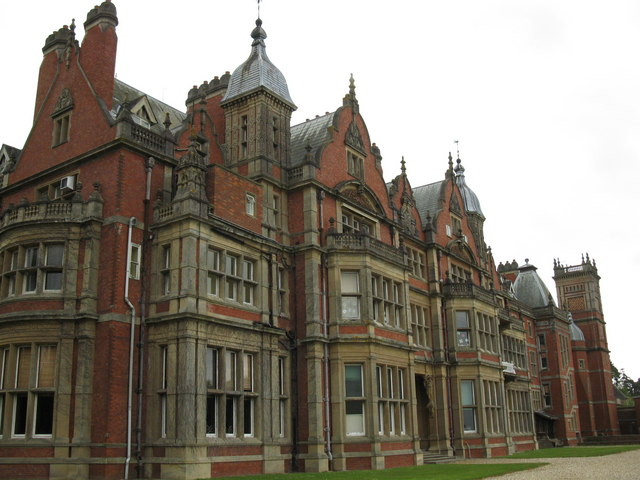
The garden front

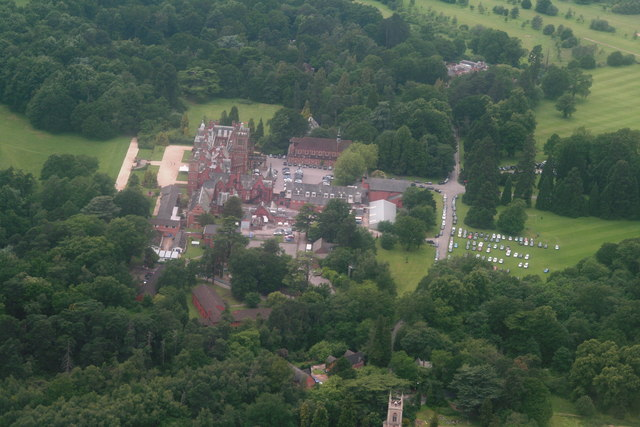
Aerial view

== See also ==
- Grade II* listed buildings in Berkshire

== Sources ==
- Girouard, Mark (1979). The Victorian Country House. New Haven, US: Yale University Press. ISBN 9780300023909. "The Victorian Country House."
- Hall, Michael (2009). The Victorian Country House. London, UK: Aurum Press. ISBN 978-1-84513-457-0.
- Kerr, Robert (2012) [1864]. The Gentleman's House. Cambridge: Cambridge University Press. ISBN 978-1-108-04484-4.
- Pevsner, Nikolaus (2002) [1966]. Berkshire. The Buildings Of England. Yale University Press. ISBN 978-0-300-09582-1. OCLC 813345384.
- Thompson, J. Lee (2000). Northcliffe – Press Baron in Politics, 1865–1922. London: John Murray. ISBN 978-0-7195-5725-5.
- Tyack, Geoffrey; Bradley, Simon; Pevsner, Nikolaus (2010). Berkshire. The Buildings Of England. Yale University Press. ISBN 978-0-300-12662-4.
