= Robert Kerr (architect) =

British architect (1823–1904)

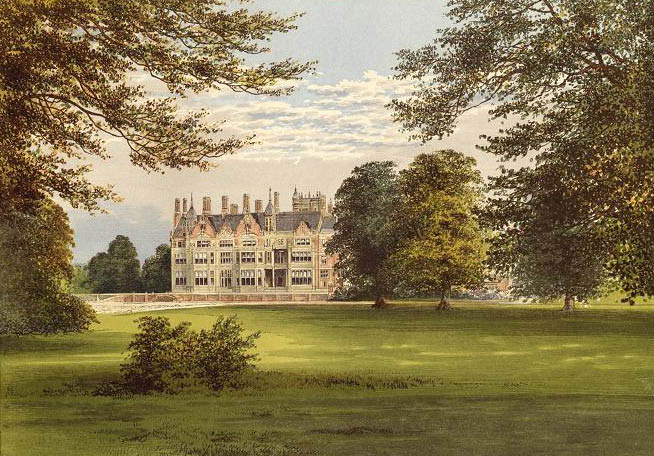
BearWood House, 1865–1874, by Robert Kerr

Robert Kerr (Aberdeen 17 January 1823 – 21 October 1904) was a British architect, architectural writer and co-founder of the Architectural Association.

== Biography ==
Kerr was born in Aberdeen, where he trained as an architect. In 1844, he moved to London and in 1845 spent a year in New York City, from where he returned to London with a rebellious spirit.

Together with the only 18 year old Charles Gray, in 1847 Kerr was a founder of the Architectural Association (AA), becoming its first President, 1847–48. The aim of the AA was to offer an alternative for the education of architects through a systematic course of training provided by the students themselves, rather than having to settle with the existing highly unreliable custom where young men were articled to established architects.

Kerr had been elected a Fellow of the Royal Institute of British Architects (RIBA) in 1857, where he served as an examiner and as a council member. Between 1860–1902, Kerr was District Surveyor for the parish of St James's, Westminster, and 1861–90 Professor of the Arts of Construction at King's College London.

In 1848 Kerr married Charlotte Mary Anne Fox. They had nine children. Three of their four sons went on to be architects. Their daughter, Harriet Kerr, became a suffragette as a response to her father's prejudice against women.

== Buildings ==
Favouring a mixture of architectural styles, which he called "latitudinarian", Kerr's main buildings were English country houses, and included Dunsdale (Westerham, Kent, for Joseph Kitchin, 1863; destroyed), Ascot Heath House (Ascot, Berkshire, 1868; destroyed) and Ford House (then in Lingfield, Surrey, 1862; now Greathed Manor). Great Down (for T M Kitchin, perhaps related to Joseph Kitchin of Dunsdale) on the Hog's Back in Surrey (now demolished) has also been attributed to him on stylistic grounds.

The most ambitious, and indeed one of the largest Victorian country houses, was Bearwood House near Wokingham, Berkshire, built 1865–74 for the owner of The Times newspaper, John Walter. Nikolaus Pevsner describes it as "the climax [of country mansions], and in its brazen way one of the major Victorian monuments of England" and "as far as scale is concerned, and the disregard for what we pygmies would call domestic comfort, Bear Wood is indeed nearer to Blenheim than to our poky villas"

Kerr's principal commercial building was the headquarters of the National Provident Institution (48 Gracechurch Street, City of London, 1862; destroyed) built in an Italianate style.

Illustrated examples:

- Congregational Church, Forest Gate, 1856 (destroyed).
- National Provident Institution: illustration and description in The Building News, 24 October 1862, and The Builder, 3 January 1863.
- Dunsdale: postcard photograph of 1916; illustration and description from The Builder, 20 June 1863.
- Greathed Manor, illustrated sales brochure.
- Competition design for the Reichstag (German Parliament), Berlin, 1872/73, as published in The Architect, 31 May 1873.
- Great Down photograph of 1906

== Publications ==
He was a prolific writer as well as lecturer on architectural subjects. Geoffrey Tyack describes his book The Gentleman’s House, or, How to plan English residences, from the parsonage to the palace (1864) as "the most lucid and encyclopaedic account available of mid-Victorian domestic planning". Kerr was also the editor of the third edition of James Fergusson's History of the modern styles of architecture (London 1891) which he expanded.

=== Books ===
- The Newleafe discourses on the fine art architecture, London 1846
- The gentleman's house; or, How to plan English residences from the parsonage to the palace, London 1864 (3rd expanded edition 1871)
- On Ancient Lights: And the Evidence of Surveyors Thereon : With Tables for the Measurement of Obstructions, London 1865
- A small country house, London 1873
- The consulting architect, London 1886

=== Articles (selection) ===
- The battle of the styles, in: The Builder 18:1860, 292–294
- On the problem of providing dwellings for the poor in towns, in: RIBA transactions 17:1866/67, 37–80
- A development of the theory of the architecturesque, in: RIBA transactions 19:1868/69, 89–103
- The late Mr Beresford-Hope and the Gothic revival, in: RIBA proceedings 4:1888(11)219-220
- Ruskin and emotional architecture, in: RIBA journal 7:1900, 181–188

== List of Works ==
- Ascot Heath House, Ascot, Berkshire (1868, now demolished)
- Bearwood House, Sindlesham, Berkshire (1865–74, built for John Walter
- National Provident Institution Headquarters, City of London, Greater London (1862, now demolished)
- Dunsdale House, Westerham, Kent (1863, now demolished)
- St. Andrew's Church, Framingham Pigot, Norfolk
- Great Down, Farnham, Surrey (now demolished)
- Ford House, Lingfield, Surrey (1862)
