= Dutton (name) =

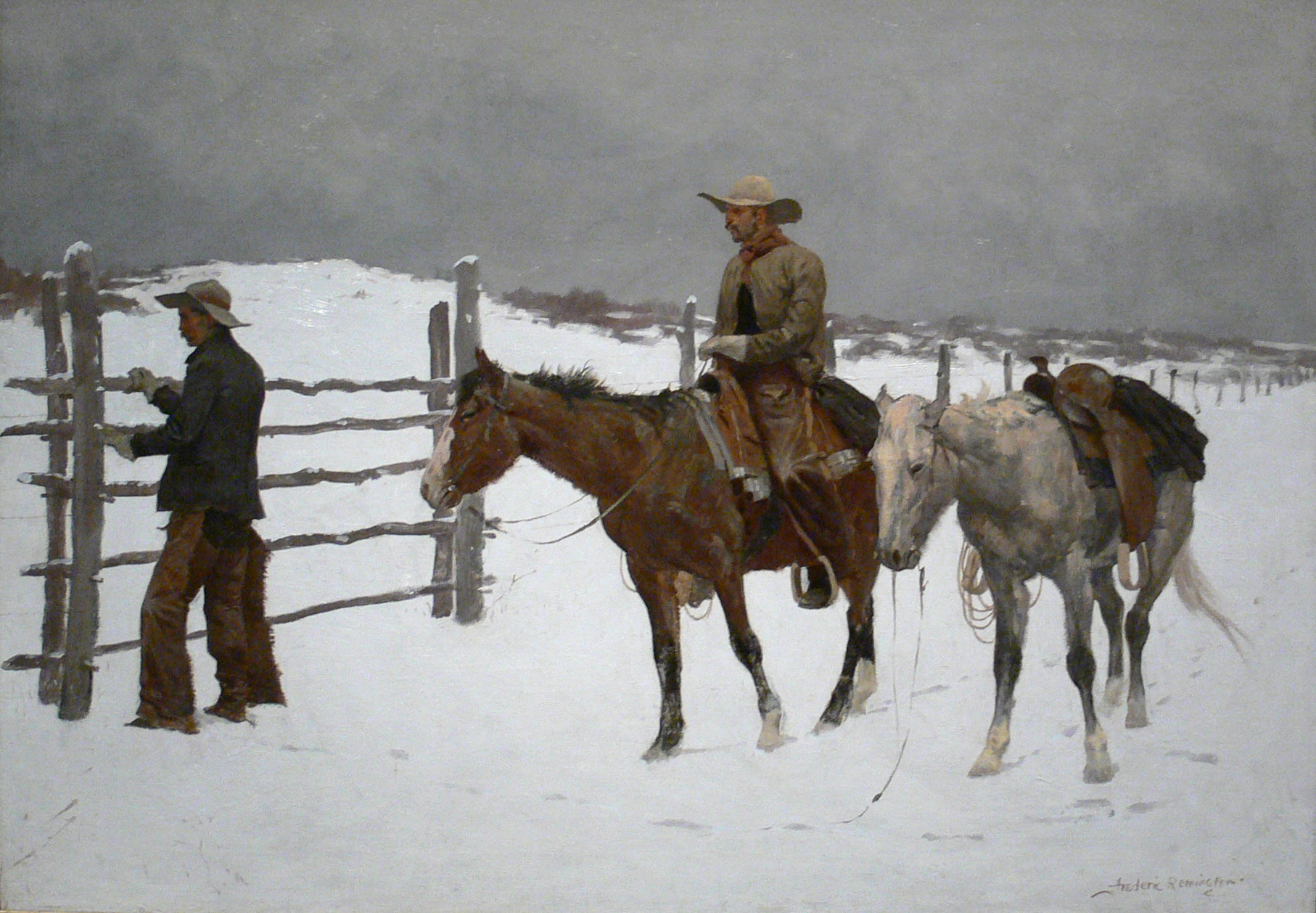
- The Fall of the Cowboy, an 1895 painting by Frederic Remington. The name Dutton evokes cowboys and the American frontier.
- Gender: Primarily masculine
- Language: English

Origin
- Meaning: Dudda's town or hill town

Dutton is an English surname and given name derived from a place name in England. It might ultimately be derived from a combination of the Old English name Dudda, a nickname that might have been given to a man who was fat, and town or from Old English words meaning hill town.

== Usage ==
It debuted among the 1,000 most popular names for newborn American boys in 2022. Some 291 American boys were given the name in 2022. The name debuted on the United States popularity chart in 835th position for boys. It peaked in 2023, when it rose to 724th position on the list of most popular names for American boys. There were 365 boys born that year given the name. In 2024, 351 American newborn boys were given the name and in 2025 there were 327 American boys given the name. Sixteen newborn American girls received the name in 2022. Thirteen American girls were given the name in 2023. Nine American newborn girls were given the name in 2024. Fewer than five American girls were given the name in 2025.

The increase in usage of the name was inspired by the popularity of the television series Yellowstone that aired from 2018 to 2024. The show was set in modern-day Montana, while its spinoffs, 1883 and 1923, were about ancestors of the family. For some new parents, the name evokes imagery of cowboys and the Wild West.

== People with the given name ==
- Dutton Peterson (1894–1964), New York clergyman and politician
- George Dutton Rand (1833–1910), American architect

== People with the surname ==
- Brian Dutton (born 1985), English footballer
- Charles Dutton (disambiguation), several people
- Clarence Dutton (1841–1912), American geologist and US Army officer
- Denis Dutton (1944–2010), philosopher
- Edward Dutton (disambiguation), several people
- Emily Dutton (1884–1962), musician, pastoralist and socialite of South Australia, wife of Henry Hampden Dutton
- Francis Dutton (1818–1877), Premier of South Australia
- Frank Dutton, South African policeman
- Frederick Hansborough Dutton (1812–1890), South Australian pastoralist and politician
- Geoffrey Piers Henry Dutton (1922–1998), South Australian poet, author, and historian
- George Dutton (disambiguation)
- Hampden Dutton or W. H. Dutton, (1805–1849), pastoralist in New South Wales and South Australia
- Henry Dutton (disambiguation), several people
- James Dutton (disambiguation), several people
- John Dutton (disambiguation), several people
- Joseph Dutton, American Servant of God and worker with lepers
- Kevin Dutton (born 1967), British psychologist and writer, specialising in psychopathy
- Lawrence Dutton (born 1954), American violinist
- Paul Dutton (1943–2025), Canadian poet, novelist, essayist, and oral sound artist
- Paul Dutton (cricketer) (born 1965), English cricketer
- Peter Dutton (born 1970), Australian politician
- Phillip Dutton (born 1963), Olympic gold medal equestrian rider
- Sir Piers Dutton (died 1545), English knight
- Ray Dutton (born 1945), British rugby league footballer
- Red Dutton (1898–1987), former NHL President
- Reginald J. G. Dutton (1886–1970), English inventor of Dutton Speedwords
- Robert Dutton (disambiguation), several people
- Rollin Josiah Dutton (1884–1955), American businessman and politician
- Simon Dutton (born 1958), British actor
- Simon Dutton (cricketer) (born 1964), English cricketer
- Thomas Dutton (disambiguation), several people named Thomas or Tom Dutton
- Tim Dutton (born 1964), British actor
- Valerie Dutton (also known as Valerie Hollister; born 1939), American painter
- William Dutton (captain) (1811–1878), "William Pelham Dutton", whaler and settler of Portland, Victoria
- Zachary Dutton, American physicist
