= Lodge Park and Sherborne Estate =

Historic deer course and grandstand in Gloucestershire, England

Lodge Park
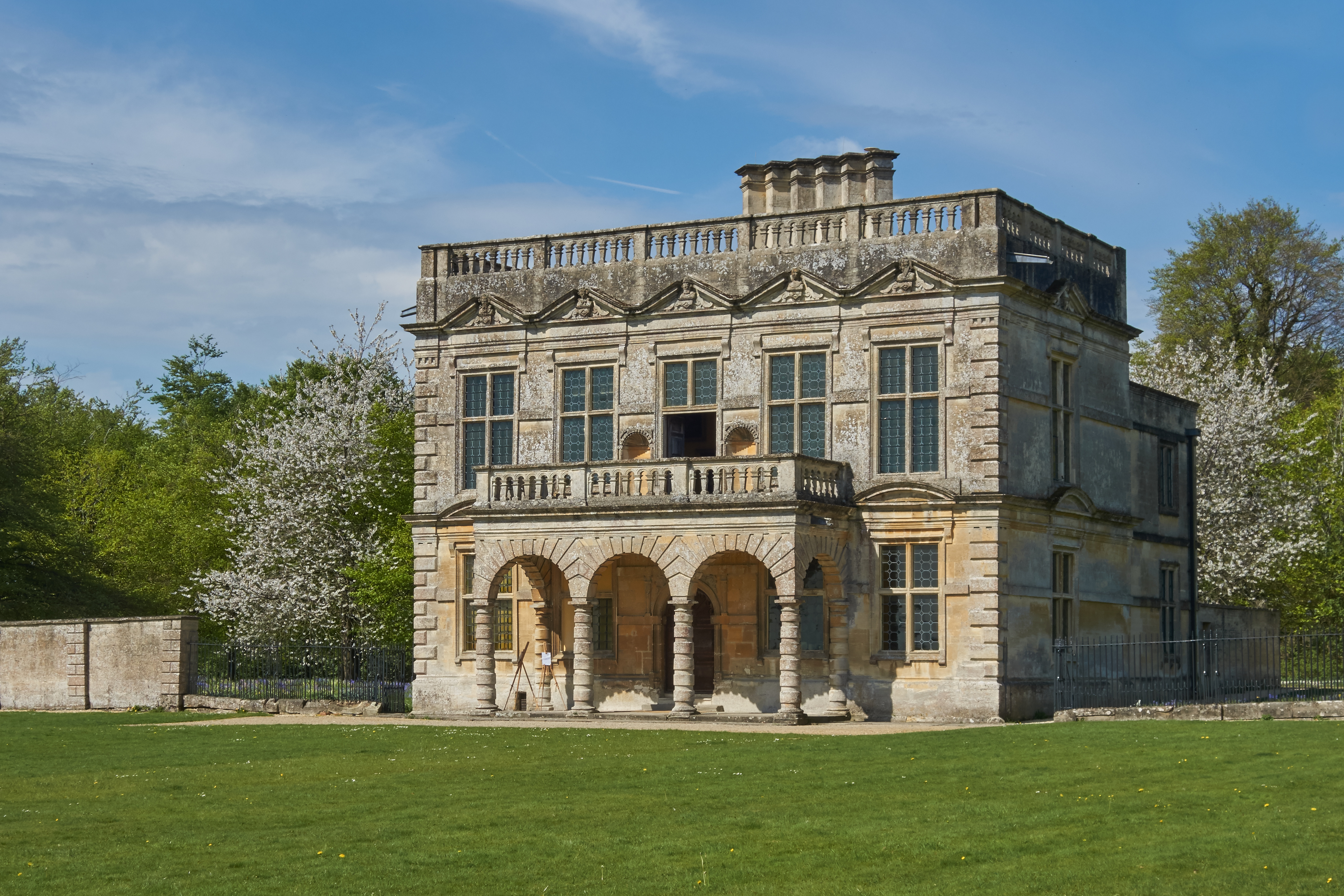
- Lodge Park from the east

- Location in Gloucestershire
- 51°48′32″N 1°47′25″W
- Location: Gloucestershire, England
- OS grid reference: SP 146 123

History
- Built: 1630s
- Built for: John 'Crump' Dutton

Site notes
- Restored by: National Trust
- Governing body: National Trust

Listed Building – Grade I
- Official name: Lodge Park and adjoining walls and railings
- Designated: 23 January 1952

Lodge Park was built as a grandstand in the Sherborne Estate near the villages of Sherborne, Aldsworth and Northleach in Gloucestershire, England. The site is owned by the National Trust and the former grandstand is recorded in the National Heritage List for England as a designated Grade I listed building. It is England's only surviving 17th-century deer course and grandstand.

In the 19th century Lodge Park was modified into a house, then a row of cottages, and then into a house again. It was bequeathed to the National Trust in 1982, and restored to its original form as a grandstand. Lodge Park is open to the public at advertised times, and the footpaths in the Sherborne Estate are available to the public at all times.

== Lodge Park ==
=== History ===
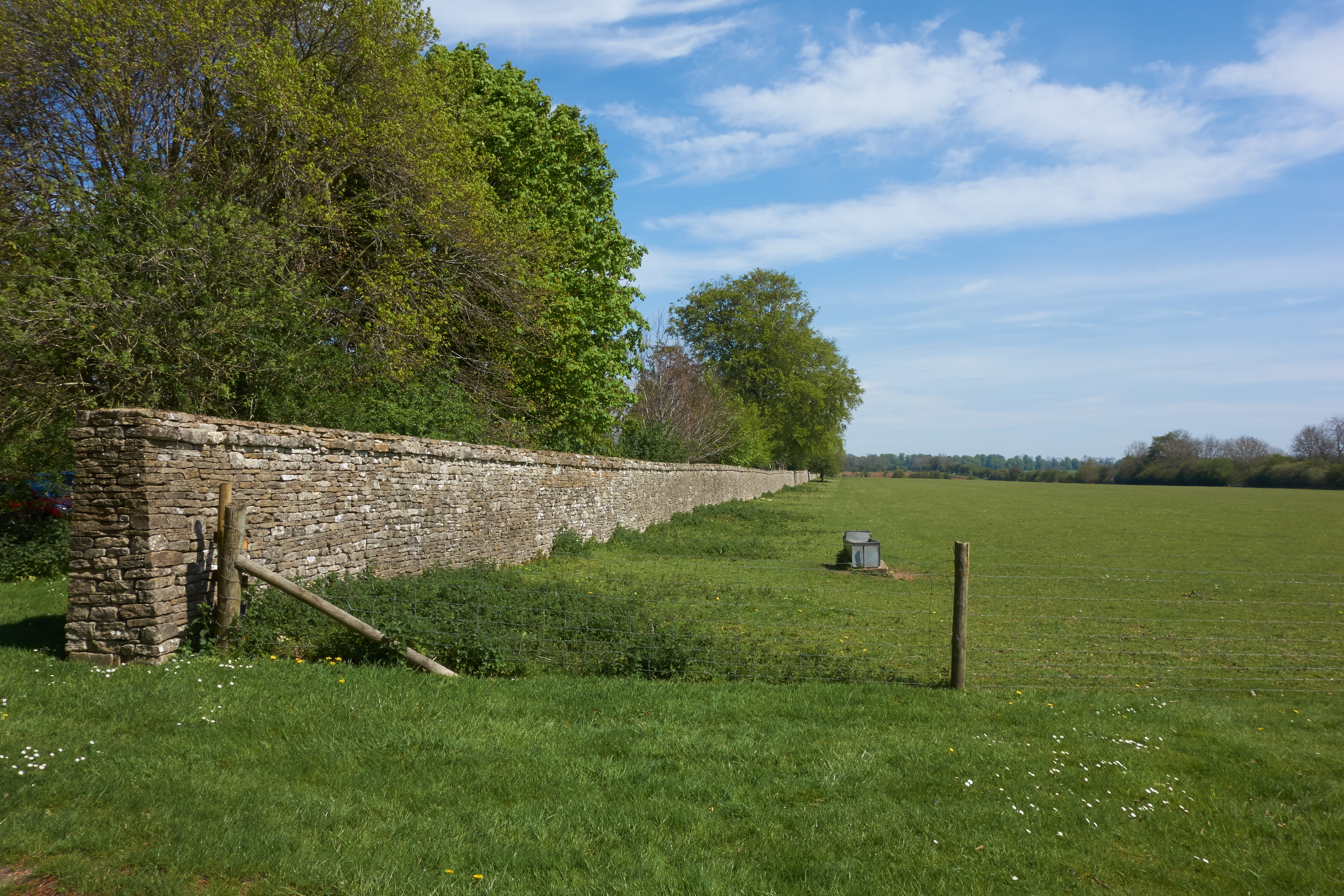
View east down the deer coursing enclosure

In the early 1630s John 'Crump' Dutton created a deer course on his Sherborne Estate; this consisted of a park for containing the deer, a mile-long walled enclosure for the chase, and, overlooking the finish, a grandstand. His grandfather, Thomas Dutton, was descended from the Dutton family of Dutton, Cheshire, and had bought the manor of Sherborne in 1551. As originally constructed, the grandstand consisted of two storeys with a flat roof and a basement. At the entrance was a portico with a balcony, and the basement contained the kitchens. At the back of the building was a range containing the staircases linking the floors. The ground floor was the entrance hall for welcoming guests, and the first floor consisted of the Great Room where the guests were entertained. The deer coursing could be observed from the flat roof or from the balcony over the portico.

During the 1720s the building was remodelled and refurnished by Sir John Dutton, 2nd Baronet. New stone floors were added, a new plasterwork ceiling was added to the Great Room, and new furniture was designed. Dutton employed Charles Bridgeman to redesign the landscaping. Jeffrey Haworth is of the opinion that the new interiors and some of the furniture was designed by William Kent.

There were then few changes until the early 19th century when the building was modified to make it into a house. The staircase range and the chimney piece from the Great Room were removed; the latter was incorporated in the rebuilding of Sherborne House to the design of Lewis Wyatt. The removal of the staircase range adversely affected the stability of the house. A pitched roof was installed in place of the original flat roof, lowering the ceiling of the former Great Room. In the middle of the 19th century the interior of the building was gutted and it was converted into a row of cottages; this further impaired the stability of the building.

Between 1898 and 1902 the building was converted into a dower house for Emily, the wife of Edward Dutton, 4th Baron Sherborne. The rear wing was rebuilt in a different form. The first floor was made into a bedroom with an en suite bathroom. The dining room was on the ground floor, with a lounge and a staircase in the newly built rear wing; the staircase led to a drawing room on the first floor. However Lady Sherborne died in 1905 before her husband, and it is unlikely that she ever occupied the house. Further alterations were made in 1938, when the house was tenanted, and again in the 1950s, when Charles Dutton, 7th Baron Sherborne, and his wife moved into the house. Charles died in 1982 and bequeathed the house and the estate to the National Trust.

=== Restoration ===
When the National Trust acquired the property the house was in a poor condition; the external walls were moving and the chimney stacks were collapsing. The interior consisted of "a jumble of small-scale modern rooms and corridors". Howard Colvin had discovered a 1634 description of the building. Further information was found in the Sherborne Archive in the Gloucester Record Office. Essential repairs were carried out, and archaeological investigations revealed more evidence about the building's original form and its subsequent alterations. It was decided to restore the building to a condition close to its original form.

=== Architecture ===
As Clive Aslet states, the building "is bursting with architecture". A description written in 1634 suggests that the design was inspired by Inigo Jones' Banqueting House in Whitehall, London. At one time it was thought that it had been designed by Jones, but this is incorrect. The citation in Images of England states that it was probably designed by John Webb and built by Valentine Strong of Taynton.

==== Exterior ====
The building is constructed in ashlar stone, with rusticated quoins and a moulded plinth. Its main part has a rectangular plan in two storeys, with a flat lead roof and an extension to the rear. The east face forms the entrance front. It is symmetrical in five bays with a protruding three-bay single-storey portico. The portico has three round arches on columns and is surmounted by a balustrade. The central doorway has a round arch and on each side are two mullioned and transomed windows. On the first floor is a central doorway with a mullioned window above and arched niches in each side. The other bays contain mullioned and transomed windows. There are string courses between the storeys and over the upper storey. Over the lateral two windows on the ground floor are curved tympani, and over each bay in the upper storey is a broken tympanum. Each of these tympani contains a sculpted human head. A balustrade runs around the top of the roof, and at its rear are six joined chimneys.

==== Interior ====
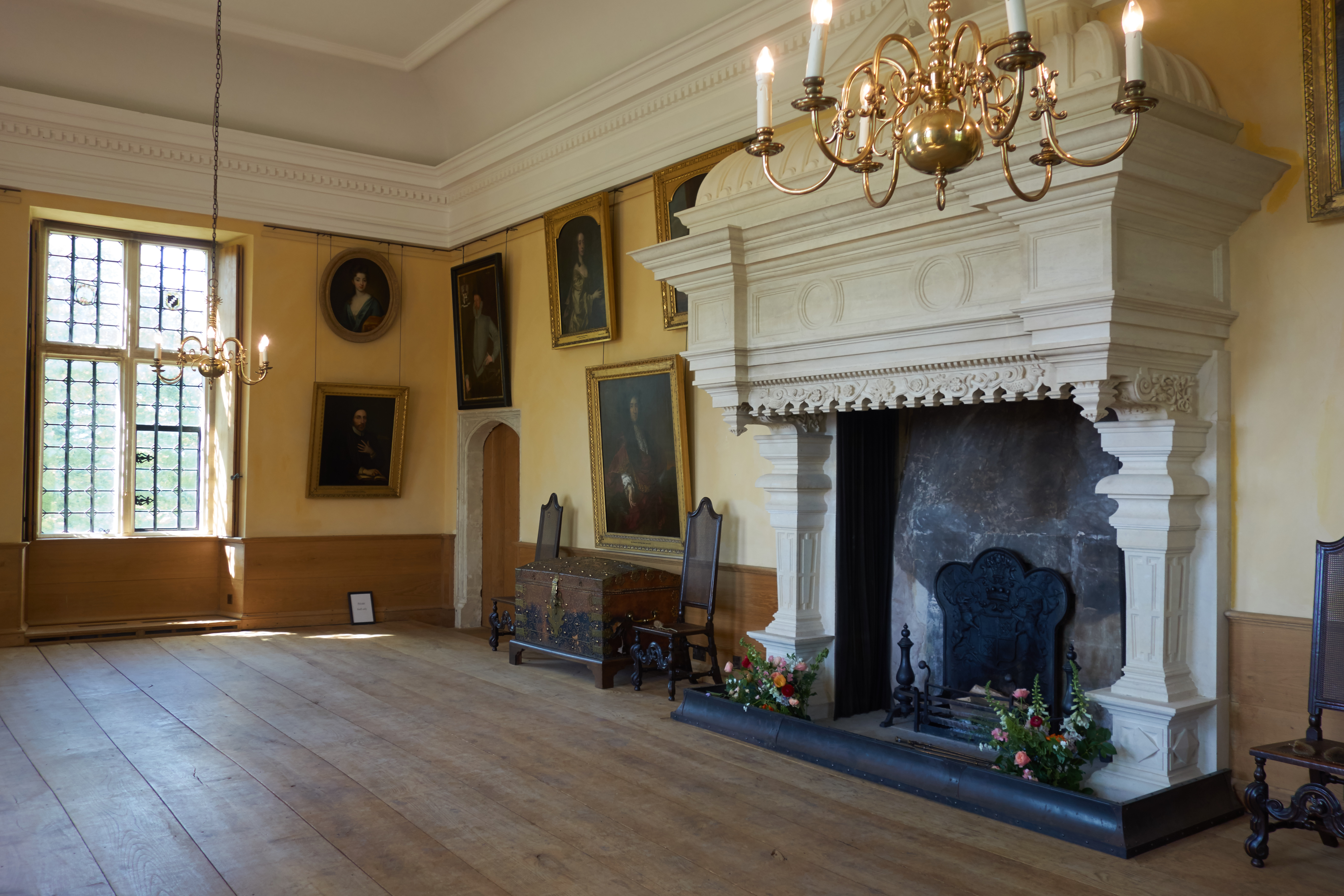
Great Room interior

The entrance hall contains two original arches. One of these includes a fireplace, the other leads to the staircase. The National Trust has inserted a panelled wall on the left. The staircase has been rebuilt by the National Trust in a stairwell measuring 18 feet (5 m) by 18 feet (5 m), and its oak balusters have been copied from those at Cornbury Park in Oxfordshire.

The Great Room on the first floor has been restored in an attempt to link with its original design, including its classical ordering with a dado, pilasters and entablature. The walls would have been hung with tapestry, but this has been replaced with family portraits that originally hung in Sherborne House. The floor has been reconstructed, using chestnut boards measuring 49 feet (15 m) from the Welsh borders. The chimneypiece has been reconstructed by masons from the Hereford Cathedral workshop.

=== Associated structures ===
Three structures associated with the Lodge Park have been designated as Grade II listed buildings by Historic England. About 10 metres (33 ft) to the south of building is a pair of gates with piers that date from the mid-18th century or earlier. The gates are constructed in cast iron and the piers are in limestone. The piers consist of hammer-dressed quoins up to the level of the top of the gates; on the top of each is a large stone block surmounted by a triangular pedimented capping stone. Some 40 metres (131 ft) to the east is a fountain probably dating from 1898. This consists of a circular stone surround with four urns, one at each cardinal point. In the centre is the fountain, also in the form of an urn, but larger than those on the surround. Further to the east, some 120 metres (394 ft) from the building, is a pair of limestone lodges with adjoining walls, gate piers and gates also dating from about 1898.

=== Parkland ===
To the west of Park Lodge is an area of parkland of 115 hectares. This was landscaped to a design by Charles Bridgeman from the mid-1720s for Sir John Dutton. It is registered by Historic England as Grade I. The park contained a series of "rooms" (presumably for herding deer), a Great Avenue, and a former canal. Bridgeman's proposal for a serpentine canal was not carried through.

In the parkland there is a long barrow at map reference SP1426712550, with a capstone and two upright stones visible at the south-eastern end.

== Sherborne Estate ==
The estate is open to the public. It contains wild animals including fallow and roe deer, badgers and foxes. There are a number of footpaths and walks in the estate, including a sculpture trail; some of these start from Ewe Pen Barn (grid reference SP158143). On the estate are water-meadows, including draining channels and sluices (grid reference SP175154).

The estate was the venue for the BBC Two wildlife television programmes Springwatch and Autumnwatch in 2017, followed by Winterwatch in January 2018.

== Present day ==
Lodge Park is open to the public at advertised times and has a small shop and provides light refreshments. The building is available for weddings. The Sherborne Estate is open all year.
