= Ralph Dutton =

Ralph Dutton may refer to:

- Ralph Dutton (Conservative politician) (1821–1892), British member of parliament for Hampshire South, and for Cirencester
- Ralph Dutton, 8th Baron Sherborne (1898–1985), on his death left his house and gardens to the National Trust
- Sir Ralph Dutton, 1st Baronet (c. 1645–1721), MP for Gloucestershire

== See also ==
- Dutton (disambiguation)
