= Arthur Brandreth Scott Dutton =

British Royal Navy officer

Vice-Admiral The Honourable Arthur Brandreth Scott Dutton CB CMG
- Born: 11 September 1876; Simla, British India
- Died: 29 September 1932 (aged 56)
- Occupation: British Royal Navy vice-admiral
- Spouse: Doriel Hay (m. 1914; died 1932)
- Relatives: James Dutton, 6th Baron Sherborne (brother); James Henry Legge Dutton, 3rd Baron Sherborne (grandfather)

Vice-Admiral the Honourable Arthur Brandreth Scott Dutton, CB, CMG (11 September 1876 – 29 September 1932) was a Royal Navy officer who served during World War I, and was Captain-Superintendent of Pembroke Dockyard from 1922 to 1924.

== Early life ==
Dutton was born on 11 September 1876 in Simla, the summer capital of British India, where his father was Aide-de-camp to Frederick Roberts, Commander-in-Chief, India. He was a younger son of May Arbuthnot Taylor (1849–1943) and Col. Hon. Charles Dutton (1842–1909), a younger son of James Henry Legge Dutton, 3rd Baron Sherborne. Arthur's older brother, James Dutton (1873–1949), succeeded as Baron Sherborne in 1920, allowing his siblings to use the style the Honourable. His sister Hon. Mabel Honor Dutton was married to Sir George James Robert Clerk of Penicuik, 9th Baronet.

== Naval career ==
Dutton was commissioned in the Royal Navy, where he was promoted to lieutenant in 1898. He was appointed to command of the torpedo boat destroyer HMS Locust in April 1902, while she was serving in the Mediterranean. He participated in the Battle of Jutland, the greatest naval battle of World War I. In April 1922 he was appointed Captain-Superintendent of Pembroke Dockyard, serving as such until 1924. He was appointed a Naval ADC to King George in 1926, and promoted to rear-admiral later the same year. From 1928 until 1931 he was Commanding Destroyer Flotillas in the Mediterranean Fleet. He retired from the navy as vice-admiral in 1931.

== Personal life ==
On 12 February 1914, Dutton was married to Doriel Hay (c. 1889–1941), a daughter of Sir John Hay, 9th Baronet and Anne Milliken-Napier (a daughter of Sir Robert Milliken-Napier, 9th Baronet). Together, they were the parents of:

- Doriel Rowena Dutton, who married W/Cdr. Ian Norman Bayles, son of Norman Bayles, in 1940.
- Julia Meliora Dutton (1914–2004), who married S/Ldr. Norrie Bertram Salisbury Butler, son of Charles William Butler, in 1939.

Dutton died on 29 September 1932.

Preceded by Captain David Murray Anderson	Captain-Superintendent of Pembroke Royal Dockyard; 1922–24	Succeeded by Captain Leonard Andrew Boyd Donaldson
