= Baron Sherborne =

Barony in the Peerage of Great Britain

Escutcheon of the Barons Sherborne

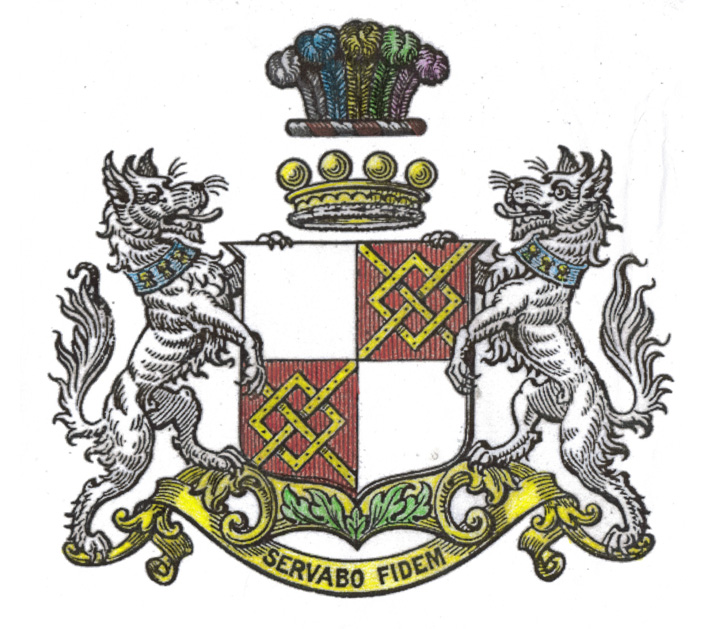
Heraldic achievement of the Barons Sherborne, crest: A plume of five ostrich feathers respectively argent azure or vert and gules; supporters: On either side a wolf proper collared gules charged with three garbs or

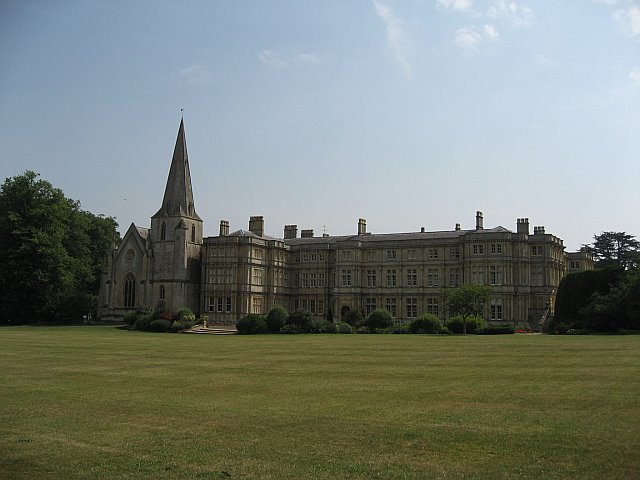
Sherborne House, seat of the Dutton family

Lord Sherborne, Baron of Sherborne, in the County of Gloucester, was a title in the Peerage of Great Britain. It was created in 1784 for James Dutton, who had earlier represented Gloucestershire in Parliament. He was the son of James Dutton (originally James Naper) by Anne Dutton, daughter of Sir Ralph Dutton, 1st Baronet (see Dutton baronets). His father had assumed the surname of Dutton in lieu of his patronymic on succeeding to the Dutton estates in 1743. The title became extinct upon the death of the eighth Baron in 1985.

The Honourable Ralph Dutton, youngest son of the second Baron, was Member of Parliament for Hampshire South and Cirencester.

The hereditary Earl of Sherbourne was Lord John Marbury (portrayed by Roger Rees) on the American TV series The West Wing.

== History of Sherborne ==
The ancestral seat of the Dutton family was Sherborne, Gloucestershire. In 1883 the Dutton estate consisted of: 3rd Baron Sherborne, 15773 acres in Gloucestershire (including the townships of Bibury, Windrush, Standish and Sherborne) and 150 acres in Hampshire; the Hon. John Thomas Dutton of Hinton Ampner (brother), 5124 acres in Hampshire; the Hon. Ralph Heneage Dutton of Tisbury Manor (brother), 3470 acres in Hampshire and 1280 acres in Somerset [the Wootton Courtenay estate]. The remaining estate of more than 4,000 acres (16 km^{2}) passed to the National Trust after the 7th Baron's death. In particular, Ralph Stawell Dutton, the 8th Baron, created the gardens at Hinton Ampner in Hampshire.

Thomas Dutton, acquired the manor of Sherborne in 1551 from Sir Christopher Alleyn. In 1574 and again in 1592 Thomas Dutton entertained Queen Elizabeth I at Sherborne, each time for six days. In 1657, at the death of John Dutton of Sherborne he was pronounced "... a learned and prudent man; and as one of the richest so one of the meekest men in England." In 1743 Sir John Dutton, (2nd) Baronet of Sherborne, the last in the Dutton male line at Sherborne, died. The Sherborne estate devolved to his sister Anne's son, James Lenox Naper (1712–1776), who changed his surname to Dutton in order to inherit. Thus, the Barons Sherborne are members of Clan Napier through their notable patrilineal ancestor, Sir Robert Napier, an eminent lawyer and Lord Chief Baron of the Exchequer in Ireland.

Sherborne's contribution to the world of thoroughbred horse racing was also important due to the close horse-breeding ties between Sir John Dutton and the Earl of Godolphin who owned Godolphin Arabian. A number of exchanges and transactions regarding mares and foals took place between them. After Sir John's death in 1743, the horse breeding connection with Godolphin was continued by Sir John's brother-in-law James Naper, and his son James Lenox Dutton. The first Baron Sherborne continued the tradition of his father and grandfather. He bred the foundation sire, Baronet, grandson of Eclipse, later owned by the Prince of Wales (later George IV) who won every race he entered in 1791.

== Barons Sherborne (1784) ==
- James Dutton, 1st Baron Sherborne (1744–1820)
- John Baron Dutton, 2nd Baron Sherborne (1779–1862)
- James Henry Legge Dutton, 3rd Baron Sherborne (1804–1883)
- Edward Lenox Dutton, 4th Baron Sherborne (1831–1919)
- Frederick George Dutton, 5th Baron Sherborne (1840–1920)
- James Huntly Dutton, 6th Baron Sherborne (1873–1949)
- Charles Dutton, 7th Baron Sherborne (1911–1982)
- Ralph Stawell Dutton, 8th Baron Sherborne (1898–1985)

== See also ==
- Dutton baronets
