= John Dutton =

John Dutton may refer to:

- John Dutton (politician) (1594–1657), English MP
- John Dutton (quarterback) (born 1975), American football player
- John Dutton (defensive lineman) (born 1951), former National Football League defensive lineman
- John Dutton (trade unionist) (1907/8–1985), British trade union leader
- Sir John Dutton, 2nd Baronet (1684–1743), MP for Gloucestershire
- John Dutton, 2nd Baron Sherborne (1779–1862), British peer
- John Dutton (Yellowstone), a fictional character in the American TV series Yellowstone

== See also ==
- John Dutton Frost (1912–1993), British officer
- Jonathon Dutton (born 1981), Australian actor and director
- Dutton (disambiguation)
