= Angus Holden =

Angus Holden may refer to:

- Angus Holden, 1st Baron Holden (1833–1912), British Liberal MP 1885–1886, 1892–1900
- Angus Holden, 3rd Baron Holden (1898–1951)
