= Frederick Dutton =

Frederick Dutton may refer to:

- Frederick Dutton (Australian politician), pastoralist and politician in the colony of South Australia
- Frederick Dutton, 5th Baron Sherborne, British peer and clergyman
- Fred Dutton (Frederick Gary Dutton), American lawyer and Democratic Party power broker
