= James Dutton =

James Dutton may refer to:

- James Dutton, 1st Baron Sherborne (1744–1820), British peer
- James Dutton, 3rd Baron Sherborne (1804–1883), British peer
- James Dutton, 6th Baron Sherborne (1873–1949), British peer
- James Dutton (actor) (born 1982), English actor
- James Dutton (astronaut) (born 1968), American astronaut
- James Dutton (Royal Marines officer) (born 1954), former Governor of Gibraltar
