= Aldsworth =

Village in Gloucestershire, England

Coordinates: 51.78°N 01.78°W

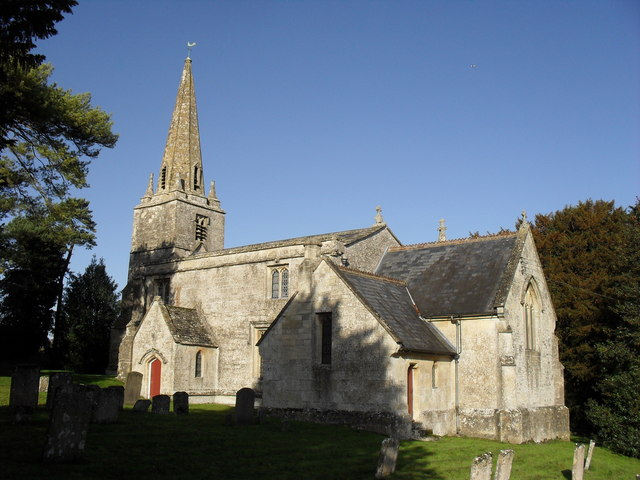
- St Bartholomew's

- Location within Gloucestershire
- Population: 236 (United Kingdom Census 2011)
- OS grid reference: SP1510
- District: Cotswold
- Shire county: Gloucestershire
- Region: South West
- Country: England
- Sovereign state: United Kingdom
- Post town: Cheltenham
- Postcode district: GL54
- Police: Gloucestershire
- Fire: Gloucestershire
- Ambulance: South Western
- UK Parliament: North Cotswolds

Aldsworth is a village and civil parish in the Cotswold district of Gloucestershire, about ten miles north-east of Cirencester. In 2010 its population was 236. Aldsworth is a large parish, slightly north of the River Leach, located in the South West of the United Kingdom.

Situated on elevated land just off the B4425, Aldsworth is an unspoilt village located 3 miles from Bibury, 6 and a half miles from Burford and 6 miles from Northleach. With an average rainfall of 750mm and a growing season estimated at 250 days a year, the land is of moderate quality for agricultural purposes.

It had a population of 3143 according to the 2011 census.

== Name ==
Aldsworth (Aldworth), was recorded in the Domesday Book as Aldesorde, coming from Eald's + worþ, which in Old English means Old Enclosure or Old Farm.

== History ==
At the time of the Domesday book, it had a tenant population of 41.

Prior to the dissolution of the monasteries, it was held by the Abbey of Gloucester.

In the 1870s, Aldsworth was described as:

"A parish in Northleach district, Gloucester; near the river Leach, 10 miles NE of Cirencester r. station. It has a post office under Cheltenham. Acres, 3,460. Real property, £3,107. Pop., 430. Houses, 82. The property is divided among a few. The living is a vicarage in the diocese of Gloucester and Bristol. Value, £66. Patron, Christ's Church, Oxford. The church stands on a hill, and commands an extensive view."

Situated on elevated land just off the B4425, Aldsworth is an unspoilt village located 3 miles from Bibury, 6 and a half miles from Burford and 6 miles from Northleach. With an average rainfall of 750mm and a growing season estimated at 250 days a year, the land is of moderate quality for agricultural purposes. The Saxons made use of good unenclosed sheep pastures in Aldsworth, from which time the land was cultivated in an open field system until 1973.

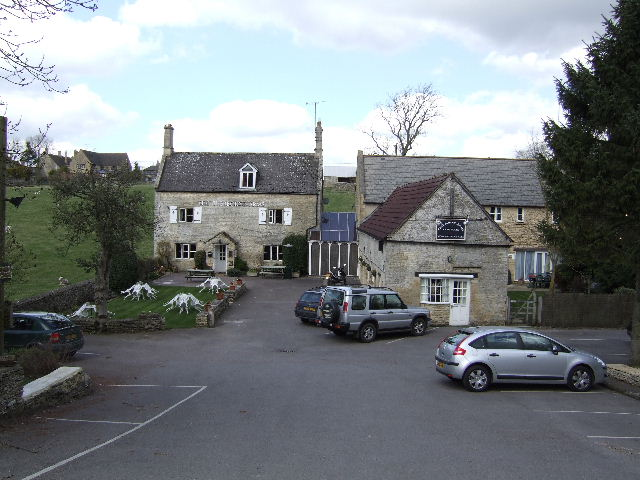
Sherborne Arms, Aldsworth

For hundreds of years, horse racing took place on the downs between Aldsworth and Burford. The village was home to Robert Garne, the last owner of the 'Cotswold Lion' breed of sheep which brought so much wealth and prosperity to the area.

=== 1969 air crash ===
A BAC Jet Provost from RAF Little Rissington crashed on Thursday 4 September 1969. The instructor and pilot ejected

== Governance ==
The village is the most populous area of 'Riversmeet' electoral ward. This ward starts in the north at Sherborne, stretches south through Aldsworth and ends in the south at Southrop. The total population of the ward taken at the 2011 census was 1,766. Aldsworth Parish Council is the level of local government closest to the residents.

== Population ==
The majority of the Aldsworth population are aged between 35 and 54, with fewer aged below 25. There is also a greater amount of households with no dependent children than those with dependent children. According to Census records, the population of Aldsworth was at 288 in 1801 and continued to grow up until it peaked at 386 people in 1881. After this period the population slowly decreased, reaching a low of 230 in 1951. Since then, population levels have been at a steady rate with the majority of the residents being of a retired age or at an agricultural working age.

== The Sherborne Arms ==
The Sherborne Arms has been the village pub since 1799, it is located on the main road between Bibury and Burford. The building is an old 17th Century farmhouse which has been transformed and refurbished for use as a public house. The O'Keefe family have run this local pub since 1984.

== St Bartholomew's Church ==
The Church of St Bartholomew is set on the western outskirts of the village. According to an authoritative source, "The church is remarkable. Typically, it has Norman and Perpendicular elements; but the latter are quite a tour de force". The spire can be seen for miles outside of Aldsworth and is very rare in the Cotswolds. Church services are held on every first and third Sunday at 11am.

A church school was endowed by Lord and Lady Sherborne in the mid 19th century.

== Historical and ancient monuments ==
Celtic Fields covering some 70 acres are visible on the limestone pasture of Bibury old race-course, the whole area is either flat or gently sloping. In the west, the fields which lie south appear to be contemporary, however are remarkably well preserved. Others have been broken or obliterated by ploughing and some of it is marked by low plough-ridges. The fields are surrounded by stony banks, probably collapsed walls, and by lynchets. A track, runs for nearly ½ mile through the fields. The banks are regularly arranged in parallel lines resulting in individual fields.
