= Dutton baronets =

Extinct baronetcy in the Baronetage of England

Arms of Dutton: Quarterly argent and gules, in the second and third quarters a fret or

The Dutton Baronetcy, of Sherborne in the county of Dorset, was a title in the Baronetage of England. It was created on 22 June 1678 for Ralph Dutton, subsequently Member of Parliament for Gloucestershire. His son, the second Baronet, also represented Gloucestershire in Parliament. The title became extinct on his death in 1743.

The late Baronet left his estates to his nephew James Naper, of Loughcrew, County Meath, eldest son of James Naper by Anne Dutton, daughter of Sir Ralph Dutton, 1st Baronet. James Naper assumed by Royal licence the surname of Dutton in lieu of his patronymic in accordance with his uncle's will. His eldest son James Dutton was elevated to the peerage as Baron Sherborne in 1784.

== Dutton baronets, of Sherborne (1678) ==
- Sir Ralph Dutton, 1st Baronet (c. 1645–1720/1)
- Sir John Dutton, 2nd Baronet (1684–1743)

== See also ==
- Baron Sherborne
