= Stewkley baronets =

Extinct baronetcy in the Baronetage of England

The Stewkley (or Stukeley, or Stukely) Baronetcy, of Hinton in the County of Southampton, was a title in the Baronetage of England. It was created on 9 June 1627 for Hugh Stewkley. The title became extinct on the death of the second Baronet in 1719.

== Stewkley baronets, of Hinton (1627) ==
Escutcheon of the Stewkley baronets of Hinton

- Sir Hugh Stewkley, 1st Baronet (c. 1604 – 1642)
- Sir Hugh Stewkley, 2nd Baronet (died 1719)
