= Sherborne House, Gloucestershire =

Sherborne House
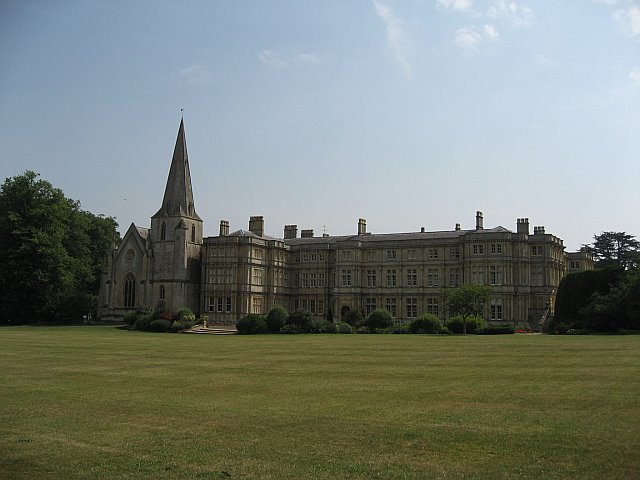
- Sherborne House and the adjacent Church of St Mary Magdalene

- Location in Gloucestershire
- 51°49′51.6″N 01°45′19.44″W
- Location: Sherborne, Gloucestershire, England

Sherborne House is a large house in the village of Sherborne, Gloucestershire, England. It is a former country house that has been converted into flats and has been designated by Historic England as a Grade II* listed building.

The Dutton family owned Sherborne manor from c. 1522. A U-shaped house was built on this site in 1651–3 by Valentine Strong (d.1662) for John Dutton and was rebuilt in 1829–1834 for John Dutton, 2nd Baron Sherborne by Lewis Wyatt. The house, which reproduces the style of the 17th-century building, has a square plan with a central courtyard and a three-storey façade. Interior decoration of the principal rooms was by Anthony Salvin, c. 1841.

The adjoining Church of St Mary Magdalene, with origins in the late 13th century and partly rebuilt in the mid 19th century, is also Grade II* listed.

The gardens, pleasure ground and extensive parkland, begun in the 17th century but much altered, are listed as Grade II on the Register of Historic Parks and Gardens. A deerpark to the southwest, now known as Lodge Park, has a former grandstand from the mid 17th century.

== Recent history ==
From 1947 to 1966 Sherborne House was home to King's School, an independent private boarding school. Mick Fleetwood, of the band Fleetwood Mac, attended the school.

The house was sold by the Dutton family in 1971. In that year John G. Bennett founded the International Academy for Continuous Education. Rock guitarist Robert Fripp (best known for his work with King Crimson) attended its Fifth Course, lasting ten months from October 1975.

The house was converted into flats in 1981, and the estate was bequeathed to the National Trust on the death of Charles Dutton, 7th Baron Sherborne in 1982.

In 2017, the estate became a host site for the BBC Two wildlife programme Springwatch.
