= Sir John Dutton, 2nd Baronet =

Sir John Dutton
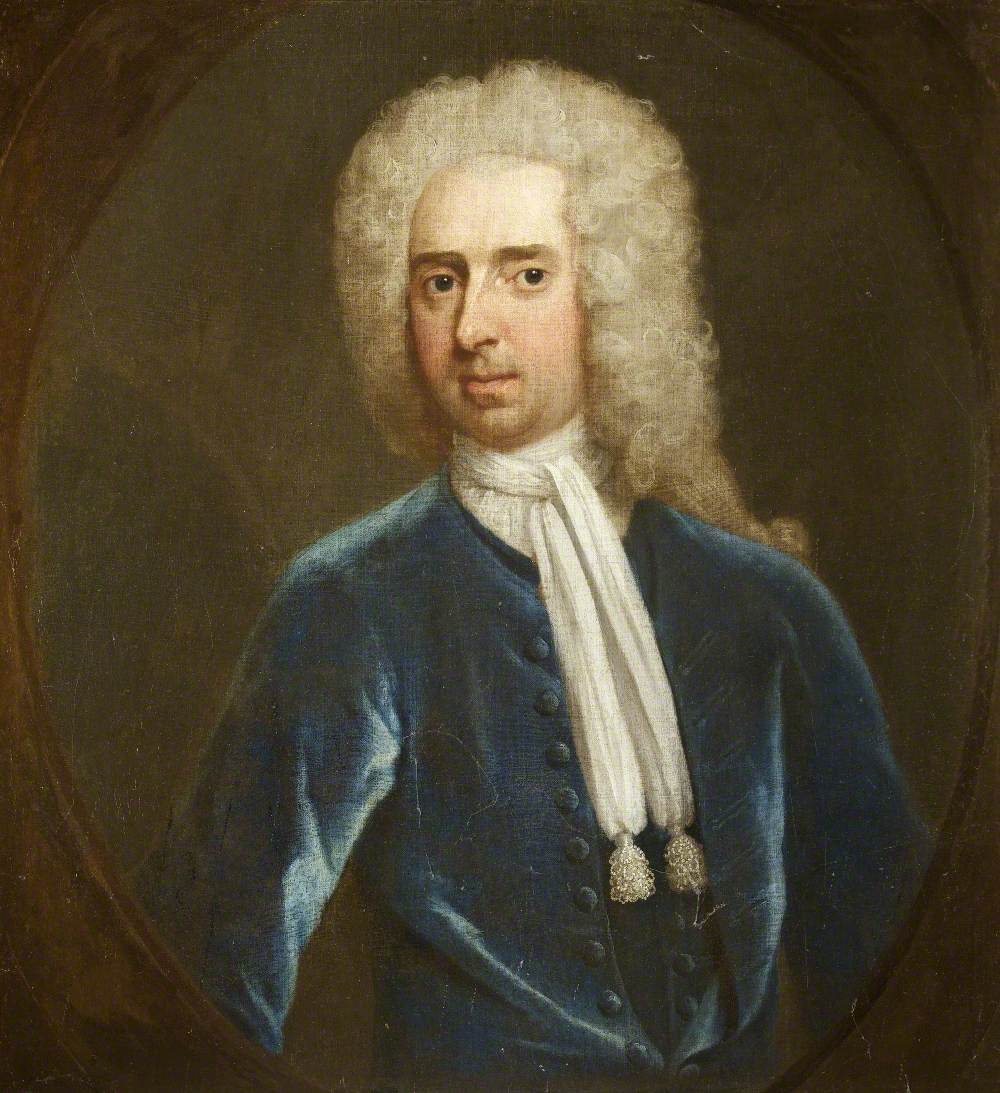
- Portrait of Dutton by Michael Dahl
- Born: 1684
- Died: 1743 (aged 58–59)
- Occupations: Landowner and politician

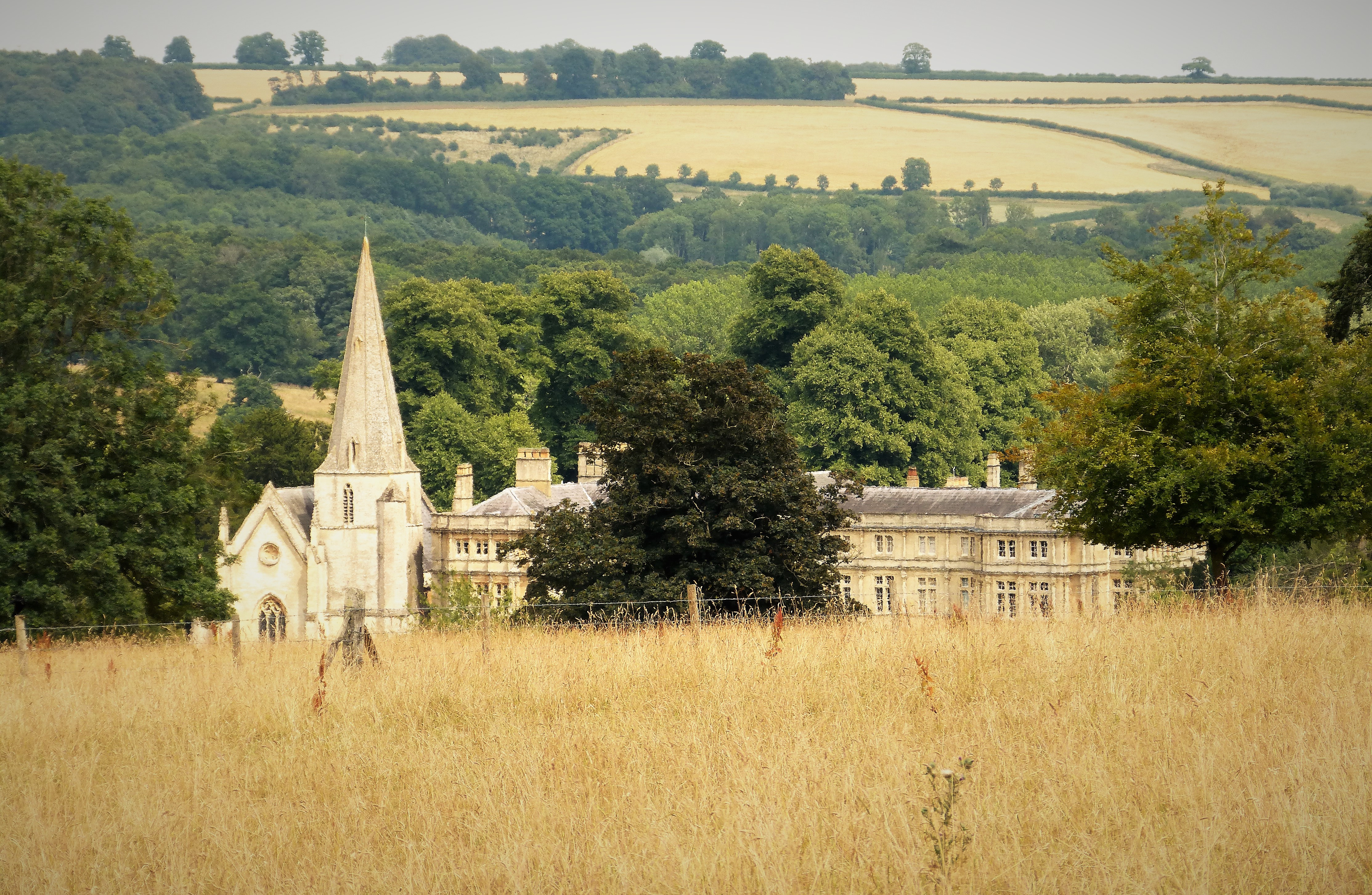
Sherborne House

Sir John Dutton, 2nd Baronet (1684–1743), of Sherborne, Gloucestershire, was a British landowner and politician who sat in the House of Commons from 1727 to 1734.

Dutton was baptized on 2 January 1684, the eldest surviving son of Sir Ralph Dutton, 1st Baronet MP of Sherborne and his second wife Mary Barwick, daughter of Peter Barwick of London, who was physician in ordinary to Charles II. He was admitted at Middle Temple in 1701 at the expense of his grandfather, since his father had wasted away the family fortune. He married under a settlement of 17 June 1714, with £12,500, Mary Cullen, daughter of Sir Rushout Cullen, 3rd Baronet MP. She died in May 1719 and he married secondly (with £20,000) Mary Keck, daughter of Francis Keck of Great Tew, Oxfordshire on 1 June 1728. He succeeded his father in the baronetcy in 1721.

At the 1727 general election, Dutton was returned unopposed as a Whig Member of Parliament for Gloucestershire. He voted against the Administration when present, except on the repeal of the Septennial Act. Before the 1734 general election he agreed to stand on a compromise with the Tories, but withdrew when John Stephens intervened and broke the compromise. He did not stand again, declaring that he was resolved to live quietly and never more to be dragged into public life.

Dutton died in 1743 and was buried at Sherborne at midnight on 4 February 1743. The monument was sculpted by John Michael Rysbrack.

He had two daughters by his second wife and no sons, so the baronetcy became extinct. He left his property to his nephew James Lenox Naper who changed his name to Dutton and was the father of James Dutton, 1st Baron Sherborne, with remainder to his brother-in-law Sir Thomas Reade, 4th Baronet and his brother George Reade.

Arms of Dutton: Quarterly argent and gules, in the second and third quarters a fret or

Parliament of Great Britain
Preceded by Hon. Henry Berkeley; Kinard de la Bere	Member of Parliament for Gloucestershire; 1727–1734; With: Hon. Henry Berkeley	Succeeded by Thomas Chester; Benjamin Bathurst
Baronetage of England
Preceded by Ralph Dutton	Baronet (of Sherborne); 1721-1743	Extinct
