= Church of St Bartholomew, Aldsworth =

Church in Gloucestershire, England

Coordinates: 51.7882°N 1.7783°W

Church of St Bartholomew
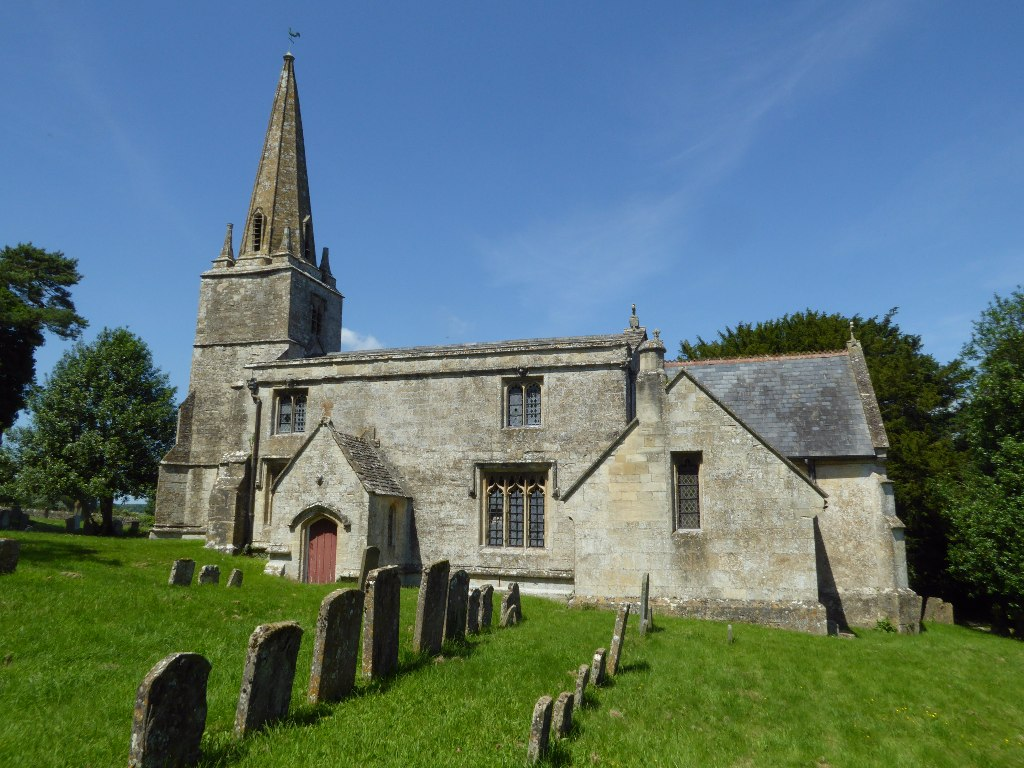

- Denomination: Church of England

Architecture
- Heritage designation: Grade I listed building
- Designated: 26 January 1961

Administration
- Province: Canterbury
- Diocese: Gloucester
- Parish: Aldsworth

The Anglican Church of St Bartholomew at Aldsworth in the Cotswold District of Gloucestershire, England, was built in the late 12th century. It is a grade I listed building.

== History ==
The church was built in the late 12th century. During the 15th century the north aisle was rebuilt. Further rebuilding occurred in the 19th century including the Victorian restoration of the chancel and vestry.

Until 1539 the church belonged to Gloucester Abbey, then it was given to Osney Abbey until its dissolution when St Bartholomews came under Christ Church, Oxford.

The parish is part of the Windrush benefice.

== Architecture ==
The stone building has a slate roof. It consists of a nave, north aisle, south porch, three-bay chancel and vestry with a west tower and spire supported by buttresses. The tower contains three bells hung as a chime.

Most of the interior furnishings are from the 19th century but a 15th-century stained glass window with a Tudor rose survives.
