= Frederick Dutton, 5th Baron Sherborne =

British peer and clergyman

Frederick George Dutton, 5th Baron Sherborne

Arms of Dutton: Quarterly argent and gules, in the second and third quarters a fret or

Frederick George Dutton, 5th Baron Sherborne (28 May 1840 – 2 January 1920), was a British peer and clergyman. He was born in Bibury, and died in Cheltenham, Gloucestershire.

== Background ==
Sherborne was the son of James Dutton, 3rd Baron Sherborne, of Sherborne, Gloucestershire, by his wife, Lady Elizabeth Howard (1803–1845), daughter of Thomas Howard, 16th Earl of Suffolk, and Hon. Elizabeth Jane Dutton.

== Career ==
Barrister, Lincoln's Inn 1867; ordained 1869; Curate, Sonning 1869–70; Vicar of Sherborne 1870–74 and of Bibury 1874–1916; Honorary Canon, Gloucester Cathedral 1901–1920.

== Ornithology ==
A keen ornithologist, he was President of the Avicultural Society from 1895 to 1920. He is best known in the aviary world for the notes he provided for W.T. Greene's book Parrots in Captivity, published in three volumes between 1884 and 1887. At his home in Bibury he had a large collection of parrots. He was also an adjudicator for British and foreign birds, at many exhibitions held at the Crystal Palace in south London. He contributed to issues of the Avicultural Magazine, under the heading "Parrot Notes".

== Family ==
Sherborne never married and died on 2 January 1920, aged 79. He was succeeded in the barony by his nephew, James Dutton, 6th Baron Sherborne, son of Colonel Hon. Charles Dutton (1842–1909), the younger (and by then deceased) brother of Edward and Frederick.

He donated several pieces to the British Museum.

Peerage of Great Britain
Preceded by Edward Lenox Dutton	Baron Sherborne; 1919–1920	Succeeded by James Huntly Dutton
