= Charles Dutton =

Charles Dutton may refer to:

- Charles Dutton (politician) (1834–1904), pastoralist and politician in colonial Queensland (Australia)
- Charles Dutton, 7th Baron Sherborne (1911–1983), British peer
- Charles S. Dutton (born 1951), American actor and producer
- Charles M. Dutton, Crew Chief Spc. in the Warlords, B-Company of the 123rd Aviation Battalion in the American Division, killed in the Vietnam War
- Charles Christian Dutton (died 1842), pastoralist in South Australia
