= Edward Dutton =

Edward Dutton may refer to:

- Edward Payson Dutton (1831–1923), founder of American publisher E. P. Dutton
- Edward Dutton Cook (1829–1883), British dramatic critic and author
- Edward Dutton, 4th Baron Sherborne (1831–1919), British peer and diplomat
- Edward Dutton, British YouTuber, host of The Jolly Heretic podcast
