= James Dutton, 6th Baron Sherborne =

British peer (1873–1949)

James Huntly Dutton, 6th Baron Sherborne

Arms of Dutton: Quarterly argent and gules, in the second and third quarters a fret or

James Huntly Dutton, 6th Baron Sherborne, DSO (5 March 1873 – 17 September 1949), was a British peer.

== Background ==
Sherborne was the son of Colonel Hon. Charles Dutton (1842–1909), by his wife, May Arbuthnot Taylor (1849–1943). He was born in Fatchgarn, India where his father was Aide-de-camp to Frederick Roberts, Commander-in-Chief, India. His father was also Assistant Quarter-Master General, Afghan War 1878–80. James Huntly Dutton was the grandson of James Henry Legge Dutton, 3rd Baron Sherborne and inherited the barony of Sherborne when both his uncles, Edward Dutton, 4th Baron Sherborne and Frederick Dutton, 5th Baron Sherborne died childless (their younger brother Hon. Charles Dutton having predeceased them).

== Career ==
Dutton was commissioned a second lieutenant in the Cameronians (Scottish Rifles) on 21 October 1893, promoted to a lieutenant on 15 November 1895, and to a captain on 23 August 1899. He served in the Second Boer War from 1899 to 1902 with the 2nd Battalion of his regiment. They were with the Ladysmith relief force, and took part in the battles of Colenso (15 December 1899), Spion Kop (January 1900), Vaal Krantz and Tugela Heights (February 1900). Following the relief of Ladysmith on 1 March 1900, he served in Natal from March to June 1900, and was present at the action at Laing's Nek. From July until November 1900 he served in Transvaal east of Pretoria. After the war ended in June 1902, Dutton returned to the United Kingdom the following month, and arrived at Southampton in August.

In January 1903, Dutton was seconded as staff officer, and appointed aide-de-camp to Sir C. A. Moloney, colonial Governor of Trinidad and Tobago.

He later served in World War I 1914–19, and was appointed a Companion of the Distinguished Service Order (DSO) in 1915.

== Family ==
Sherborne married Ethel Mary Baird (1883–1969), daughter of William Baird and Caroline Muriel Burn-Callander, on 27 February 1908. They had the following children:

- Hon. Pamela Muriel Dutton (1910–1971).
- Hon. Charles Dutton, 7th Baron Sherborne (1911–1982).
- Hon. George Edward Dutton (1912–1981).
- Hon. Juliet Elizabeth Dutton (1915?-1986).

His younger brother, Vice-Admiral Hon. Arthur Brandreth Scott Dutton CB CMG RN (1876–1932) participated in the Battle of Jutland, the greatest naval battle of World War I. He was also Superintendent of Pembroke Dockyard 1922–24, Naval ADC to King George V 1926 and Commander Mediterranean Fleet Flotillas 1928–30. His younger sister, Hon. Mabel Honor Dutton, married 19 Aug 1903 Sir George James Robert Clerk of Penicuik, 9th Baronet.

Sherborne died on 17 September 1949 at age 76, and was succeeded in the barony by his son, Charles.

Peerage of Great Britain
Preceded by Frederick George Dutton	Baron Sherborne; 1920–1949	Succeeded by Charles Dutton
