= Dutton =

Dutton may refer to:

== People ==
- Dutton (name), people with the surname or given name Dutton

== Places ==
=== Canada ===
- Dutton/Dunwich, Ontario, town and municipality in Canada
- Dutton, Ontario

=== United Kingdom ===
- Dutton, Cheshire, village in England
- Dutton, Lancashire, village in England

=== United States ===
- Dutton, Alabama, town
- Dutton, Illinois, ghost town
- Dutton, Michigan
- Dutton, Montana, town in the United States
- Dutton, Nevada, ghost town
- Mount Dutton, Alaska

=== Australia ===
- Dutton, South Australia
- Mount Dutton Bay Conservation Park

== Other uses ==
- Dutton Cars, a prolific British kit car maker active between 1970 and 1989
- Dutton Speedwords, an auxiliary language and shorthand writing system
- Dutton Vocalion, a British recording company
- E. P. Dutton, an American book publishing company, since 1986 split into two imprints:
  - Dutton Penguin
  - Dutton Children's Books
- USS Dutton, ships of the US Navy
