= Henry Dutton (cricketer) =

English cricketer and British Army officer

Personal information
- Full name: Henry John Dutton
- Born: 17 January 1847; Paddington, Middlesex, England
- Died: 1 January 1935 (aged 87); Hinton Ampner, Hampshire, England
- Batting: Right-handed
- Bowling: Unknown

Domestic team information
- Years: Team
- 1875: Hampshire

Career statistics
Competition	First-class
Matches	1
Runs scored	7
Batting average	–
100s/50s	–/–
Top score	7*
Balls bowled	36
Wickets	0
Bowling average	–
5 wickets in innings	–
10 wickets in match	–
Best bowling	–
Catches/stumpings	–/–
- Source: Cricinfo, 26 May 2022

Henry John Dutton JP (17 January 1847 — 1 January 1935) was an English cricketer and British Army officer.

The son of The Hon. John Thomas Dutton, he was born at Paddington on 17 January 1847. He was educated at Eton College, after which he entered into the British Army by purchasing the rank of ensign in the Rifle Brigade in November 1866. Dutton later made a single appearance in first-class cricket for Hampshire against Kent at Winchester in 1875. From the lower order, he scored 0 not out in the first innings in which he batted, and 7 not out in the second innings. In June the following year, he retired from the Rifle Brigade with the rank of lieutenant. In later life, Dutton served as a justice of the peace for Hampshire. He died at Hinton Ampner House in Hampshire on New Year's Day in 1935. He was survived by his wife, Eleanor, with whom he had four children; amongst them was Ralph Dutton, 8th Baron Sherborne.
