= Henry Dutton =

Henry Dutton may refer to:

- Henry Dutton (politician) (1796–1869), American politician, governor of Connecticut
- Henry Dutton (pastoralist) (1844–1914), pastoralist in South Australia
- Henry Hampden Dutton (1879–1932), his son, South Australian pastoralist
- Henry Dutton (cricketer) (1847–1935), English cricketer
- Harry Dutton (footballer) (1898–1972), English footballer
