= Thomas Dutton (disambiguation) =

Thomas Dutton may refer to:

- Thomas Dutton (1421–1459), medieval English knight
- Thomas Goldsworthy Dutton (1820–1891), English marine lithographer
- Thomas Dutton (musician) (born 1985), American musician
- Thomas Dutton (physician) (1854–1935), British dietitian and physician
