= Dutton, Nevada =

- Ghost town
- Location in the state of Nevada Dutton (the United States)
- Coordinates: 41°11′22″N 116°44′19″W
- Country: United States
- State: Nevada
- County: Elko
- Elevation: 5,150 ft (1,570 m)
- Time zone: UTC-8 (PST)
  - Summer (DST): UTC-7 (PDT)

Dutton is a ghost town in Elko County, in the U.S. state of Nevada.

== History ==
A post office was established at Dutton in 1907, and remained in operation until it was discontinued in 1913. Growth of nearby Midas, Nevada spelled the end of Dutton.
