= Rollin Josiah Dutton =

American politician

Rollin Josiah Dutton (August 21, 1884 – July 18, 1955) was an American businessman and politician.

Dutton was born on a farm in Crystal Lake Township, Hennepin County, Minnesota. He graduated from Minnesota North High School (North Community High School) in 1904. Dutton lived in Robbinsdale, Minnesota and was the secretary-treasurer of the Minneapolis National Farm Loan Association. He served as the Crystal, Minnesota Village Recorder for eight years. Dutton served in the Minnesota House of Representatives in 1925 and 1926.
