= George Dutton (disambiguation) =

George Dutton (1899–1977) was an American sound engineer.

George Dutton may also refer to:

- George Brintnall Dutton (1818–1898), American businessman and politician
- George Hough Dutton (1825–1905), American merchant and pioneer in the California gold rush

== See also ==
- George Dutton Rand (1833–1910), American architect
