= Robert Dutton =

Robert Dutton may refer to:

- Robert Dutton (politician) (1950–2022), American politician
- Robert Dutton (footballer) (born 1957), Australian rules footballer
- Robert Dutton (engineer), American electrical engineer
