= Thomas Dutton (physician) =

British dietitian and physician (1854–1935)

Thomas Dutton LRCP LRCS
- Born: 1854
- Died: November 1935 (aged 80–81); London, England
- Education: Durham University (MB and MD)
- Occupations: Dietitian, writer

Thomas Dutton LRCP LRCS (1854 – November 1935) was a British dietitian and physician.

== Biography ==
Dutton obtained his MB and MD from Durham University. He was a member of the Royal College of Physicians of Edinburgh and a Licentiate of the Royal College of Surgeons of Edinburgh. Dutton was a consultant at Harley Street and specialized in dietetics. He was honorary surgeon to the Royal Defence Corps and former vice-chairman of the Pure Food Society. He authored many medical works which were positively reviewed. In 1892, his book Indigestion: Clearly Explained, Treated, And Dieted was described by a reviewer in The British Medical Journal "as a very useful little book, full of sound good sense and wise saws". Dutton was an advocate of heliotherapy as treatment for phthisis, tuberculous and typhoid fever.

Dutton practised in Whitechapel at the time of the Whitechapel murders. He had his own theories about Jack the Ripper. In his later years Dutton lived as a recluse. The rooms in which he lived were said to be covered in cobwebs. He died age 78 of heart disease at his home in Uxbridge Road. Dutton is reported to have died in poverty.

== Dieting ==
Dutton was a noted expert on obesity. He authored an early book on the subject, Obesity: Its Cause and Treatment, published in 1896. Dutton suggested that obesity was the result of excess consumption and could be "easily cured by scientific dietetic treatment, combined with judicious exercise, massage, and baths." Dutton recommended a diet of lean meat, white fish and vegetables to treat obesity. Forbidden foods were fat meat, white bread, processed sugar, potatoes, heavy wines, nuts and chocolate.

In the early 20th century, Dutton defended the merits of drinking alcohol to British newspapers. In opposition to teetotallers, Dutton recommended moderate consumption of alcohol. Dutton commented that "sound practical experience is entirely on the side of the beneficial effect of alcohol... Wine and beer have stood the test of ages among nearly every nation." In 1909, Dutton stated that beer, cheese and wholemeal bread were the best nutritious foods for the working man. Dutton criticized non-alcoholic drinks for their adulteration such as the addition of acetic acid or sulphuric acid.

== Selected publications ==
- Digestion and Diet Rationally Discussed (1892)
- Domestic Hygiene (1894)
- Sea-Sickness (1894)
- Indigestion, Corpulency and Gout (1895)
- Obesity: Its Cause and Treatment (1896)
- Food and Drink Rationally Discussed (1898)
- Indigestion: Clearly Explained, Treated, and Dieted (1899)
- The Alcohol Question Further Considered (1911)
