= Ralph Dutton, 8th Baron Sherborne =

Last Baron Sherborne (1898–1985)

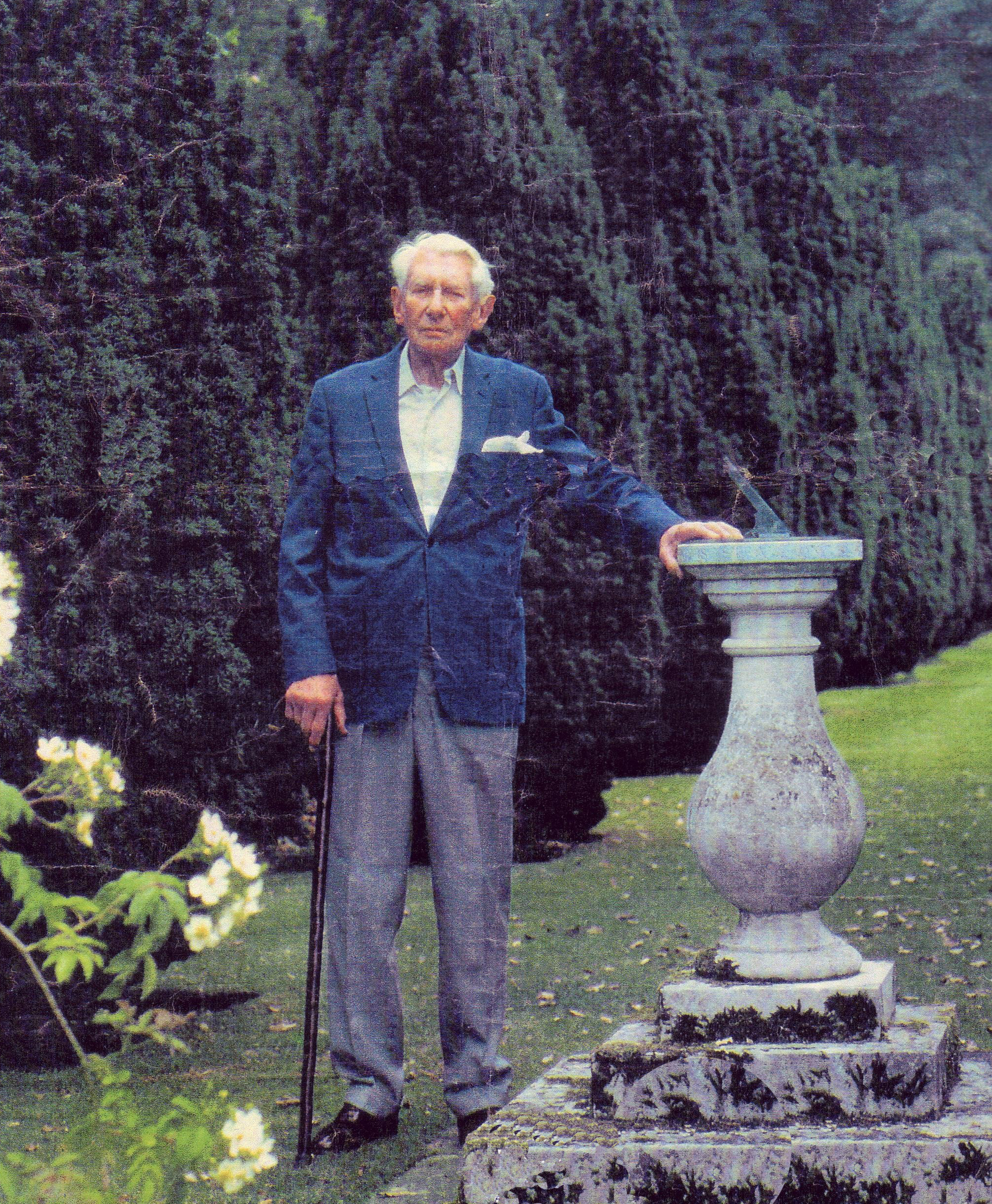
- Born: Ralph Stawell Dutton; 25 August 1898
- Died: 20 April 1985 (aged 86)
- Education: Eton College
- Alma mater: Oxford University; Cirencester Agricultural College
- Parent(s): Henry John Dutton and Eleanor Cave

The Uffizi Society, Oxford, c.1920. Dutton (wearing glasses) is seated third from left. Also in the front row are Lord Balniel, later 28th Earl of Crawford (2nd from left); Anthony Eden, subsequently Prime Minister and Earl of Avon (4th from left); and Lord David Cecil (5th from left). Second row: later Sir Henry Studholme (5th from left)

Ralph Stawell Dutton, 8th Baron Sherborne (1898–1985), was the 8th and last Baron Sherborne. He created the gardens at Hinton Ampner, near Alresford in Hampshire, England, and on his death left the house and garden to the National Trust. It is now open to the public.

== Early life ==
Ralph Dutton was born on 25 August 1898. He was the only son of Henry John Dutton (1847–1935) and Eleanor Cave (1866–1946), the third of four children, with two elder sisters and one younger sister.

He attended West Downs, a preparatory school near Winchester, before studying at Eton College. After Eton, he went to Oxford University, where he formed the Uffizi Society, and later also studied at Cirencester Agricultural College.

He started to create the garden at Hinton Ampner in the 1930s, with funding from his father. Previously, the parkland came directly up to the house, which was designed to be a hunting lodge. He worked for a time for the College of Arms and Lloyd's of London, while living in Eaton Square in London.

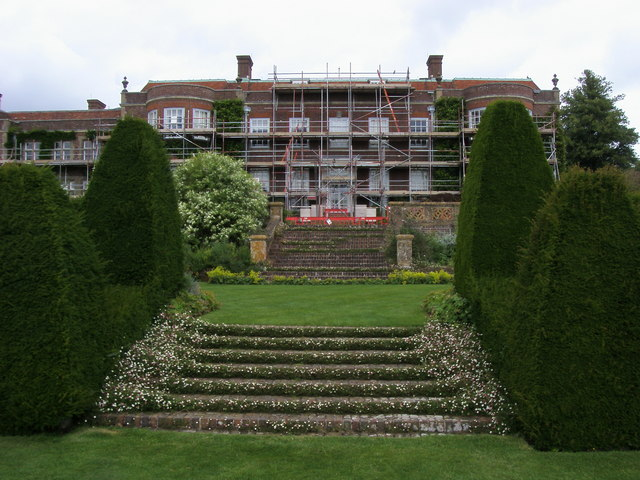
Hinton Ampner House. Dutton's bedroom was in the room with the bow windows to the left on the first floor.

== Owner of Hinton Ampner ==
In 1935, on the death of his father he inherited Hinton Ampner. The house, originally built in 1793, was remodelled extensively in 1867. Dutton commissioned architects Gerald Wellesley and Trenwith Wills to restore it to its Georgian appearance, worked carried out from 1936-39. It was badly damaged by fire in 1960, but Dutton restored it again.

Dutton collected paintings, hung in the house, including a set of paintings of the four seasons by Jacob de Wit, depicting cherubs painted in a three-dimensional monochrome style. He also had a well-stocked library in the house, which was damaged in the fire.

Dutton was appointed High Sheriff of Hampshire for 1944. He was an executive member of the National Arts Collection Fund.

== Baron Sherborne ==
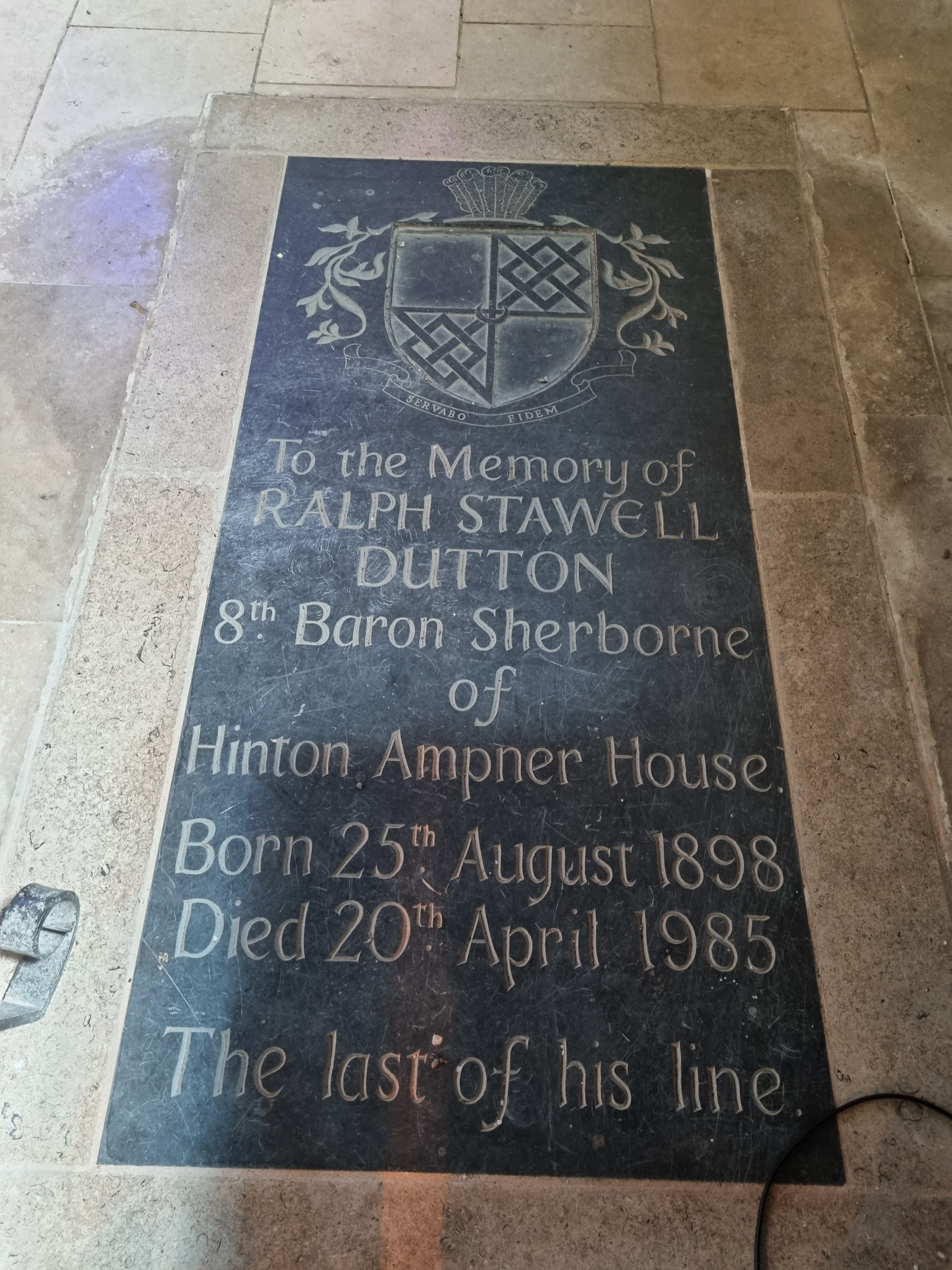
The memorial to Ralph Dutton in All Saints Church, Hinton Ampner

A great-grandson of John Dutton, 2nd Baron Sherborne, Ralph Dutton became the 8th Baron Sherborne on the death of his cousin Charles Dutton, 7th Baron Sherborne, in 1982. With no direct heirs and unmarried, he gave his estate, including Hinton Ampner, to the National Trust on his death on 20 April 1985.

== Books ==
Dutton wrote the book A Hampshire Manor, which chronicles the history of the manor at Hinton Ampner and its gardens. The book also includes, in the chapter on the 18th century, details concerning the well-documented haunting.

Other non-fiction books by Dutton:

- The English Country House [1935]
- The English Garden [1937]
- The Land of France (with Lord Holden) [1939]
- The English Interior [1948]
- Wessex [1950]
- The Age of Wren [1951]
- London Homes [1952]
- Normandy and Brittany [1953]
- The Victorian Home [1954]
- The Châteaux of France [1957]
- English Court Life [1963]

A biography of him, titled A Man and His Home, Ralph Dutton of Hinton Ampner, 8th Baron Sherborne, by John Holden, was published in 2023.

Peerage of Great Britain
Preceded by Charles Dutton	Baron Sherborne; 1982–1985	Extinct
