= Hinton Ampner =

Country house, village and parish in Hampshire, England

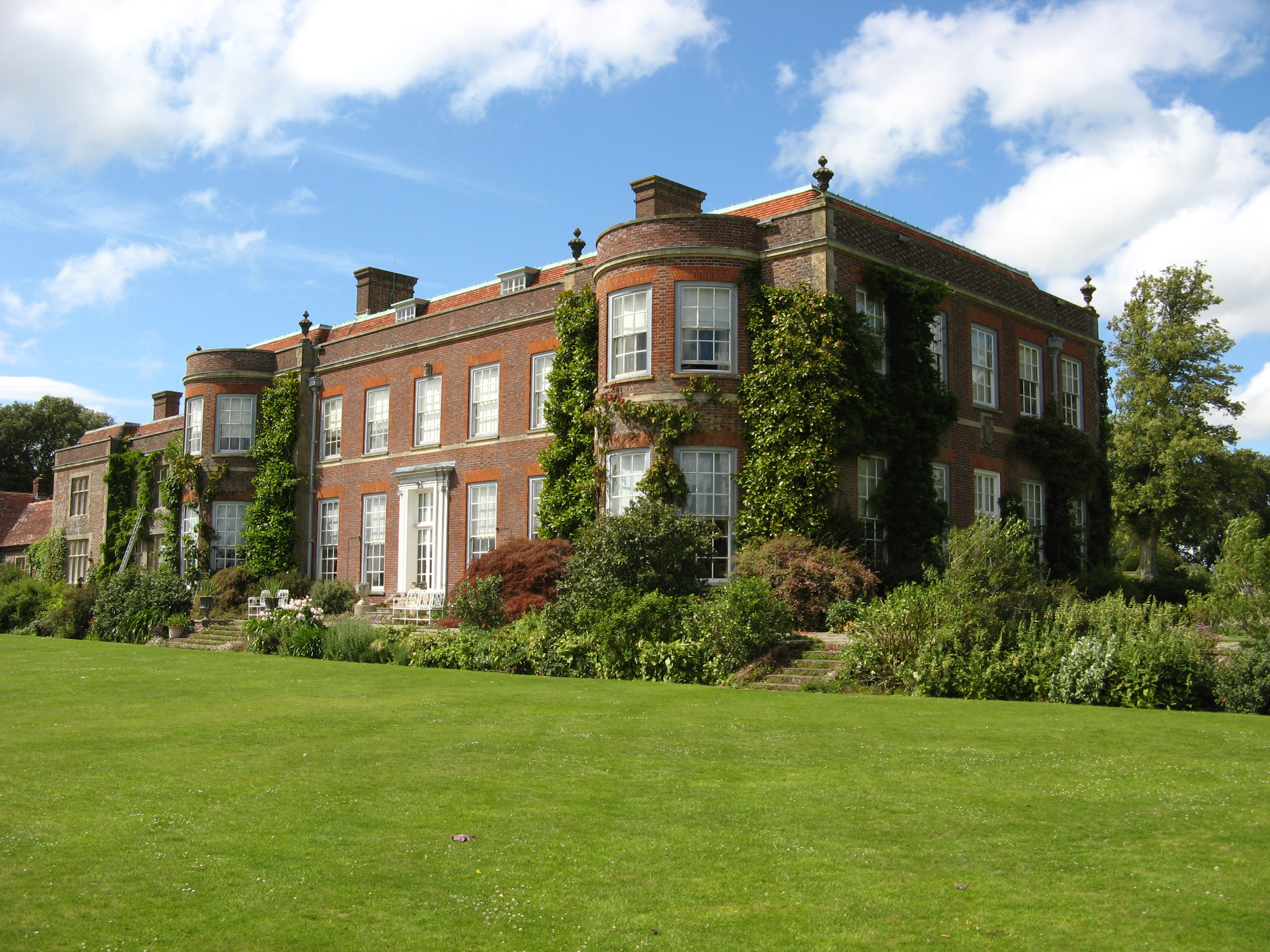
- Garden front of house

- Location within Hampshire
- 51°02′37″N 1°09′03″W
- Type: Country house
- Location: Bramdean and Hinton Ampner
- OS grid reference: SU 59639 27483

History
- Built: 1793

Site notes
- Area: Hampshire
- Architects: Trenwith Wills; Lord Gerald Wellesley
- Architectural style: Neo-Georgian
- Owner: National Trust

Listed Building – Grade II
- Official name: Hinton Ampner House
- Designated: 5 December 1955
- Reference no.: 1095121

Hinton Ampner is a village and country house estate with gardens and former civil parish, now in the parish of Bramdean and Hinton Ampner, in the Winchester district, in the county of Hampshire, England. It is near Alresford and eight miles due east of Winchester. The village lies on the north slope of a long chalk ridge, with the house and church at its highest point. The area is part of the broader Hampshire Downs, a large area of predominantly chalk downland. The nearest large river is the River Itchen to the west of the area. To the north west of Hinton is the village of Cheriton and New Cheriton. The village of Kilmeston is to the south.

The house is a Grade II listed building. The house and garden are owned by the National Trust and are open to the public.

== Etymology ==
The name derives from the old English hēah tūn meaning the homestead on the high ground. The suffix Ampner is a corruption of Almoner, denoting that an Almoner of St. Swithuns Priory owned the manor.

== History ==
The area around Hinton has evidence of Neolithic and Bronze Age activity, including the presence of several barrows. The first record of the village was in the Domesday survey of 1086 which recorded 8 Hides and a church.

In 1931 the parish had a population of 330. On 1 April 1932 the parish was abolished and merged with Bramdean.

== Church ==
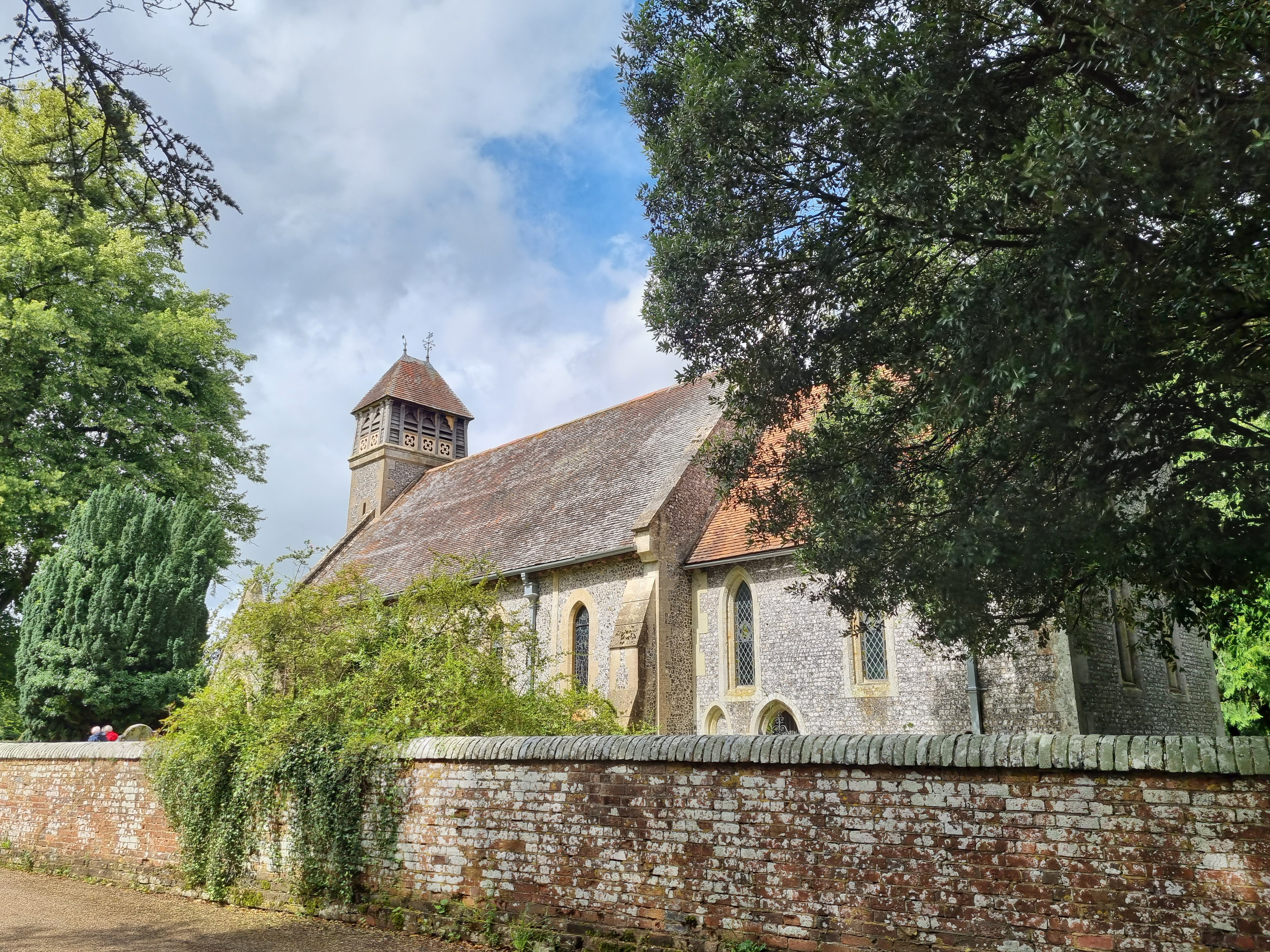
All Saints Church, Hinton Ampner, seen from the south.

The local church, All Saints Church, lies between the manor house and village cottages. The current church dates mostly from the 13th century but incorporates some pre-Norman Conquest elements from a previous church. The church was altered in the early 19th century and the bell tower modified. The church contains numerous memorials to the previous owners of the estate, as well as three historic bells, two dated 1603 and the other 1719. The church also contains several items and memorials rescued by Ralph Dutton from the church of St.Mary at Laverstoke which was demolished in the early 1950s. Dutton also commissioned two windows for the east end, designed by Patrick Reyntiens and John Piper in 1970. All Saints is a Grade II* listed building.

== Hinton Ampner House ==
In the 1540s, a large Tudor manor house was built in Hinton Ampner. By 1597, the house was under the ownership of the Stewkley family, when Thomas Stewkley took over the lease from the Dean and Chapter of Winchester. In 1719, on the death of Sir Hugh Stewkley, the estate passed to his daughter Mary who married Edward Stawell. Their descendant, Henry Stawell Bilson-Legge subsequently inherited the estate and demolished the Tudor house in favour of a new building (the old house being on the site of the present day orchard).

The current Hinton Ampner house was built in 1793 and remodelled extensively in 1867. The house passed into the Dutton family in 1803 when Hampshire heiress Mary Bilson-Legge married John Dutton, who later became 2nd Lord Sherborne. It passed to their second son, John Dutton, whose descendants owned the estate until it passed to the National Trust. Ralph Dutton, its final owner, inherited the estate upon the death of his father in 1935 and quickly proceeded to transform the Victorian design and décor, which he detested. The house was remodelled in the Neo-Georgian style by Trenwith Wills and Lord Gerald Wellesley for Ralph Dutton between 1936 and 1939 to his vision of what it would have been like had it been built on its current scale in 1790 – a Georgian country house.

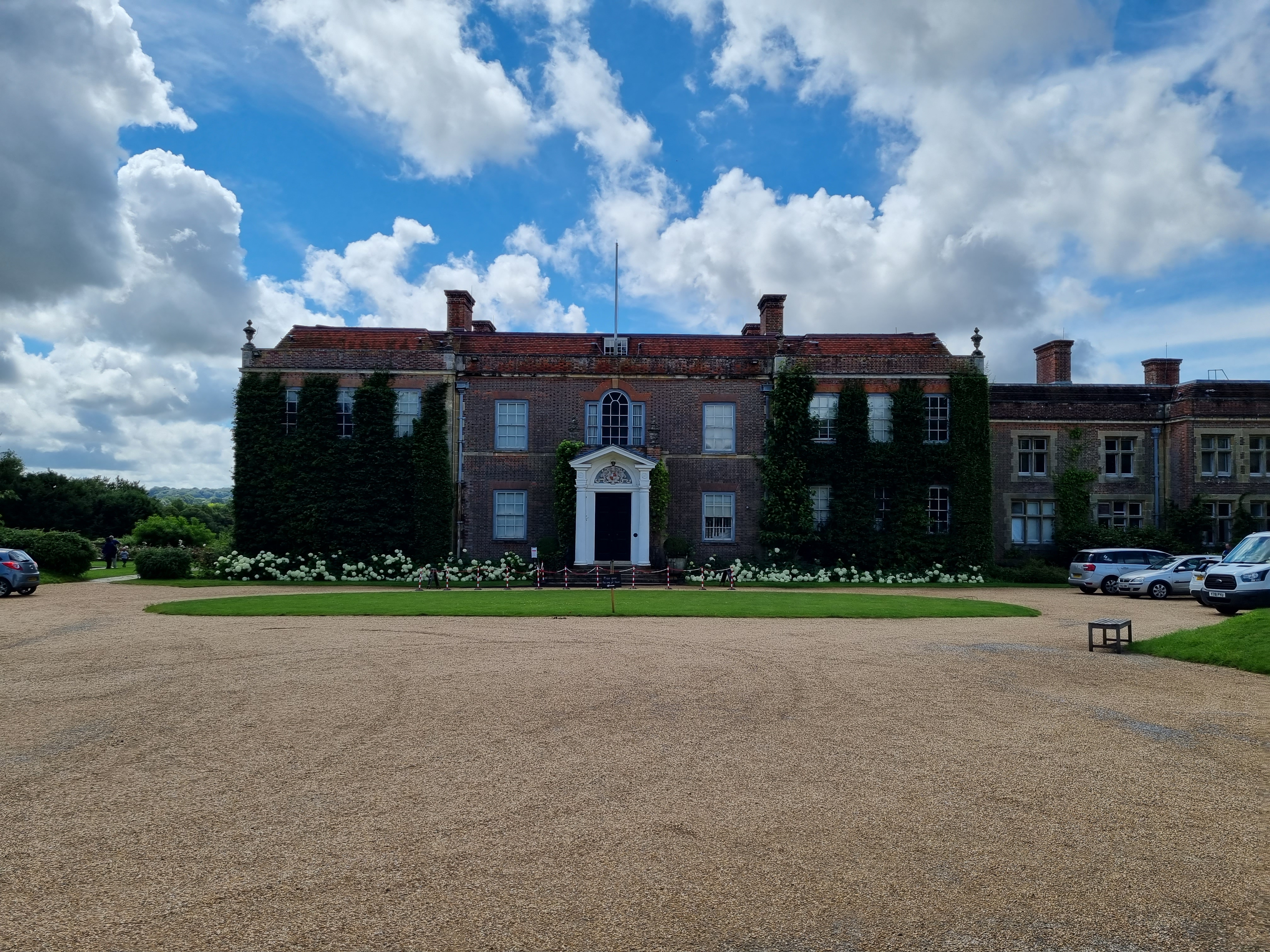
The north facing main entrance of the house

During the Second World War, the house was used as accommodation for girls from the Portsmouth Girls School to keep them away from the city. The house was badly damaged by fire in April 1960, with nearly all rooms impacted by fire or smoke. A restoration campaign was initiated within days of the fire, led by the same firm that had undertaken the renovations in the 1930s. The work was completed in May 1963, including the alteration of the roof line, which returned the building to its Georgian dimensions. Dutton decorated the house with many pieces recycled from stately homes and worked with designer Ronald Fleming to decorate the rooms in a manner appropriate to his rebuilt collection.

Ralph Dutton, with no direct heirs, gave the estate to the National Trust, on his death in 1985. He is buried in the graveyard of the nearby church of All Saints.

=== Interior and collections ===
Long before inheriting the house, Ralph Dutton became an avid collector of early 18th century furnishings and the house is now lavishly decorated with notable examples of Regency art and decorative objects. Dutton's acquisitions were in part funded by his literary efforts, having written a series of books on architecture and history.

==== The entrance hall ====
A notable feature of the entrance hall is the porphyry fireplace, salvaged by Dutton from Hamilton Palace, over which hangs Selene and Endymion by Giovanni Antonio Pellegrini. The giltwood torchères were purchased from the 1949 sale at Tortworth Court.

==== The dining room ====
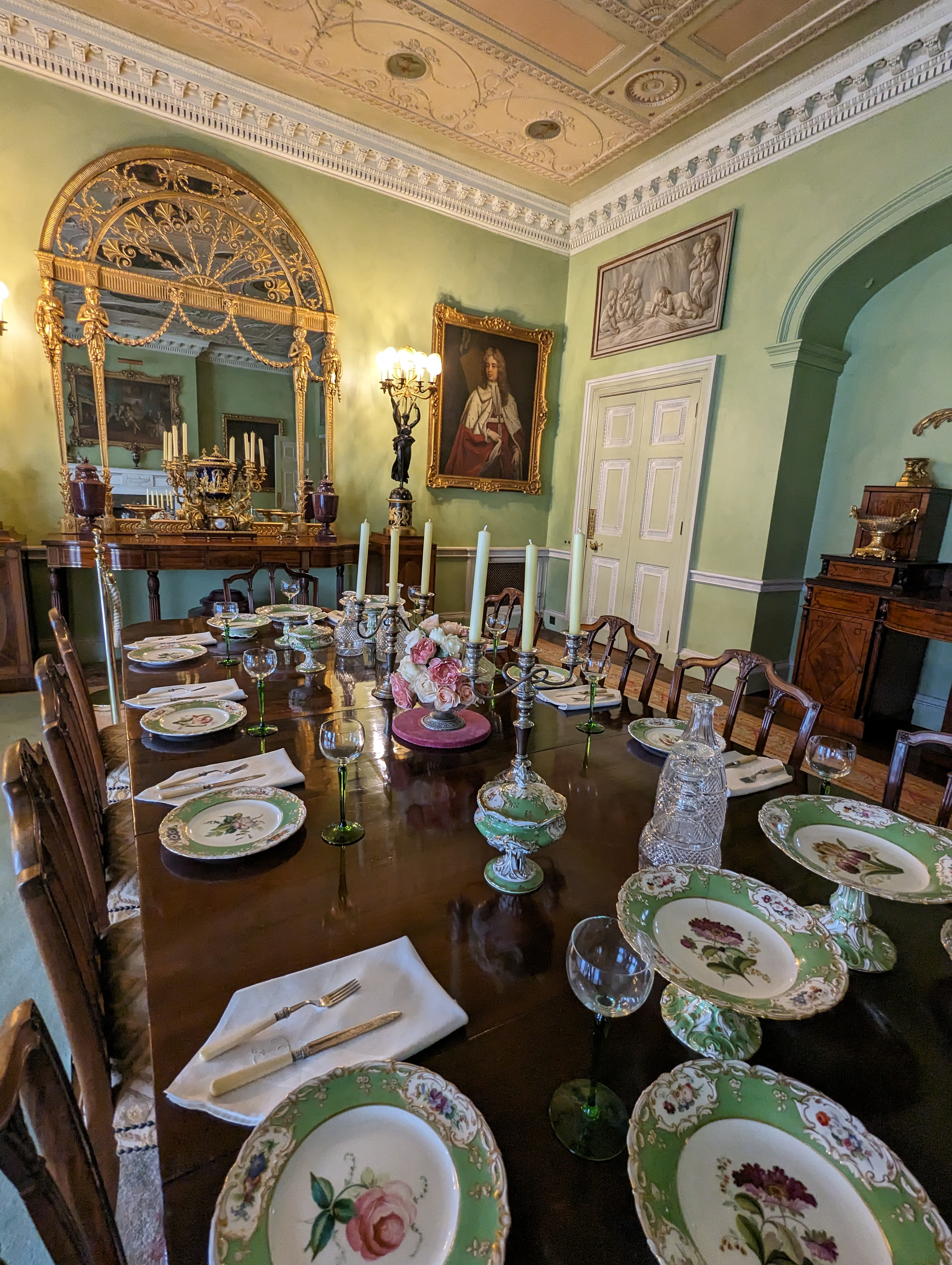
The dining room

A reproduction of a ceiling by Robert Adam, originally designed for Robert Child of Osterley but due to be demolished at Lord Rosebury's house at 38 Berkeley Square in London, was recreated in the dining room. This involved detaching the original painted paper roundels by Angelica Kauffman and taking moulds of Adam's plasterwork. The work was completed in 1940 but later largely destroyed, including all Kauffman's work, by the 1960 fire. Dutton hired Elizabeth Biddulph ROI to repaint all of the roundels. The mirror, also a design by Robert Adam, was originally designed for Derby House in Grosvenor Square. Also notable is a pair of paintings, probably from an original set of the four seasons in the manner of Jacob de Wit, depicting putti painted in a three-dimensional grisaille style.

==== The library ====
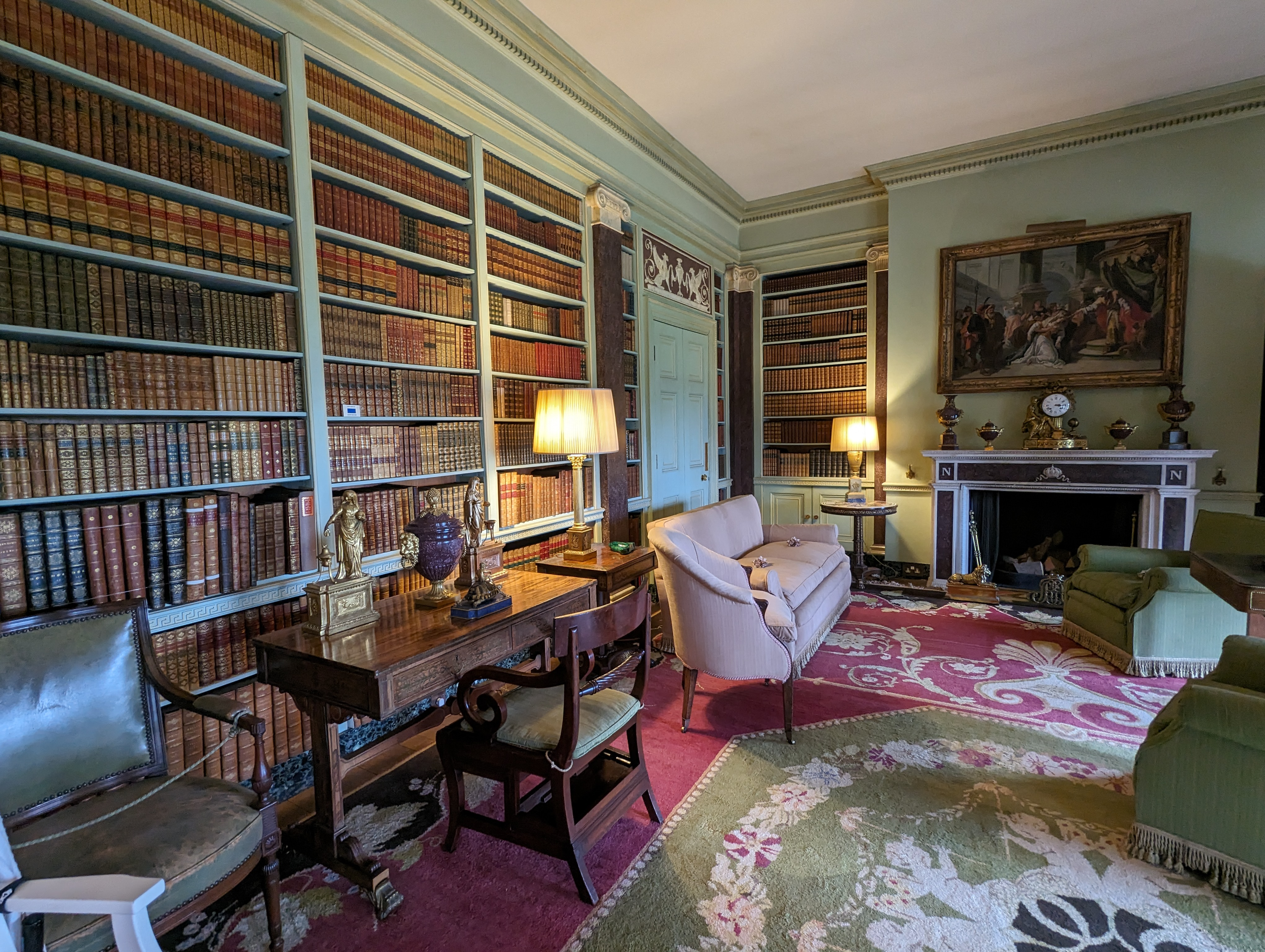
The library

Dutton's book collection was completely destroyed in the 1960 fire and was completely replaced with newly acquired works. The marble and porphyry fireplace, decorated with Napoleon's insignia, may have come from the Château de Saint-Cloud. Hanging over the fireplace is Esther Fainting Before Ahasuerus by Francesco Fontebasso.

=== Poltergeist claims ===
The old Tudor house attained notoriety, in the 18th century, after it was said to have become uninhabitable due to loud noises attributed to a poltergeist. One tenant, Mary Ricketts, wrote about her experiences in the house, which included mysterious sounds as well as ghostly figures. That house was pulled down in 1793, after its replacement had been built about 50 metres (160 feet) to the south. Harry Price, citing Ricketts' statements, wrote at length about the case in his book Poltergeist Over England (1945).

Claims about the poltergeist were disputed by Trevor H. Hall who suggested that "underground water was mainly responsible for the noises at Hinton, although the account of some of them is highly suggestive of seismic disturbance."

=== The gardens ===
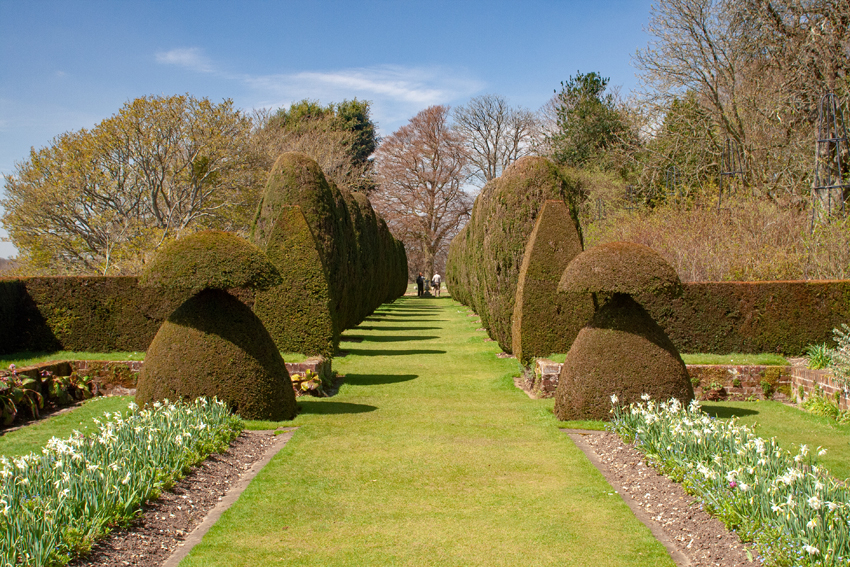
Yew Path, Hinton Ampner

The current garden layout of the house was created by Ralph Dutton, starting in 1930, making this a modern 20th-century garden. Previously, the parkland came directly up to the house, which was designed to be a hunting lodge. He redeveloped the gardens, creating a lily pond along the east façade of the house, as well as replanting the terraces to the south. The formal gardens are particularly notable for the variety of roses. The estate in total comprises 667 hectares (1,650 acres) of chalk farm and woodland, replanted by Dutton, which were included in the 1985 bequest to the National Trust.
