= Angus Holden, 3rd Baron Holden =

Angus Holden

Angus William Eden Holden, 3rd Baron Holden and 4th Baronet Holden (1 August 1898 – 6 July 1951), was a British Liberal then Labour politician.

Holden was the son of Ernest Illingworth Holden, 2nd Baron Holden, and his first wife Ethel (née Cookson), and succeeded to the barony on the death of his father in 1937.

He stood as the Liberal candidate for Tottenham North at the 1929 general election.

He was a Speaker and deputy chairman in the House of Lords 1947 and served in the Labour administration of Clement Attlee as Under-Secretary of State for Commonwealth Relations from March to July 1950.

Lord Holden died in July 1951, aged 52. He never married; on his death the barony became extinct. He was succeeded in his baronetcy by his kinsman Sir Isaac Holden, 5th Baronet.

He wrote a number of books; those listed in the British Library catalogue (all running into several editions) are

- English Country Houses Open to the Public. (illustrated)
- The Land of France (with Ralph Dutton)
- Ceylon
- Four Generations of Our Royal Family
- French Châteaux Open to the Public (with Ralph Dutton)
- Purgatory Revisited. A Victorian parody

Political offices
Preceded by Patrick Gordon Walker	Under-Secretary of State for Commonwealth Relations; 1950	Succeeded by David Rees-Williams
Peerage of the United Kingdom
Preceded by Ernest Illingworth Holden	Baron Holden; 1937–1951	Extinct
Baronetage of the United Kingdom
Preceded by Ernest Illingworth Holden	Baronet (of Oakworth House); 1937–1951	Succeeded by Isaac Holden Holden
