= Sir Ralph Dutton, 1st Baronet =

Member of the Parliament of England

Sir Ralph Dutton (c.1645-1721), 1st Baronet, was an English landowner and politician.

== Life ==
He was the younger son of the royalist Sir Ralph Dutton (1601–46) of Standish, Gloucestershire, a gentleman of the Privy Chamber extraordinary to Charles I, and Mary Duncomb, the co-heiress of a London haberdasher and granddaughter of Sir Thomas Bennett.

He married Grizel, the daughter of Sir Edward Poole of Kemble, Wiltshire, about 1674. She died in 1678, having borne a daughter. In that year her husband became a baronet, for a payment of £1100. The following year he inherited Sherborne from his childless brother William. In 1679 he married Mary, heiress of Peter Barwick of London, physician to Charles II. They had several children baptized at Westminster. Sir Ralph represented Gloucestershire in parliament in 1679–81 and in 1689–98, when he was aligned with the Whigs. In 1705 he stood as a Tory and was defeated. He was a JP and deputy lieutenant and served as colonel of the Green regiment of Gloucestershire foot militia. Although he was a wealthy man, Sir Ralph ran up enormous debts, partly through his addiction to greyhound coursing. In 1710 he made his estate over to his son John and moved to Ireland. By 1716 he owed almost £10,000 and a special deed was required to protect his son's marriage settlement. By his death Sir Ralph was living on a yearly allowance of £400. He died in Ireland in 1721. His wife was living in St Martin in the Fields, Middlesex when she died in 1723.
