= James Dutton, 3rd Baron Sherborne =

British peer

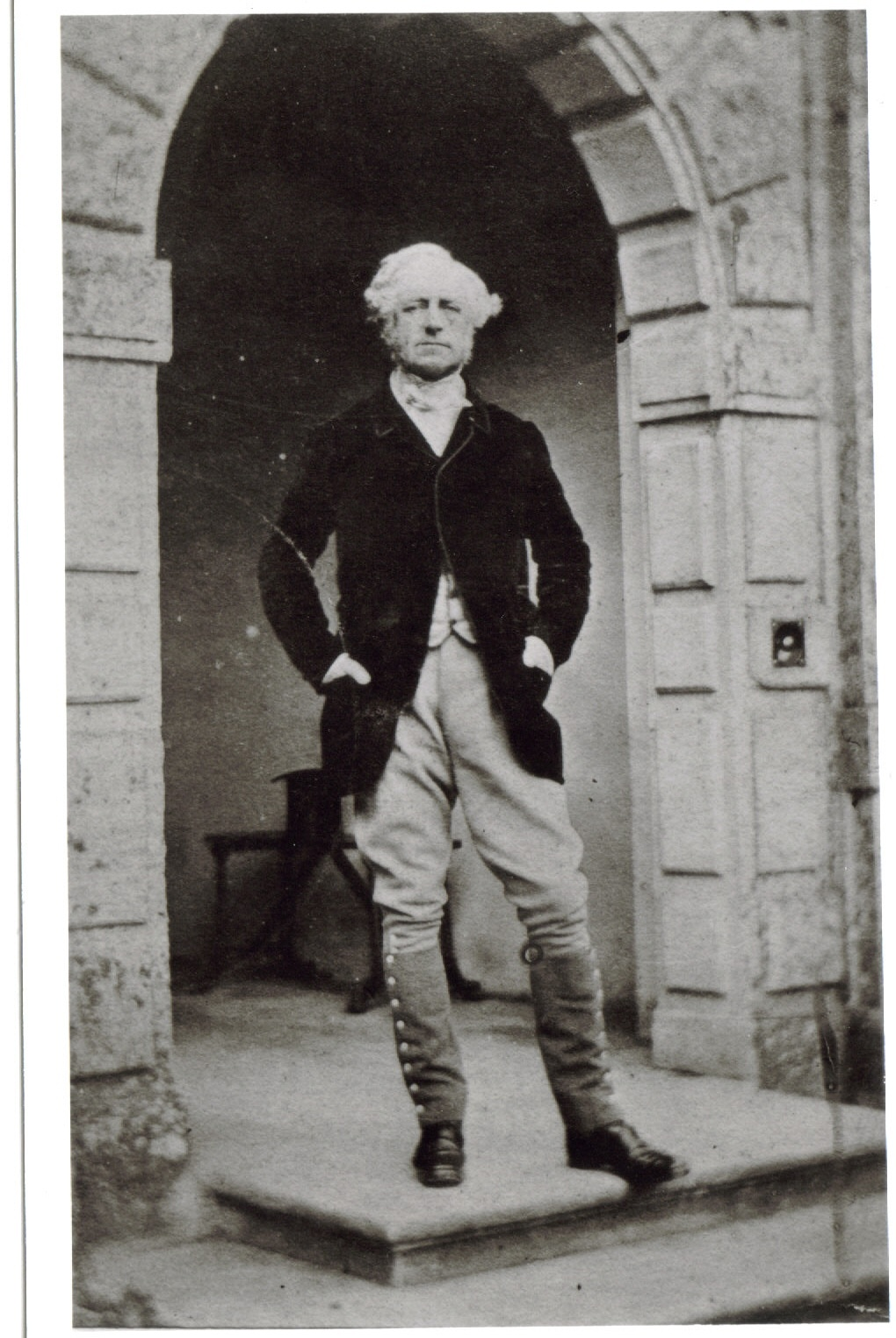
James Henry Legge Dutton, 3rd Baron Sherborne, at Bibury House.

Arms of Dutton: Quarterly argent and gules, in the second and third quarters a fret or

James Henry Legge Dutton, 3rd Baron Sherborne (30 May 1804 – 8 March 1883), was a British peer.

== Background ==
Sherborne was the son of John Dutton, 2nd Baron Sherborne, of Sherborne, Gloucestershire, by his wife, Hon. Mary Bilson Legge (1780–1864), daughter of Henry Legge, 2nd Baron Stawell and Hon. Mary Curzon.

== Family ==
Lord Sherborne married Lady Elizabeth Howard (1803–1845), daughter of Thomas Howard, 16th Earl of Suffolk and Hon. Elizabeth Jane Dutton, on 22 June 1826. They had eleven children:

- Henry James Legge Dutton (d. 1830).
- Elizabeth Esther Dutton (1827–1829).
- John William Dutton (1828–1858).
- Edward Dutton, 4th Baron Sherborne (1831–1919), married Emily Teresa de Stern (1846–1905).
- Hon. Julia Henrietta Dutton (1832–1890).
- Emily Isabella Constance Dutton (1834–1890), married Edwin Corbett (1819–1888) HBM Minister, Stockholm, Sweden
- Mary Laura Dutton (1836–1859).
- James Robert Dutton (1838–1857).
- Frederick Dutton, 5th Baron Sherborne (1840–1920).
- Col. Hon. Charles Dutton (1842–1909), married May Arbuthnot Taylor (1849–1943). Father of James Dutton, 6th Baron Sherborne.
- Henry Thomas Dutton (1844–1857).

Secondly, Lord Sherborne married Susan Block (1829–1907), daughter of James Block.

Lord Sherborne was Provincial Grand Master of Gloucestershire of the Freemasons (1855–1880). His favourite living place was Bibury Manor in the village of Bibury. He was an avid race horse breeder and active member of The Bibury Club, the world's oldest racing club, which was formed in 1681 and held race meetings on Macaroni Downs above Bibury until the early part of the twentieth century. He also had a London home in Grosvenor Square. Sherborne died on 8 March 1883, aged 78, and was succeeded in the barony by his son, Edward.

Peerage of Great Britain
Preceded by John Baron Dutton	Baron Sherborne; 1862–1883	Succeeded by Edward Lenox Dutton
