= Edward Dutton, 4th Baron Sherborne =

British peer and diplomat

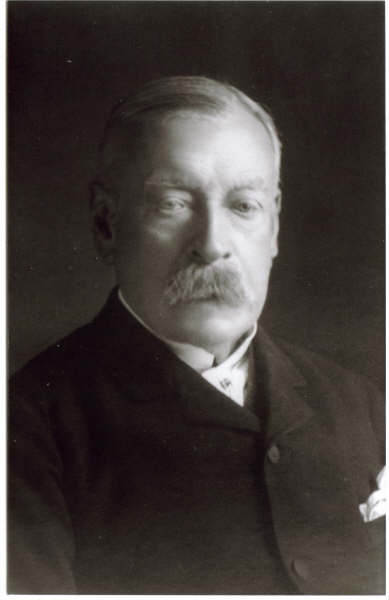
Edward Lenox Dutton, 4th Baron Sherborne

Arms of Dutton: Quarterly argent and gules, in the second and third quarters a fret or

Edward Lenox Dutton, 4th Baron Sherborne (23 April 1831 – 18 July 1919), was a British peer and diplomat.

== Background ==
Sherborne was the son of James Dutton, 3rd Baron Sherborne, of Sherborne, Gloucestershire, with his wife, Lady Elizabeth Howard, daughter of Thomas Howard, 16th Earl of Suffolk, and Hon. Elizabeth Jane Dutton.

== Career ==
Sherborne was a British diplomat with posts in Frankfurt, Germany and in Madrid, Spain. At the age of 51 he became the 4th Baron Sherborne and inherited the Sherborne estate which had been somewhat depleted by his father. Through frugality, careful administration and his marriage to an heiress, the 4th Lord Sherborne was successful in restoring the barony's formerly strong financial position. Sherborne was President of the Bristol and Gloucestershire Archaeological Society 1887–1888. In addition, he was an antiquarian, an ornithologist and Justice of the Peace for the County of Gloucester.

== Family ==
On 5 July 1894, at the age of 63, Lord Sherborne married Emily Theresa de Stern, daughter of Baron Herman de Stern and his wife Julia Goldsmid, dau. of Aaron Asher Goldsmid, of Cavendish Square, co. Middlesex. The Stern banking family, much intermarried with the Goldsmids, Salomons, Mocattas, Montefiores and Jessels, was one of the most prominent (extended) families of (Sephardic) Anglo-Jewry. They had no children.

Sherborne died on 18 July 1919, aged 88, and was succeeded in the barony by his brother, Frederick.

Peerage of Great Britain
| Preceded by James Henry Legge Dutton | Baron Sherborne; 1883–1919 | Succeeded by Frederick George Dutton |
