= Charles Dutton, 7th Baron Sherborne =

British peer

Arms of Dutton: Quarterly argent and gules, in the second and third quarters a fret or

Charles Dutton, 7th Baron Sherborne (13 May 1911 – 25 December 1982), was a British peer.

== Background ==
Charles Thomas Sherborne Dutton was the son of Lt. Col. James Huntly Dutton, 6th Baron Sherborne, and Ethel Mary Baird.

== Career ==
Dutton was a ferry pilot with the Air Transport Auxiliary between 1940 and 1945. He was one of at least four one-armed ATA pilots. His right arm was amputated due to a congenital birth defect. He was a Member of Gloucestershire County Council between 1955 and 1964.

== Family ==
On 20 February 1943, Dutton married Joan Molesworth Jenkinson (née Dunn, widow of John Anthony Jenkinson; d. 1982), the 3rd daughter of Sir James Hamet Dunn, 1st Bt. and Gertrude Paterson Price. They had no children.

On his death, the Barony of Sherborne passed to a cousin, Ralph Stawell Dutton.

Peerage of Great Britain
Preceded by James Dutton	Baron Sherborne; 1949–1983	Succeeded by Ralph Dutton
