= John Dutton, 2nd Baron Sherborne =

British Baron

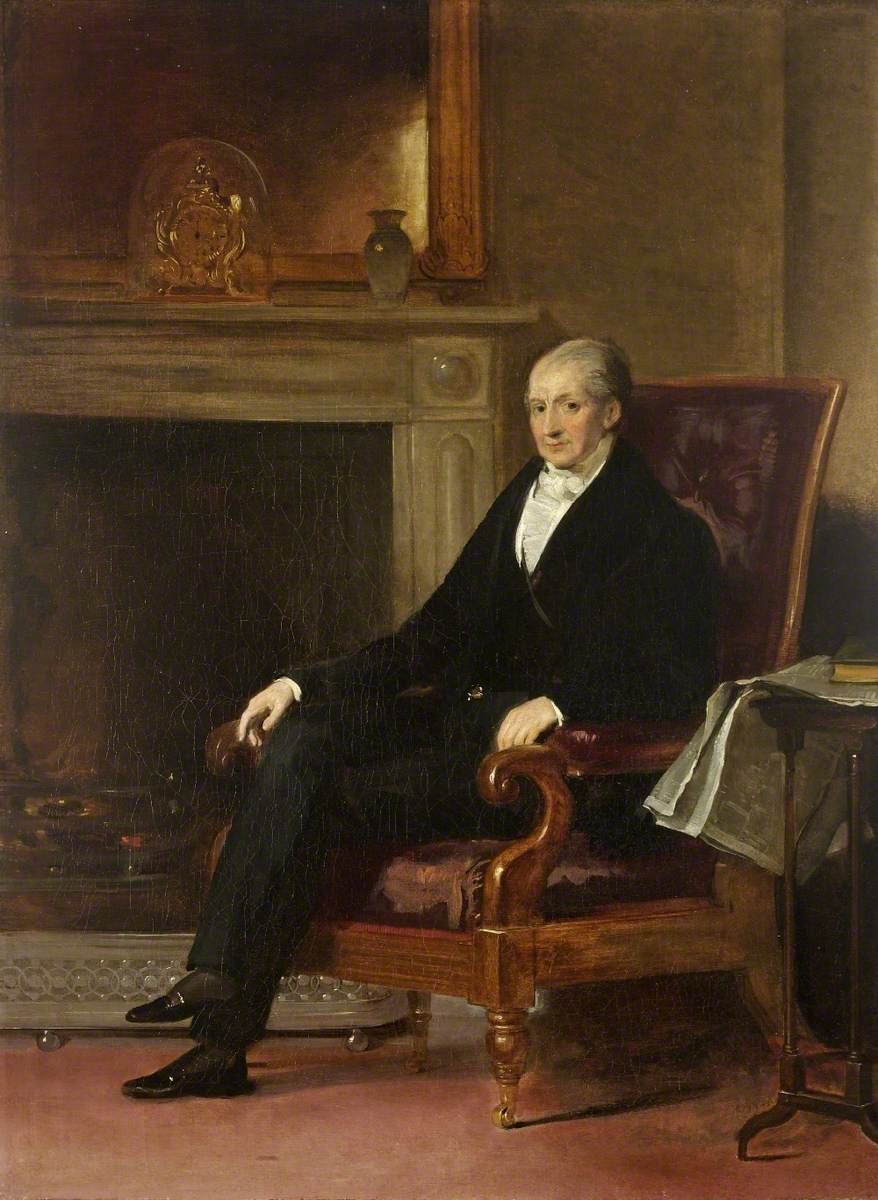
John Dutton, 2nd Baron Sherborne

Arms of Dutton: Quarterly argent and gules, in the second and third quarters a fret or

John Baron Dutton, 2nd Baron Sherborne (24 January 1779 – 18 October 1862), was a British peer.

== Background ==
Sherborne was the son of James Dutton, 1st Baron Sherborne, of Sherborne, Gloucestershire, with his wife Elizabeth Coke, daughter of Wenman Coke and Elizabeth Chamberlayne.

As a result of the Slave Compensation Act 1837, Sherborne was given £3,579 in compensation from the British government as the executor of Sir Rose Price, 1st Baronet, his brother-in-law; Price's estate included the "Worthy Park" slave plantation in Saint John Parish, Jamaica.

== Family ==
Lord Sherborne married Mary Legge, daughter of Henry Bilson-Legge, 2nd Baron Stawell and Mary Curzon, on 11 August 1803.

They had six children:

- James Dutton, 3rd Baron Sherborne (1804–1883), married firstly his cousin Lady Elizabeth Howard (1803–1845), daughter of Thomas Howard, 16th Earl of Suffolk, and Elizabeth Jane Dutton, and secondly Susan Block (1829–1907), daughter of James Block.
- Mary Esther Dutton (1805–1806).
- Elizabeth Dutton (1807–1865), married Henry Reynolds-Moreton, 2nd Earl of Ducie.
- John Thomas Dutton (1810–1884), married Lady Lavinia Parker (1816-1893), daughter of Thomas Parker, 5th Earl of Macclesfield. John Thomas Dutton was the grandfather of Ralph Dutton, 8th Baron Sherborne.
- Anne Constance Dutton (1816–1858), married Admiral Edward Plunkett, 16th Lord Dunsany (1808–1889).
- Ralph Heneage Dutton (1821–1892), married Isabella Mansfield (1826–1895), daughter of John Mansfield and sister of William Mansfield, 1st Baron Sandhurst.

Lord Sherborne died on 18 October 1862, aged 83, and was succeeded in the barony by his son, James. Lady Sherborne died in October 1864.

Peerage of Great Britain
Preceded by James Naper Dutton	Baron Sherborne; 1820–1862	Succeeded by James Henry Dutton
