= Sherborne, Gloucestershire =

Village in Gloucestershire, England

Coordinates: 51.829°N 1.744°W

Sherborne
- Location within Gloucestershire
- Population: 309 (2011)
- OS grid reference: SP1614
- Civil parish: Sherborne
- District: Cotswold
- Shire county: Gloucestershire
- Region: South West
- Country: England
- Sovereign state: United Kingdom
- Post town: Cheltenham
- Postcode district: GL54
- Dialling code: 01451
- Police: Gloucestershire
- Fire: Gloucestershire
- Ambulance: South Western
- UK Parliament: North Cotswolds
- Website: Sherborne Parish Council

Sherborne is a village and civil parish almost 3.5 miles (5.6 km) east of Northleach in Gloucestershire. Sherborne is a linear village, extending more than a mile along the valley of Sherborne Brook, a tributary of the River Windrush.

The place-name 'Sherborne' is first attested in the Domesday Book of 1086, where it is spelt 'Scireburne', and means 'bright stream'. This is a reference to Sherborne Brook.

== Manor and church ==
Sherborne House

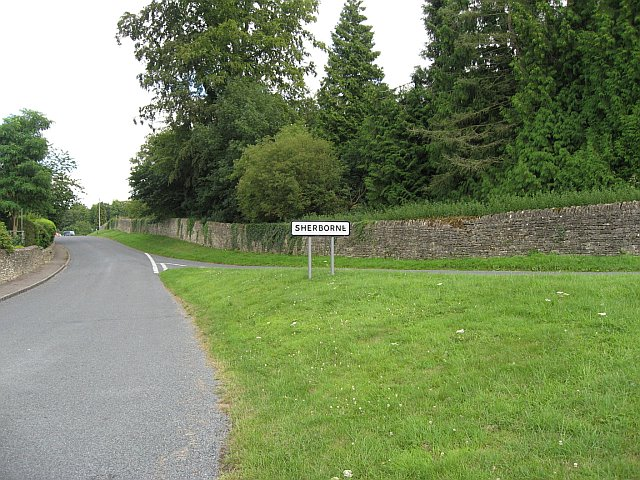
Entrance to Sherborne

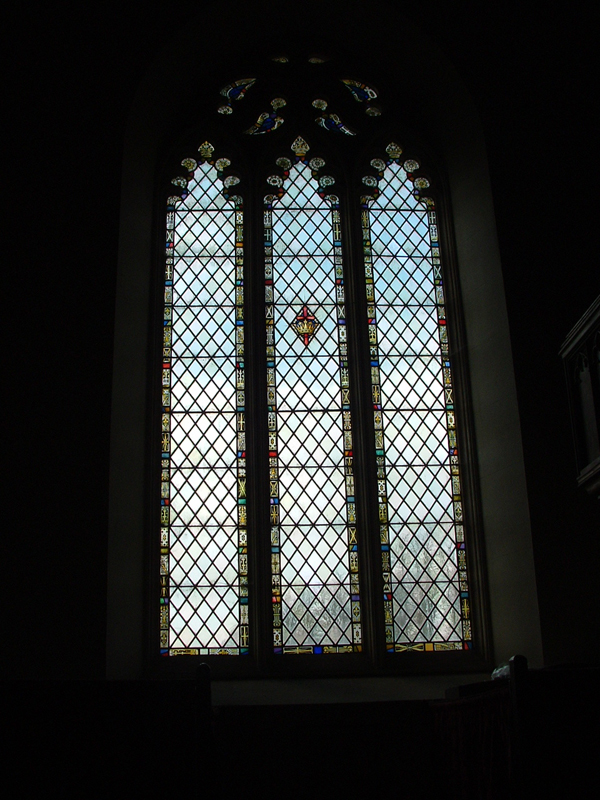
Stained Glass Window of Sherborne Parish Church

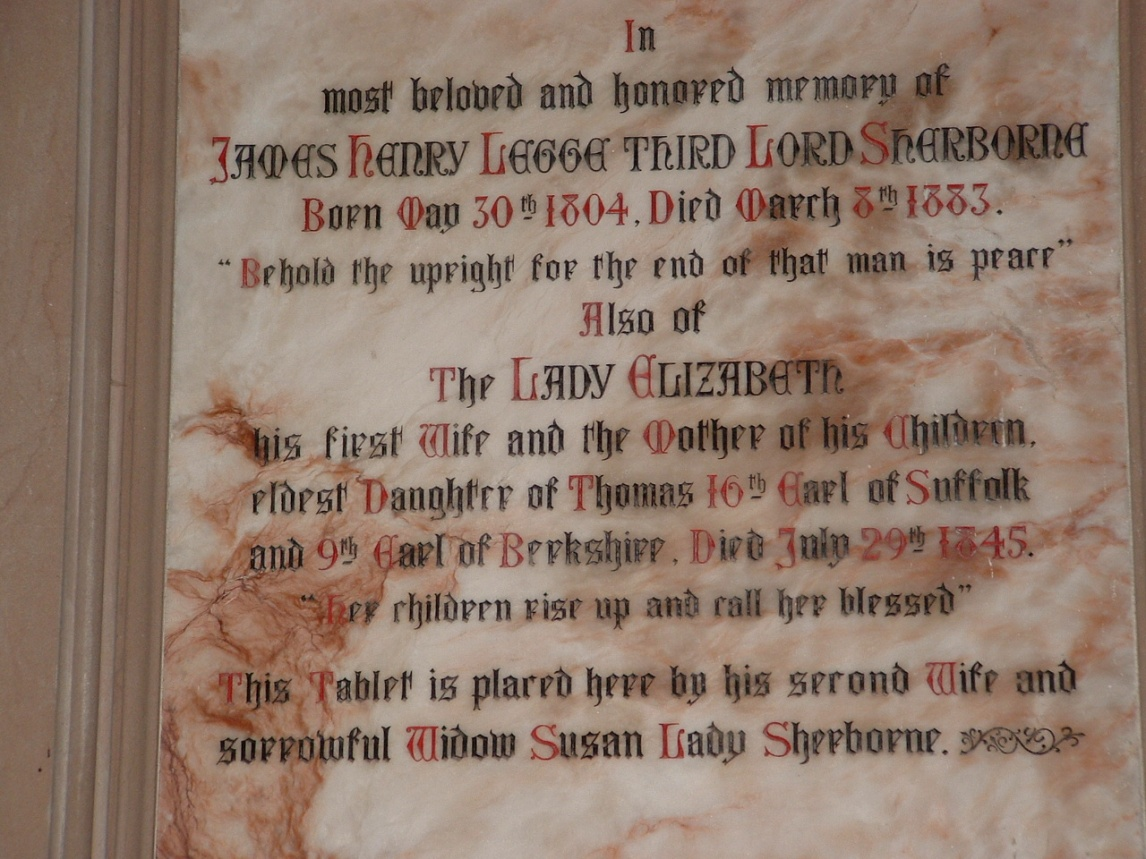
Sherborne Parish Church Memorial to James and Elizabeth Dutton

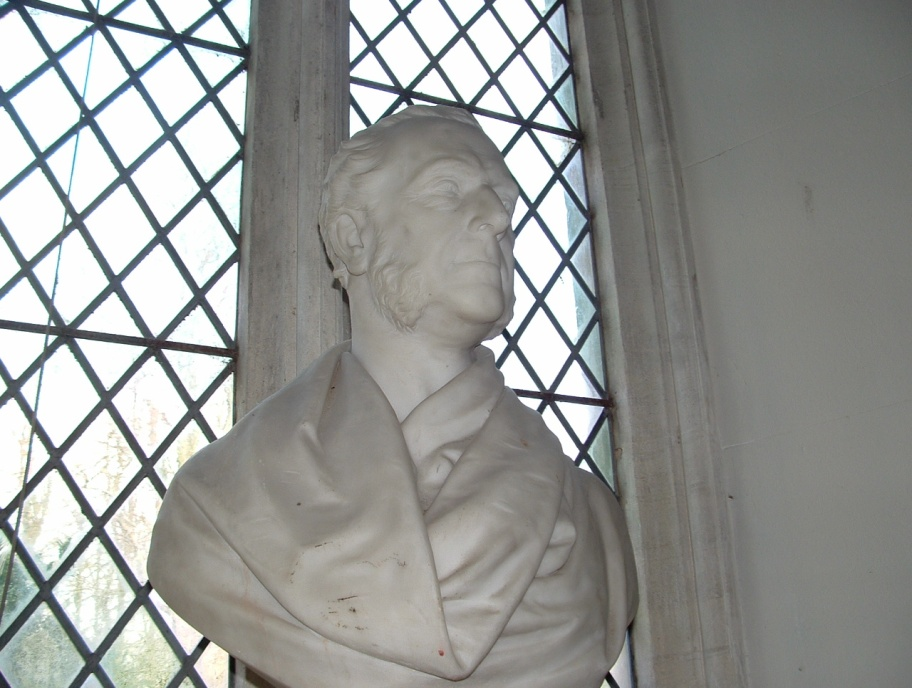
Sherborne Parish Church Bust of James Henry Legge Dutton, 3rd Baron Sherborne

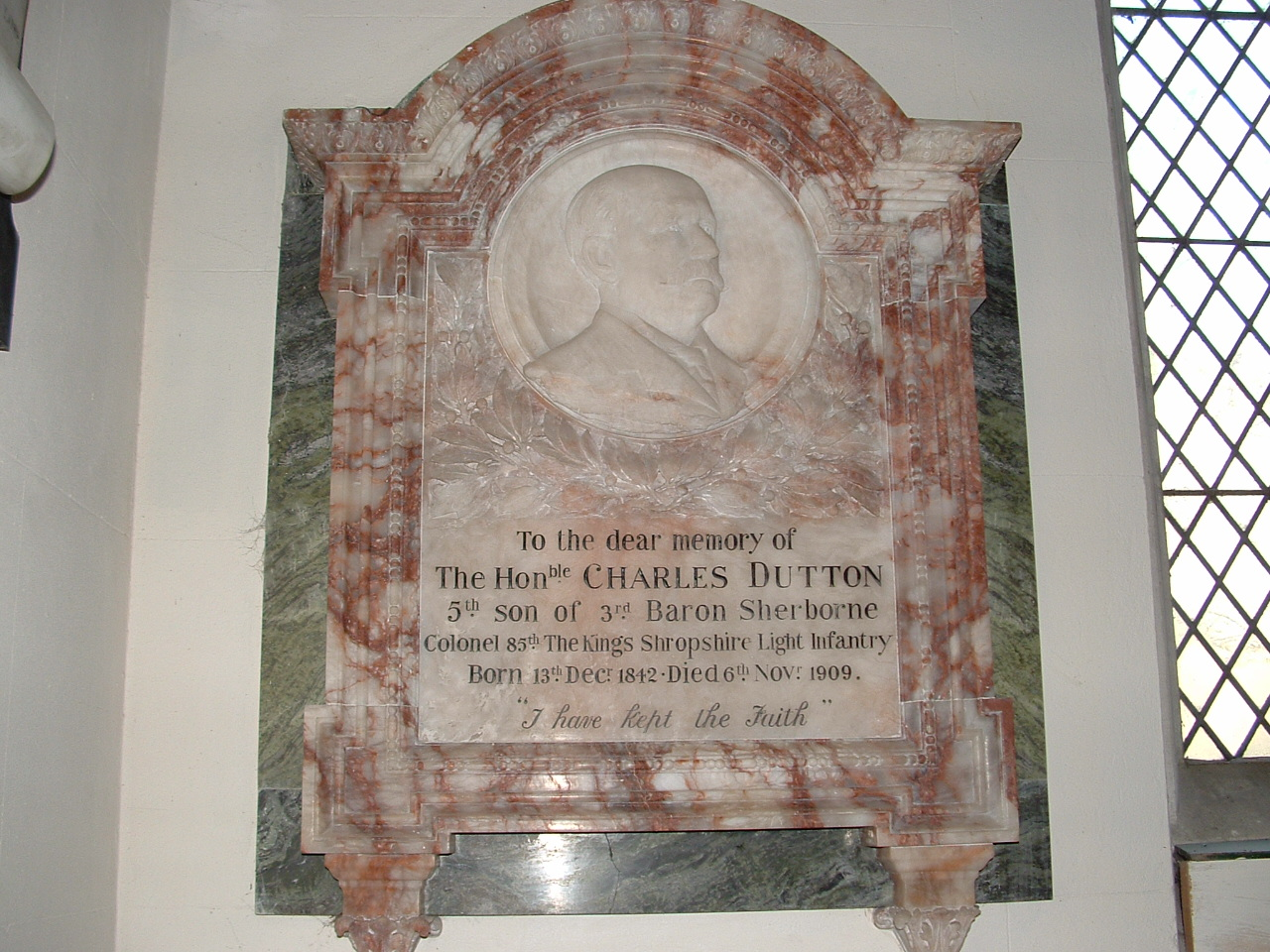
Sherborne Parish Church Memorial to Charles Dutton

Coenwulf of Mercia, who reigned from AD 796 to 821, is credited with giving the manor of Sherborne to Winchcombe Abbey. The Domesday Book records that the abbey held Sherborne in 1086. Edward I stayed in Sherborne in 1382. In 1539 the abbey was suppressed in the dissolution of the monasteries and the Crown took its lands.

Sherborne had a parish church by 1175, when it was listed amongst the property of Winchcombe Abbey. The original church building no longer exists, but a 19th-century cottage at the east end of the village incorporates two Norman doorways and other details said to have been recovered from an orchard at the same end of the village.

The present Church of England parish church of Saint Mary Magdalene is in the centre of the village. Its bell-tower and spire were built late in the 13th or early in the 14th century. The church is next to Sherborne House, which was built for Thomas Dutton after he bought the manor of Sherborne in 1551. Elizabeth I stayed at the house in 1592. John Dutton had the house re-faced in 1651–53, and James Dutton, 1st Baron Sherborne had alterations made to the church between 1743 and 1776, including the addition of a Doric portico. In 1850–59 John Baron Dutton, 2nd Baron Sherborne had the medieval nave and aisle of the church demolished to allow more light into Sherborne House, and had a new nave and sanctuary built further north. The church contains numerous ornate monuments to members of the Dutton family. The tower has a ring of six bells. The oldest is medieval; three more were cast in 1653 and the remaining two are 18th-century.

In 1624–40 John Dutton acquired land 2 miles (3.2 km) southwest of the village to create a deer park. He had The Lodge built as a viewing stand to watch deer being coursed by greyhounds. In 1898 it was extended for Susan, Lady Sherborne and converted into a house. The National Trust now owns the Lodge Park and Sherborne Estate. Sherborne House is converted into privately owned apartments and is not open to the public.

== Economic and social history ==
In 1086 the village had four watermills on Sherborne Brook. By the end of the 19th century only Duckleston Mill, at the west end of the village, remained, and it was disused. In 1961 it was still standing but had been converted into a farmhouse.

The Astronomer Royal James Bradley was born in Sherborne in 1693.

More than half of the parish was farmed under an open field system until 1777, when the common lands were enclosed.

The farmhouse at Stones Farm at the east end of Sherborne village was designed by Richard Pace and built in 1818.

The 2nd Baron Sherborne established two schools for boys in 1824. They were merged in 1862, and a schoolhouse was built for them in 1868. By 1906 it had been enlarged to take 165 pupils, but by 1938 attendance had fallen to 80. By 1961 it was a junior school. It is now a Church of England primary school.

Until the 1880s Sherborne was noted as a centre of Morris dancing.

Sherborne still has a village shop and tea room which incorporates an outreach Post Office.

== Sources ==
- Elrington, C.R. (1964). Victoria County History: A History of the County of Gloucester, Volume 6. pp. 120–127.
- Verey, David (1970). The Buildings of England: Gloucestershire: The Cotswolds. Harmondsworth: Penguin Books. pp. 385–386. ISBN 0-14-071040-X.
