= Cromwell family =

English aristocratic family

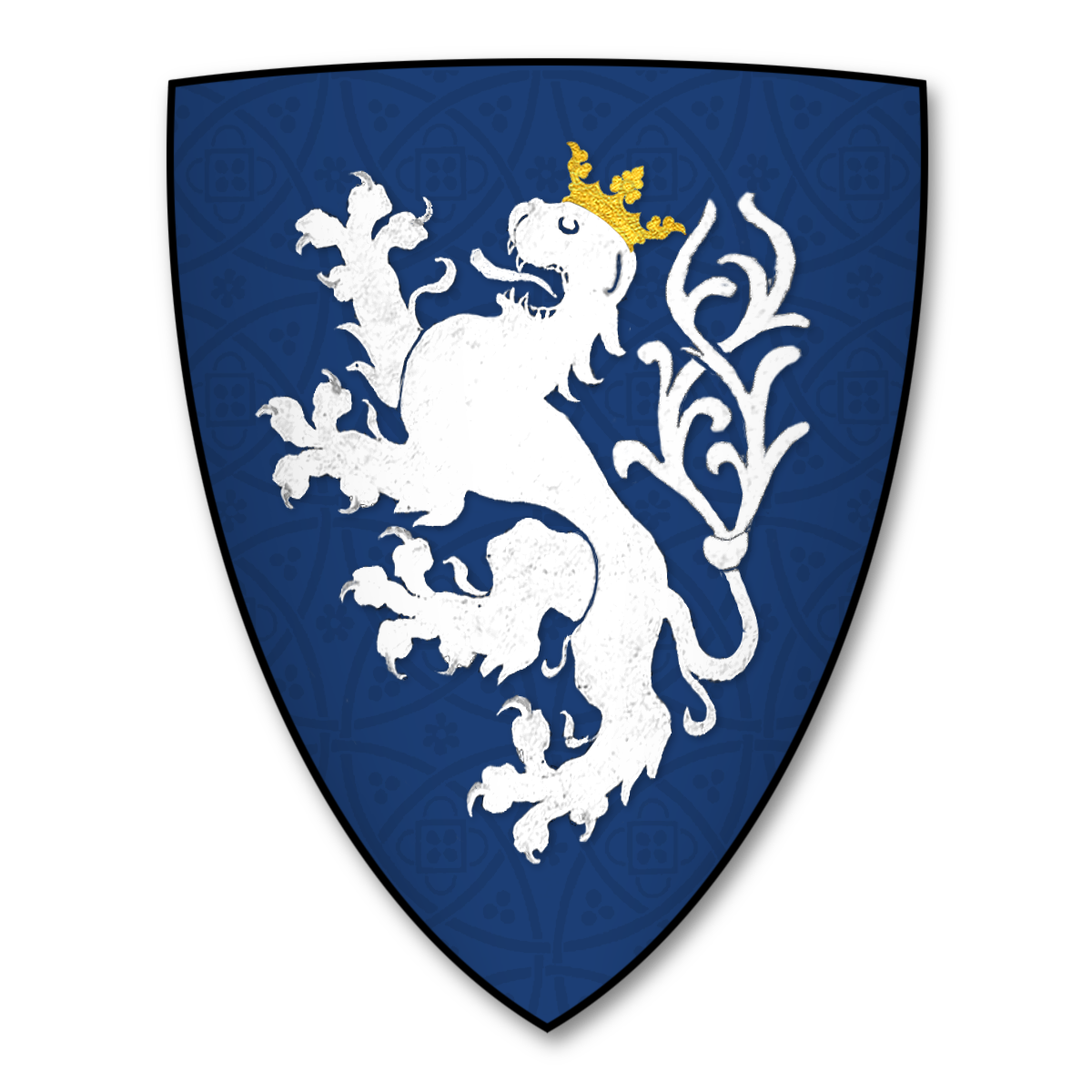
Coat of arms of John de Cromwell

The Cromwell family is an old English aristocratic family, originating in Nottinghamshire.

The family is notable for producing two Lord Protectors of England, Scotland and Ireland: Oliver Cromwell (1653–1658) and his son Richard Cromwell (1658–1659). Aristocratic members of the family descend from Thomas Cromwell, 1st Earl of Essex, and from Oliver Cromwell, whose line traces back to Richard Williams, son of Thomas Cromwell's sister Katherine. The family held several peerages, including the Barony of Cromwell, the Earldom of Essex, and the Earldom of Ardglass.

== History ==
Aristocratic members of the family descend from Thomas Cromwell, 1st Earl of Essex, and Oliver Cromwell, the Lord Protector. The line of Oliver Cromwell descends from Richard Williams (alias Cromwell), son of Thomas Cromwell's sister Katherine and her husband Morgan Williams.

=== Peerages and titles ===
- John de Cromwell 1st Baron Cromwell (created 1308)
- Baron Cromwell of Wimbledon (created 1536, forfeited 1540)
- Earl of Essex (created 1540, forfeited 1540)
- Baron Cromwell (created 1540, extinct 1687)
- Viscount Lecale (created 1624, extinct 1687)
- Earl of Ardglass (created 1645, extinct 1687)
- Lord Protector of England, Scotland and Ireland
  - Oliver Cromwell (1653–1658)
  - Richard Cromwell (1658–1659)

=== Family tree of Walter Cromwell ===
- Walter Cromwell (died ca. 1516/1521) m. Katherine Meverill
  - Katherine Cromwell (died bef. 12 July 1529) m. Morgan Williams (Llanishen, Glamorgan, 1469 – Putney, Derbyshire, bef. 12 July 1529)
    - Sir Richard Williams, alias Cromwell (ca. 1510–1544) m. Frances Murfyn (ca. 1520/1 – ca. 1543)
      - Sir Henry Williams, alias Cromwell (1537–1604) 1st m. Joan Warren (died 1584); 2nd m. Susan Weeks (died 1592)
        - (1) Sir Oliver Cromwell (ca. 1562–1655) 1st m. Elizabeth Bromley (died before 1601); 2nd m. Anne Hooftman (1565–1624)
          - (1) Elizabeth Cromwell (died 1666) 1st m. Henry Neale; 2nd m. Sir Richard Ingoldsby (died 1635)
          - (1) four sons and four daughters
          - (2) nine children
        - (1) Richard Cromwell
        - (1) Robert Cromwell (ca. 1560–1617) m. Elizabeth Steward (ca. 1564–1654)
          - Jane Cromwell m. John Desborough (1608–1680)
          - Catherine Cromwell (born 1597) 1st m. Roger Whitstone; 2nd m. John Jones (ca. 1597–1660)
          - Anne Cromwell m. John Sewster
          - Oliver Cromwell, Lord Protector (1599–1658) m. Elizabeth Bourchier (1598–1665)
            - Robert Cromwell (1621–1639)
            - Oliver Cromwell (1622–1644)
            - Bridget Cromwell (1624–1662) 1st m. Henry Ireton (1611–1651); 2nd m. Charles Fleetwood (ca. 1618–1692)
            - Richard Cromwell, Lord Protector (1626–1712) m. Dorothy Maijor (ca. 1620–1675)
              - Elizabeth Cromwell (1650–1731)
              - Edward Cromwell (1644–1688)
              - Anne Cromwell (1651–1652)
              - Mary Cromwell (born and died 1654)
              - Oliver Cromwell (1656–1705)
              - Dorothy Cromwell (1657–1658)
              - Anna Cromwell (1659–1727) m. Thomas Gibson
              - Dorothy Cromwell (1660–1681) m. John Mortimer
              - Edith Cromwell (1660–1694) m. N. N. Gist
            - Henry Cromwell (1628–1674) m. Elizabeth Russell (died 1687)
              - Henry Cromwell (died 1711) m. Hannah Hewling
              - five sons and two daughters
            - Elizabeth Cromwell (1629–1658) m. John Claypole (1625–1688)
            - James Cromwell (born and died in 1632)
            - Mary Cromwell (1637–1713) m. Thomas Belasyse, 1st Earl Fauconberg (ca. 1627–1700)
            - Frances Cromwell (1638–1720) 1st m. Robert Rich (died 1658) 2nd m. Sir John Russell, 3rd Baronet, of Chippenham (ca. 1632–1669)
        - (1) Dorothy Cromwell m. Thomas Fleming
        - (1) Joan Cromwell (died ca. 1641) m. Sir Francis Barrington, 1st Baronet, of Barrington Hall (ca. 1570–1628)
        - (1) Sir Philip Cromwell
        - (1) Henry Cromwell (c.1566–1630)
          - Elizabeth Cromwell (died before 1645) m. Sir Oliver St. John (ca. 1598–1673)
        - (1) Ralph Cromwell
        - (1) Mary Cromwell (died 1617) m. Sir William Dunch (died 1610/11)
        - (1) Elizabeth Cromwell (ca. 1562–1664) m. William Hampden (born 1570)
        - (1) Frances Cromwell m. Richard Whalley
      - Francis Williams, alias Cromwell (ca. 1541–1598) m. Margaret Mannock
        - Henry Williams, alias Cromwell (born 1565)
  - Thomas Cromwell, 1st Earl of Essex (ca. 1485–1540) m. Elizabeth Wyckes (died 1529)
    - Gregory Cromwell, 1st Baron Cromwell (ca. 1520–1551) m. Elizabeth Seymour (ca. 1518–1568)
      - Henry Cromwell, 2nd Baron Cromwell (1538–1592) m. Mary Paulet (ca. 1540–1592)
        - Edward Cromwell, 3rd Baron Cromwell (ca. 1559–1607) 1st m. Elizabeth Upton (died 1593); 2nd m. Frances Rugge (died 1631)
          - (1) Elizabeth Cromwell (born ca. 1585) 1st m. Sir John Shelton (1559–1606); 2nd m. Thomas Fitzhughes
          - (2) Thomas Cromwell, 1st Earl of Ardglass (1594–1653) m. Elizabeth Meverell (died 1651/53)
            - Lady Mary Cromwell (died 1676) m. William FitzHerbert (1624/29–1597)
            - Wingfield Cromwell, 2nd Earl of Ardglass (1624–1668) m. Mary Russell (before 1634 – after 1687)
              - Thomas Cromwell, 3rd Earl of Ardglass (1653–1682) 1st m. Honora Boyle (died 1710); 2nd m. Mary O'Brien (died 1727)
            - Vere Essex Cromwell, 4th Earl of Ardglass (1625–1687) m. Catherine Hamilton
              - Lady Elizabeth Cromwell (1676–1709) m. Edward Southwell (1671–1730)
            - Hon. Oliver Cromwell
          - (2) Frances Cromwell (1595–1662) m. Sir John Wingfield (ca. 1595–1631)
          - (2) Anne Cromwell (1597–1636) m. Sir Edward Wingfield (died 1638)
        - Sir Gregory Cromwell (born ca. 1561) m. Frances Griffin
        - Catherine Cromwell (1557–1621) m. Sir Lionel Tollemache, 1st Baronet, of Helmingham
      - Edward Cromwell (1539 – before 1553)
      - Thomas Cromwell (ca. 1540–1610/11) m. Katherine Gardner (died 1615/16)
      - Katherine Cromwell (born ca. 1541) m. John Strode (1524–1581)
      - Frances Cromwell (ca. 1544–1562) m. Richard Strode (1528–1581)
    - Anne Cromwell (died ca. 1529)
    - Grace Cromwell (died ca. 1529)
    - (illegitimate daughter) Jane Cromwell (ca. 1530/35–1580) m. William Hough (ca. 1527–1585)
