= Thomas Cromwell (disambiguation) =

Thomas Cromwell (c. 1485–1540) was an English statesman, 1st Earl of Essex, and chief minister of King Henry VIII.

Thomas Cromwell may also refer to:

- Thomas Cromwell (Parliamentary diarist) (c. 1540–c. 1611), grandson of the chief minister, English Member of Parliament
- Thomas Cromwell, 1st Earl of Ardglass (1594–1653), Commander of the Regiment of Horse (Ireland) for King Charles I of England
- Thomas Cromwell, 3rd Earl of Ardglass (1653–1682), English peer
- Thomas Cromwell (antiquary) (1792–1870), English dissenting minister and antiquary
- Thomas Cromwell (jurist) (born 1952), Canadian jurist and Puisne Justice on the Supreme Court of Canada
- Thomas Lord Cromwell, Elizabethan play

== See also ==
- Thomas Y. Crowell (1836–1915), American bookbinder and publisher
