= Edward Southwell =

Edward Southwell may refer to:

- Edward Southwell, 20th Baron de Clifford (1738–1777), British politician
- Edward Southwell Sr. (1671–1730), Irish politician
- Edward Southwell Jr. (1705–1755), Irish politician
