= Elizabeth Southwell =

English noblewoman

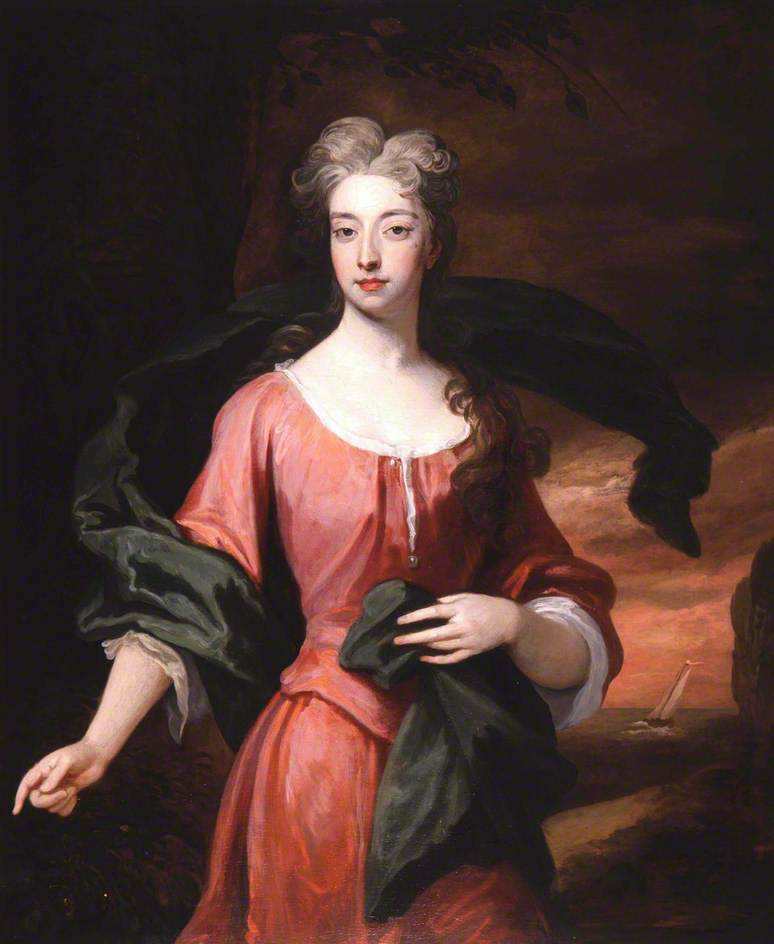
- Elizabeth Southwell in 1705
- Born: 3 December 1674
- Died: 31 March 1709 (aged 34)
- Buried: Henbury
- Noble family: Cromwell
- Spouse: Edward Southwell (m. 1704; died 1709)
- Issue: Edward Southwell
- Father: Vere Essex Cromwell, 4th Earl of Ardglass
- Mother: Catherine Hamilton

Lady Elizabeth Southwell (née Cromwell), called Lady Cromwell (1674–1709) was an English noblewoman, the only daughter of Vere Essex Cromwell, 4th Earl of Ardglass and wife Catherine Hamilton.

== Title ==
When her father died in 1687, she claimed his title of Baroness Cromwell, although his earldom and viscountcy became extinct; she was ranked with the peeresses at the funeral of Queen Mary II and the coronation of Queen Anne, but her claim appears to have been a mistake.

Whether she was entitled to succeed her father depends on how the barony was created. A barony by writ descends to an only daughter, if a baron have no sons; a barony by patent follows the rule of descent given in the patent - normally to the male heirs of the grantee, which would exclude daughters.

The Barony of Cromwell has a patent, granted in 1540 to Gregory Cromwell, 1st Baron Cromwell of Oakham (and his heirs male), son of Henry VIII's Minister Thomas Cromwell, after his father's fall and execution. But the antiquarian William Dugdale had claimed in the 1670s that there was also a writ summoning Gregory Cromwell as Baron Cromwell, dated 28 April 1539. Although he gives a text of the writ, the form is not standard, and no writs at all are recorded as being issued on that day - the first day of Parliament, and so rather late to summon men to attend it; the Complete Peerage conjectures that Dugdale saw a reference to Lord Cromwell in the proceedings of the Parliament, deduced that it meant the son - not the father - and supplied the writ he assumed must exist. Gregory Cromwell was, however, elected as one of the Knights of the Shire for Kent in 1539, and was summoned to Parliament that year to sit in the House of Commons.

== Courtship, marriage, and issue ==
In 1703, Cromwell was courted by Anglo-Virginian planter William Byrd II. While she travelled to Dublin with Edward Southwell, the Secretary of State for Ireland, Byrd wrote a series of letters addressing Cromwell as 'Facetia' and himself as 'Veramour'. Byrd and Southwell were close friends at the time. Southwell's father, Sir Robert Southwell, had secured Byrd's entry into the Royal Society before dying in 1702. Cromwell's replies do not survive, but Byrd's outgoing letters (preserved and published by Marion Tinling) show how he grew irritated as she stopped replying to his persistent and melodramatic letters. Byrd grew angry, lashing out at Cromwell's 'hibernian amuzement' and 'laziness', sabotaging any hopes of a successful courtship.

On 29 October 1704, Cromwell married Edward Southwell in Ireland. Their son, Edward Southwell, did not style himself Baron Cromwell of Oakham. Cromwell's grandson inherited the much older and more distinguished Barony of Clifford as the title's 20th holder.

== Death ==
Elizabeth died of consumption on 31 March 1709 and was buried at Henbury. In a letter to Lord Raby, on 1 April 1709, Lady Wentworth wrote that "Your old Mrs. is dead and left thre lovly boys behynde and a dismall mallancolly husband; its Lady Betty Southwell whoe made a very good wife, and he a fond husband."

== Bibliography ==
- "Ardglass, Earl of (I, 1645 - 1687). Cracroft's Peerage". Cracroftspeerage.co.uk.
- Burke, Bernard (1866). A Genealogical History of the dormant, abeyant, forfeited and extinct peerages of the British Empire. London: Harrison.
- Cartwright, James J., ed. (1883). The Wentworth Papers, 1705-1739. London: Wyman & Sons.
- Cokayne, G. E. (1910). Gibbs, Vicary (ed.). The Complete Peerage of England, Scotland, Ireland, Great Britain and the United Kingdom, Extant, Extinct or Dormant, vol. I. London: St. Catherine Press.
- Cokayne, G. E. (1913). Gibbs, Vicary (ed.). The Complete Peerage of England, Scotland, Ireland, Great Britain and the United Kingdom, vol. III. London: St. Catherine Press.
- "Cromwell, Baron (E, 1540 - 1687)". Cracroftspeerage.co.uk.
- "Elizabeth Cromwell, "Baroness Cromwell", Family Search: Community Trees. British Isles. Peerage, Baronetage, and Landed Gentry Families with Extended Lineage". Histfam.familysearch.org. Archived from the original on 29 October 2013.
- Hawkyard, A. D. K. (1982). "CROMWELL, Gregory (by 1516-51), of Lewes, Suss.; Leeds Castle, Kent and Launde, Leics.". In Bindoff, S. T. (ed.). Members. The History of Parliament: the House of Commons 1509-1558. Historyofparliamentonline.org.
- "House of Lords Journal Volume 1: 28 April 1539". Journal of the House of Lords: volume 1: 1509-1577. British-history.ac.uk.
