= Miles de Courcy =

Irish Jacobite politician

Member of the [[Irish House of Commons Parliament]] for Kinsale
- In office 1689–1689
- Preceded by: St. John Broderick; Randolph Clayton
- Succeeded by: Edward Southwell Sr. Jonas Stawell

Personal details
- Died: c. 1720
- Party: Jacobite
- Spouse: Elizabeth Sadleir
- Children: Gerald de Courcy

Military service
- Allegiance: Kingdom of Ireland (Jacobite)
- Rank: Captain
- Unit: Boiseleau's Regiment of Foot

Miles de Courcy (died c.1720) was an Irish Jacobite politician.

De Courcy was the son of Patrick de Courcy, 13th Baron Kingsale and Mary FitzGerald. A burgess of Kinsale from 1687, in 1689 he was elected as a Member of Parliament for Kinsale in the short-lived Patriot Parliament called by James II of England. During the Williamite War in Ireland, he was a captain in Boiseleau's Regiment of Foot. De Courcy was subsequently attainted, but he was restored to his estates under the Articles of Limerick.

He married Elizabeth Sadleir; their son, Gerald, inherited the title of his cousin, Almeric de Courcy, 23rd Baron Kingsale, in 1720.

Parliament of Ireland
Preceded by St. John Broderick; Randolph Clayton	Member of Parliament for Kinsale; 1689; With: Andrew Murrogh	Succeeded by Edward Southwell Sr. Jonas Stawell
