= Robert Hoblyn =

English politician and book collector

- Born: 5 May 1710
- Died: 17 November 1756 (aged 46)
- Education: Corpus Christi College, Oxford
- Occupations: Politician; Mine owner
- Spouse: Jane (née Coster)
- Parent(s): Francis Hoblyn (1687–1711) and Penelope (née Godolphin)

Robert Hoblyn MP FRS (1710–1756) was an English politician and book collector. He was elected a Fellow of the Royal Society in 1745. He was a Member of Parliament representing the city of Bristol in 1741 and 1747.

== Life ==
Hoblyn was born at Nanswhyden House, and baptised at St. Columb Major in Cornwall 5 May 1710. His father, Francis Hoblyn, born in 1687, a J.P. for Cornwall and a member of the Stannary parliament, was buried at St Columb on 9 November 1711. His mother was Penelope, daughter of Colonel Sidney Godolphin of Shropshire. She married secondly, on 5 September 1714, Sir William Pendarves of Pendarves.

Hoblyn was educated at Eton College, matriculated at Corpus Christi College, Oxford, on 18 December 1727, took a B.C.L. degree in 1734, and in the same year contributed verses to the Epithalamia Oxoniensia. He sat as one of the members for the city of Bristol from 24 November 1742 to 8 April 1754, and was appointed speaker of two convocations of the Stannary parliament in Cornwall. He was elected a fellow of the Royal Society 13 June 1745, and admitted 24 October.

Early in life Hoblyn travelled in Italy, where he collected scarce books. He inherited a fortune, increased by the returns from the Herland copper mine in Gwinear parish, west Cornwall. With his wealth he restored his ancestral home, Nanswhyden House, employing Potter as the architect. This building was described in William Borlase's Natural History of Cornwall, 1758, p. 90, pl. viii., engraved at the expense of Mrs Jane Hoblyn. He delighted in building and collecting books, and destroyed documents relating to the cost. The books were divided into the classes of natural and moral philosophy. He made a manuscript catalogue in which he marked with a star those works which were not in the Bodleian Library. Clergymen and persons of literary tastes had access to the library.

Hoblyn died at Nanswhyden House on 17 November 1756. His monument in St Columb Church bears a long inscription.

== Marriage and legacy ==
Hoblyn married Jane, only daughter of Thomas Coster, a Bristol merchant. She remarried in 1759 John Quicke of Exeter. The estates under the entail went to the issue male of Thomas Hoblyn of Tresaddern, while the library went to Quicke.

In 1768 Quicke printed the library catalogue in two volumes, as Bibliotheca Hobliniana sive Catalogus Librorum juxta exemplar quod manu sua maxima ex parte descriptum reliquit Robertus Hoblyn, Armiger de Nanswhyden in Comitatu Cornubiæ. An edition in one volume appeared in 1769. Thomas Frognall Dibdin says in referring to it:

‘I know not who was the author of the arrangement of this collection, but the judicious observer will find it greatly superior to everything of its kind, with hardly even the exception of the “Bibliotheca Croftsiana”’ (Bibliomania, pp. 74, 497).

The books were sold in London in 1778, and produced about £2,500. Nanswhyden House was destroyed by fire on 30 November 1803, with its collections of ancient documents, the records relating to the Stannary parliament, and a cabinet of minerals.

Parliament of Great Britain
| Preceded by Edward Southwell; Sir Abraham Elton, Bt | Member of Parliament for Bristol; 1742–1754; With: Edward Southwell 1742–54 | Succeeded by Richard Beckford; Robert Nugent |
