= Down Cathedral =

Cathedral in Downpatrick, Northern Ireland

Coordinates: 54.327061°N 5.722547°W

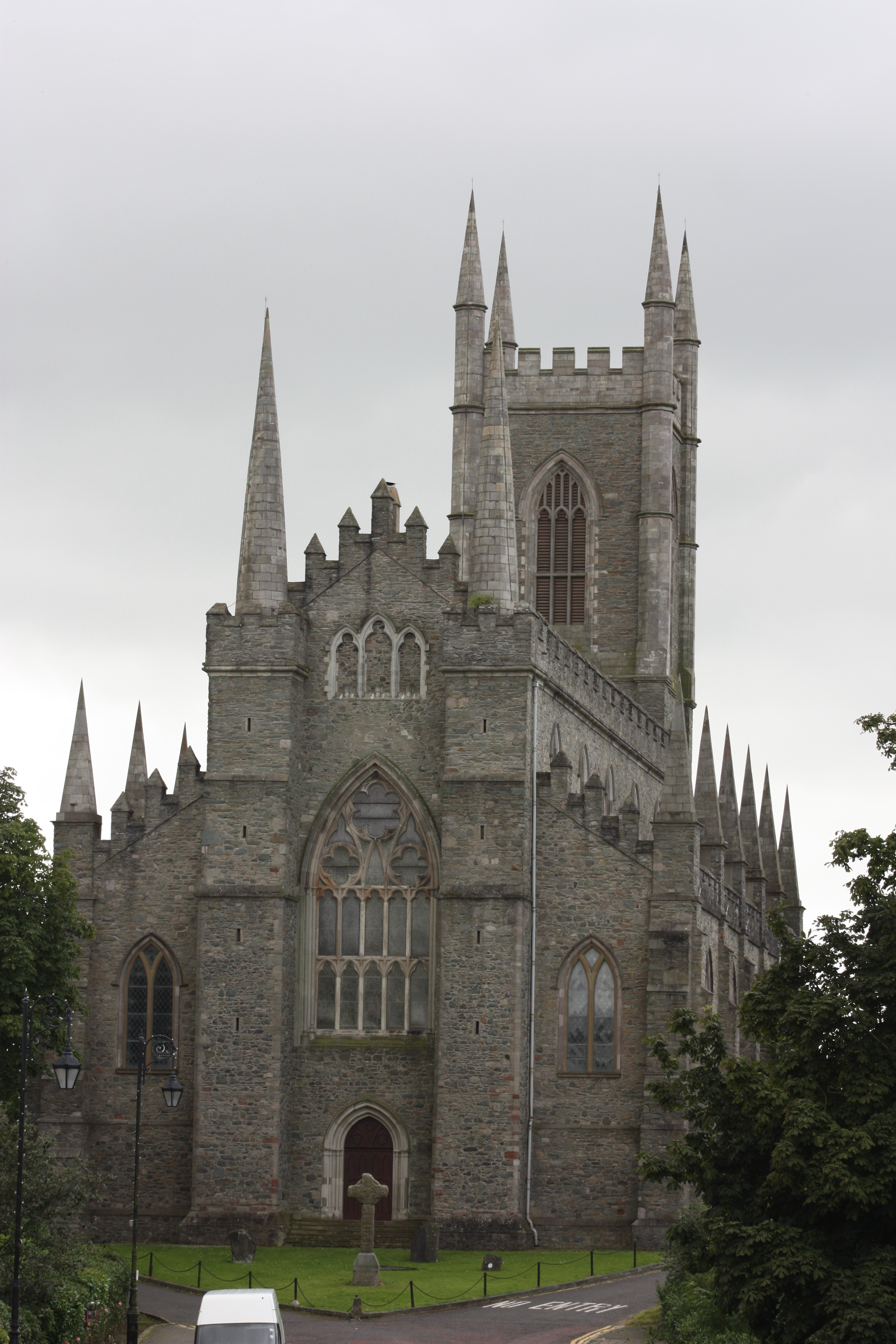
Down Cathedral, August 2009

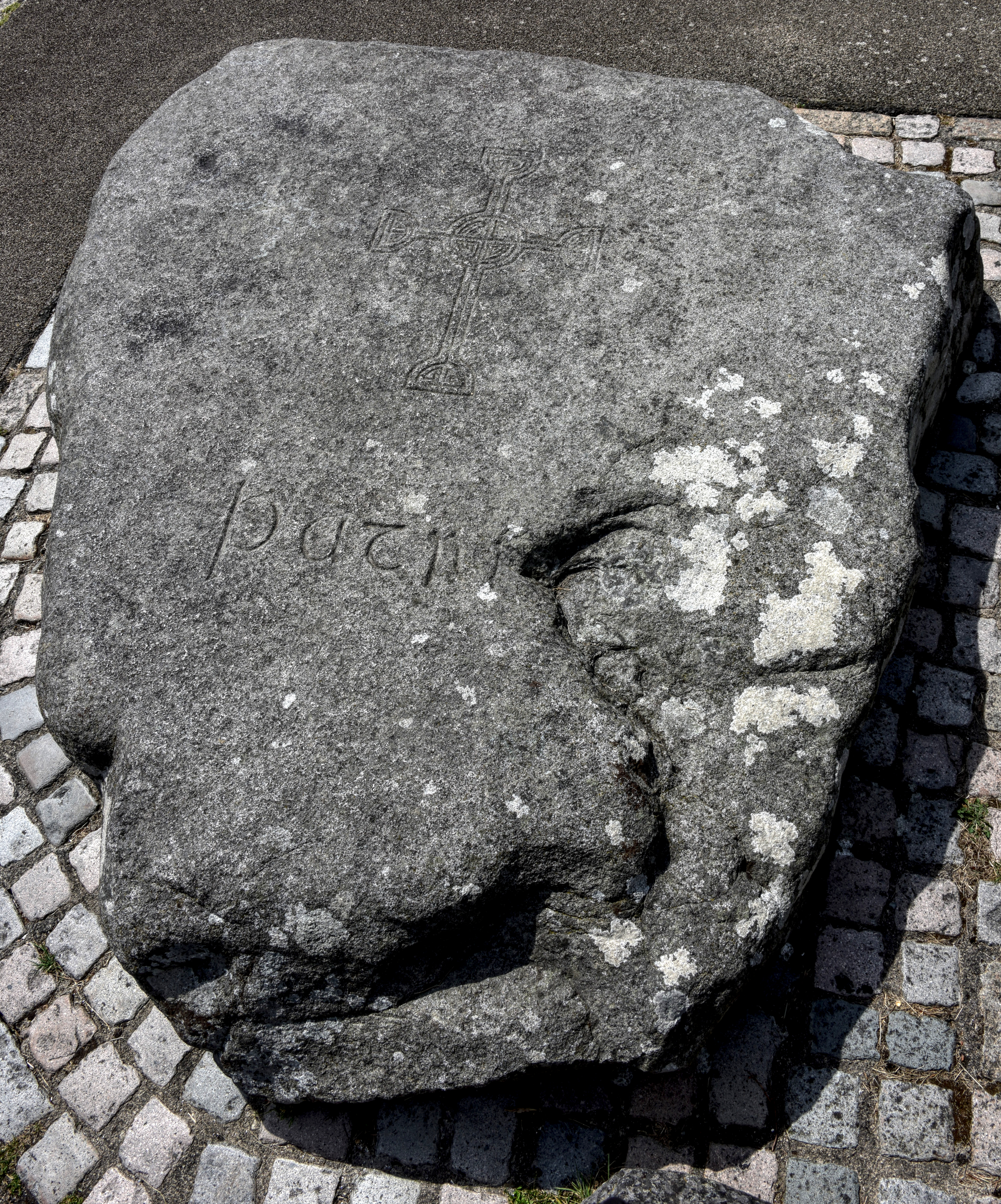
The reputed burial place of Saint Patrick.

Down Cathedral, the Cathedral Church of the Holy and Undivided Trinity, is a Church of Ireland cathedral located in the town of Downpatrick in Northern Ireland. It stands on Cathedral Hill overlooking the town. It is one of two cathedrals in the Diocese of Down and Dromore (the other is Dromore Cathedral). The cathedral is the centre point of Downpatrick, a relatively new name for the settlement, having only come into usage in the seventeenth century.

== History ==
The annals record that St Fergus was the first bishop of Down and there are good historical reasons to connect him, from about the end of the sixth century, to the broad area of mid-Down.

Although not as ancient or carrying such well-attested historical importance as nearby Bangor Abbey, there is little doubt that in the period of the Celtic church, when monasticism was such a hallmark of Christian settlements, that a community of monks lived on – or near – the hill overlooking the Quoile.

These would have been wooden buildings and only by the tenth century would stone built buildings have existed, in part due to developing technology. The annals record various attacks, not all of which were successful, on the community at Down in the early eleventh century.

The cathedral is dedicated to the Holy Trinity, a dedication first recorded in the 12th century.

In 1124 St Malachy became Bishop of Down, and set about repairing and enlarging the cathedral. In 1177, Sir John de Courcy (Norman conqueror of Ulster) brought in Benedictine monks and expelled the older monastic community. De Courcy, who had enraged the king by his seizure of lands in Ireland beyond what he was granted, was taken prisoner there on Good Friday 1204. According to the account, the unarmed de Courcy managed to take a weapon from one of his attackers and killed 13 men before being overpowered and taken prisoner.

The royal charter was granted to Down Cathedral on 20 July 1609.

John Wesley visited Downpatrick four times between 1778 and 1789 and on each occasion preached in the Grove on the hill of Down Cathedral. A memorial stone marking his mission can be seen there today.

=== Restoration ===
The cathedral incorporates parts of the 13th-century church of the Benedictine Abbey of Down (Black Monks). It lay in ruins after the dissolution of the monastery in 1541.

Down Cathedral Act 1790
- Act of Parliament
- Parliament of Ireland
- Long title: An Act for the more effectual Application of the Sum of One Thousand Pounds, granted by King's Letter, for the Support and Repair of the Cathedral Church of Down, and for defraying the Expences of the Celebration of Divine Worship therein.
- Citation: 30 Geo. 3. c. 43 (I)

Dates
- Royal assent: 5 April 1790

The restoration of the ruined 14th-century cathedral of Downpatrick was initiated after an act of the Irish Parliament, the Down Cathedral Act 1790 (30 Geo. 3. c. 43 (I)), granted I£1,000 (approximately £120,000 in 2025) for the purpose. It reopened for divine service on 23 August 1818. Work on a tower started later, and it was finally consecrated in 1829.

Crosses from the 9th, 10th and 12th centuries are preserved in the cathedral. The building today is mainly the original chancel from the 15th century, with a vestibule and tower added. It had a second major restoration from 1985 to 1987, during which time the cathedral was closed.

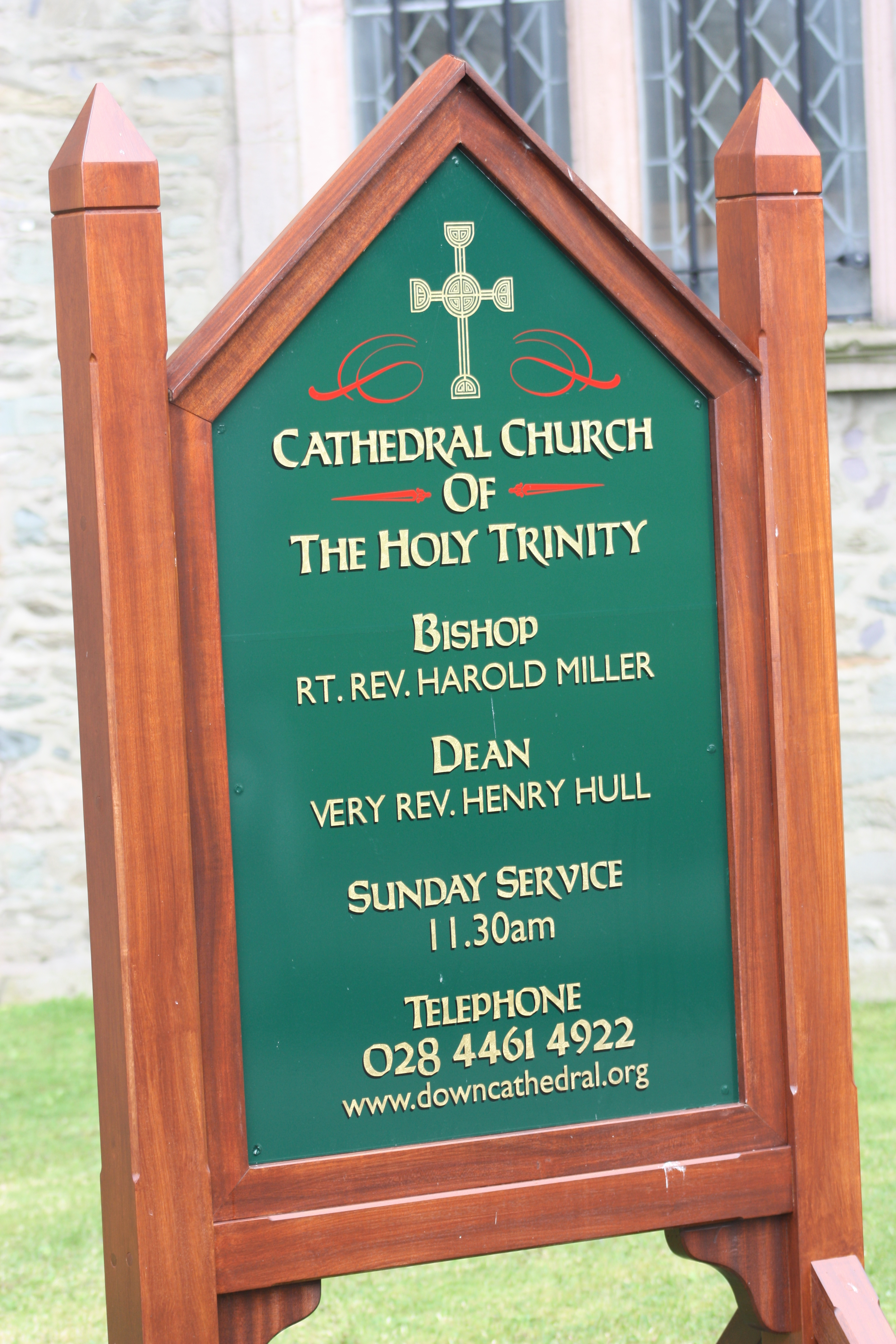
Down cathedral, August 2009

== Burials ==
- Edward Cromwell, 3rd Baron Cromwell
- Vere Essex Cromwell, 4th Earl of Ardglass

== Today ==
It houses an 11th-century granite font discovered in use as a watering trough in 1927 and installed in the cathedral in 1931. In the cathedral grounds is the burial place of St Patrick, believed to have died in 461. However, the inscribed stone of Mourne granite allegedly marking the grave was actually put in place in 1900. Outside the east end of the cathedral stands the replica of a weathered high cross made of granite. The 10th- or 11th-century original, which formerly stood in the centre of Downpatrick and was moved to the cathedral in 1897, has been on display in Down County Museum since 2015.

Two small stone crosses now built into a wall in Down Cathedral appear to be 12th-century work and are carved with monks holding books.
