= Edward Southwell Sr. =

Anglo-Irish lawyer and politician (1671-1730)

Edward Southwell PC (Ire)
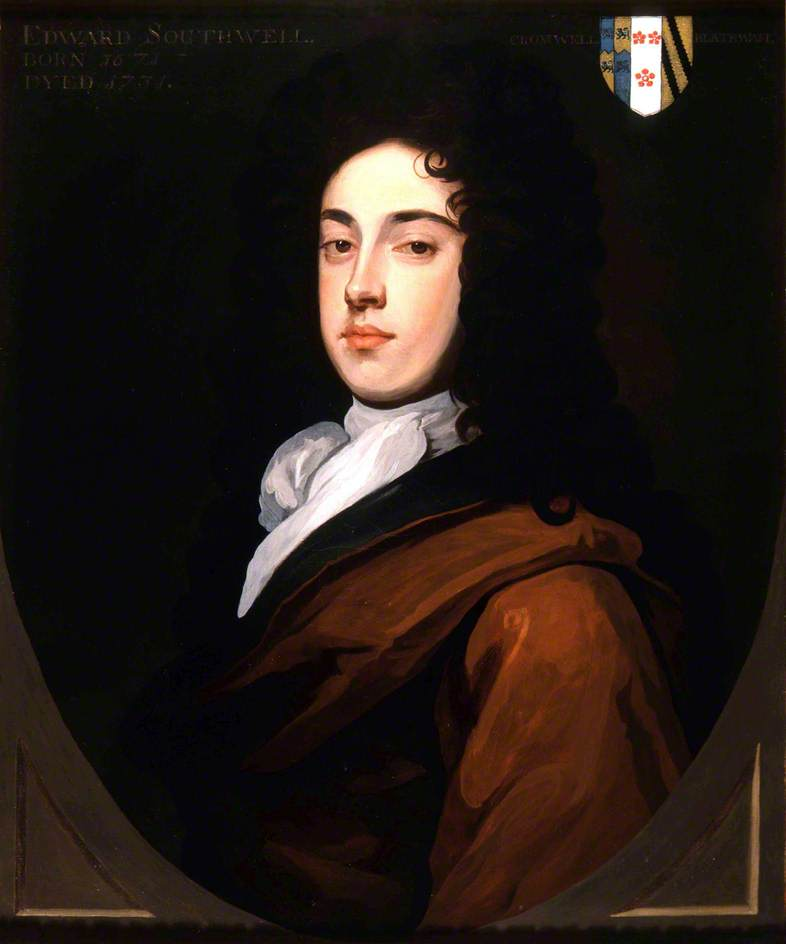
- Edward Southwell Sr. in 1702

Secretary of State
- In office 1702–1730
- Preceded by: Sir Robert Southwell
- Succeeded by: Edward Southwell

Personal details
- Born: 4 September 1671 Kings Weston, Bristol, England
- Died: 4 December 1730 (aged 59) Kings Weston, Bristol, England
- Spouse(s): Elizabeth Cromwell (m. 1704; died 1709) Anne Blathwayt (m. 1716; died 1717)
- Children: Edward Southwell
- Parents: Robert Southwell (father); Elizabeth Dering (mother)
- Relatives: Edward (son)
- Education: Kensington School, London
- Alma mater: Merton College, Oxford, England

Edward Southwell Sr. PC (Ire) (4 September 1671 – 4 December 1730) was an Anglo-Irish lawyer and Tory politician.

== Early life ==
He was the second but only surviving son of Sir Robert Southwell of Kings Weston, near Bristol.

He was educated at Kensington School, Lincoln's Inn (1686) and Merton College, Oxford (1687).

== Career ==
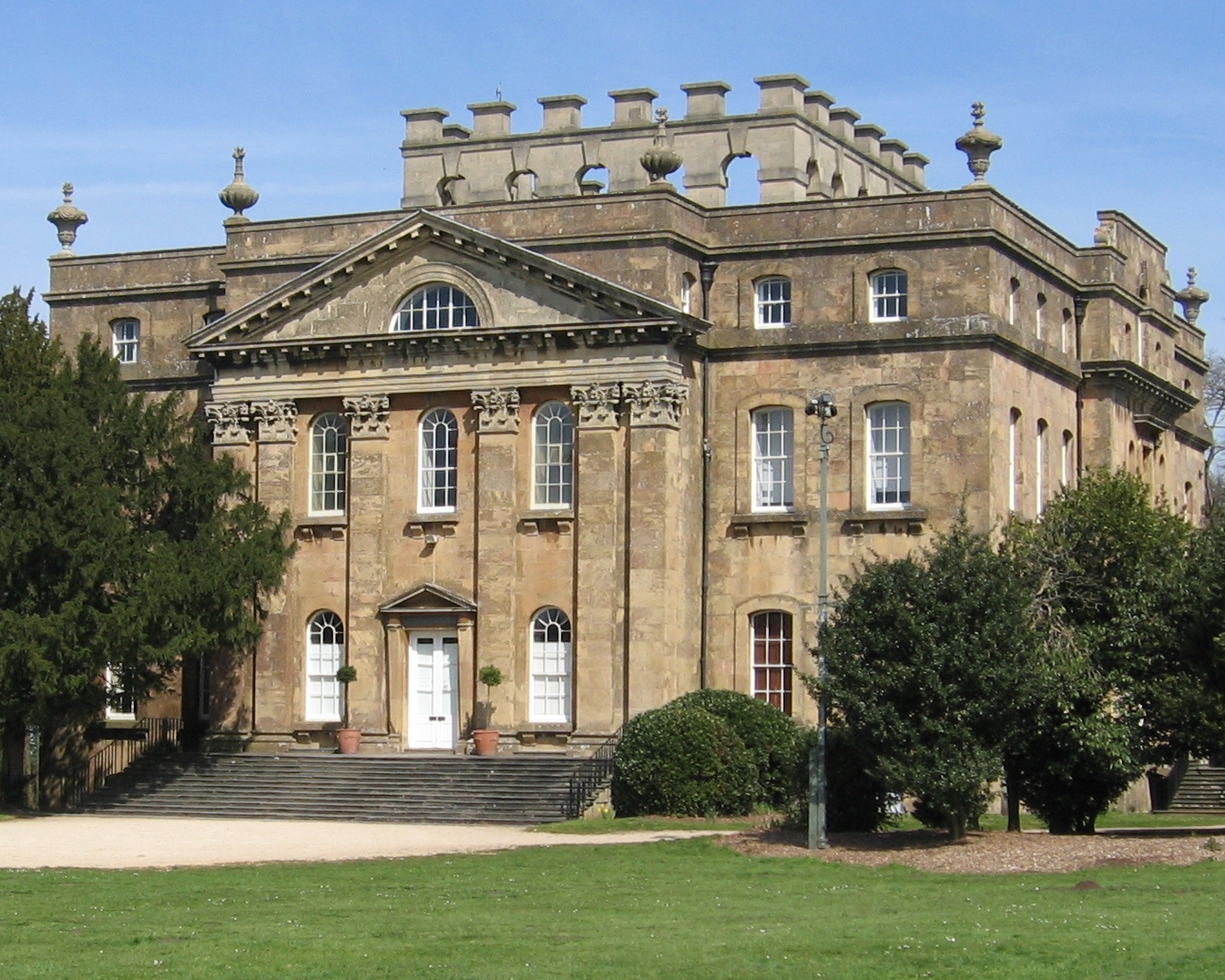
Kings Weston House, Bristol

He served in a number of high public offices including Chief Prothonotary of the Common Pleas in Ireland (1692–1700), clerk of the Privy Council (1693 to death), judge of the Admiralty court and vice-admiral of Munster (1699 to death). He was several times joint commissioner of the Privy Seal (1701–1702, 1715 and 1716). He was elected a Fellow of the Royal Society in 1692 and twice served on their council.

He sat in the Irish House of Commons for Kinsale from 1692 to 1699, for Dublin University from 1703 to 1713 and then again for Kinsale from 1713 to his death.

In 1702 Southwell succeeded his father as Principal Secretary of State (Ireland) and was appointed to the Privy Council of Ireland the same year. Both appointments were for life.

He sat in the House of Commons of England and the House of Commons of Great Britain between 1702 and 1715 as MP for Rye, Tregony and Preston.

== Personal life ==
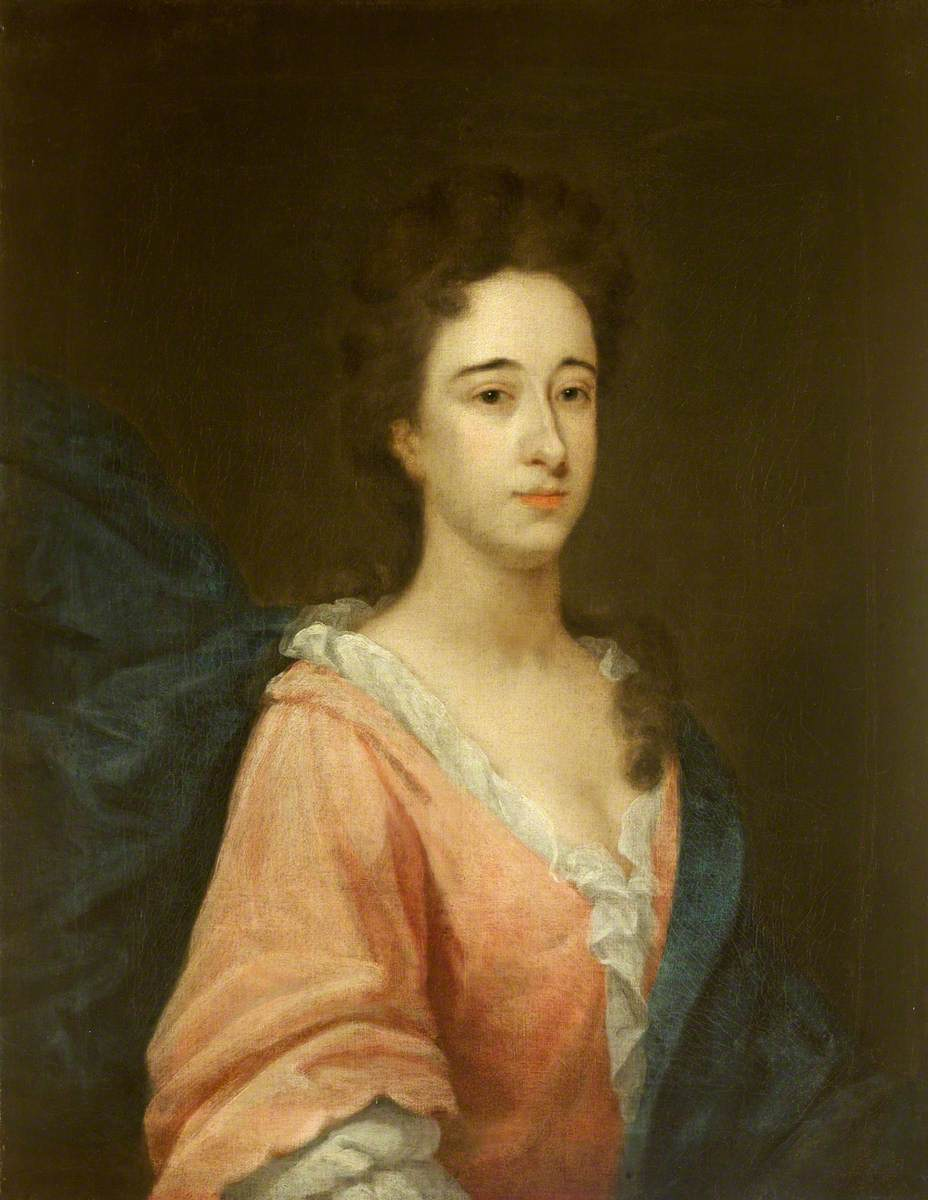
Portrait of his second wife, Anne Blathwayt, c. 1710–1717

He had married Elizabeth Cromwell, 8th Baroness Cromwell, the daughter and heiress of Vere Essex Cromwell, 4th Earl of Ardglass and Catherine Hamilton. Before her death in 1709, they were the parents of:

- Edward Southwell (1705–1755), who married Lady Katherine Watson, a daughter of Edward Watson, Viscount Sondes and Lady Katherine (née Tufton), in 1729.

In 1712 he commissioned Sir John Vanbrugh to build Kings Weston House in Kingsweston, Bristol. After the death of his first wife, he married Anne Blathwayt (1691–1717), daughter of William Blathwayt of Dyrham Park, Gloucestershire, in 1716. Sadly, she died the following year.

He died in 1730 and was buried at Kingsweston. His son Edward from his first marriage, succeeded in turn to the Secretaryship and to the Kings Weston estate.

=== Descendants ===
Through his son Edward, he was a grandfather of Edward Southwell, who later became the 20th Baron de Clifford.

== Works ==
Before entering political office, Southwell translated Henry More's ethical treatise Enchiridion Ethicum from Latin into English, published by Benjamin Tooke as An Account of Virtue in 1690 and regarded as an exemplary literary exercise. Tooke published a second edition in 1701, and Tooke's son Samuel added a third in 1723, excising the names of both More and Southwell and changing the title to An Epitome of Ethics or A Short Account of the Moral Virtues for the Use of Schools.

Parliament of Ireland
Preceded by Andrew Murrogh; Miles de Courcy	Member of Parliament for Kinsale; 1692–1703; With: Jonas Stawell 1692–95; James Weller 1695–1703	Succeeded by William Southwell; Henry Hawley
Preceded by William Crowe; Richard Aldworth	Member of Parliament for Dublin University; 1703–1713; With: Sir William Robinson	Succeeded by Marmaduke Coghill; John Elwood
Preceded by William Southwell; Henry Hawley	Member of Parliament for Kinsale; 1713–1731; With: Henry Hawley to 1725; Anthony Stawell 1725; Sir Richard Meade, Bt from 1725	Succeeded by Gervais Parker; Sir Richard Meade, Bt
Parliament of England
Preceded by Joseph Offley; Thomas Fagg	Member of Parliament for Rye; 1702–1707; With: Thomas Fagg to 1705; Philip Herbert from 1705	Succeeded by Parliament of Great Britain
Parliament of Great Britain
Preceded by Parliament of England	Member of Parliament for Rye; 1707–1708; With: Philip Herbert to December 1707; Phillips Gybbon from December 1707	Succeeded by Phillips Gybbon; Sir John Norris
Preceded by Viscount Rialton; George Robinson	Member of Parliament for Tregony; April 1713 – September 1713; With: George Robinson	Succeeded by James Craggs; Sir Edmund Prideaux, Bt
Preceded by Sir Henry Hoghton, Bt; Henry Fleetwood	Member of Parliament for Preston; 1713–1715; With: Henry Fleetwood	Succeeded by Sir Henry Hoghton, Bt; Henry Fleetwood
Political offices
Preceded by Sir Robert Southwell	Secretary of State; 1702–1730	Succeeded by Edward Southwell
Preceded by Francis Gwyn	Chief Secretary for Ireland; 1703–1707	Succeeded by George Dodington
Preceded by Joseph Addison	Chief Secretary for Ireland; 1710–1713	Succeeded by Sir John Stanley
