= Earl of Ardglass =

The title Earl of Ardglass (pronounced "Ar-glass") was created in the Peerage of Ireland on 15 April 1645. The Earl held the subsidiary titles of Baron Cromwell (Peerage of England, 18 December 1540) and Viscount Lecale (Peerage of Ireland, 22 November 1624). All three titles became extinct in 1687.

== Barons Cromwell (1540) ==
- Gregory Cromwell, 1st Baron Cromwell (1514–1551)
- Henry Cromwell, 2nd Baron Cromwell (1538–1592)
- Edward Cromwell, 3rd Baron Cromwell (1559–1607)
- Thomas Cromwell, 4th Baron Cromwell (1594–1653) (created Viscount Lecale in 1624 and Earl of Ardglass in 1645)

== Earls of Ardglass (1645) ==
- Thomas Cromwell, 1st Earl of Ardglass (1594–1653)
- Wingfield Cromwell, 2nd Earl of Ardglass (1622–1668)
- Thomas Cromwell, 3rd Earl of Ardglass (1653–1682)
- Vere Essex Cromwell, 4th Earl of Ardglass (1623–1687)
