= John de Courcy, 21st Baron Kingsale =

Irish baron (died 1667)

John de Courcy
- Baron Kingsale
- Tenure: 1663–1667
- Predecessor: Patrick de Courcy, 20th Baron Kingsale
- Successor: Patrick, 22nd Baron (a child)
- Died: 19 May 1667
- Spouse: Ellen MacCarthy Reagh
- Issue Detail: Patrick, Almeric, & others
- Father: Patrick de Courcy, 20th Baron Kingsale
- Mother: Mary FitzGerald

John de Courcy, 21st Baron Kingsale (died 1667) sat in the House of Lords of the Irish Parliament of 1661–1666.

== Birth and origins ==
Family tree

John de Courcy with wife, parents, and other selected relatives. (Note: This family tree is based on a tree of the later barons Kingsale and on genealogies of the de Courcy family)

John de Courcy; 18th Baron d. 1628	Mary; O'Crowly
Gerald de Courcy; 19th Baron d. c. 1642	Patrick de Courcy; 20st Baron d. 1663	Mary; FitzGerald	David de Courcy
John de Courcy; 21st Baron d. 1667	Ellen; MacCarthy; Reagh	Miles de Courcy	Elizabeth; Sadleir	Anthony de Courcy d. 1727
Patrick de Courcy; 22nd Baron; Kingsale; 1660–1669	Almeric de Courcy; 23rd Baron; Kingsale; 1664–1720	Anne; Dring d. 1724	Gerald de Courcy; 24th Baron; 1700–1759	Miles de Courcy
John de Courcy; 25th Baron; 1717–1776	Martha; Heron

Legend

XXX	Subject of the article	XXX	Baron; Kingsale

John was born the eldest son of Patrick de Courcy and Mary FitzGerald. His father was the 20th Baron Kingsale (also counted as the 19th or the 15th). His father's family, the de Courcys, were Old English and claimed descendence from John de Courcy, who had arrived in Ireland in 1176.

His mother was a daughter of John Oge FitzGerald of Dromana. Her eldest sister, Helen (or Ellen) was the wife of his uncle Gerald, the 19th Baron Kingsale. The FitzGeralds of Dromana were Old English like the de Courcys. They were a cadet branch of the FitzGeralds of Desmond that started when Gerald FitzGerald, the second son of James FitzGerald, 6th Earl of Desmond (d. 1462) was given Dromana as an appanage.

His parents married when his father was already 48 years old but had 23 children. However, only seven seem to be known by name.

John listed among his known brothers
He was the eldest of four known brothers:
1. John (d. 1667)
2. Edmund died without issue
3. Miles, married Elizabeth Sadleir and was father of Gerard de Courcy, 24th Baron Kingsale.
4. Gerald, died without issue

John's known sisters
1. Alice, married Dermod MacCarthy of Anglish
2. Elizabeth, married David Sarsfield, 3rd Viscount Sarsfield
3. Margaret, married Phillip Barry Oge

== Early life ==
His father was Baron Kingsale from about 1642 to 1663, during the 11 years of war that followed the Irish Rebellion of 1641, then through the eight years of Cromwellian rule in Ireland, and last through the Restoration.

== Marriage and children ==
De Courcy married Ellen, daughter of Charles MacCarthy Reagh of Kilbrittain and granddaughter of Donal MacCarthy Reagh of Kilbrittain.

John and Ellen had three sons:

1. Patrick (1660–1669), succeeded as the 22nd Baron
2. Almeric (1664–1720), succeeded as the 23rd Baron
3. William

—and at least one daughter:

1. Ellen, married Sir John Magrath, 3rd Baronet

== 21st Baron ==
John succeeded his father in 1663 as the 21st Baron Kingsale. He took his seat in the Irish House of Lords as Lord Kingsale on 9 November 1665.

== Death ==
Kingsale died of smallpox on 19 May 1667. He was succeeded by his eldest son Patrick aged seven.

== Notes and references ==
=== Sources ===
- Burke, Bernard (1866). A Genealogical History of the Dormant, Abeyant, Forfeited and Extinct Peerages of the British Empire (New ed.). London: Harrison. OCLC 11501348.
- Burke, Bernard; Burke, Ashworth Peter (1915). A Genealogical and Heraldic History of the Peerage and Baronetage, the Privy Council, Knightage and Companionage (77th ed.). London: Harrison. OCLC 1155471554.
- Cokayne, George Edward (1892). Complete Peerage of England, Scotland, Ireland, Great Britain and the United Kingdom, Extant, Extinct, or Dormant. Vol. IV (1st ed.). London: George Bell and Sons. OCLC 1180828941. – G to K (for Kingsale)
- Cokayne, George Edward (1902). Complete Baronetage, 1611 to 1800. Vol. II (1st ed.). Exeter: William Pollard & Co. OCLC 866278985. – 1625 to 1649 (for Magrath)
- Cokayne, George Edward (1929). Doubleday, H. A. (ed.). The complete peerage of England, Scotland, Ireland, Great Britain and the United Kingdom, extant, extinct, or dormant. Vol. VII (2nd ed.). London: St Catherine Press. – Hussey to Lincolnshire
- D'Alton, John (1855). Illustrations, historical and genealogical, of King James's Irish army list, 1689. Dublin: Published by the author. OCLC 838655763.
- Lainé, P. Louis (1836). "Mac-Carthy". Archives généalogiques et historiques de la noblesse de France [Genealogical and Historical Archives of the Nobility of France] (in French). Vol. Tome cinquième. Paris: Imprimerie de Bethune et Plon. pp. 1–102. OCLC 865941166.
- Lodge, John (1789). Archdall, Mervyn (ed.). The Peerage of Ireland or, A Genealogical History of the Present Nobility of that Kingdom. Vol. VI. Dublin: James Moore. OCLC 264906028. – Viscounts, barons
- O'Hart, John (1892). Irish Pedigrees: Or, the Origin and Stem of the Irish Nation. Vol. II (5th ed.). Dublin: James Duffy & Co. OCLC 7239210. – Normans, English, Huguenots etc.

Peerage of Ireland
Preceded by Patrick de Courcy	Baron Kingsale; 1663–1667	Succeeded by Patrick de Courcy
