= Almeric de Courcy, 23rd Baron Kingsale =

Buried in Westminster Abbey (died 1720)

Almeric de Courcy
- Baron Kingsale
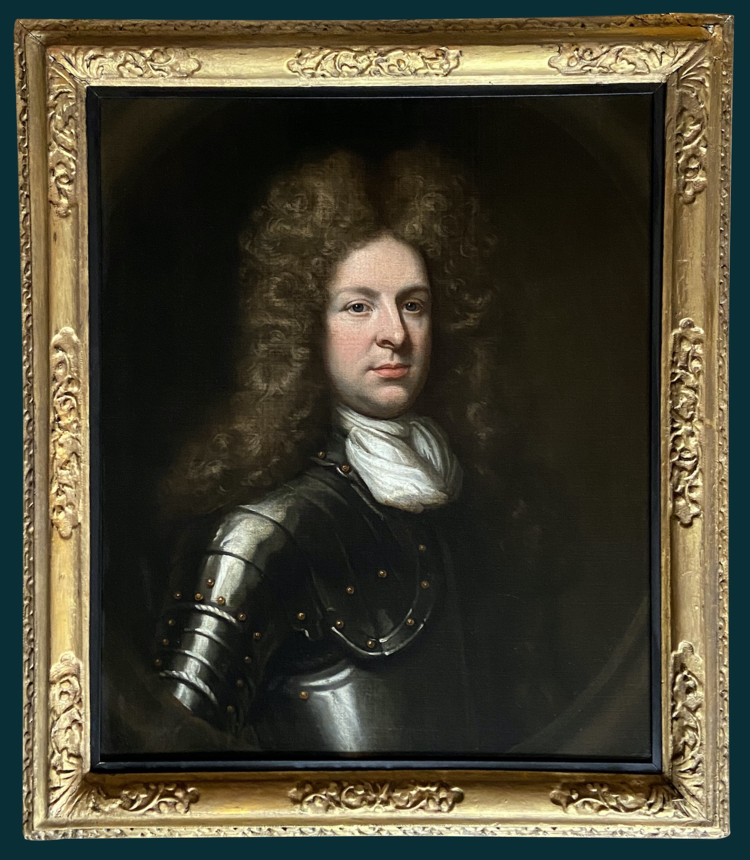
- Detail from the portrait below
- Tenure: 1669–1720
- Predecessor: Patrick, 22nd Baron (a child)
- Successor: Gerald, 24th Baron Kingsale
- Born: May 1664
- Died: 9 February 1720 (aged 55)
- Buried: Westminster Abbey
- Spouse: Anne Dring
- Father: John, 21st Baron Kingsale
- Mother: Ellen MacCarthy Reagh

Almeric de Courcy, 23rd Baron Kingsale (1664–1720) was an Irish Jacobite.

== Birth and origins ==
Almeric was born in May 1664, the second son of John de Courcy and his wife Ellen MacCarthy Reagh. His father was the 21st Baron Kingsale. His father's family, the de Courcys, were Old English and claimed descendence from John de Courcy, who had arrived in Ireland in 1176. Almeric's first name evokes Almeric Tristram, a liegeman of John de Courcy and remote ancestor of the Earls of Howth.

His mother was a daughter of Charles MacCarthy Reagh. Her father's family were the MacCarthy Reagh, a Gaelic Irish dynasty that branched from the MacCarthy-Mor line with Donal Gott MacCarthy, a medieval King of Desmond, or with Donal Maol Cairprech MacCarthy, the first independent ruler of Carbery.

He had two brothers (Note: His elder brother Patrick succeeded as the 22nd Baron Kingsale, and a younger Brother William about whom not much is known.) and at least one sister, who are listed in his father's article.

Family tree

Almeric de Courcy with wife, parents, and other selected relatives. (Note: This family tree is based on a tree of the later barons Kingsale and on genealogies of the de Courcy family)

John de Courcy; 18th Baron d. 1628	Mary; O'Crowly
Gerald de Courcy; 19th Baron d. c. 1642	Patrick de Courcy; 20th Baron d. 1663	Mary; FitzGerald	David de Courcy
John de Courcy; 21st Baron d. 1667	Ellen; MacCarthy; Reagh	Miles de Courcy	Elizabeth; Sadleir	Anthony de Courcy d. 1727
Patrick de Courcy; 22nd Baron; Kingsale; 1660–1669	Almeric de Courcy; 23rd Baron; Kingsale; 1664–1720	Anne; Dring d. 1724	Gerald de Courcy; 24th Baron; 1700–1759	Miles de Courcy
John de Courcy; 25th Baron; 1717–1776	Martha; Heron

Legend

XXX	Subject of the article	XXX	Baron; Kingsale

== Baron Kingsale ==
On 19 May 1667 his elder brother Patrick, a seven-year-old child, succeeded their father as 17th or 22nd Baron. However, Patrick's tenure lasted only two years. Almeric succeeded him in 1669 as the 18th or 23rd Baron Kingsale. King Charles II had bestowed a pension of £300 yearly on the 22nd Baron, which was carried over to him.

== Early life ==
Kingsale was raised a Catholic by his parents but was then sent to Oxford for a Protestant education. Kingsale studied under Doctor John Fell, Dean of Christ Church and Bishop of Oxford. In a letter written in 1678 Fell complained that Kingsale was "addicted to the tennis court, proof against all Latin assaults and prone to kicking, beating and domineering over his sisters; ... fortified in the conceit that a title of honour was support enough, without the pedantry and trouble of book-learning."

On 6 December 1681 Kingsale fought a duel with Charles Livingston, 2nd Earl of Newburgh and had Patrick Sarsfield as his second.

When the Catholic King James II acceded the throne in 1685, he continued Kingsale's pension. Kingsale served as a captain in a troop of horse in the Irish army, later becoming Lieutenant Colonel of Patrick Sarsfield's regiment of horse. In 1689 he sat in the House of Lords of the Patriot Parliament.

He was attainted in 1691 but obtained the reversal of his attainder in 1692.

He sat in the House of Lords of the Irish parliament of 1692–1693, taking his seat on 25 October 1692.

In 1692 he exercised before William III his privilege, supposed to have been granted to his ancestor John in 1203, to remain covered before the king. He probably did this in London as William had left Ireland on 5 September 1690.

== Marriage ==
On 2 March 1698 Kingsale married Anne, daughter of Robert Dring, of Isleworth, Middlesex, at St Martin, Ludgate, London, in an Anglican ceremony.

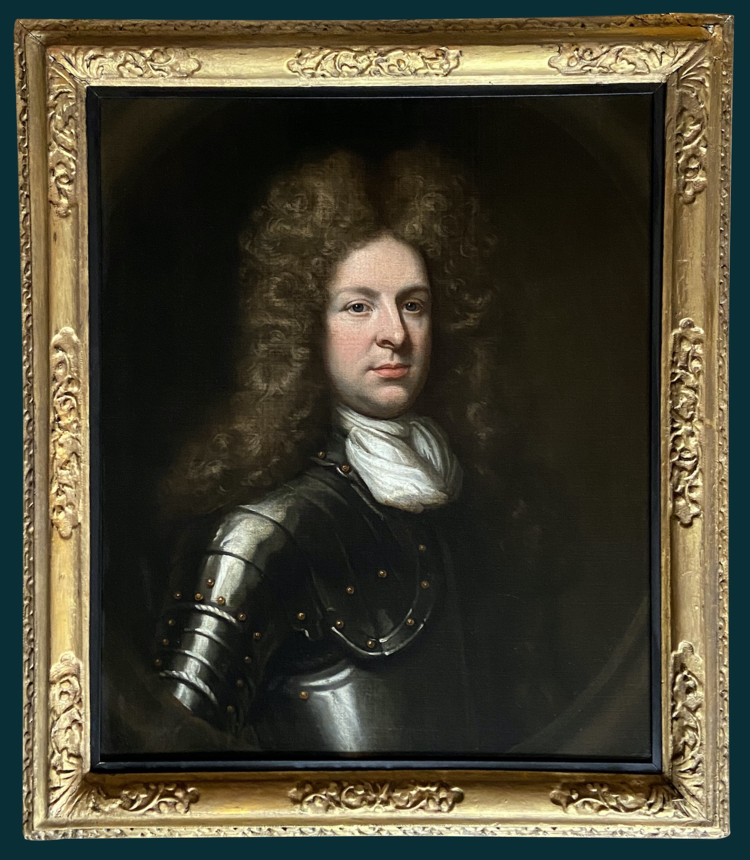
Almeric de Courcy

== Later life ==
Kingsale sat again in the House of Lords during the Irish Parliament of 1703–1713 on 20 May 1712.

== Death ==
Kingsale died childless on 9 February 1720 aged 55 and was buried in Westminster Abbey. His wife died on 25 April 1724. In her will, she provided for a monument to her husband. This took the form of a mural with a life-size effigy under a canopy that still stands in the north choir aisle. Its large size might be explained by the sympathy for Jacobites entertained by the then dean, Francis Atterbury.

Kingsale was succeeded by his cousin, Gerald de Courcy, 24th Baron Kingsale, the son of Miles de Courcy.

Shield of the de Courcy family.

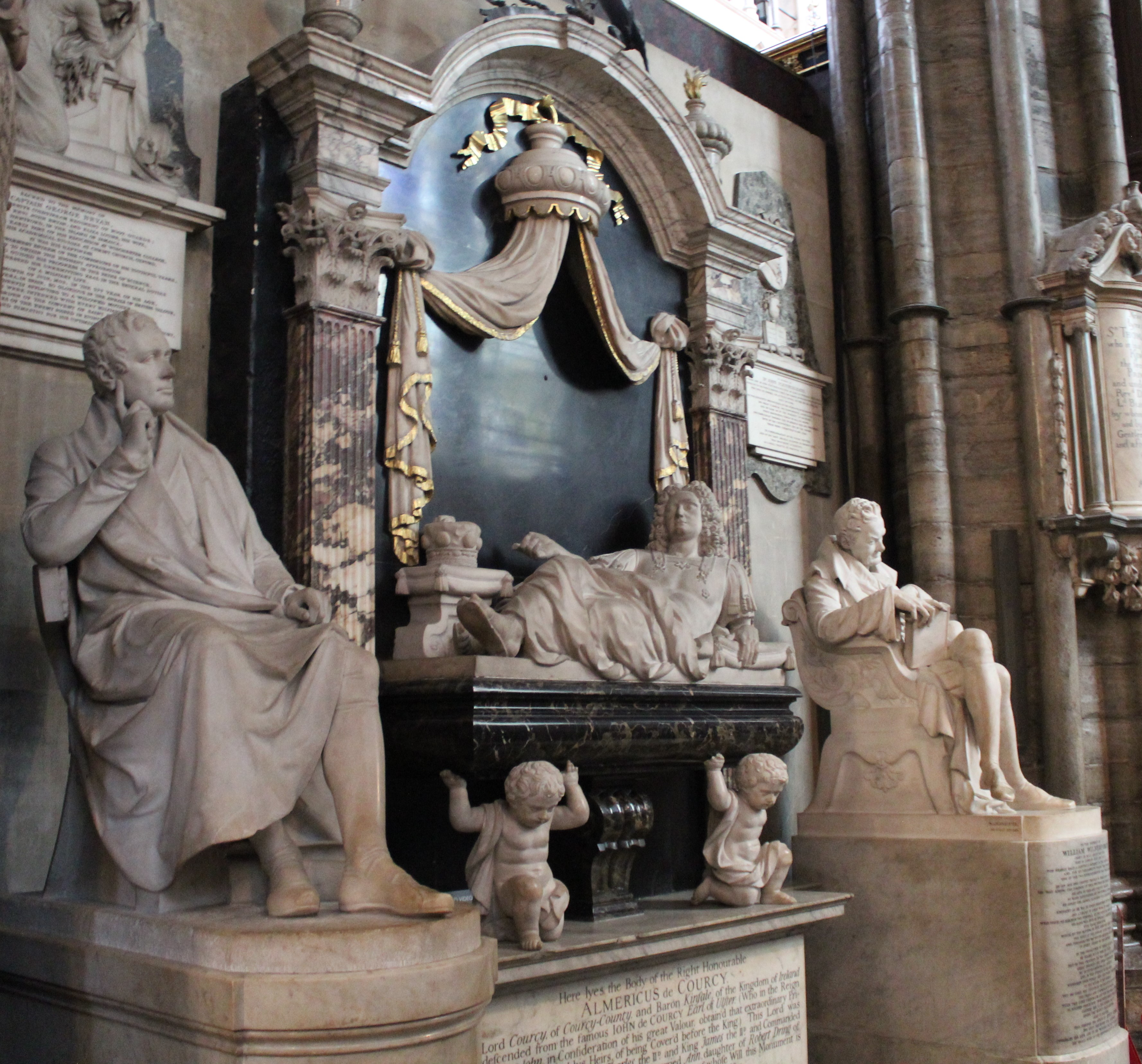
Monument in Westminster Abbey.

== Notes and references ==
=== Sources ===
Subject matter monographs:

- Click here. Wills 1841 in Lives of Illustrious and Distinguished Irishmen

—

- Brayley, Edward Wedlake (1823). The History and Antiquities of the Abbey Church of St. Peter, Westminster. Vol. II. London: J. P. Neale. OCLC 1045990167. – Monuments
- Burke, Bernard; Burke, Ashworth Peter (1909). A Genealogical and Heraldic History of the Peerage and Baronetage, the Privy Council, Knightage and Companionage (71st ed.). London: Harrison. OCLC 28297274.
- Chester, Joseph Lemuel (1876). Registers of Westminster Abbey. London: Private Edition. OCLC 1140248. – Marriages, baptisms and burials from about 1660 to 1875
- Cokayne, George Edward (1892). Complete Peerage of England, Scotland, Ireland, Great Britain and the United Kingdom, Extant, Extinct, or Dormant. Vol. IV (1st ed.). London: George Bell and Sons. OCLC 1180828941. – G to K (for Kingsale)
- Cokayne, George Edward (1902). Complete Baronetage, 1611 to 1800. Vol. II (1st ed.). Exeter: William Pollard & Co. OCLC 866278985. – 1625 to 1649 (for Magrath)
- Cokayne, George Edward (1913). Gibbs, Vicary (ed.). The complete peerage of England, Scotland, Ireland, Great Britain and the United Kingdom, extant, extinct, or dormant. Vol. III (2nd ed.). London: St Catherine Press. OCLC 228661424. – Canonteign to Cutts (for Appendix D: Peers Present in and Absent from James II's Irish Parliament)
- Cokayne, George Edward (1929). Doubleday, H. A. (ed.). The complete peerage of England, Scotland, Ireland, Great Britain and the United Kingdom, extant, extinct, or dormant. Vol. VII (2nd ed.). London: St Catherine Press. – Hussey to Lincolnshire
- D'Alton, John (1855). Illustrations, historical and genealogical, of King James's Irish army list, 1689. Dublin: Published by the author. OCLC 838655763.
- Fryde, Edmund Boleslaw; Greenway, D. E.; Porter, S.; Roy, I., eds. (1986). Handbook of British Chronology. Royal Historical Society Guides and Handbooks, No. 2 (3rd ed.). London: Offices of the Royal Historical Society. ISBN 0-86193-106-8. – (for timeline)
- Gibson, Charles Bernard (1861). The History of the County and City of Cork. Vol. II. London: Thomas C. Newby. OCLC 1046522071. – 1603 to 1860
- James, Francis Godwin (1995). Lords of the Ascendancy: The Irish House of Lords and its Members, 1600–1800. Dublin: Irish Academic Press. ISBN 0-7165-2529-1.
- Lodge, John (1789). Archdall, Mervyn (ed.). The Peerage of Ireland or, A Genealogical History of the Present Nobility of that Kingdom. Vol. VI. Dublin: James Moore. OCLC 264906028. – Viscounts, barons
- O'Hart, John (1892). Irish Pedigrees: Or, the Origin and Stem of the Irish Nation. Vol. II (5th ed.). Dublin: James Duffy & Co. OCLC 7239210. – Normans, English, Huguenots etc.
- Smith, Emily Tennyson (1906). The Roll-Call of Westminster Abbey (4th ed.). London: Smith, Elder, & Co. OCLC 1084583331.
- Smith, George Albert (1872). A Historical Description of Westminster Abbey: Its monuments and Curiosities (4th ed.). London: Jas. Truscott & son. OCLC 934734386.
- Wauchope, Piers (1992). Patrick Sarsfield and the Williamite War. Dublin: Irish Academic Press. ISBN 978-0-7165-2476-2. – (Snippet view)
- Wills, Rev. James (1841). "Almericus de Courcy, Baron Kingsale". Lives of Illustrious and Distinguished Irishmen, from the earliest times to the present period. Vol. IV. Dublin: MacGregor, Polson & Co. p. 52.

Peerage of Ireland
Preceded by Patrick de Courcy	Baron Kingsale; 1669–1720	Succeeded by Gerald de Courcy
