= John de Courcy, 35th Baron Kingsale =

John de Courcy, 35th Baron Kingsale (27 January 1941 – 15 September 2005), was an Anglo-Irish nobleman who was the Premier Baron of Ireland.

== Early life and education ==
He succeeded his grandfather to the title in 1969. He was a posthumous child, his father, Lieutenant-Commander The Honourable Michael Robert Rancé de Courcy (1907–1940), RN, having been killed in action on 18 August 1940. His father's first wife, Glory Elizabeth Evans, was a daughter of Engr-Cdr Alfred Claremont Evans, R.N.,. His mother, Joan Reid, was born to a family who owned a lucrative lanolin oil business; this allowed for Lord Kingsale's education at Stowe School and the Universities of Paris and Salzburg, but the business later collapsed. He commented of his education – and public-school education in general – "it's no training for making a living", and observed "my education equipped me for an upper-class life of leisure, not working for a living. I wish I had been educated like my nephews who went to comprehensive school and have learnt about metalwork and carpentry. I've only learnt about such things in my early forties."

He took a sanguine attitude to his family's lack of money and "long downhill struggle", noting that his great-grandfather "went out to Assam in India and succeeded in being the only man there not to make money out of tea". Although his father inherited half a million pounds, according to his son he left debts of £30,000.

== Career ==
Lord Kingsale was a 2nd Lieutenant in the Irish Guards 1962–1965, after which he resigned due to being unable to keep himself on his limited private income. He was famous for his subsequent varied career, at various times working as a film extra (including on Cleopatra starring Elizabeth Taylor), a lorry driver in the West Midlands, safari keeper on the estate of the Duke of Bedford, and bingo caller in Birmingham. At one point he attempted publishing with his cousin, Kenneth de Courcy, and was a director of the off-licence chain Bin Ends. In the 1980s he ran a dating service in Australia — which was successful although he never managed himself to marry, although he made repeated attempts to acquire a wife. He was director of several companies, Chairman of the National Association for Service to the Realm (which advocated for the return of national service) from 1979, and Patron of L'Orchestre du Monde from 1988.

Lord Kingsale died in sheltered housing in Somerset, where he had lived since 1994, on 15 September 2005 aged 64. He was succeeded in his peerages by a descendant of the 20th Baron, Nevinson Mark de Courcy, who was born on 11 May 1958.

== Ancestry ==
Ancestors of John de Courcy, 35th Baron Kingsale

16. Michael de Courcy, 32nd Baron Kingsale
8. Michael de Courcy, 33rd Baron Kingsale
17. Esther Eleanor Williams
4. Michael de Courcy, 34th Baron Kingsale
18. William Sinclair de Courcy
9. Emily Frances Anne de Courcy
19.
2. The Hon. Michael de Courcy
20.
10. Tom Percy Woodhouse
21.
5. Constance Mary Rancé Woodhouse
22.
11.
23.
1. John de Courcy, 35th Baron Kingsale
24.
12.
25.
6. Robert Reid
26.
13.
27.
3. Joan Reid
28.
14.
29.
7.
30.
15.
31.

Peerage of Ireland
Preceded by Michael de Courcy	Baron Kingsale; 1969–2005	Succeeded by Nevinson de Courcy,
