= Kinsale (Parliament of Ireland constituency) =

Constituency in the Irish House of Commons to 1801

- Former borough constituency for the Irish House of Commons
- County: County Cork
- Borough: Kinsale

1334–1801
- Seats: 2
- Replaced by: Kinsale (UKHC)

Kinsale was a constituency represented in the Irish House of Commons until 1800.

== Members of Parliament, 1559–1801 ==
- 1559, Jan.
  - Sir John Alan, knight, former Lord Chancellor of Ireland, of Alencourt and St.Wolstan's, Kildare.
  - Francis Agar or Agard, Esq., of Grangegorman, Dublin, and of Fawston, Staffordshire.
- 1585, April.
  - James Galwey, Esq., of Kinsale.
  - Philip Roche, Esq., of Kinsale.
- 1613-1615
  - James Roche Fitz-Philip
  - Dominick Roche Fitz-Richard
- 1634-1635
  - William Gallwey
  - James Roche
- 1639-1641
  - Patrick Roche Fitz-Richard
  - Philip Roche Fitz-Richard
- 1661-1666
  - St. John Broderick
  - Randolph Clayton

=== 1689–1801 ===
Election	First MP	Second MP
1689	Andrew Murrogh	Miles de Courcy
1692	Edward Southwell	Jonas Stawell
1695	Edward Southwell	James Weller
1703	Henry Hawley	William Southwell
1713	Henry Hawley	Edward Southwell
September 1725	Anthony Stawell (Note: Declared not duly elected in 1725)	Edward Southwell
1725	Sir Richard Meade, 3rd Bt	Edward Southwell
October 1731	Sir Richard Meade, 3rd Bt	Gervais Parker (Note: Declared not duly elected in 1731)
November 1731	Sir Richard Meade, 3rd Bt	Richard Ponsonby
1745	Jonas Stawell	Richard Ponsonby
1761	John Folliott	Edward Southwell
1765	Agmondisham Vesey	Edward Southwell
1768	Agmondisham Vesey	James Kearney
1783	Cromwell Price	James Kearney
1790	William Rowley	James Kearney
1798	William Rowley	Samuel Campbell Rowley
1801	Succeeded by the Westminster constituency Kinsale	

== Bibliography ==
- O'Hart, John (2007). The Irish and Anglo-Irish Landed Gentry: When Cromwell came to Ireland. Vol. II. Heritage Books. ISBN 0-7884-1927-7.
- Johnston-Liik, E. M. (2002). History of the Irish Parliament, 1692–1800., Publisher: Ulster Historical Foundation (28 Feb 2002), ISBN 1-903688-09-4
- Tim Cadogan and Jeremiah Falvey, A Biographical Dictionary of Cork, 2006, Four Courts Press ISBN 1-84682-030-8
- Leigh Rayment's historical List of Members of the Irish House of Commons. Cites: Johnston-Liik, Edith Mary (2002). The History of the Irish Parliament 1692-1800 (6 volumes). Ulster Historical Foundation.
