= Baron Cromwell =

Title in the Peerage of England

Baron Cromwell is a title that has been created several times in the Peerage of England. The first creation, which was by writ, was for John de Cromwell in 1308. On his death, the barony became extinct. The second creation came in 1375 when Ralph de Cromwell was summoned by writ to Parliament as Lord Cromwell. His grandson, the third baron, served as Lord High Treasurer to King Henry VI. However, on his death in 1455, the barony fell into abeyance between his nieces Maude and Joan. On Joan's death in 1490, the abeyance was terminated in favour of Maude, the fourth holder. When she died childless in 1497 the peerage once again fell into abeyance, this time between the daughters of the first baron. The title remained in abeyance for over 400 years. However, in 1922 the Committee for Privileges of the House of Lords reported in favour of the petition for the termination of the abeyancy of Selina Frances Bewicke-Copley. She was the daughter of Sir Charles Watson Copley, 3rd Baronet, and one of the co-heirs of Maud, daughter of the first baron Cromwell. Selina died in 1923 and in July of the same year, the abeyance was terminated in favour of her son Robert Godfrey Wolesley Bewicke-Copley, who became the fifth baron. He notably served as Lord Lieutenant of Leicestershire. As of 2010 the ancient barony is held by his grandson, the seventh baron, who succeeded his father in 1982. Having lost his seat in the House of Lords under the House of Lords Act 1999, in April 2014 he was elected at a hereditary peers' by-election as a Crossbencher.

The third creation of the title came in 1461 when Sir Humphrey Bourchier was summoned by writ to Parliament as Lord Cromwell. On his death the barony became extinct. The fourth creation of the title came in 1536 for the famous statesman Thomas Cromwell, who served in many political offices, including Chancellor of the Exchequer, Lord Chancellor, and Lord Privy Seal. In contrast to the three previous creations, this peerage was created by letters patent. In 1540, Lord Cromwell was made Earl of Essex, but later that year he was executed for treason, and all of his titles were forfeit. The final creation of the title came in 1540 for Cromwell's son, Gregory, also by letters patent. His great-grandson, the fourth baron, was made Earl of Ardglass in 1645.

== Barons Cromwell, first creation (1308) ==
- John de Cromwell, 1st Baron Cromwell (d. c. 1335)

== Barons Cromwell, second creation (1375) ==
Arms of Cromwell of Tattershall: Argent, a chief gules overall a bend azure. Tattershall Castle, Lincolnshire was the seat of Ralph de Cromwell, 3rd Baron Cromwell (1403–1455)

- Ralph de Cromwell, 1st Baron Cromwell (d. 1398)
- Ralph de Cromwell, 2nd Baron Cromwell (1368–1417)
- Ralph Cromwell, 3rd Baron Cromwell (1403–1455) (abeyant 1455)
- Maud Stanhope, 4th Baroness Cromwell (d. 1497) (became sole heir 1490; abeyant 1497)
- Robert Bewicke-Copley, 5th Baron Cromwell (1893–1966) (abeyance terminated 1923)
- David Bewicke-Copley, 6th Baron Cromwell (1929–1982)
- Godfrey John Bewicke-Copley, 7th Baron Cromwell (b. 1960)

The heir apparent is the present holder's son the Hon. David Godfrey Bewicke-Copley (b. 1998)

== Barons Cromwell, third creation (1461) ==
- Humphrey Bourchier, 1st Baron Cromwell (d. 1471)

== Barons Cromwell, fourth creation (1536) ==
Arms of Thomas Cromwell, 1st Baron Cromwell

Baron Cromwell, of Wimbledon in the County of Surrey:

- Thomas Cromwell, 1st Earl of Essex (forfeit 1540)

== Barons Cromwell, fifth creation (1540) ==
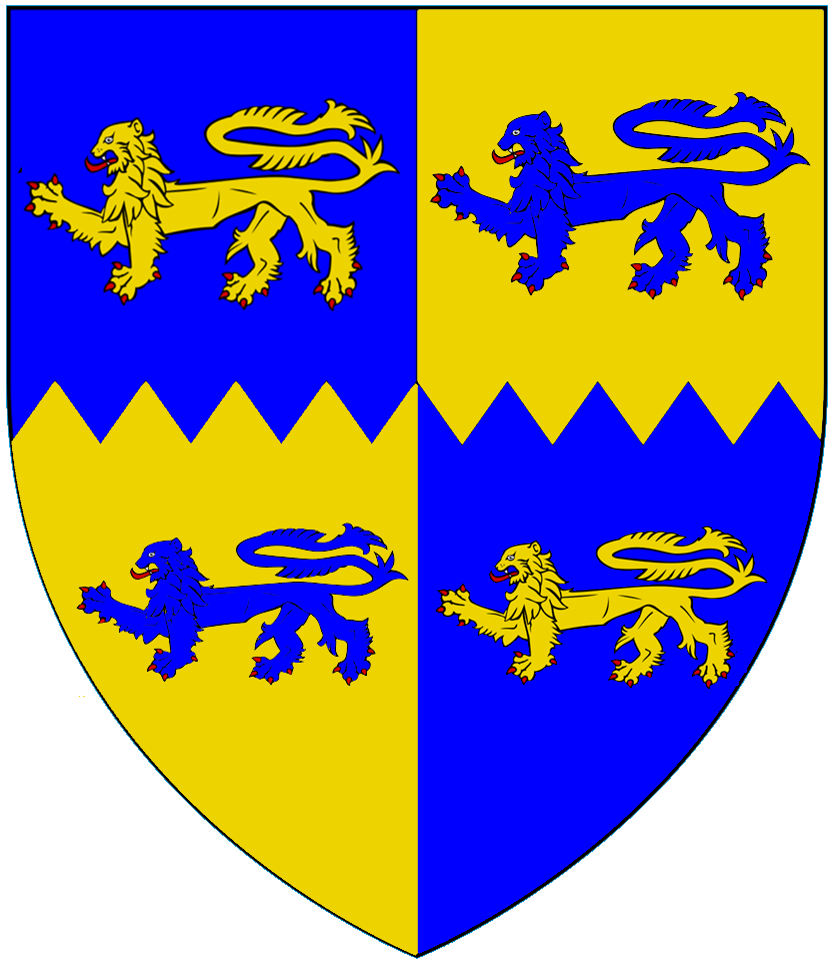
Arms of Gregory Cromwell, 1st Baron Cromwell: Quarterly, per fess, indented, azure and or, four lions passant counterchanged.

Baron Cromwell:

- Gregory Cromwell, 1st Baron Cromwell (c. 1520–1551)
- Henry Cromwell, 2nd Baron Cromwell (1538–1592)
- Edward Cromwell, 3rd Baron Cromwell (c. 1560–1607)
- Thomas Cromwell, 4th Baron Cromwell (1594–1653) (created 1st Viscount Lecale in 1624 and 1st Earl of Ardglass in 1645)
- Wingfield Cromwell, 5th Baron Cromwell (1624–1668)
- Thomas Cromwell, 6th Baron Cromwell (1653–1682)
- Vere Essex Cromwell, 7th Baron Cromwell (1625–1687)
