= Baron Kingsale =

Title in the Irish peerage

Barony Kingsale
- Argent, three eagles displayed gules ducally crowned or.
- Creation date: 1223
- Created by: Henry III of England
- Peerage: Peerage of Ireland
- Motto: Vincit omnia veritas

Baron Kingsale is a title of the premier baron in the Peerage of Ireland. The feudal barony dates to at least the thirteenth century. The first peerage creation was by writ.

== Name and precedence ==
In the early times the name was "Kinsale" or "Kinsale and Ringrone", but the spelling Kingsale has imposed itself with time and Ringrone was dropped. Regarding its precedence among the Irish baronies, the title Baron Athenry was considered the eldest and Kingsale held the second rank. However, in 1799 Athenry became dormant (and probably extinct) and Kingsale was elevated to premier Baron in Ireland.

Family tree

Barons of Kinsale, Ringrone, or Kingsale. (Note: This family tree is based on a tree of the later barons Kingsale and on genealogies of the de Courcy family)

Nicholas de Courcy; 12th Baron d. 1476	Mary; O'Mahon
James de Courcy; 13th Baron d. 1499	Hellena; Roche	David de Courcy; 15th Baron d. 1520	Jane; Roche
Edmond de Courcy; 14th Baron d. 1505	John de Courcy; 16th Baron d. 1535	Edmund de Courcy
Gerald de Courcy; 17th Baron d. 1599	Edmund; Oge de Courcy	Juliana; O'Hurley
John de Courcy; 18th Baron d. 1628	Mary; O'Crowly
Gerald de Courcy; 19th Baron d. c. 1642	Patrick de Courcy; 20st Baron d. 1663	Mary; FitzGerald	David de Courcy
John de Courcy; 21st Baron d. 1667	Ellen; MacCarthy; Reagh	Miles de Courcy	Elizabeth; Sadleir	Anthony de Courcy d. 1727
Patrick de Courcy; 22nd Baron; Kingsale; 1660–1669	Almeric de Courcy; 23rd Baron; Kingsale; 1664–1720	Anne; Dring d. 1724	Gerald de Courcy; 24th Baron; 1700–1759	Miles de Courcy
John de Courcy; 25th Baron; 1717–1776	Martha; Heron
John de Courcy; 26th Baron d. 1822	Susan; Blenner- hassett d. 1819	Michael de Courcy d. 1824; Vice-Admiral	Anne; Blenner- hassett d. 1828
Thomas de Courcy; 27th Baron d. 1832	Michael de Courcy d. 1813	Gerald de Courcy d. 1848	Rev. Michael de Courcy d. 1860
John; Stapleton de Courcy; 28th Baron d. 1847	John; Fitzroy de Courcy; 31st Baron d. 1890	Michael; William de Courcy; 32nd Baron d. 1895
John; Constantine de Courcy; 29th Baron d. 1865	Michael; Conrad de Courcy; 30th Baron d. 1874	Michael; Constantine de Courcy; 33th Baron d. 1931
Michael; William Robert de Courcy; 34th Baron d. 1969
Michael; John Rancé de Courcy d. 1940 d.v.p.*
Michael; Charles C. de Courcy d. 1969 d.v.p.*	John de Courcy; 35th Baron d. 2005

Legend

XXX	Barons; Kingsale

*d.v.p. = predeceased his father (decessit vita patris)

== Numbering ==
The literature usually numbers the successive barons to avoid confusion arising from the repetitions of the same names, such as Miles or John de Courcy in the long line of the barons of Kingsale. Two such schemes are in common use, often both are cited together, e.g. Almeric de Courcy 18th (or 23rd) Baron. The older scheme numbers all the barons starting with Miles de Courcy, who was granted the baronies of Kingsale and Ringrone by Henry III in 1223. This scheme dates from Lodge in 1754. An alternative numbering was introduced by Cokayne in 1929 with the second version of The Complete Peerage. It excludes the early barons, that it considers feudal, and starts with Miles, who died in 1344, accepted as the first peer. This article follows the older numbering, considered more common.

== Hat trick ==
The barons traditionally claimed the privilege of remaining covered (that is, wearing a hat) in the presence of the monarch. It was supposed to have been obtained from King John by John de Courcy and handed down to his heirs. As far as is known, the right has been exercised for the first time by Almeric de Courcy, 23rd Baron Kingsale before William III in 1692. His successor Gerald de Courcy, 24th Baron Kingsale repeated the hat trick before George I in 1720 and George II on 22 June 1727. The Eleventh Edition of the Encyclopædia Britannica, however, states that the privilege "is a legend without historic foundation".

== Castles ==
- Kilbrittain Castle once belonged to the De Courcys but was lost to Donal Gott MacCarthy, King of Desmond, whose son Donal Maol MacCarthy Reagh was the first King of Carbery and founder of the MacCarthy Reagh dynasty.
- Coolmain Castle
- Old Head Castle

== Decline ==
Despite the antiquity of the title, the family no longer retains its property or wealth, having supported the losing side in past conflicts. The 30th (or 35th) Baron, despite education at Stowe and the Universities of Paris and Salzburg, supported by his father's marriage to the daughter of a Yorkshire lanolin oil business owner, was, due to the later failure of that business amongst other things, an odd-job man and plumber, and died a resident of sheltered housing.

The person currently entitled to hold the title is Nevinson Mark de Courcy, who was born in 1958 and lives in Remuera, Auckland, New Zealand. He is or would be the 31st (or 36th) Baron, however, his name does not appear in the current Roll of the Peerage. Under the terms of the Royal Warrant of 2004, any person who succeeds to a Peerage must prove his or her succession and be placed on the Roll, otherwise, that person may not be recognised as a peer legally or in official documents in the United Kingdom.

== Lists ==
=== Feudal Barons (before 1222) - incomplete ===
- Miles de courcy (summoned 1223)
- Patrick de Courcy (died before 1261)
- Miles de Courcy (died c. 1290)
- John de Courcy (died 1291)

=== Barons Kingsale (c. 1340) ===
- Miles de Courcy, 6th Baron Kingsale (died 1344)
- Miles de Courcy, 7th Baron Kingsale (died c. 1372)
- John de Courcy, 8th Baron Kingsale (died c. 1390)
- William de Courcy, 9th Baron Kingsale (died c. 1400)
- Nicholas de Courcy, 10th Baron Kingsale (died c. 1410)
- Patrick de Courcy, 11th Baron Kingsale (died c. 1449)
- Nicholas de Courcy, 12th Baron Kingsale (died 1475)
- James de Courcy, 13th Baron Kingsale (died 1499)
- Edmund de Courcy, 14th Baron Kingsale (died c. 1505)
- David de Courcy, 15th Baron Kingsale (died c. 1520)
- John de Courcy, 16th Baron Kingsale (died 1535)
- Gerald de Courcy, 17th Baron Kingsale (died 1599)
- John de Courcy, 18th Baron Kingsale (died 1628)
- Gerald de Courcy, 19th Baron Kingsale (died c. 1642)
- Patrick de Courcy, 20th Baron Kingsale (died 1663?)
- John de Courcy, 21st Baron Kingsale (died 1667)
- Patrick de Courcy, 22nd Baron Kingsale (1659/60–1669)
- Almeric de Courcy, 23rd Baron Kingsale (1665–1720)
- Gerald de Courcy, 24th Baron Kingsale (1700–1759)
- John de Courcy, 25th Baron Kingsale (c. 1717–1776)
- John de Courcy, 26th Baron Kingsale (died 1822)
- Thomas de Courcy, 27th Baron Kingsale (1774–1832)
- John Stapleton de Courcy, 28th Baron Kingsale (1805–1847)
- John Constantine de Courcy, 29th Baron Kingsale (1827–1865)
- Michael Conrad de Courcy, 30th Baron Kingsale (1828–1874)
- John Fitzroy de Courcy, 31st Baron Kingsale (1821–1890)
- Michael William de Courcy, 32nd Baron Kingsale (1822–1895)
- Michael Constantine de Courcy, 33rd Baron Kingsale (1855–1931)
- Michael William Robert de Courcy, 34th Baron Kingsale (1882–1969)
- John de Courcy, 35th Baron Kingsale (1941–2005)
- Nevinson Mark de Courcy, 36th Baron Kingsale (born 1958, living in New Zealand)

The heir presumptive is Joseph Kenneth Charles de Courcy (1955), eldest son of Kenneth de Courcy

== Notes and references ==
=== Sources ===
==== Books ====
- Burke, Bernard; Burke, Ashworth Peter (1909). A Genealogical and Heraldic History of the Peerage and Baronetage, the Privy Council, Knightage and Companionage (71st ed.). London: Harrison. OCLC 28297274.
- Burtchaell, George Dames; Sadleir, Thomas (1935) [1st pub. 1924]. Alumni Dublinenses: A Register of the Students, Graduates, Professors and Provosts of Trinity College in the University of Dublin (1593–1860). Dublin: A. Thom & Co. OCLC 1160688115.
- Chisholm, Hugh (1911). "Courci, John de" . In Chisholm, Hugh (ed.). Encyclopædia Britannica. Vol. 7 (11th ed.). Cambridge University Press. p. 319.
- Cokayne, George Edward (1892). Complete Peerage of England, Scotland, Ireland, Great Britain and the United Kingdom, Extant, Extinct, or Dormant. Vol. IV (1st ed.). London: George Bell and Sons. OCLC 1180828941. – G to K (for Kingsale)
- Cokayne, George Edward (1929). Doubleday, H. A. (ed.). The complete peerage of England, Scotland, Ireland, Great Britain and the United Kingdom, extant, extinct, or dormant. Vol. VII (2nd ed.). London: St Catherine Press. – Hussey to Lincolnshire (Snippet view, for Kingsale)
- Lodge, John (1754). The Peerage of Ireland or, A Genealogical History of the Present Nobility of that Kingdom. Vol. IV. London: William Johnston. OCLC 220656509. – Barons (Preview)
- Lodge, John (1789). Archdall, Mervyn (ed.). The Peerage of Ireland or, A Genealogical History of the Present Nobility of that Kingdom. Vol. VI. Dublin: James Moore. OCLC 264906028. – Viscounts, barons
- McCarthy, Samuel Trant (1922). The MacCarthys of Munster. Dundalk: The Dundalgan Press. OCLC 1157128759. – (for Kilbrittain Castle)
- O'Hart, John (1892). Irish Pedigrees: Or, the Origin and Stem of the Irish Nation. Vol. II (5th ed.). Dublin: James Duffy & Co. OCLC 7239210. – Normans, English, Huguenots etc.
- Wills, Rev. James (1840). "John de Courcy". Lives of Illustrious and Distinguished Irishmen, from the earliest times to the present period. Vol. I. Dublin: MacGregor, Polson & Co. pp. 308–321.
- Wills, Rev. James (1841). "Almericus de Courcy, Baron Kingsale". Lives of Illustrious and Distinguished Irishmen, from the earliest times to the present period. Vol. IV. Dublin: MacGregor, Polson & Co. p. 52.

==== News ====
- "Kinsale History: Ireland's premier Baron 'Lord Kingsale' lives in New Zealand. His surname is 'de Courcy'". 13 July 2020.
- "How to live like a lord on pounds 68 a week". The Independent. 22 October 2011.
