= Vere Essex Cromwell, 4th Earl of Ardglass =

English nobleman

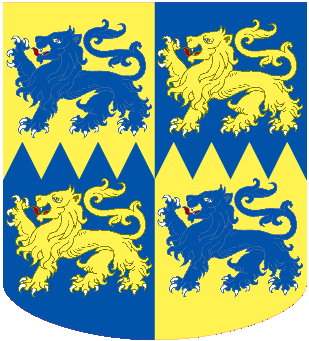
- Arms of Cromwell, Earl of Ardglass: Quarterly, per fess, indented, azure and or, four lions passant
- Tenure: 1682–1687
- Successor: All titles extinct
- Other titles: 4th Viscount Lecale; 7th Baron Cromwell
- Known for: English nobleman
- Born: Vere Essex Cromwell; 2 October 1625; Ilam, Staffordshire, England
- Died: 26 November 1687 (aged 62); Booncastle, County Down, Kingdom of Ireland
- Buried: Down Cathedral, Downpatrick; 54.327061°N 5.722547°W
- Spouse: Catherine Hamilton (m. 1672)
- Issue: Elizabeth
- Parents: Thomas Cromwell, 1st Earl of Ardglass; Elizabeth Meverell

Vere Essex Cromwell, 4th Earl of Ardglass PC (I), (2 October 1625 – 26 November 1687) was an English nobleman, son of Thomas Cromwell, 1st Earl of Ardglass and Elizabeth Meverell. He was the last direct male descendant of Henry VIII's chief minister, and key architect of the English reformation, Thomas Cromwell.

== Life ==
Vere Essex Cromwell was born at Throwleigh, Staffordshire and was educated at Trinity College, Dublin. He succeeded his nephew Thomas Cromwell as Earl of Ardglass and Viscount Lecale in the Peerage of Ireland in 1682, as well as Baron Cromwell in the Peerage of England. He died 26 November 1687 at his home in Booncastle, County Down and was buried 29 November at Downpatrick Abbey, County Down. On his death without male issue, all of his titles became extinct.

== Marriage and issue ==
In 1672 he married Catherine Hamilton, widow of Richard Price, of Greencastle, Kilkeel, County Down. She was the daughter of James Hamilton, of Newcastle Kilcoo, County Down and Margaret Kynaston, of Saul, County Down. By her, he had an only daughter:

- Elizabeth Cromwell (c. 3 December 1674 – 31 March 1709) married Edward Southwell, (c. 1667 – 4 Dec 1730) and had a son, Edward (1 Jun 1705 – 16 Mar 1755)

== Bibliography ==
- "Ardglass, Earl of (I, 1645 - 1687). Cracroft's Peerage". Cracroftspeerage.co.uk.
- Burke, Bernard (1866). A Genealogical History of the dormant, abeyant, forfeited and extinct peerages of the British Empire. London: Harrison.
- "Catharine Hamilton, Family Search: Community Trees. British Isles. Peerage, Baronetage, and Landed Gentry Families with Extended Lineage". Histfam.familysearch.org. Archived from the original on 4 March 2016.
- Cokayne, G. E. (1910). Gibbs, Vicary (ed.). The Complete Peerage of England, Scotland, Ireland, Great Britain and the United Kingdom, Extant, Extinct or Dormant. Vol. I. London: St. Catherine Press.
- Cokayne, G. E. (1913). Gibbs, Vicary (ed.). The Complete Peerage of England, Scotland, Ireland, Great Britain and the United Kingdom. Vol. III. London: St. Catherine Press.
- Cokayne, G. E. (2000). Gibbs, Vicary; et al. (eds.). The Complete Peerage of England, Scotland, Ireland, Great Britain and the United Kingdom, vol. I (New ed.). Gloucester: Alan Sutton Publishing.
- "Cromwell, Baron (E, 1540 - 1687).Cracroft's Peerage". Cracroftspeerage.co.uk.
- Hammond, Peter W., ed. (1998). The Complete Peerage or a History of the House of Lords and All its Members From the Earliest Times. Vol. XIV: Addenda & Corrigenda. Stroud, Gloucestershire: Sutton Publishing. p. 33.
- "Vere Essex Cromwell, Earl of Ardglass, Family Search: Community Trees. British Isles. Peerage, Baronetage, and Landed Gentry Families with Extended Lineage". Histfam.familysearch.org. Archived from the original on 29 October 2013.

Military offices
Preceded by Earl of Ossory	Colonel of the 2nd Irish Regiment of Horse; 1686–1687	Succeeded by The Viscount Galmoye
Peerage of Ireland
Preceded by Thomas Cromwell	Earl of Ardglass; 1682–1687	Extinct
