= Andrew Murrogh =

Andrew FitzJames Morrough

Member of Parliament for Kinsale
- In office 1689–1689 Serving with Miles de Courcy
- Preceded by: St. John Broderick; Randolph Clayton
- Succeeded by: Edward Southwell Sr. Jonas Stawell

Personal details
- Born: c. 1650
- Died: c. 1692
- Party: Jacobite
- Education: Gray's Inn
- Occupation: Recorder of Kinsale; Tax assessor for County Cork
- Profession: Lawyer; Politician

Andrew FitzJames Morrough (fl. c.1650 – c.1692) was an Irish Jacobite politician.

Morrough was the son of James Morrough. In 1668 he was admitted to Gray's Inn and was later called to the Irish bar. Under a new charter granted to Kinsale by James II, from 28 February 1687 he held the office of Recorder of Kinsale. A supporter of James II, in 1689 he was elected to the short-lived Patriot Parliament as a Member of Parliament for Kinsale alongside Miles de Courcy. He also served as a tax assessor for County Cork. Following the conclusion of the Williamite War in Ireland, Morrough lost land amounting to a value of £80 per year in the Williamite land confiscations.

Parliament of Ireland
Preceded by St. John Broderick; Randolph Clayton	Member of Parliament for Kinsale; 1689; With: Miles de Courcy	Succeeded by Edward Southwell Sr. Jonas Stawell
