= Edward Southwell Jr. =

Anglo-Irish Whig politician (1705-1755)

Edward Southwell
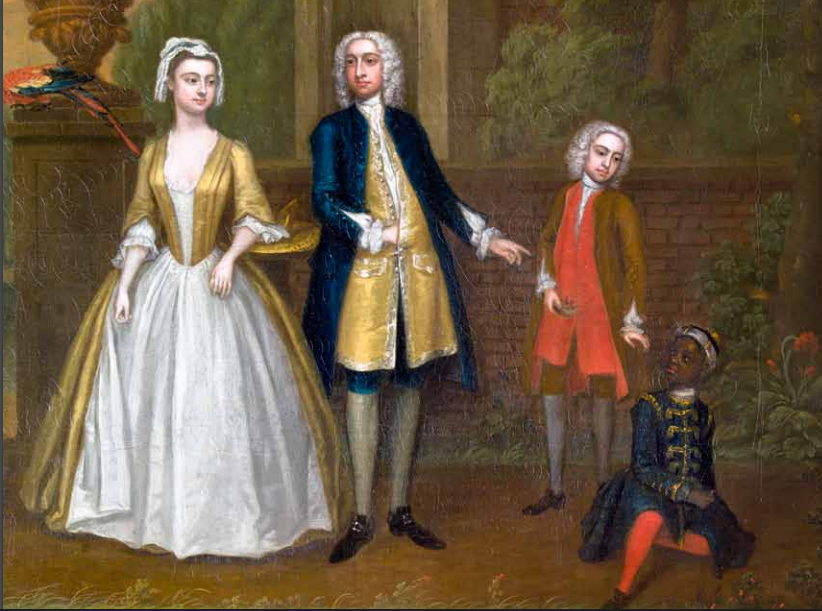
- Edward Southwell Jr.

Member of Parliament for Downpatrick
- In office 1727–1755 Serving with Cromwell Price
- Preceded by: Sir Emanuel Moore, 3rd Bt; Thomas Medlycott
- Succeeded by: Cromwell Price; Bowen Southwell

Member of Parliament for Bristol
- In office 1739–1754 Serving with Sir Abraham Elton, Bt (1739-42); Robert Hoblyn (1742–54)
- Preceded by: Thomas Coster; Sir Abraham Elton, Bt
- Succeeded by: Richard Beckford; Robert Nugent

Secretary of State (Ireland)
- In office 1730–1746
- Preceded by: Edward Southwell
- Succeeded by: Edward Weston

Personal details
- Born: 16 June 1705 King's Weston, Gloucestershire, England
- Died: 16 March 1755 (aged 49)
- Party: Whig
- Spouse: Lady Katherine Watson (m. 1729)
- Parents: Edward Southwell (father); Elizabeth Cromwell (mother)
- Relatives: Edward Southwell (son)
- Education: Westminster School
- Alma mater: Queen's College, Oxford

Edward Southwell Jr. (16 June 1705 – 16 March 1755) of King's Weston, Gloucestershire, was an Anglo-Irish Whig politician who sat in the Parliament of Ireland from 1727 to 1755 and in the British House of Commons from 1739 to 1754.

Southwell was the son of Edward Southwell (1671–1730) and Elizabeth Cromwell, 8th Baroness Cromwell and the grandson of Sir Robert Southwell. He was educated at Westminster School from 1715 to 1716 and matriculated at Queen's College, Oxford in 1721. He travelled abroad from 1723.

Southwell sat in the Irish House of Commons for Downpatrick from 1727 until his death. He succeeded his father as Principal Secretary of State (Ireland) in 1730, and on 6 May 1732 he was appointed to the Privy Council of Ireland.

Southwell married on 21 August 1729, to Lady Katherine Watson (died April 1765), daughter of Edward Watson, Viscount Sondes and Lady Katherine (née Tufton), and lived in Kings Weston House near Bristol. Their son, Edward, later became Baron de Clifford.

Edward Southwell Jr. sat in the House of Commons of Great Britain from 1739 to 1754 as MP for Bristol.

== Personal papers ==
Papers relating to Edward Southwell are held by Bristol Archives (Ref. 44785 and 45317/2/5/1) (online catalogue page 1, online catalogue page 2). A travel journal, dating from 1725 to 1726, is held in the British Library Manuscripts Collections. Other records relating to Edward Southwell are held at Bristol Reference Library.

Parliament of Ireland
Preceded by Sir Emanuel Moore, 3rd Bt; Thomas Medlycott	Member of Parliament for Downpatrick; 1727–1755; With: Cromwell Price	Succeeded by Cromwell Price; Bowen Southwell
Parliament of Great Britain
Preceded by Thomas Coster; Sir Abraham Elton, Bt	Member of Parliament for Bristol; 1739–1754; With: Sir Abraham Elton, Bt to 1742; Robert Hoblyn 1742–54	Succeeded by Richard Beckford; Robert Nugent
Political offices
Preceded by Edward Southwell	Secretary of State (Ireland); 1730–1746	Succeeded by Edward Weston
