= Thomas Fagg =

English Member of Parliament

Member of Parliament for Rye
- In office December 1701 – 1705

Personal details
- Born: 1665
- Died: 1705 (aged 39–40)

Thomas Fagg (1665–1705) of Rye and Glynley, Westham, Sussex, was an English Member of Parliament.

He was a Member (MP) of the Parliament of England for Rye December 1701 to 1705.
