= Kenneth de Courcy =

Editor of newsletter in the UK

Kenneth Hugh de Courcy (6 November 1909 – 8 February 1999) was an editor of the British subscription newsletter Intelligence Digest, as well as a confidant of British King Edward VIII. In the 1940s, de Courcy was part of a plot by conservative members of the British royal court to return the Duke and Duchess of Windsor to Britain and establish a regency. He liked to be known as the Duc de Grantmesnil.

== Life and career ==
Kenneth de Courcy was born in Galway, Ireland in 1909. He became wealthy as a businessman, owning a chain of tobacco shops and other businesses.

In 1934, de Courcy became secretary of the Imperial Policy Group, a grouping of right-wing Conservative MPs, which focused on "the importance of Imperial development" and "close friendship with the United States". Later the group supported appeasement of Nazi Germany as the best means of preserving the British Empire, and in that capacity de Courcy travelled Europe making high-level contacts.

In 1934, he founded Courcy's Intelligence Service to provide early warning intelligence to businesses and the government. Four years later he began Intelligence Digest (now Courcy’s Intelligence Brief), together with The Weekly Review. He was joined in the business by a cousin, John de Courcy, 35th Baron Kingsale.

De Courcy was accused in the War Cabinet minutes of 13 April 1942 of being "up to mischief" by "writing poisonous publications about the Russians". At several points in his life de Courcy believed the British Security Service (MI5) was intercepting his mail and telephone communications, and he was indeed the subject of MI5 surveillance; The diary of General Alan Brooke, Chief of the Imperial General Staff through much of World War II, records that MI5 brought him report (30 September 1942) of a conversation overheard through a hidden microphone indicating that De Courcy possessed secret information about the impending invasion of French North Africa.

In 1952 on the death of George VI he wrote to Winston Churchill suggesting Elizabeth II develop a closer relationship with the abdicated King Edward, now living abroad.

In 1950, de Courcy married Rosemary Catherine Baker, who was also from Ireland. They had four children. The marriage was dissolved in 1973.

Between 1953 and 1964 he was a member of the committee of the Evangelical Alliance which organised Billy Graham's 'crusades' in Great Britain.

In the 1960s, via a company called Sarsden Consolidated Properties, de Courcy planned a garden city development in Southern Rhodesia (now Zimbabwe). He was unable to return the funds put up by investors and was jailed for seven years for fraud. De Courcy escaped from custody when he was allowed to visit his lawyer as part of his appeal, although he was recaptured.

De Courcy went on to edit publications such as Banker's Digest and Special Office Brief.

In 2001 an appeal against De Courcy's conviction in 1964 was considered by the Criminal Cases Review Commission. The Commission found there could be doubt on the safety of the conviction on three counts and in February 2001 it referred the case to the Court of Appeal. However, this upheld the convictions in July 2005. It was reported in 2014 that the conviction had been classed as a miscarriage of justice.
