= Philip Herbert (died 1716) =

English Member of Parliament

Member of Parliament for Rye
- In office 1705 – 18 November 1707

Personal details
- Born: c. 1665 Westminster
- Died: 1716
- Occupation: Politician

Philip Herbert (c. 1665 – 1716), of Westminster, was an English Member of Parliament. He was a Member (MP) of the Parliament of England for Rye 1705 to 18 November 1707.
