= Wingfield Cromwell, 2nd Earl of Ardglass =

English nobleman (1624-1668)

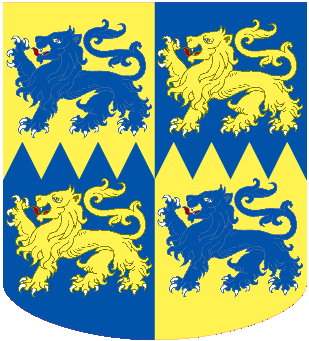
- Arms of Cromwell, Earl of Ardglass: Quarterly, per fess, indented, azure and or, four lions passant
- Tenure: 1653–1668
- Successor: Thomas Cromwell, 3rd Earl of Ardglass
- Other titles: 2nd Viscount Lecale; 5th Baron Cromwell
- Known for: English nobleman
- Born: Wingfield Cromwell; 12 September 1624; Throwleigh, Staffordshire, England
- Died: 3 October 1668 (aged 44)
- Buried: Ilam, Staffordshire, England
- Spouse: Mary Russell
- Issue: Thomas Cromwell, 3rd Earl of Ardglass
- Parents: Thomas Cromwell, 1st Earl of Ardglass; Elizabeth Meverell

Wingfield Cromwell, 2nd Earl of Ardglass, DCL, (12 September 1624 – 3 October 1668) was an English nobleman, son of Thomas Cromwell, 1st Earl of Ardglass and Elizabeth Meverell. He held the subsidiary titles of 2nd Viscount Lecale and 5th Baron Cromwell of Oakham.

== Life ==
Wingfield Cromwell was born at Throwleigh, Staffordshire and educated at Stone School, Staffordshire. He matriculated at Trinity College Dublin, on 20 March 1637/1638, and later awarded with the honorary degree of Doctor of Civil Law (DCL) by the University of Oxford, Oxford, Oxfordshire, in 1642.

In April 1649, during the English Civil War, he fought for King Charles I of England and was taken prisoner in the Royalist cause when fighting against Parliamentarians at Chester.

He succeeded to the titles of 5th Baron Cromwell of Oakham, in the Peerage of England (1540), 2nd Viscount Lecale, in Ulster, in the Peerage of Ireland (1624) and 2nd Earl of Ardglass, in the Peerage of Ireland (1645) in 1653.

He died on 3 October 1668 and was buried at Ilam, Staffordshire.

== Marriage and issue ==
He married Mary Russell (bef. 1634 – aft. 12 September 1687), daughter of Sir William Russell, 1st Baronet, of Strensham, Worcestershire, and Frances Reade, daughter of Sir Thomas Reade, and had an only son:

- Thomas Cromwell, 3rd Earl of Ardglass (29 November 1653 – 11 April 1682)

His widow married secondly as his second wife in 1670 or between 1670 and 1675 Charles Cotton of Beresford Hall, Nottinghamshire, the angler and poet, and died in 1675 or after 12 September 1687.

== Bibliography ==
- "Ardglass, Earl of (I, 1645 – 1687). Cracroft's Peerage". Cracroftspeerage.co.uk.
- Burke, Bernard (1866). A Genealogical History of the dormant, abeyant, forfeited and extinct peerages of the British Empire. London: Harrison.
- Cokayne, G. E. (1910). Gibbs, Vicary (ed.). The Complete Peerage of England, Scotland, Ireland, Great Britain and the United Kingdom, Extant, Extinct or Dormant. Vol. I. London: St. Catherine Press.
- Cokayne, G. E. (1913). Gibbs, Vicary (ed.). The Complete Peerage of England, Scotland, Ireland, Great Britain and the United Kingdom. Vol. III. London: St. Catherine Press.
- Cokayne, G. E. (2000). Gibbs, Vicary; et al. (eds.). The Complete Peerage of England, Scotland, Ireland, Great Britain and the United Kingdom, Extant, Extinct or Dormant. Vol. I (new ed.). Gloucester: Alan Sutton Publishing.
- "Cromwell, Baron (E, 1540 – 1687). Cracroft's Peerage". Cracroftspeerage.co.uk.
- "Wingfield Cromwell, Earl of Ardglass, Family Search: Community Trees. British Isles. Peerage, Baronetage, and Landed Gentry Families with Extended Lineage". Histfam.familysearch.org.

Peerage of Ireland
Preceded by Thomas Cromwell	Earl of Ardglass; 1653–1668	Succeeded by Thomas Cromwell
