= Richard Beckford =

British politician (died 1796)

Richard Beckford (died 12 August 1796) was a British Whig politician.

== Biography ==
Beckford was one of the first mixed-race Members of Parliament of the Parliament of Great Britain and served for the constituencies of Bridport, Arundel and Leominster from 1780 until his death in 1796.

He previously, unsuccessfully, attempted to be elected to Hindon in both 1774, against Thomas Brand Hollis and Richard Smith, and the 1775 by-election when both Smith and Hollis were removed from office for bribery, but was unsuccessful.

Beckford's father, William Beckford, was an MP and plantation owner, whilst his mother was a Jamaican slave.

== See also ==
- List of ethnic minority politicians in the United Kingdom
