= Thomas Cromwell, 1st Earl of Ardglass =

English nobleman (1594–1653)

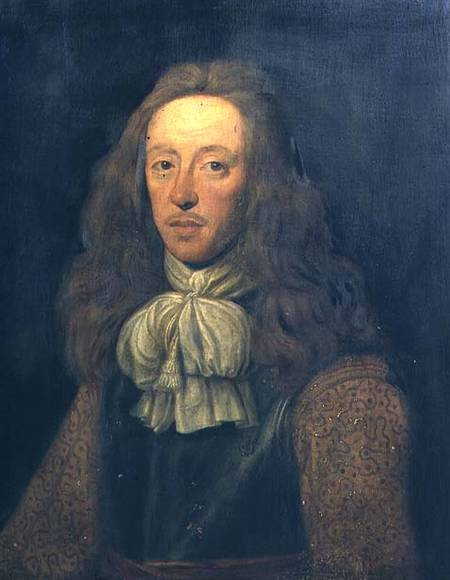
- Thomas Cromwell Earl of Ardglass (1594–1653)
- Tenure: 1645–1653
- Successor: Wingfield Cromwell, 2nd Earl of Ardglass
- Other titles: 1st Viscount Lecale; 4th Baron Cromwell
- Known for: English nobleman
- Born: Thomas Cromwell; 11 June 1594
- Died: 20 November 1653 (aged 59); Tickencote, Rutland, England
- Buried: St Peter's Church, Tickencote
- Wars and battles: Wars of the Three Kingdoms
- Spouse: Elizabeth Meverell
- Issue: Wingfield Cromwell, 2nd Earl of Ardglass (1624–1668); Vere Essex Cromwell, 4th Earl of Ardglass (1625–1687); Mary Cromwell (died 1676)
- Parents: Edward Cromwell, 3rd Baron Cromwell; Frances Rugge

Thomas Cromwell, 1st Earl of Ardglass, 11 June 1594 to 20 November 1653, was an English nobleman, son of Edward Cromwell, 3rd Baron Cromwell and his second wife Frances Rugge.

== Personal details ==
Thomas Cromwell was born on 11 June 1594, the eldest son of Edward Cromwell, 3rd Baron Cromwell (1560–1607) and his second wife Frances Rugge (1563–1631). He had two sisters, Frances (1595–1662) and Anne (1597–1639), as well as a half-sister from his father's first marriage, Elizabeth (born before 1593).

== Career ==
Thomas Cromwell's father Edward escaped punishment for his role in Essex's Rebellion of 1601 but debt forced him to exchange his estates in England for lands in Ulster which had been confiscated after the end of Tyrone's Rebellion and relocate his family to the Kingdom of Ireland. Thomas succeeded as 4th Baron Cromwell in the Peerage of England after his father died in Downpatrick on 24 September 1607 and was further created 1st Viscount Lecale in the Peerage of Ireland, on 22 November 1624.

A supporter of Charles I of England during the Wars of the Three Kingdoms, he was Colonel of Lord Cromwell's Troop of Horse, raised as part of the Royal Irish Army in 1640. In return for his service, he was created 1st Earl of Ardglass, in the Peerage of Ireland, on 15 April 1645; he was subsequently fined £460 by the Committee for Compounding with Delinquents set up by Parliament. This allegiance placed him in an opposing camp to his distant cousin Oliver Cromwell.

== Marriage and issue ==
He married Elizabeth Meverell (died 1651), daughter and heiress of Robert Meverell of Ilam, Staffordshire, and of Throwley Old Hall, Staffordshire (died 5 February 1627/1628) and Elizabeth Fleming, both buried at Blore, Staffordshire, the daughter of Sir Thomas Fleming, Lord Chief Justice of the King's Bench, and had three children:

- Wingfield Cromwell, 2nd Earl of Ardglass (12 September 1624 – 3 October 1668)
- Vere Essex Cromwell, 4th Earl of Ardglass (2 October 1625 – 26 November 1687)
- Mary Cromwell (died 8 April 1676), married as his first wife William FitzHerbert, of Tissington, Derbyshire (1624/1629 – 24 June 1697), who married secondly Anne Breton, widow of John Parker, of London, and daughter of Richard Breton, of Elmesthorpe, Leicestershire, without any male issue.

He and his wife both died in 1653 and were buried at St Peter's Church, Tickencote, Rutland, and his last will, dated 26 March 1653, was probated in 1661.

== Arms ==
Coat of arms of Thomas Cromwell, 1st Earl of Ardglass
Crest On a Chapeau Gules turned up Ermine a Pelican Or guttée Azure vulning herself proper Escutcheon Quarterly per fess indented Or and Azure four Lions passant counterchanged Supporters On either side a Bull Gules winged Argent crined and hoofed Or Motto Semi mortuus qui timet

== Bibliography ==
- Burke, Bernard (1967). Townsend, Peter (ed.). Burke's Genealogical and Heraldic History of the Peerage, Baronetage and Knightage (104th ed.). London: Burke's Peerage Ltd.
- Burke, Bernard (2003). Mosley, Charles (ed.). Burke's Peerage, Baronetage & Knightage. Vol. 1 (107th ed.). Wilmington: Burke's Peerage (Genealogical Books) Ltd. p. 1438. ISBN 0971196621.
- Burke, Bernard (1866). A Genealogical History of the Dormant, Abeyant, Forfeited and Extinct Peerages of the British Empire. London: Harrison.
- Burke, John; Burke, John Bernard (1844). A Genealogical and Heraldic History of the Extinct and Dormant Baronetcies of England, Ireland, and Scotland (2nd ed.). John Russell Smith.
- Cokayne, G. E. (1983). Complete Baronetage. Vol. I. Gloucester: Alan Sutton Publishing.
- Cokayne, G. E. (1910). Gibbs, Vicary (ed.). The Complete Peerage of England, Scotland, Ireland, Great Britain and the United Kingdom, Extant, Extinct or Dormant. Vol. I. London: St. Catherine Press.
- Cokayne, G. E. (1913). Gibbs, Vicary (ed.). The Complete Peerage of England, Scotland, Ireland, Great Britain and the United Kingdom. Vol. III. London: St. Catherine Press.
- Cokayne, G. E. (2000). Gibbs, Vicary (ed.). The Complete Peerage of England, Scotland, Ireland, Great Britain and the United Kingdom. Vol. I. Gloucester: Alan Sutton Publishing. pp. 192–193.
- Lee, Sidney (1888). "Cromwell, Edward" . In Stephen, Leslie (ed.). Dictionary of National Biography. Vol. 13. London: Smith, Elder & Co. p. 151.

Peerage of Ireland
New creation	Earl of Ardglass; 1645–1653	Succeeded by Wingfield Cromwell
New creation	Viscount Lecale; 1624–1653	Succeeded by Wingfield Cromwell
Peerage of England
Preceded by Edward Cromwell	Baron Cromwell; 1607–1653	Succeeded by Wingfield Cromwell
