= Thomas Cromwell, 3rd Earl of Ardglass =

English nobleman

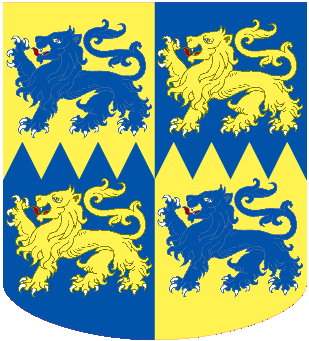
- Arms of Cromwell, Earl of Ardglass: Quarterly, per fess, indented, azure and or, four lions passant
- Tenure: 1668–1682
- Successor: Vere Essex Cromwell, 4th Earl of Ardglass
- Other titles: 3rd Viscount Lecale; 6th Baron Cromwell
- Known for: English nobleman
- Born: Thomas Cromwell; 29 November 1653; Strensham, Worcestershire, England
- Died: 11 April 1682 (aged 28–29); Ilam, Staffordshire, England
- Buried: St Patrick's Cathedral, Dublin
- Spouse: Honora Boyle
- Parents: Wingfield Cromwell, 2nd Earl of Ardglass; Mary Russell

Thomas Cromwell, 3rd Earl of Ardglass (29 November 1653 – 11 April 1682), was an English nobleman, the only son of Wingfield Cromwell, 2nd Earl of Ardglass of Ilam, Staffordshire and Mary Russell. He held the subsidiary titles of 3rd Viscount Lecale and 6th Baron Cromwell of Oakham.

== Life ==
He succeeded to the titles of 6th Baron Cromwell of Oakham, in the Peerage of England (1540), 3rd Viscount Lecale, in Ulster, in the Peerage of Ireland (1624) and 3rd Earl of Ardglass, in the Peerage of Ireland (1645) on 3 October 1668. On 29 of the same month and year he matriculated at Christ Church, University of Oxford. He married Honora Boyle (d. c. November 1710, buried 14 November 1710 St Patrick's Cathedral, Dublin), sister and co-heiress of Murrough Boyle, 1st Viscount Blesington, daughter of The Most Rev. Michael Boyle, DD, Archbishop of Armagh and Lord Chancellor of Ireland, without issue.

== Death ==
Thomas Cromwell died on 11 April 1682 and was buried at Ilam, Staffordshire. He was succeeded by his uncle Vere Essex Cromwell, 4th Earl of Ardglass. His widow Honora, married secondly, before 1687, Francis Cuffe (12 September 1656 – 26 December 1694), Member of Parliament for County Mayo in the Parliament of Ireland, son of Sir James Cuffe of Ballinrobe, County Mayo, and had issue, and married thirdly, c. 1700, as his first wife Captain Sir Thomas Burdett, 1st Baronet, of Garahill, County Carlow (14 September 1668 – 14 April 1727), without issue. She died in November 1710 and was buried at St Patrick's Cathedral, Dublin.

== Bibliography ==
- "Ardglass, Earl of (I, 1645 – 1687). Cracroft's Peerage". Cracroftspeerage.co.uk. Archived from the original on 16 March 2012.
- Burke, Bernard (1866). A Genealogical History of the dormant, abeyant, forfeited and extinct peerages of the British Empire. London: Harrison.
- Cokayne, G. E. (1910). Gibbs, Vicary (ed.). The Complete Peerage of England, Scotland, Ireland, Great Britain and the United Kingdom, Extant, Extinct or Dormant, vol. I. London: St. Catherine Press.
- Cokayne, G. E. (1913). Gibbs, Vicary (ed.). The Complete Peerage of England, Scotland, Ireland, Great Britain and the United Kingdom, vol. III. London: St. Catherine Press.
- Cokayne, G. E. (2000). Gibbs, Vicary; et al. (eds.). The Complete Peerage of England, Scotland, Ireland, Great Britain and the United Kingdom, Extant, Extinct or Dormant, vol. I (new ed.). Gloucester: Alan Sutton Publishing.
- "Cromwell, Baron (E, 1540 – 1687). Cracroft's Peerage". Cracroftspeerage.co.uk.
- "Thomas Cromwell, Earl of Ardglass, Family Search: Community Trees. British Isles. Peerage, Baronetage, and Landed Gentry Families with Extended Lineage". Histfam.familysearch.org.

Peerage of Ireland
Preceded by Wingfield Cromwell	Earl of Ardglass; 1668–1682	Succeeded by Vere Essex Cromwell
