= Lord Carrington (disambiguation) =

Lord Carrington or Lord Carington may refer to:

- Baron Carrington, a hereditary title created in 1796 and 1797
  - Peter Carington, 6th Baron Carrington, Baron Carington of Upton (1919–2018), British Conservative politician
- Matthew Carrington, Baron Carrington of Fulham (born 1947), British banker and Conservative politician

== See also ==
- Viscount Carrington, a hereditary title created in 1643 and became extinct in 1706
- Charles Wynn-Carington, 1st Earl Carrington (1843–1928), British Liberal politician and Governor of New South Wales
