= Rupert Carington =

Rupert Carington may refer to:

- Rupert Carington, 4th Baron Carrington (1852–1929), British soldier and Liberal Party politician
- Rupert Carington, 5th Baron Carrington (1891–1938), British peer, son of the 4th Baron Carrington
- Rupert Carington, 7th Baron Carrington (born 1948), son of the 6th Baron Carrington, grandson of the 5th Baron
