= Arnold Keppel =

Arnold Keppel may refer to:

- Arnold Keppel, 8th Earl of Albemarle (1858–1942), British soldier, courtier and politician
- Arnold Keppel (writer) (1884–1964), English journalist, writer and landowner
