= Diana Keppel, Countess of Albemarle =

British noblewoman

Dame Diana Cicely Keppel, Countess of Albemarle DBE (née Grove, 6 August 1909 – 6 May 2013) married Walter Egerton George Lucian Keppel, son of Arnold Allen Cecil Keppel, 8th Earl of Albemarle, as his second wife on 24 February 1931 at St Columba's Church, London. She became Countess of Albemarle from 12 April 1942 when her husband became the 9th Earl of Albemarle.

== Background ==
The daughter of Major John Archibald Grove and his wife Cicely, she was educated at the Sherborne School for Girls, Sherborne, Dorset.

== Honours ==
She was chairman of the Albemarle Report on Youth and Development in the Community in 1960. She was appointed Dame Commander of the Order of the British Empire (DBE) in 1956. She received honorary degrees from the University of Reading (1959, D.Litt.), the University of London (1960, LLD) and the University of Oxford (1960, DCL).

By 1999, she was living at Seymours, Melton, near Woodbridge, Suffolk. She was the Dowager Countess of Albemarle from the death of her husband in 1979 until her death on 6 May 2013 at the age of 103. They had one daughter, Lady Anne-Louise Mary Keppel (17 March 1932 – 7 January 2017).

== Career ==
- Norfolk County Organiser, Women's Voluntary Service, 1939–1944
- Chairman, National Federation of Women's Institutes, 1946–1951
- Chairman, Development Commission, 1948–1974
- Chairman, Departmental Committee on Youth Service, 1958–1960
- Chairman, National Youth Employment Council, 1962–1968
- Vice-Chair, British Council, 1959–1974
- Member, Arts Council, 1951
- Member, Royal Commission on the Civil Service, 1954
- Member, UGG, 1956–1978
- Member, Standing Commission on Museums and Galleries, 1958–1971
- Member, English Local Government Boundary Commission, 1971–1977
- Life Trustee, Carnegie UK Trust, and Chairman, 1977–1982
- Member, Glyndebourne Arts Trust, 1968–1980

== Sources ==
- Peter W. Hammond, editor, The Complete Peerage or a History of the House of Lords and All its Members From the Earliest Times, Volume XIV: Addenda & Corrigenda (Stroud, Gloucestershire: Sutton Publishing, 1998), p. 18.
- Charles Mosley, editor, Burke's Peerage, Baronetage & Knightage, 107th edition, 3 volumes (Wilmington, Delaware: Burke's Peerage (Genealogical Books) Ltd, 2003), volume 1, p. 65.
- Charles Mosley, editor, Burke's Peerage and Baronetage, 106th edition, 2 volumes (Crans, Switzerland: Burke's Peerage (Genealogical Books) Ltd, 1999), volume 1, p. 49.
