= Lady Cynthia Postan =

British debutante, translator, and horticulturalist (1918–2017)

Lady Cynthia Postan, 1938.

Lady Cynthia Rosalie Postan (née Keppel; 25 June 1918 – 12 November 2017) was a British debutante, secretary for MI5, translator and editor, horticulturalist, and porcelain collector.

== Early life ==
Cynthia Rosalie Keppel was born at Daws Hill, in the grounds of Wycombe Abbey, on 25 June 1918, the fourth child of Walter Keppel, Viscount Bury, later the 9th Earl of Albemarle, and Lady Judith Sydney Myee Wynn-Carington, daughter of Charles Wynn-Carington, 1st Marquess of Lincolnshire. Her mother died of tuberculosis when Cynthia was nine.

She lived part of her childhood at her grandfather's house in Norfolk and was educated at a boarding school in Littlehampton. She trained as a shorthand typist at Mrs Hoster's Secretarial College in Brompton Road, London, and was presented to Edward VIII as a debutante in 1936. She was "finished" in Munich, Germany, in 1936.

== Career ==
During the Second World War, Postan worked as a secretary for MI5 after she was introduced to its head, Sir Vernon Kell, through family connections. She was initially stationed at Wormwood Scrubs where operation XX was in progress. She later worked at Blenheim Palace during which time Anthony Blunt, later revealed to be a Soviet spy, took her to lunch.

Transferred to London, Postan met her future husband, the University of Cambridge economic historian Michael Postan, who was head of the Russia section of the Ministry of Economic Warfare. They married in 1944 and had two sons together.

== Horticulture ==
Postan became a noted horticulturalist associated with the Royal Horticultural Society and was a specialist in the Rhododendron plant of which she edited a history. The Rhododendron Story: 200 years of plant hunting and garden cultivation. The Ceanothus Cynthia Postan, a Californian lilac originally known as Ceanothus x regius, now carries her name.

== Collecting ==
She formed an important collection of French porcelain which was sold in 2015.

== Death ==
Lady Cynthia died on 12 November 2017.

== Selected publications ==
=== Edited ===
- The Rhododendron Story: 200 Years of Plant Hunting and Garden Cultivation. Royal Horticultural Society, 1996. ISBN 978-1874431428

=== Translations ===
- Duby, Georges. (1968) Rural Economy and Country Life in the Medieval West. London: Edward Arnold.
- Bairoch, Paul. (1975) The Economic Development of the Third World since 1900. London: Methuen. ISBN 0416762301
- Duby, Georges. (1977) The Chivalrous Society. University of California Press. ISBN 0520028139
