= Charles Wynn-Carington, 1st Marquess of Lincolnshire =

British Liberal politician and aristocrat (1843–1928)

The Most Honourable The Marquess of Lincolnshire KG GCMG PC JP DL
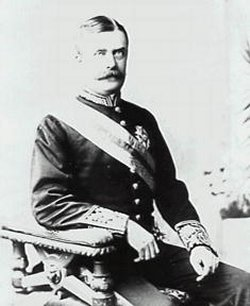

Lord Privy Seal
- In office 23 October 1911 – 13 February 1912
- Prime Minister: H. H. Asquith
- Preceded by: The Marquess of Crewe
- Succeeded by: The Marquess of Crewe

President of the Board of Agriculture
- In office 10 December 1905 – 23 October 1911
- Prime Minister: Sir Henry Campbell-Bannerman; H. H. Asquith
- Preceded by: Ailwyn Fellowes
- Succeeded by: Walter Runciman

Lord Chamberlain
- In office 15 August 1892 – 22 June 1895
- Prime Minister: William Ewart Gladstone; Lord Rosebery
- Preceded by: The Earl of Lathom
- Succeeded by: The Earl of Lathom

Governor of New South Wales
- In office 12 December 1885 – 3 November 1890
- Monarch: Victoria
- Preceded by: Lord Augustus Loftus
- Succeeded by: The Earl of Jersey

Captain of the Honourable Corps of Gentlemen-at-Arms
- In office 27 June 1881 – 6 July 1885
- Prime Minister: William Ewart Gladstone
- Preceded by: The Marquess of Huntly
- Succeeded by: The Earl of Coventry

Member of Parliament for Wycombe
- In office 24 July 1865 – 17 March 1868
- Preceded by: Martin Tucker Smith
- Succeeded by: William Carington

Member of the House of Lords
- Lord Temporal
- In office 17 March 1868 – 13 June 1928
- Preceded by: The 2nd Baron Carrington
- Succeeded by: The 4th Baron Carrington

Personal details
- Born: Charles Robert Carrington; 16 May 1843 Whitehall, London
- Died: 13 June 1928 (aged 85) Daws Hill House, High Wycombe, Buckinghamshire
- Party: Liberal
- Spouse: Hon. Cecilia Margaret Harbord (m. 1878–1928; his death)
- Children: 6
- Parent(s): Robert Carrington, 2nd Baron Carrington; Charlotte Drummond-Burrell
- Education: Trinity College, Cambridge

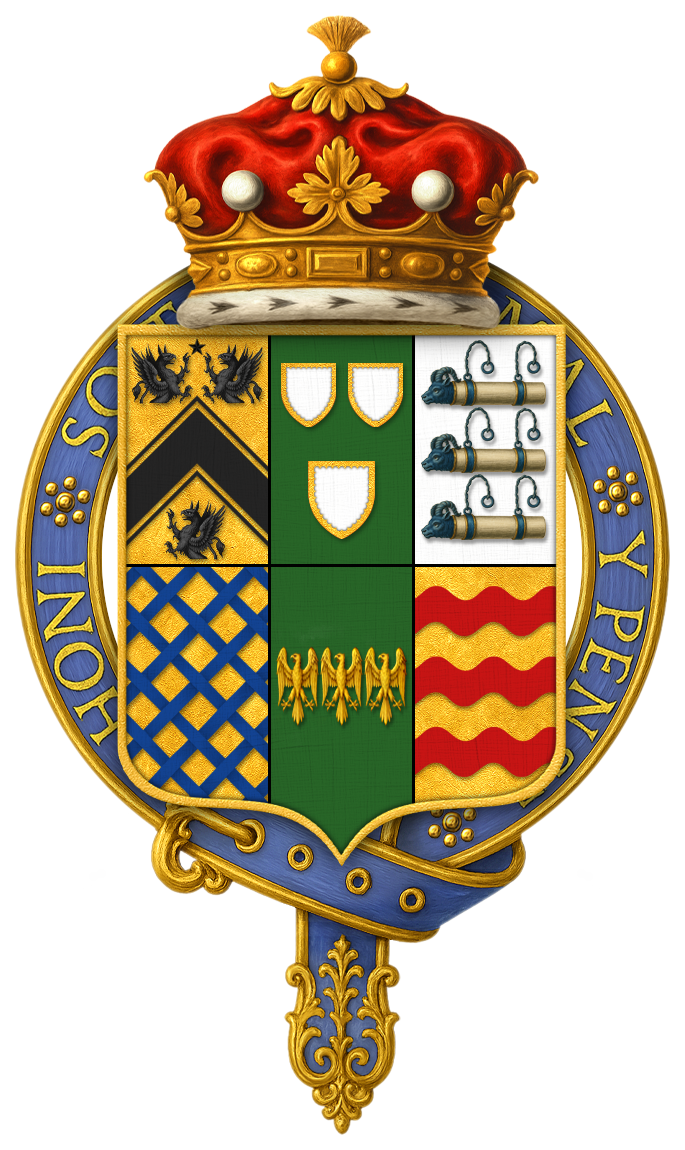
Quartered arms of Charles Wynn-Carington, 1st Marquess of Lincolnshire, KG, GCMG, PC, JP, DL

Charles Robert Wynn-Carington, 1st Marquess of Lincolnshire (16 May 1843 – 13 June 1928), known as the Lord Carrington from 1868 to 1895, and as the Earl Carrington from 1895 to 1912, was a British Liberal politician and aristocrat. He was Governor of New South Wales from 1885 to 1890.

== Background ==
Charles Robert Carrington was born at Whitehall on 16 May 1843, the son of Robert Carrington, 2nd Baron Carrington, and his second wife Charlotte, the younger daughter of Peter Drummond-Burrell, 22nd Baron Willoughby de Eresby. The Hon. Sir William Carington and Rupert Carington, 4th Baron Carrington, were his younger brothers, while Peter Carington, 6th Baron Carrington, was his grand-nephew. He was educated at Eton and Trinity College, Cambridge. He was a lifelong friend of King Edward VII, having first met him in 1854, and became his aide-de-camp when he was the Prince of Wales.

He served as a Captain in the Royal Horse Guards and in 1863 his father (as Lord Lieutenant of Buckinghamshire) commissioned him into the Royal Buckinghamshire Militia (King's Own). He commanded the regiment (by then the 3rd (Royal Bucks Militia) Battalion, Oxfordshire Light Infantry) from 1881 to 1886 as a Lieutenant-Colonel with the honorary rank of Colonel.

On his mother's death in 1879 he became joint hereditary Lord Great Chamberlain of England. Born Charles Carrington, he and his two brothers assumed by royal licence the surname of Carington in 1880. In 1896 he assumed by royal licence the surname of Wynn-Carington.

== Political career ==
Carrington sat in the House of Commons as a Liberal for High Wycombe from 1865 until he succeeded his father to the baronies in 1868. He served under William Ewart Gladstone as Captain of the Honourable Corps of Gentlemen-at-Arms from 1881 to 1885, and was sworn of the Privy Council in 1881.

Wynn-Carrington was in India 1875–1876, appointed to the Honourable Corps of Gentlemen at Arms during 1881–1885, and was appointed to be the Governor of New South Wales in 1885 until 1890 and was appointed to the Order of St Michael and St George as a Knight Grand Cross in June 1885. He again held office under Gladstone and later Lord Rosebery as Lord Chamberlain of the Household from 1892 to 1895. The latter year he was created Viscount Wendover, of Chepping Wycombe, in the County of Buckingham, and Earl Carrington.

In early 1901 he was appointed by King Edward VII to lead a special diplomatic mission to announce the King's accession to the governments of France, Spain, and Portugal. He also bore St Edward's Staff at the coronation of King Edward VII.

After the Liberals returned to power in 1905 he served as President of the Board of Agriculture between 1905 and 1911 and as Lord Privy Seal between 1911 and 1912, with a seat in the cabinet in Sir Henry Campbell-Bannerman and H. H. Asquith's ministries. He was made a Knight Companion of the Garter in 1906 and in 1912 he was further honoured when he was made Marquess of Lincolnshire.

A noted land reformer, Carrington was a supporter of Lloyd George's redistributive "People's Budget", which he regarded as "bold, Liberal and humane".

== Civic works and urban development ==
in 1896, Carrington sold his ancestral home, Wycombe Abbey, which then became a famous private girls' boarding-school. He proceeded to convert the Daws Hill farmhouse, at the top of the hill above the Abbey, into Daws Hill Lodge (later called Daws Hill House), a splendid country mansion fit for the guests, including royalty, whom he entertained there; and his family moved into this new home in 1901.

Carrington was central to the development of a new civic centre for High Wycombe. He laid out a new road, Queen Victoria Road, along the line of his carriage drive from the High Street to his property at St Mary Street. This new road later became the site of a new town hall, police station, public library, and council offices.

The local historian John Mayes described the extent of Carrington's commecial activity in the early twentieth century development of High Wycombe as follows: ‘The great landowners were busy with housing schemes. Lord Carrington laid out Hamilton Road, Benjamin Road and Roberts Road in the lower Hughenden district, Shrubbery Road off the Amersham Hill, and Desborough Avenue and Kitchener Road in the west.’

The size of Carrington's High Wycombe Estate, as passed on to his heirs, was estimated at 3,271 acres in 1937, including developable land on both sides of the Wycombe to Marlow Road as far as Harpers Heath, which was three miles from Wycombe, and two miles from Marlow.

== Freemasonry ==
Carrington was initiated into Isaac Newton University Lodge No. 859, Cambridge, on 28 October 1861 at the age of 18, passed in Cairo some eight years later, and raised in Royal York Lodge of Perseverance No. 7 on 6 October 1875. On 3 January 1882 he became a member of Royal Alpha Lodge No. 16. Even though he was not a past Master of a Lodge, he was appointed Senior Grand Warden of the United Grand Lodge of England in 1882.

When he became Governor of New South Wales, he found a rivalry of lodges working under the United Grand Lodge of England and the Grand Lodge of Scotland as well as lodges working under the locally formed (1877) Grand Lodge of New South Wales. Trying to unite the lodges, he became firstly District Grand Master of New South Wales, and then the first Grand Master of the newly consecrated United Grand Lodge of New South Wales. However, as he had still not yet been installed as a Worshipful Master, he was first made Worshipful Master at sight of the Lodge Ionic No. 15. Nine senior Masons were present, including Samuel Way. In 1890 he was appointed Provincial Grand Master of Buckinghamshire and after serving five years, he was made Grand Representative in England of the United Grand Lodge of New South Wales.

== Family ==
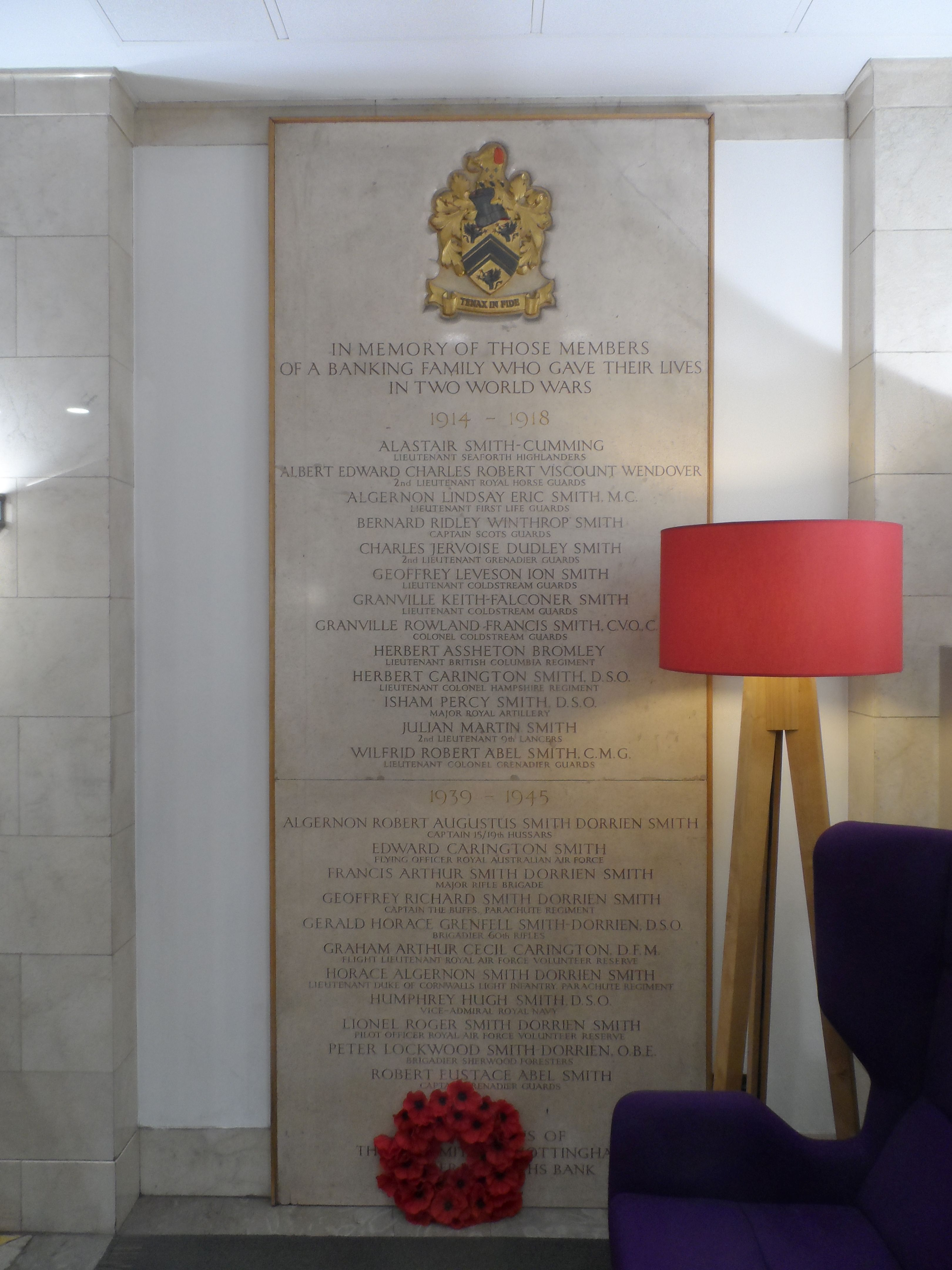
Viscount Wendover (Albert Edward Charles Robert Wynn-Carington, 1895–1915) named on a memorial to the members of the Smiths' banking family who died in the World Wars

Carrington married the Hon. Cecilia Margaret Harbord (1856–1934), daughter of Charles Harbord, 5th Baron Suffield, and Cecilia Annetta Baring, in 1878. They had one son and five daughters. Their only son, Albert Edward Charles Robert Wynn-Carington, Viscount Wendover (1895–1915), died on 19 May 1915 of complications following the amputation of an arm when he was wounded in the fighting at Ypres during World War I.

In addition to family life, Lord Carrington was logged by the police for homosexual activity: his name appears in one of the notebooks of the high-profile Scotland Yard detective Donald Swanson.

Lord Lincolnshire died at his home, Daws Hill House, High Wycombe, on 13 June 1928. The baronies (but not his other titles) passed to his younger brother, Rupert. The marquessate, earldom and viscountcy became extinct. Cecilia, Marchioness of Lincolnshire, died in 1934, aged 78.

=== Issue ===
	Life span	Marriage(s)	Notes
by Cecilia Margaret Harbord
Lady Marjorie Cecilia Wynn-Carington	1880–1968	Married Hon. Charles Wilson (later 2nd Baron Nunburnholme), son of Charles Wilson, 1st Baron Nunburnholme, and Florence Wellesley; had issue.	
Lady Alexandra Augusta Wynn-Carington	1881–1955	Married Col. William Palmer, son of Brig. George Palmer; had issue.	
Lady Ruperta Wynn-Carington	1883–1963	Married William Legge, Viscount Lewisham (later 7th Earl of Dartmouth), son of William Legge, 6th Earl of Dartmouth, and Lady Mary Coke; had issue.	
Lady Judith Sydney Myee Wynn-Carington	1889–1928	Married Walter Keppel, Viscount Bury (later 9th Earl of Albemarle), son of Arnold Keppel, 8th Earl of Albemarle, and Lady Gertrude Egerton; had issue.	
Lady Victoria Alexandrina Wynn-Carington	1892–1966	Married, firstly, Lt. Nigel Legge-Bourke, son of Sir Henry Legge and Amy Lambart; had issue.	Lt. Legge-Bourke, who was a first cousin of his brother-in-law Viscount Lewisham above, was killed in action in World War I.
Lady Victoria Alexandrina Wynn-Carington	1892–1966	Married, secondly, Major Hon. Edric Weld-Forester, son of Cecil Weld-Forester, 5th Baron Forester, and Emma Dixie; had issue.	
Albert Edward Charles Robert Wynn-Carington, Viscount Wendover	1895–1915		Viscount Wendover died from wounds received in action in World War I.

=== Other descendants ===
Among notable descendants are Stephen Wilson, 6th Baron Nunburnholme, Patrick Chichester, 8th Marquess of Donegall, and Rufus Keppel, 10th Earl of Albemarle.

Cousins Tiggy and Eleanor Legge-Bourke are his descendants through his fifth daughter; they are both granddaughters of politician Sir Harry Legge-Bourke, only son of Lt. Nigel Legge-Bourke.

== Ancestry ==
Ancestors of Charles Wynn-Carington, 1st Marquess of Lincolnshire

8. Abel Smith (1717–1788)
4. Robert Smith, 1st Baron Carrington (1752–1838)
9. Mary Bird (1724–1780)
2. Robert Carrington, 2nd Baron Carrington (1796–1868)
10. Lewyns Boldero-Barnard
5. Anne Boldero-Barnard (1756/57–1827)
11. Anne Popplewell
1. Charles Wynn-Carington, 1st Marquess of Lincolnshire
12. Peter Burrell, 1st Baron Gwydyr (1754–1820)
6. Peter Drummond-Burrell, 22nd Baron Willoughby de Eresby (1782–1865)
13. Priscilla Bertie, 21st Baroness Willoughby de Eresby (1761–1828)
3. Hon. Charlotte Drummond-Willoughby (1815–1879)
14. James Drummond, 1st Baron Perth (1744–1800)
7. Hon. Sarah Drummond (died 1865)
15. Hon. Clementina Elphinstone (died 1822)

Parliament of the United Kingdom
Preceded by Martin Tucker Smith; John Remington Mills	Member of Parliament for Wycombe; 1865–1868; With: John Remington Mills	Succeeded by Hon. William Carington
Political offices
Preceded by The Marquess of Huntly	Captain of the Honourable Corps of Gentlemen-at-Arms; 1881–1885	Succeeded by The Earl of Coventry
Preceded by Lord Augustus Loftus	Governor of New South Wales; 1885–1890	Succeeded by The Earl of Jersey
Preceded by The Earl of Lathom	Lord Chamberlain; 1892–1895	Succeeded by The Earl of Lathom
Preceded by Ailwyn Fellowes	President of the Board of Agriculture and Fisheries; 1905–1911	Succeeded by Walter Runciman
Preceded by The Earl of Crewe	Lord Privy Seal; 1911–1912	Succeeded by The Marquess of Crewe
Court offices
Preceded by The Marquess of Cholmondeley	Lord Great Chamberlain; 1910–1928	Succeeded by Viscount Lewisham
Honorary titles
Preceded by The Lord Rothschild	Lord Lieutenant of Buckinghamshire; 1915–1923	Succeeded by The Lord Cottesloe
Peerage of Ireland
Preceded by Robert Carrington	Baron Carrington; 2nd creation 1868–1928	Succeeded by Rupert Carington
Peerage of the United Kingdom
New creation	Marquess of Lincolnshire; 1912–1928	Extinct
New creation	Earl Carrington; 1895–1928	Extinct
Peerage of Great Britain
Preceded by Robert Carrington	Baron Carrington; 3rd creation 1868–1928; Member of the House of Lords (1868–1928)	Succeeded by Rupert Carington
