= Arnold Keppel (writer) =

Arnold Joost William Keppel (1884–1964) was an English journalist, writer and landowner. He served in the Royal Flying Corps, and during the 1920s was selected as a Labour Party parliamentary candidate.

== Early life ==
He was the second son of Arnold Keppel, 8th Earl of Albemarle, and was educated at Eton College and abroad.

== Times correspondent ==
Keppel was a special correspondent to The Times in 1911, covering the Makran Field Force. This was a naval expedition to the Makran region on the coast of the Gulf of Oman, straddling the modern border between Iran and Pakistan. A large-scale operation of its kind under the British Raj, it involved a thousand men of the 6th (Poona) Division. The naval commander was Edmond Slade, Commander in Chief, East Indies Station, who from 1909 escalated efforts in the region to prevent the Makran coast from being used for the smuggling of guns destined for Afghanistan.

In October 1910, Keppel arrived in India, looking for a gun-running story. He was in the North-West Frontier district in December of that year when the first engagement of the campaign occurred in Dubai. He made his way there by sea but was unable to land there. At Basra, he heard of the Field Force and went back to India to join it. He left India in April 1911. An engagement that was dubbed the Battle of Pashak Pass took place on 28 April between troops landed by Slade and commanded by Walter Sinclair Delamain, and Baluchi tribesmen, inland in the foothills of the Bashagard Mountains.

John Morley, the Secretary of State for India in London, considered that Slade had exceeded his orders. The Indian administration did not approve of Keppel's position with the Field Force, and denied him the use of the Persian Gulf Telegraph line at that point. Keppel did, however, manage to report to The Times, and later in the year compiled a book on the campaign. As he wrote, Muscat was a centre of the arms trade. In 1912 the British bought the co-operation of the Sultan of Muscat in bearing down on it.

In March 1912, Sir Walter Beaupré Townley, who was married to Keppel's aunt Lady Susan, became British ambassador to Persia. For a period, Keppel was an honorary attaché, in Bucharest and Teheran. From 1912 to 1914 he was again a correspondent for The Times, in Teheran. Keppel in fact disliked Lady Susan, but became embroiled through the career diplomat William James Garnett in the domestic affairs of the Townleys, which saw the military attaché Richard Steel sent home from Teheran after Lady Susan had made advances to him; and then Garnett sent away for interfering via Keppel.

From his travels, Keppel in 1912 donated a collection of cuneiform tablets, and a tile, thought to be from Amarna, to the Norwich Castle Museum in 1912. The tablets, with some omissions, later went to the World Museum in Liverpool.

== Later life ==
Keppel joined the Royal Flying Corps in 1914. He had the rank of lieutenant, and joined the Royal Air Force on its formation in 1918.

In early 1924, Keppel was selected as Labour Party candidate for Windsor. The sitting Tory candidate was Annesley Somerville, who had taught him at Eton. Before the general election of October 1924, however, he stood down as candidate, for health reasons. He was replaced by Christopher Crisp, son of the financier Birch Crisp.

== Works ==
In 1910 Keppel published an article "Grizzlies at Bear Lake" in the Badminton Magazine, relating to an area of British Columbia in what is now Bowron Lake Provincial Park. His books were:

- Gun-running and the Indian North-West Frontier (1911). The book is dedicated to Sir George Roos-Keppel. Roos-Keppel, a major figure on the North-West Frontier, was related to the Dutch Keppels but through a Swedish branch. Besides dealing with military matters, Keppel made social comments, for example on the role of the jirga for the Afridi.
- The Theory of the Cost-price System (1928). It was reviewed in the Economic Journal by Joseph Lemberger.

== Family ==
Keppel married three times:

- Firstly in 1921 to Dorris Lilian Carter, daughter of Oliver Carter of Burwell, Cambridgeshire. They were divorced in 1938.
- Secondly, on 30 April 1938 Annie Margaret Blanche Greenall née Purnell, widow of Gerald Vyvyan Greenall MC; she died in 1949.
- Thirdly, in 1952 Mildred Carter née Rodber, widow of Allan Stanley Carter of the RAF.
