= Francis Smith, 2nd Viscount Carrington =

English peer

Francis Smith, 2nd Viscount Carrington (c. 1621 – 7 April 1701), was an English peer.

== Biography ==
Smith was the son of Charles Smyth, 1st Viscount Carrington, by his wife Elizabeth Caryll, daughter of Sir John Caryll, of South Harting, Sussex. He succeeded in the viscountcy in 1665 when his father was murdered at Pontoise, France by one of his servants. He was admitted to Gray's Inn on 10 March 1674. In 1687 he was appointed Lord-Lieutenant of Worcestershire by James II, being excused as a Catholic the taking of the oaths of supremacy and allegiance.

== Family ==
Lord Carrington married firstly Juliana Walmesley, daughter of Sir Thomas Walmesley, of Dunkenhalgh, Lancashire. After her death he married secondly Lady Anne Herbert, daughter of William Herbert, 1st Marquess of Powis, in 1687. He died in April 1701. As he had no surviving children the viscountcy passed to his younger brother, Charles. Lady Carrington died in May 1748.

Honorary titles
Preceded by The Earl of Plymouth	Lord Lieutenant of Worcestershire; 1687–1689	Succeeded by The Duke of Shrewsbury
Peerage of Ireland
Preceded by Charles Smyth	Viscount Carrington; 1665–1701	Succeeded by Charles Smith
Peerage of England
Preceded by Charles Smyth	Baron Carrington; 1665–1701	Succeeded by Charles Smith
