= M. M. Postan =

British historian (1899–1981)

Sir M. M. Postan FBA
- Born: Michael Moissey Postan; 24 September 1899; Bendery, Bessarabia Governorate, Russian Empire
- Died: 12 December 1981 (aged 82); Cambridge, Cambridgeshire, England
- Other name: Munia Postan
- Spouse(s): Eileen Power (m. 1937; died 1940) Lady Cynthia Keppel (m. 1944)
- Children: 2

Academic background
- Education: University of Kiev
- Academic advisor: Eileen Power

Academic work
- Discipline: Historian
- Sub-discipline: European history; economic history; economic history of Europe (1000 AD – present)
- Institutions: University College London; London School of Economics; University of Cambridge
- Doctoral students: Eric Hobsbawm

Sir Michael Moissey Postan (24 September 1899 – 12 December 1981) was a British historian. He was known informally as Munia Postan.

== Biography ==
Postan was born to a Jewish family in Bendery, in the Bessarabia Governorate of the Russian Empire, and studied at the St Vladimir University in Kiev, leaving Russia in 1919 after the October Revolution and settling in the UK. He became a British citizen in 1926.

He held positions at University College London and at the London School of Economics. He was then elected a fellow of Peterhouse, Cambridge in 1935, and appointed Professor of Economic History at the University of Cambridge in 1937. He was known as an economic historian of medieval Europe. Eric Hobsbawm notes he was one of the best lecturers at Cambridge, adding, "Though passionately anti-communist, Postan was the only man in Cambridge who knew Marx, Weber, Sombart and the rest of the great central and East Europeans, and took their work sufficiently seriously to expound and criticise it."

As with many academic, Postan offered his services to the British government during the Second World War. He was head of the Russian section of the Ministry of Economic Warfare from 1939 to 1942. Then, he joined the team of Keith Hancock who was overseeing the official civil history of the war; Postan took responsibility for the history of war production.

Postan retired in 1965, and was made professor emeritus by Cambridge and an honorary fellow at his college, Peterhouse.

== Personal life ==
He married historian Eileen Power in 1937; she died in 1940. In 1944, he married Lady Cynthia Rosalie Keppel, daughter of the 9th Earl of Albemarle, with whom he had two sons.

He died on 12 December 1981 in Cambridge, England.

== Works ==
- Studies in English Trade in the 15th Century (1933) with Eileen Power
- The Historical Method in Social Science An Inaugural Lecture (1939)
- British War Production (1952, HMSO). (Part of the History of the Second World War, United Kingdom Civil Series)
- Carte Nativorum: A Peterborough Abbey Cartulary of the Fourteenth Century (1960) with C. N. L. Brooke
- Design and Development of Weapons : Studies in Government and Industrial Organisation (1964) with D. Hay and J. D. Scott. HMSO (Part of the History of the Second World War, United Kingdom Civil Series)
- Cambridge Economic History of Europe from the Decline of the Roman Empire

I: The Agrarian Life of the Middle Ages 2nd edition 1966, editor excerpt and text search
II: Trade and Industry in the Middle Ages (1952) edited with Edward Miller and Cynthia Postan
III: Economic Organization and Policies in the Middle Ages (1963) edited with E. E. Rich and Edward Miller
IV: The Cambridge Economic History of Europe, Volume IV: The Economy of Expanding Europe in the Sixteenth and Seventeenth Centuries, edited with E. E. Rich and Edward Miller
V: The Cambridge Economic History of Europe. Volume V: The Economic Organization of Early Modern Europe (1977) edited by E. E. Rich and C. H. Wilson
VI: The Industrial Revolutions and After (1966) edited with H. J. Habbakuk
VII: The Industrial Economies: Capital, Labour and Enterprise (1978) edited with Peter Mathias, Part 2 extending to the United States, Japan and Russia
VIII: The Industrial Economies: The Development of Economic and Social Policies (1989) edited by Peter Mathias and Sidney Pollard

- An Economic History of Western Europe 1945 - 1964 (1967)
- Fact and Relevance: Essays on Historical Method (1971)
- The Medieval Economy and Society: Economic History of Britain, 1100-1500 (1972) Pelican Economic History of Britain #1
- Essays on Medieval Agriculture and General Problems of the Medieval Economy (1973)
- Medieval Trade and Finance (1973)
