= Walter Keppel, 9th Earl of Albemarle =

British nobleman and soldier (1882–1979)

Colonel The Right Honourable The Earl of Albemarle MC DL
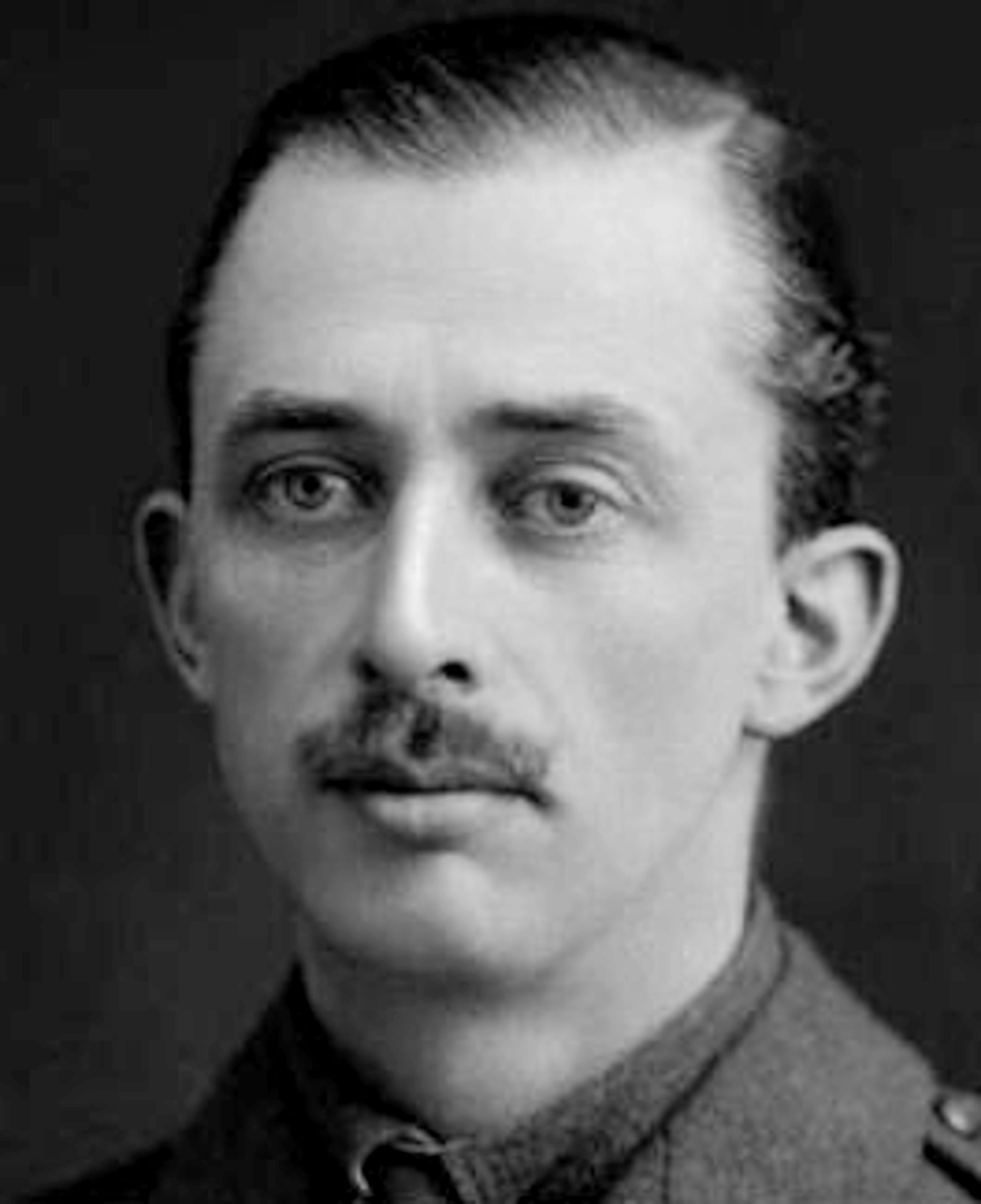
- Keppel in February 1918

Member of the House of Lords
- Lord Temporal
- In office 12 April 1942 – 14 July 1979
- Preceded by: The 8th Earl of Albemarle
- Succeeded by: The 10th Earl of Albemarle

Personal details
- Born: Walter Egerton George Lucian Keppel; 28 February 1882
- Died: 14 July 1979 (aged 97)
- Spouses: Lady Judith Wynn-Carrington (m. 1909; died 1928) Diana Grove (m. 1931)
- Children: Lady Cecilia McKenna; Derek Keppel, Viscount Bury; The Hon. Walter Keppel; Lady Cynthia Postan; The Hon. Richard Keppel; Lady Anne-Louise Hamilton-Dalrymple
- Parents: Arnold Keppel, 8th Earl of Albemarle; Lady Gertrude Egerton
- Education: Eton College

Colonel Walter Egerton George Lucian Keppel, 9th Earl of Albemarle (28 February 1882 – 14 July 1979), was a British nobleman and soldier, styled Viscount Bury from 1894 to 1942.

== Life ==
Keppel was the eldest son of Arnold Keppel, 8th Earl of Albemarle, and his wife, Lady Gertrude Egerton. He was educated at Eton from 1895 to 1899.

Lord Bury was commissioned as a second lieutenant in the Prince of Wales's Own Norfolk Artillery on 28 March 1900, and promoted to a lieutenant in that regiment on 25 August 1900. This was a Royal Artillery Militia regiment, and the following year he transferred to the regular army as a second lieutenant in the Scots Guards from 4 May 1901. He was seconded for staff service at the end of 1904, and appointed aide-de-camp (ADC) to Earl Grey, Governor General of Canada. He was again seconded for staff service in May 1907 and appointed extra ADC to Sir H. J. Goold-Adams, Lieutenant-Governor Orange River Colony.

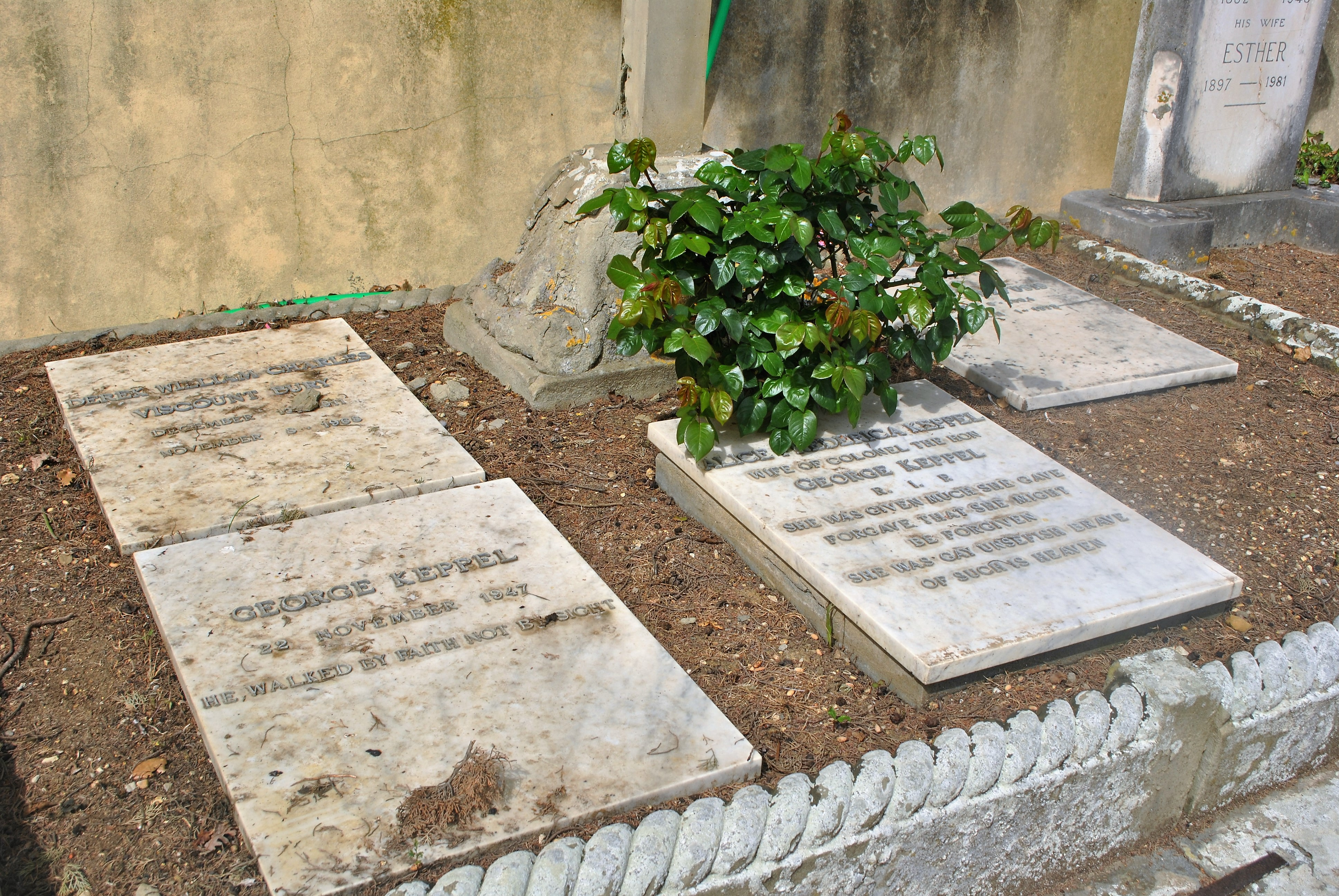
Cimitero degli Allori, Derek Keppel, Viscount Bury

Bury was promoted to captain in May 1910 and retired to the Special Reserve in 1912.

Bury fought with the Scots Guards during World War I. He was appointed a Deputy Lieutenant of Norfolk in January 1916. He was awarded the Military Cross in June 1916. He was promoted temporary Major while commanding a Guards machine gun company and later served as a Machine Gun Corps instructor. After the war, Bury was a member of the London County Council in 1919.

He stood unsuccessfully as a Conservative for Altrincham in 1910.

In 1924, he was made brevet colonel of 108th Field Brigade, Norfolk and Suffolk Yeomanry.

He succeeded his father as Earl of Albemarle in 1942. Albemarle was Vice-Lieutenant of Norfolk from 1940 to 1944, and a member of Norfolk County Council in 1943.

He died in 1979 and was succeeded as Earl of Albemarle by his grandson Rufus: his eldest son, Derek Viscount Bury, had died in 1968.

== Family ==
Lord Bury married, at St. Margaret's Church, Westminster on 9 June 1909, Lady Judith Sydney Myee Wynn-Carrington, daughter of Charles Wynn-Carington, 1st Marquess of Lincolnshire. They had five children before her death in 1928:

- Lady Cecilia Elizabeth Keppel (12 April 1910 – 16 June 2003), married Lt-Col. David McKenna, son of banker and politician Reginald McKenna, and has issue
- Derek Keppel, Viscount Bury (18 December 1911 – 8 November 1968), married 1st Lady Mairi Vane-Tempest-Stewart (issue, two daughters) and second Marina Orloff-Davidoff (1937–2020), and had an only son, Rufus Arnold Alexis Keppel (born 16 July 1965), who succeeded his grandfather on 14 July 1979 as 10th Earl of Albemarle, Viscount Bury, and Baron Ashford.
- Lt-Cdr. Hon. Walter Arnold Crispin Keppel (6 December 1914 – 1986), father of Judith Keppel, the first person to win one million pounds on the UK version of Who Wants to Be a Millionaire?.
- Lady Cynthia Rosalie Keppel (25 June 1918 – 12 November 2017), married Professor Sir Michael Postan (d. 1981) and has issue
- Hon. Richard Edward Harry Keppel (3 November 1924 – 2 March 1953)

He married Diana Grove (1909–2013) on 24 February 1931 at Scots Church, Chelsea. They had one daughter:

- Lady Anne-Louise Mary Keppel (17 March 1932 – 7 January 2017), married Sir Hew Hamilton-Dalrymple, 10th Baronet. She was a Patroness of the Royal Caledonian Ball.

== Arms ==
Coat of arms of Walter Keppel, 9th Earl of Albemarle
Coronet Coronet of an Earl. Crest Out of a ducal coronet or, a swan's head and neck argent. Escutcheon Gules, three escallops argent. Supporters Two lions ducally crowned or. Motto Ne cede malis (Yield not to adversity)

== Notes ==
Peerage of England
Preceded by Arnold Keppel	Earl of Albemarle; 1942–1979; Member of the House of Lords (1942–1979)	Succeeded by Rufus Keppel
