= Rupert Carington, 4th Baron Carrington =

British politician (1852–1929)

The Right Honourable The Lord Carrington CVO, DSO, DL

Member of Parliament for Buckinghamshire
- In office 27 April 1880 – 18 December 1885
- Preceded by: Nathaniel Lambert
- Succeeded by: Constituency abolished

Member of the House of Lords
- Lord Temporal
- In office 13 June 1928 – 11 November 1929
- Preceded by: The 1st Marquess of Lincolnshire
- Succeeded by: The 5th Baron Carrington

Personal details
- Born: 18 December 1852
- Died: 11 November 1929 (aged 76)
- Party: Liberal
- Spouse: Edith Horsefall
- Children: Rupert Carington, 5th Baron Carrington
- Parent(s): Robert Carrington, 2nd Baron Carrington; The Hon. Charlotte Drummond-Burrell

Rupert Clement George Carington, 4th Baron Carrington (18 December 1852 – 11 November 1929), known as the Hon. Rupert Carington from 1868 to 1928, was a British soldier and Liberal Party politician.

== Background ==
Carington was the third son of Robert Carrington, 2nd Baron Carrington, by his second wife the Hon. Charlotte Augusta Annabella, daughter of Peter Drummond-Burrell, 22nd Baron Willoughby de Eresby, and Lady Sarah Clementina Drummond. Charles Wynn-Carington, 1st Marquess of Lincolnshire, and Sir William Carington were his elder brothers.

== Military career ==
Carington fought in the Anglo-Zulu War of 1879 as a lieutenant in the Grenadier Guards. He volunteered for service again in the Second Boer War, where he was a commanding officer in the 3rd New South Wales Imperial Bushmen. For his service in the war, he was appointed to the Distinguished Service Order (DSO) in 1902.

== Political career ==
Between 1880 and 1885 he sat as Member of Parliament for Buckinghamshire. He was appointed to be a deputy lieutenant of Buckinghamshire in 1887. In 1928, he succeeded as fourth Baron Carrington on the death of his elder brother Lord Lincolnshire.

== Family ==
Carrington married Edith Horsefall, daughter of John Horsefall and Mary Maiden, in 1891. She died in 1908. Carrington survived her by 21 years and died in November 1929, aged 76. He was succeeded in his titles by his son Rupert. Former Foreign Secretary Peter Carington, 6th Baron Carrington, was his grandson.

Parliament of the United Kingdom
| Preceded by Nathaniel Lambert; Sir Robert Harvey, Bt; Thomas Fremantle | Member of Parliament for Buckinghamshire; 1880–1885; With: Sir Robert Harvey, Bt; Thomas Fremantle | Constituency abolished |
Peerage of Ireland
| Preceded by Charles Wynn-Carington | Baron Carrington; 2nd creation 1928–1929 | Succeeded by Rupert Carington |
Peerage of Great Britain
| Preceded by Charles Wynn-Carington | Baron Carrington; 3rd creation 1928–1929; Member of the House of Lords (1928–1929) | Succeeded by Rupert Carington |
