= Rupert Carington, 5th Baron Carrington =

British peer (1891–1938)

The Right Honourable The Lord Carrington JP DL

Member of the House of Lords
- Lord Temporal
- In office 11 November 1929 – 19 November 1938
- Preceded by: The 4th Baron Carrington
- Succeeded by: The 6th Baron Carrington

Personal details
- Born: 20 December 1891
- Died: 19 November 1938 (aged 46)
- Spouse: Sybil Marion Colville
- Children: 2, including Peter
- Parent(s): Rupert Carington, 4th Baron Carrington; Edith Horsefall

Rupert Victor John Carington, 5th Baron Carrington (20 December 1891 – 19 November 1938) was a British peer.

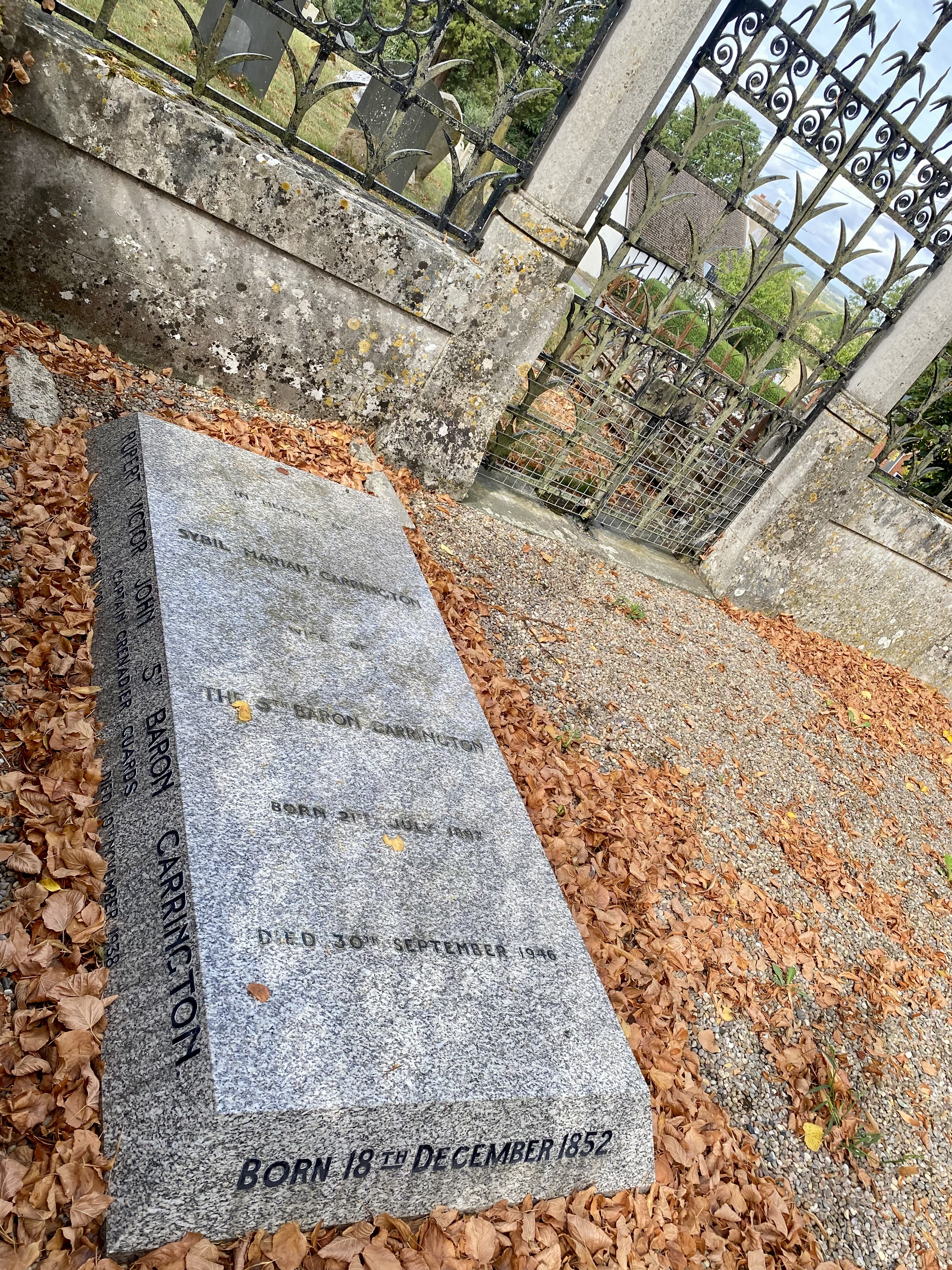
The grave of Carrington and his wife Sybil at St Mary's, Moulsoe in Buckinghamshire

== Life ==
He succeeded to the title in 1929. Carrington was the son of Rupert Carington, 4th Baron Carrington, and Edith, daughter of John Horsefall and Mary Maiden. He fought in the First World War as a captain in the Grenadier Guards and was twice wounded. After the war, he served as a Deputy Lieutenant and Justice of the Peace for Devon. He succeeded his father in the barony in 1929, but never spoke in the House of Lords.

== Family ==
Lord Carrington married the Hon. Sybil Marion Colville, daughter of his half-cousin Charles Colville, 2nd Viscount Colville of Culross, in 1916. They had one son and one daughter. He died in November 1938, aged 46, and was succeeded by his only son, Peter, who became a prominent Conservative politician. Lady Carrington died in December 1946.

Peerage of Ireland
Preceded by Rupert Carington	Baron Carrington; 2nd creation 1929–1938	Succeeded by Peter Carington
Peerage of Great Britain
Preceded by Rupert Carington	Baron Carrington; 3rd creation 1929–1938; Member of the House of Lords (1929–1938)	Succeeded by Peter Carington
