= Rupert Carington, 7th Baron Carrington =

British banker and peer (born 1948)

The Right Honourable The Lord Carrington DL
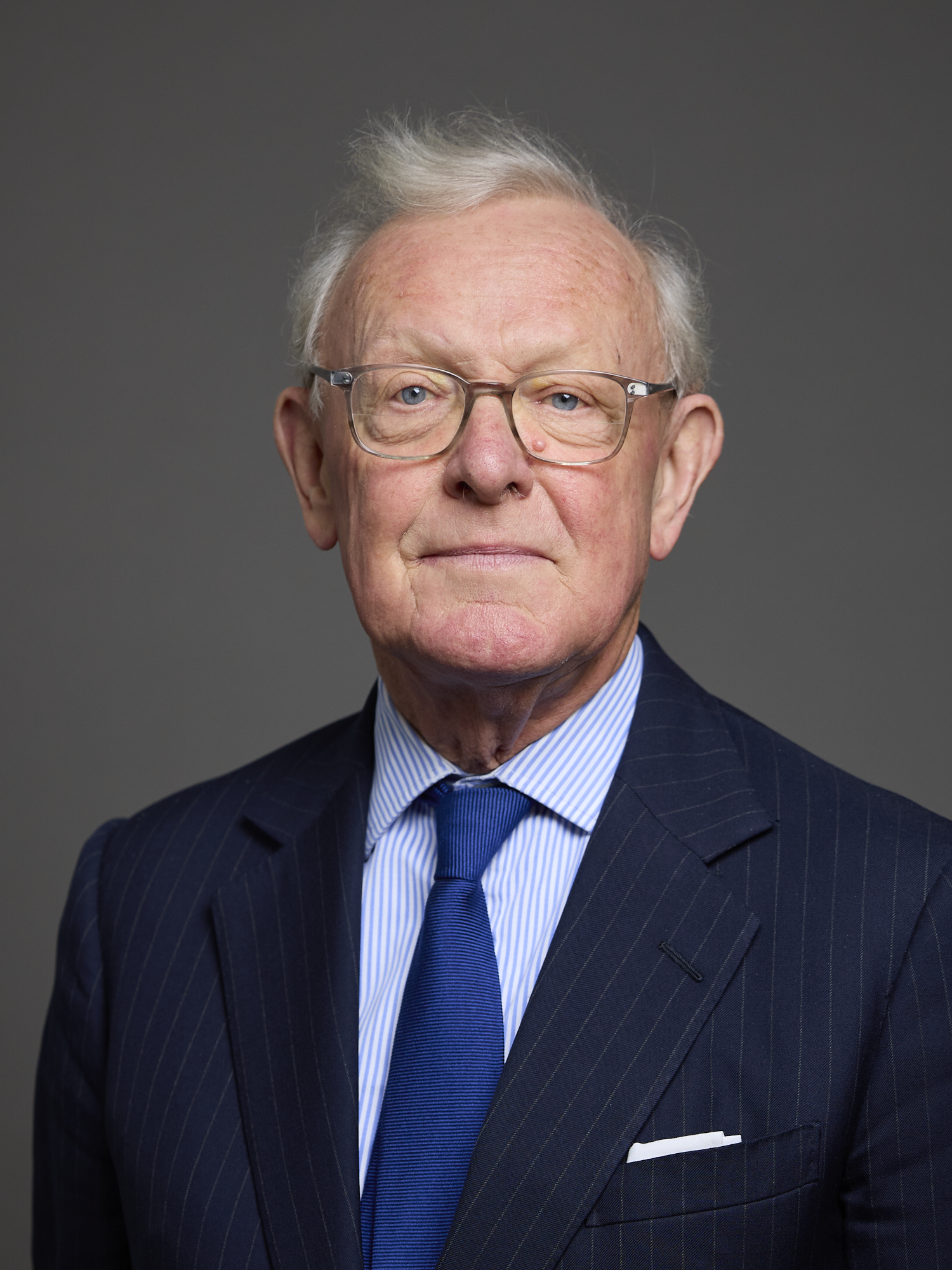
- Official portrait, 2024

Lord Great Chamberlain
- Incumbent
- Assumed office 8 September 2022
- Monarch: Charles III
- Preceded by: The 7th Marquess of Cholmondeley

Member of the House of Lords
- Lord Temporal
- Elected hereditary peer 4 December 2018 – 29 April 2026
- Preceded by: The 5th Baron Northbourne
- Succeeded by: Seat abolished (Note: Pursuant to the House of Lords (Hereditary Peers) Act 2026.)
- Ex officio member as Lord Great Chamberlain; 8 September 2022 – 29 April 2026
- Preceded by: The 7th Marquess of Cholmondeley
- Succeeded by: Seat abolished

Personal details
- Born: Rupert Francis John Carington; 2 December 1948 (age 77)
- Party: Crossbench
- Spouse: Daniela Diotallevi (m. 1989)
- Children: 3
- Parents: Peter Carington, 6th Baron Carrington; Iona McClean
- Education: Eton College; University of Bristol

Rupert Francis John Carington, 7th Baron Carrington (born 2 December 1948), is a British banker, hereditary peer and former crossbench member of the House of Lords.

Lord Carrington has served as Lord Great Chamberlain of England since the accession of Charles III in September 2022. In that role, he took part in the coronation of Charles III and Camilla.

== Early life ==
Carrington was born in 1948 as the third child and only son of Peter Carington, 6th Baron Carrington (1919–2018), and his wife Iona née McClean (1920–2009). His father was at the time in the beginning of his political career and would later hold several prominent positions, including those of Defence Secretary in the Heath ministry and Foreign Secretary in the first Thatcher ministry, and Secretary General of NATO.

He was educated at Eton College, and then the University of Bristol, where he graduated with a bachelor's degree.

Carrington has two sisters, Alexandra (born 1943), married to Captain Peter de Bunsen, and Virginia (born 1946), married to Henry Cubitt, 4th Baron Ashcombe (divorced).

His maternal grandfather was civil engineer and aviator Sir Francis McClean. His patrilineal ancestor Thomas Smith was the founder of Smith's Bank.

== Career ==
Carrington worked at the merchant bank Morgan, Grenfell & Co. for seventeen years before starting his own financial advisory business, Rupert Carington Limited, in 1987. He is chairman of Vietnam Infrastructure Ltd. and of Schroder AsiaPacific Fund, and is an international adviser to the LGT Group.

He succeeded his father as Baron Carrington in July 2018, and became a member of the House of Lords in December of that year, after winning a crossbench hereditary peers' by-election, following the retirement of Lord Northbourne.

On the accession of Charles III in 2022, Carrington became Lord Great Chamberlain of England, according to the hereditary rotation of the office among three noble families.

== Personal life ==
Carrington married Daniela Diotallevi on 12 September 1989; they have three children, including Robert Peter Flavio Carington, heir apparent.

== Honours ==
Lord Carrington was appointed a Deputy Lieutenant for Buckinghamshire in November 1999.

== Notes ==
Peerage of Ireland
Preceded by Peter Carington	Baron Carrington; 2nd creation 2018–present	Incumbent; Heir apparent: Hon. Robert Carington
Peerage of Great Britain
Preceded by Peter Carington	Baron Carrington; 3rd creation 2018–present	Incumbent; Heir apparent: Hon. Robert Carington
Parliament of the United Kingdom
Preceded by The Lord Northbourne	Elected hereditary peer to the House of Lords under the House of Lords Act 1999; 2018–2026	Seat abolished under the House of Lords (Hereditary Peers) Act 2026
Order of precedence in England and Wales
Preceded by Ambassadors and High Commissioners to the United Kingdom	Gentlemen as Lord Great Chamberlain	Followed by The Duke of Norfolk as Earl Marshal
Order of precedence in Northern Ireland
Preceded by Ambassadors and High Commissioners to the United Kingdom	Gentlemen as Lord Great Chamberlain	Followed by The Duke of Norfolk as Earl Marshal
Court offices
Preceded by The Marquess of Cholmondeley	Lord Great Chamberlain; 2022–present	Incumbent
