= Viscount Carrington =

Viscount Carrington, of Burford in the Province of Connaught, was a title in the Peerage of Ireland. It was created in 1643 for Charles Smyth, 1st Baron Carrington of Wootton Wawen, Warwickshire. He had only a few days earlier been created Baron Carrington, of Wootton in the County of Warwick, in the Peerage of England. His eldest son, Francis Smith, the second Viscount, served as Lord Lieutenant of Worcestershire from 1687 to 1689. He was succeeded by his younger brother, Charles Smith, the third Viscount. On his death in 1706 the titles became extinct. (This Smyth family was unrelated to the Smith (later Carington) family who became Barons Carrington of the second and third creations.)

== Viscounts Carrington (1643) ==
- Charles Smyth, 1st Viscount Carrington (1598–1665)
- Francis Smith, 2nd Viscount Carrington (c. 1621 – 1701)
- Charles Smith, 3rd Viscount Carrington (1635–1706)
