= Bashagard Mountains =

Mountain range in southeastern Iran

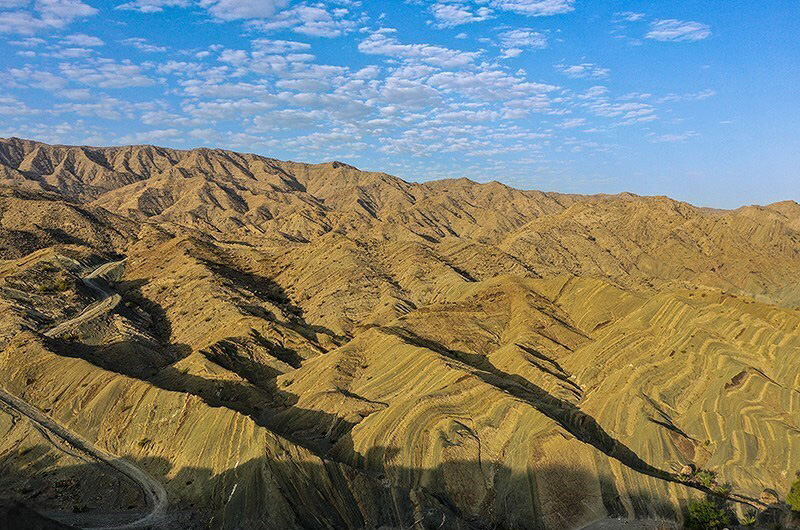
Bashagard Mountains

The Bashagard Mountains or the Bashagerd Mountains (also known as Bashagird or Bashakerd) is a mountain range that is located in southeast of Iran. The mountain range runs in an arc almost in a northwest-southeast direction from eastern parts of Hormozgan Province along the border with Kerman Province and stretching into southern part of Sistan and Baluchestan Province. With an elevation of 2185 metres, Mount Buniken (Kuh-e Buniken) is the highest point of the range located in the western section of the Bashagard Mountains, east of Sardasht in Bashagard County in Hormozgan Province, and in the vicinity of a place that marks the borders of Kerman, Hormozgan, and Sistan and Baluchestan provinces. Made of ophiolite, an assemblage of mafic igneous rocks representing remnants of former oceanic crust, the mountain range was formed finally in the Miocene and the Pliocene during the Alpine orogeny. The mountain range is located in a region with a hot semi-desert climate.

== Peaks ==
- Morderaz
