= Rufus Keppel, 10th Earl of Albemarle =

British designer (born 1965)

The Right Honourable The Earl of Albemarle

Member of the House of Lords
- Lord Temporal
- as a hereditary peer 14 July 1979 – 11 November 1999
- Preceded by: The 9th Earl of Albemarle
- Succeeded by: Seat abolished (Note: Pursuant to the House of Lords Act 1999.)

Personal details
- Born: Rufus Arnold Alexis Keppel; 16 July 1965 (age 60)
- Spouse: Sally Tadayon (m. 2001, divorced)
- Children: 1
- Education: St Christopher School, Letchworth; Chelsea School of Art
- Alma mater: Central St Martins School of Art & Design
- Occupation: British designer

Rufus Arnold Alexis Keppel, 10th Earl of Albemarle (born 16 July 1965), known as Viscount Bury from 1968 to 1979, is a British designer.

== Early life and education ==
Albemarle is the son of Derek Keppel, Viscount Bury (1911–1968), and his second wife, the former Marina Davidoff, a daughter of Count Serge Orloff-Davidoff. Since his father predeceased his grandfather, the 9th Earl of Albemarle, Keppel succeeded to the earldom at the age of fourteen on the death of his paternal grandfather in 1979. He is known professionally as Rufus Albemarle.

Keppel's early life was spent living with his parents successively in England and Italy. He was educated at St Christopher School, Letchworth, in Hertfordshire, and Chelsea School of Art in London, as well as Central St Martins School of Art & Design. He worked as an industrial designer in Milan and a graphic and branding designer in New York, where he later founded a men's-shirt company Albemarle of London. He is now residing in the United Kingdom.

== Marriage and issue ==
Albemarle married Sally Claire Tadayon, a sculptor of Danish and Persian ancestry, in 2001 in Havana, Cuba. Tom Ford of Yves St Laurent designed the bride's gown and the wedding was featured in Town & Country and Vanity Fair.

Later divorced, they have one child, who is heir apparent to the earldom:

- Augustus Sergei Darius Keppel, Viscount Bury, born in 2003.

== Lord Great Chamberlain ==
Through his grandmother, Albemarle has a one-twentieth share in the succession for the office of Lord Great Chamberlain, one of the Great Officers of State in England and Wales.

== Arms ==
Coat of arms of Rufus Keppel, 10th Earl of Albemarle
Coronet Coronet of an Earl. Crest Out of a ducal coronet or, a swan's head and neck argent. Escutcheon Gules, three escallops argent. Supporters Two lions ducally crowned or. Motto Ne cede malis (Yield not to adversity)

== Notes ==
Peerage of England
Preceded by Walter Keppel	Earl of Albemarle; 1979–present Member of the House of Lords (1979–1999)	Incumbent; Heir apparent: Augustus Keppel, Viscount Bury
