= Baron Carrington =

Barony in the Peerage of Great Britain

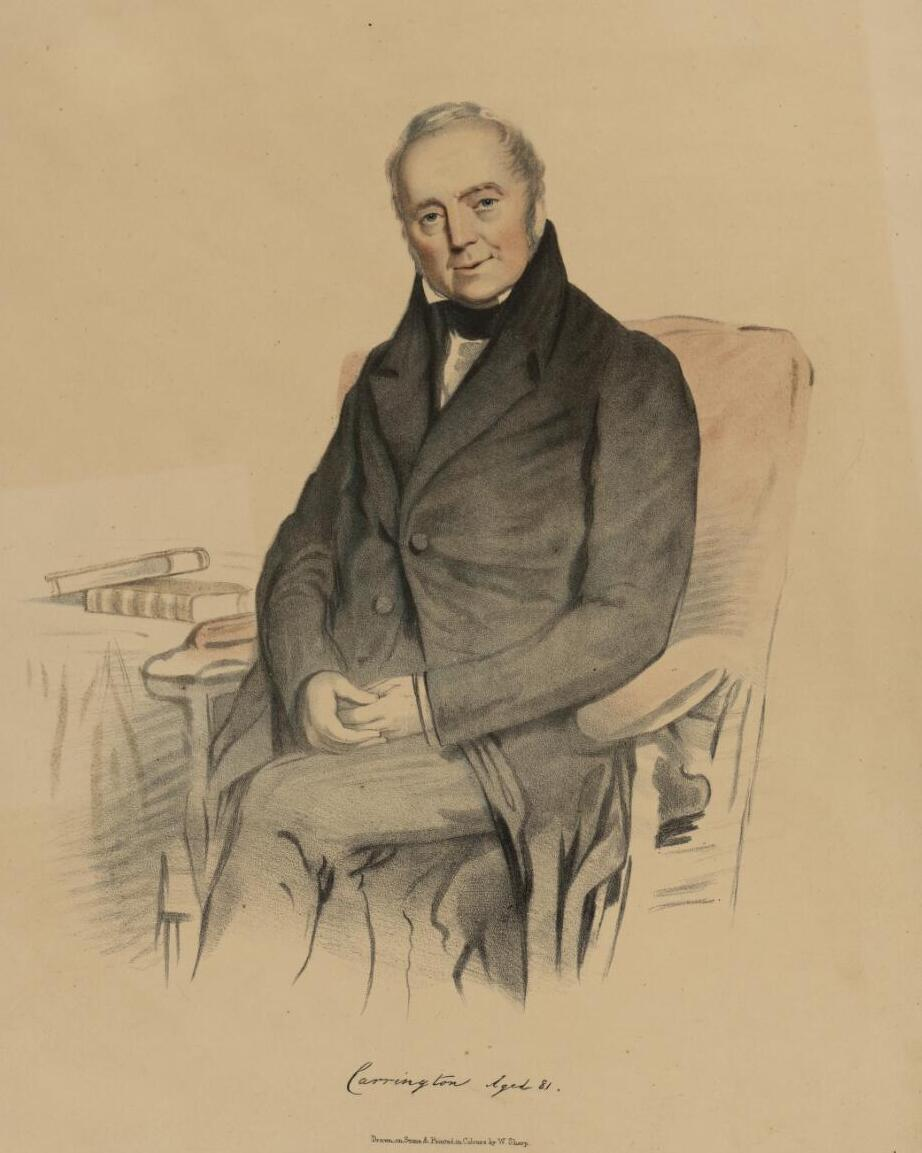
Robert Smith, 1st Baron Carrington

Baron Carrington is a title that has been created three times, once in the Peerage of England, once in the Peerage of Ireland and once in the Peerage of Great Britain.

== History ==
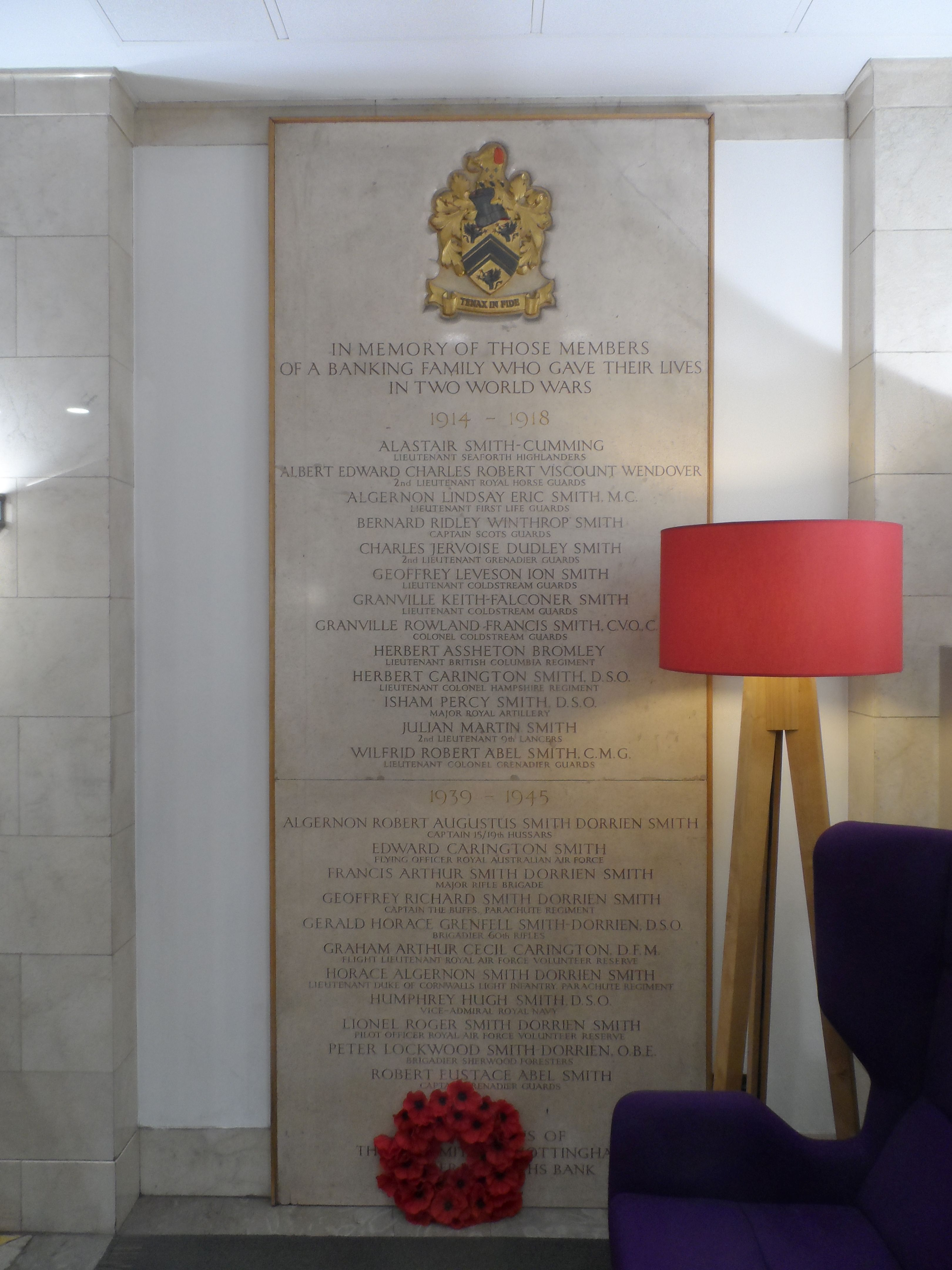
Memorial to members of the Smith banking family killed in action during the World Wars, including Viscount Wendover (Albert Wynn-Carington, 1895–1915)

The first creation came in the Peerage of England in 1643 in favour of Sir Charles Smyth, who became Baron Carrington of Wootton Wawen, Warwickshire. Only a few days later he was created Viscount Carrington in the Peerage of Ireland. He was succeeded by his two sons, but in 1706 the titles became extinct. For more information, see this title.

The second creation came in 1796 when Robert Smith was created Baron Carrington, of Bulcot Lodge, in the Peerage of Ireland. He had earlier represented Nottingham in the House of Commons. Only one year later, in 1797, he was made Baron Carrington, of Upton in the County of Nottingham, in the Peerage of Great Britain. This Smith family was unrelated to the Smyth family, Viscounts Carrington.

His son, the second Baron, sat as a Member of Parliament for Wendover, Buckinghamshire and High Wycombe, and served as Lord Lieutenant of Buckinghamshire. In 1839, the year after the death of his father, he changed his name to Carrington (with double-r) by Royal Licence. In 1880 he owned 25,809 acres (104.45 km^{2}) of land in Buckinghamshire, Lincolnshire and Bedfordshire, giving an annual rental income of £42,254.

His son, the third Baron, was a prominent Liberal politician. He and his brothers changed their name to Carington (with a single r) in 1880. He was created Viscount Wendover, of Chepping Wycombe in the County of Buckingham, and Earl Carrington, in 1895. The following year he changed his name to Wynn-Carington by Royal Licence. He was created Marquess of Lincolnshire in 1912. These three titles were all in the Peerage of the United Kingdom. Under King George V, Lord Lincolnshire held also the Lord Great Chamberlainship, one-quarter of which he had inherited from his mother. His only son and heir, Albert Wynn-Carington, Viscount Wendover, was killed in action in World War I. Consequently, on Lord Lincolnshire's death in 1928, the viscountcy, earldom and marquessate became extinct. His share of the Lord Great Chamberlainship was inherited by his five daughters as co-heiresses (one-twentieth each).

The 1796 and 1797 baronies passed to the Marquess of Lincolnshire's younger brother, the fourth Baron. He had earlier represented Buckinghamshire in Parliament as a Liberal. His grandson the sixth Baron, who succeeded his father in 1938, was a noted Conservative politician who served as Foreign Secretary from 1979 to 1982 and as Secretary General of NATO between 1984 and 1988. In 1999 he was given a life peerage as Baron Carington of Upton (spelled with a single r), of Upton in the County of Nottinghamshire, and thus continued as a member of the House of Lords after the passing of the House of Lords Act 1999 had removed the automatic right of hereditary peers to be members. From the death of Lord Jellicoe in 2007, he was the longest-serving member of the House of Lords, having taken his seat in 1945, and also the oldest member. As of 2018, the baronies are held by his son Rupert Carington, 7th Baron Carrington, who is the current Lord Great Chamberlain since September 2022.

The Hon. Sir William Carington, second son of the second Baron, was a soldier, politician and courtier.

The Barons Carrington are related to the Barons Bicester. The first Baron Carrington's younger brother John Smith was the great-grandfather of Vivian Smith, who was created Baron Bicester in 1938. Also, Abel Smith MP, father of the first Baron Carrington, was the brother of George Smith, who was created a baronet in 1757 (see Bromley baronets), and of John Smith, great-grandfather of the first and last Baron Pauncefote.

The family seat is The Manor House, near Bledlow, Buckinghamshire.

== Baron Carrington, first creation (1643) ==
- see the Viscount Carrington

== Baron Carrington, second and third creations ==
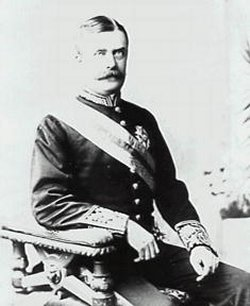
The 1st Marquess of Lincolnshire

=== Baron Carrington (1796 I, 1797 GB) ===
- Robert Smith, 1st Baron Carrington (1752–1838)
- Robert John Carrington, 2nd Baron Carrington (1796–1868)
- Charles Robert Wynn-Carington, 3rd Baron Carrington (1843–1928) (created Earl Carrington in 1895)

=== Earl Carrington (1895) ===
- Charles Wynn-Carington, 1st Marquess of Lincolnshire|Charles Robert Wynn-Carington, 1st Earl Carrington (1843–1928) (created Marquess of Lincolnshire in 1912)

=== Marquess of Lincolnshire (1912) ===
- Charles Robert Wynn-Carington, 1st Marquess of Lincolnshire (1843–1928)
  - Albert Edward Charles Robert Wynn-Carington, Viscount Wendover (1895–1915)

=== Baron Carrington (1796, 1797; reverted) ===
- Rupert Clement George Carington, 4th Baron Carrington (1852–1929)
- Rupert Victor John Carington, 5th Baron Carrington (1891–1938)
- Peter Alexander Rupert Carington, 6th Baron Carrington (1919–2018)
- Rupert Francis John Carington, 7th Baron Carrington (b. 1948)

The heir apparent is the present holder's only son, the Hon. Robert Peter Flavio Carington (b. 1990).
The heir apparent's heir-in-line is his son, Alexander Rupert Victor Carington (b. 2022).

=== Title succession chart ===
Title succession chart, Barons Carrington.

Robert Smith; 1st Baron Carrington; 1752–1838
Robert Carrington; 2nd Baron Carrington; 1796–1868
Viscount Wendover; Earl Carrington; Marquess of Lincolnshire
Charles Wynn-Carington; 3rd Baron Carrington; 1st Earl Carrington; 1st Marquess of Lincolnshire; 1843–1928 | Sir William Carington; 1845–1914 | Rupert Carington; 4th Baron Carrington; 1852–1929
Viscountcy, earldom and marquessate extinct
Albert Wynn-Carington; Viscount Wendover; 1895–1915 | Rupert Carington; 5th Baron Carrington; 1891–1938
Peter Carington; 6th Baron Carrington; 1919–2018
Rupert Carington; 7th Baron Carrington born 1948
Hon. Robert Carington born 1990
Alexander Carington born 2022

=== Arms ===
Coat of arms of Baron Carrington
| Notes 6th Baron Carrington since 1938 Coronet A coronet of a Baron Crest An elephant's head, crased, Or, eared Gules, charged on the neck with three fleurs-de-lis, two and one, Azure. Torse Mantling Or and Sable. Escutcheon Or a chevron cotised, between three demi-griffins couped those in chief respectant Sable. Supporters On either side a griffin Sable, winged, beaked, and membered Or, the dexter charged on the body with three Fleur-de-lis and the sinister with three trefoils Or. Motto TENAX ET FIDELIS; Latin: Tenacious and faithful Orders The Order of the Garter circlet (for 6th Baron Carrington). |

== See also ==
- Baron Bicester
- Viscount Carrington
