= Arnold Keppel, 8th Earl of Albemarle =

British military officer, courtier and politician (1858–1942)

Brigadier-General The Earl of Albemarle GCVO CB VD TD JP
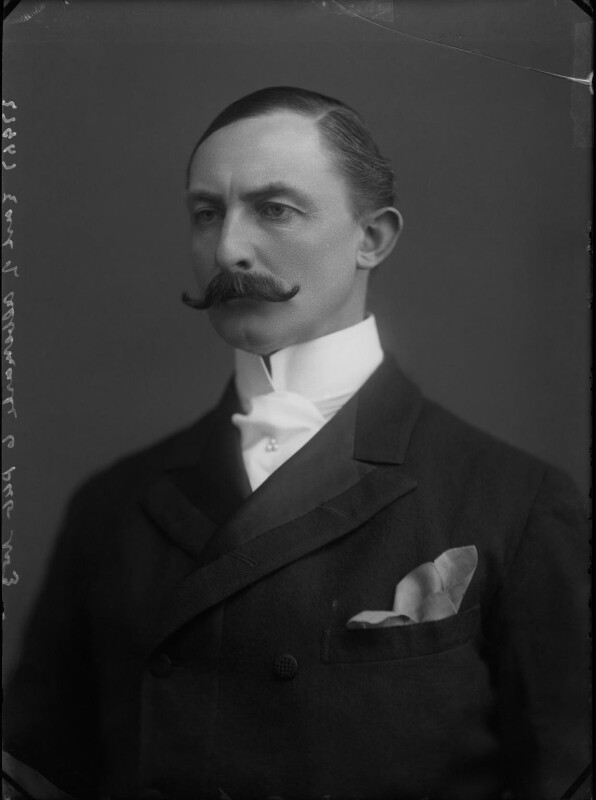
- Albemarle, c. 1897
- Born: Arnold Allan Cecil Keppel; 1 June 1858
- Died: 12 April 1942 (aged 83); Quidenham, Norfolk
- Other name: Viscount Bury
- Education: Eton College
- Spouse: Lady Gertrude Lucia Egerton (m. 1881)
- Children: 5
- Father: William Keppel, 7th Earl of Albemarle
- Military career
- Allegiance: United Kingdom
- Branch: British Army
- Service years: 1878–1883; 1892–1906
- Rank: Brigadier-General
- Units: Dorset Militia; Scots Guards; 12th Middlesex (Civil Service) Rifle Volunteer Corps
- Conflicts: Second Boer War

Arnold Allan Cecil Keppel, 8th Earl of Albemarle, GCVO, CB, VD, TD, JP (1 June 1858 – 12 April 1942), styled Viscount Bury from 1891 to 1894, was a British military officer, courtier and Conservative politician.

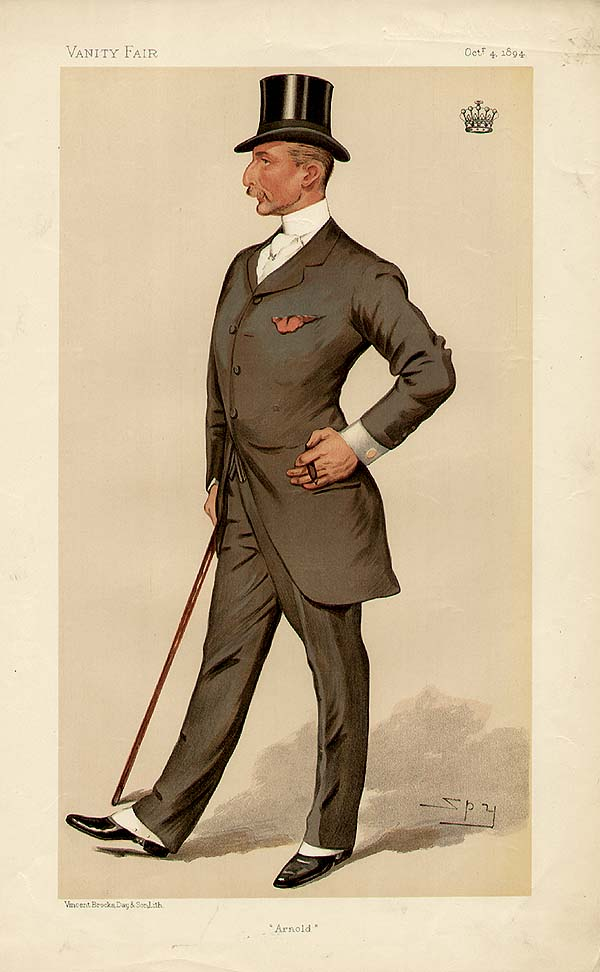
"Arnold" The Earl of Albemarle as caricatured by Spy (Leslie Ward) in Vanity Fair, October 1894

== Life and political career ==
Lord Albemarle was the eldest son of William Keppel, 7th Earl of Albemarle, and his beloved wife Sophia Mary, daughter of Sir Allan Napier McNab, 1st Baronet, a Canadian politician, and was educated at Eton College. In 1892 he was returned to Parliament for Birkenhead, a seat he held until 1894 when he succeeded his father in the earldom and took his seat in the House of Lords. Lord Albemarle served in the Conservative administrations of Bonar Law and Stanley Baldwin as a Lord-in-waiting (government whip in the House of Lords) between 1922 and 1924.

He was elected as a Fellow of the Zoological Society of London (FZS) in July 1902.

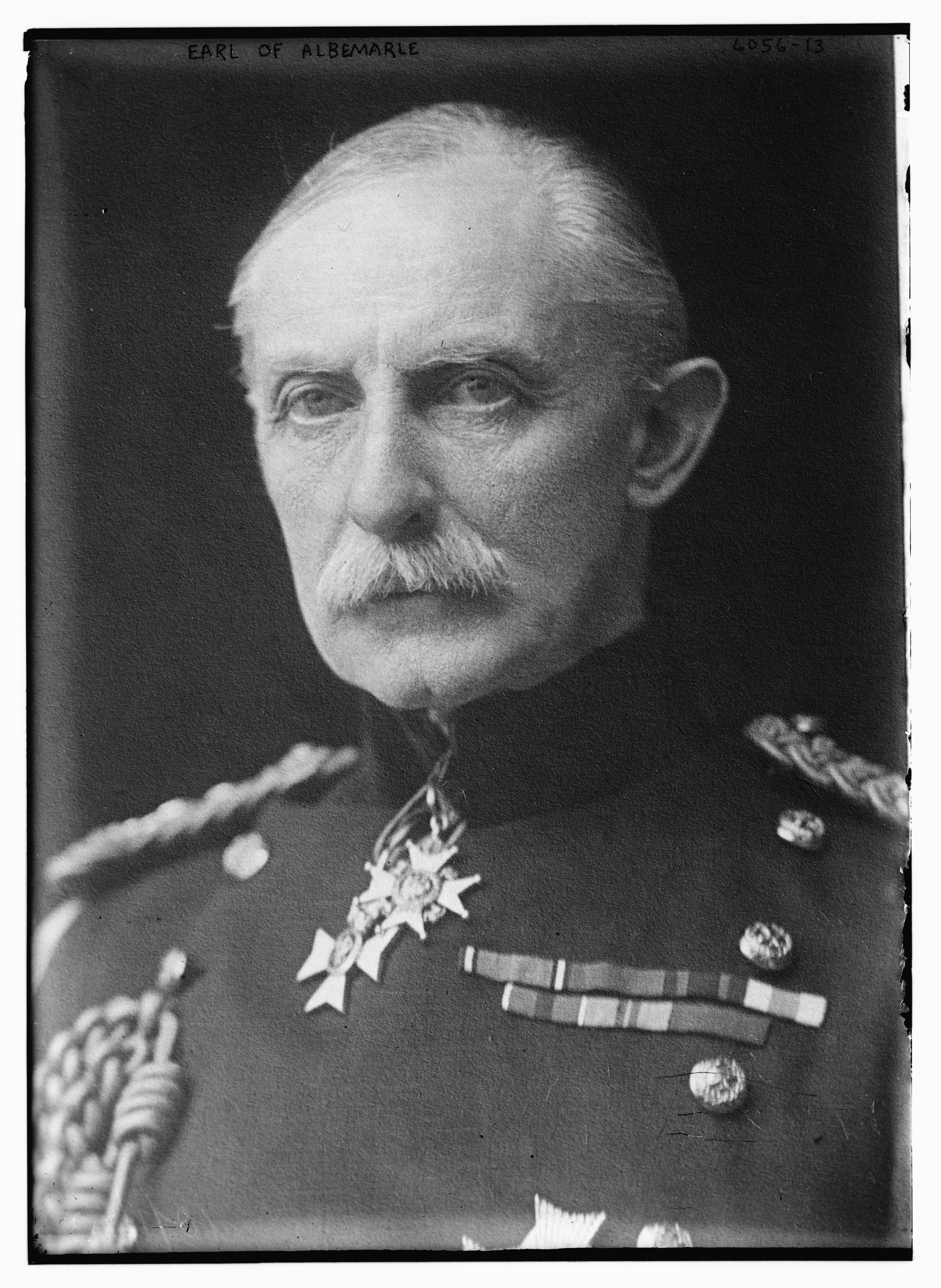
The Earl in uniform, ca 1900.

== Military career ==
He was commissioned as a Sub-lieutenant in the part-time Dorset Militia in 1877 and the following year transferred to the Scots Guards as a Second lieutenant. He resigned his commission in 1883. In 1892 he took over his father's position as Lieutenant-Colonel of the 12th Middlesex (Civil Service) Rifle Volunteer Corps, retaining the command until 1901.

After the outbreak of the Second Boer War in October 1899, a corps of imperial volunteers from the London was formed in the late December 1899. The corps included infantry, mounted infantry, and artillery divisions and was authorized with the name City of London Imperial Volunteers (CIV). It proceeded to South Africa in January 1900, returned in October of the same year, and was disbanded in the December 1900. Lord Albemarle was appointed in charge of the infantry division of the CIV on 3 January 1900, with the temporary rank of lieutenant-colonel in the Army, and served as such until the corps was disbanded. He was mentioned in despatches, received the Queen's South Africa Medal with four clasps, and was in 1900 appointed a Companion of the Order of the Bath (CB) for his services in South Africa. He received the honorary rank of Lt-Col in the Army.

Albemarle was appointed as the Honorary Colonel of the 4th (2nd Norfolk Militia) Battalion, Norfolk Regiment in 1900 and of the 2nd Volunteer Battalion of the regiment (later 5th Bn Norfolks in the Territorial Force) in 1906. He commanded the Norfolk Volunteer Infantry Brigade with the rank of Brigadier-General from 1901 to 1906. He was awarded both the Volunteer Decoration (VD) and the Territorial Decoration (TD)

He was an Aide-de-Camp to both Edward VII and George V, and was appointed a Member of the Royal Victorian Order (MVO) in July 1901, advanced to a Knight Commander (KCVO) of the same Order in 1909, and promoted to the Grand Cross (GCVO) of the order in 1931.

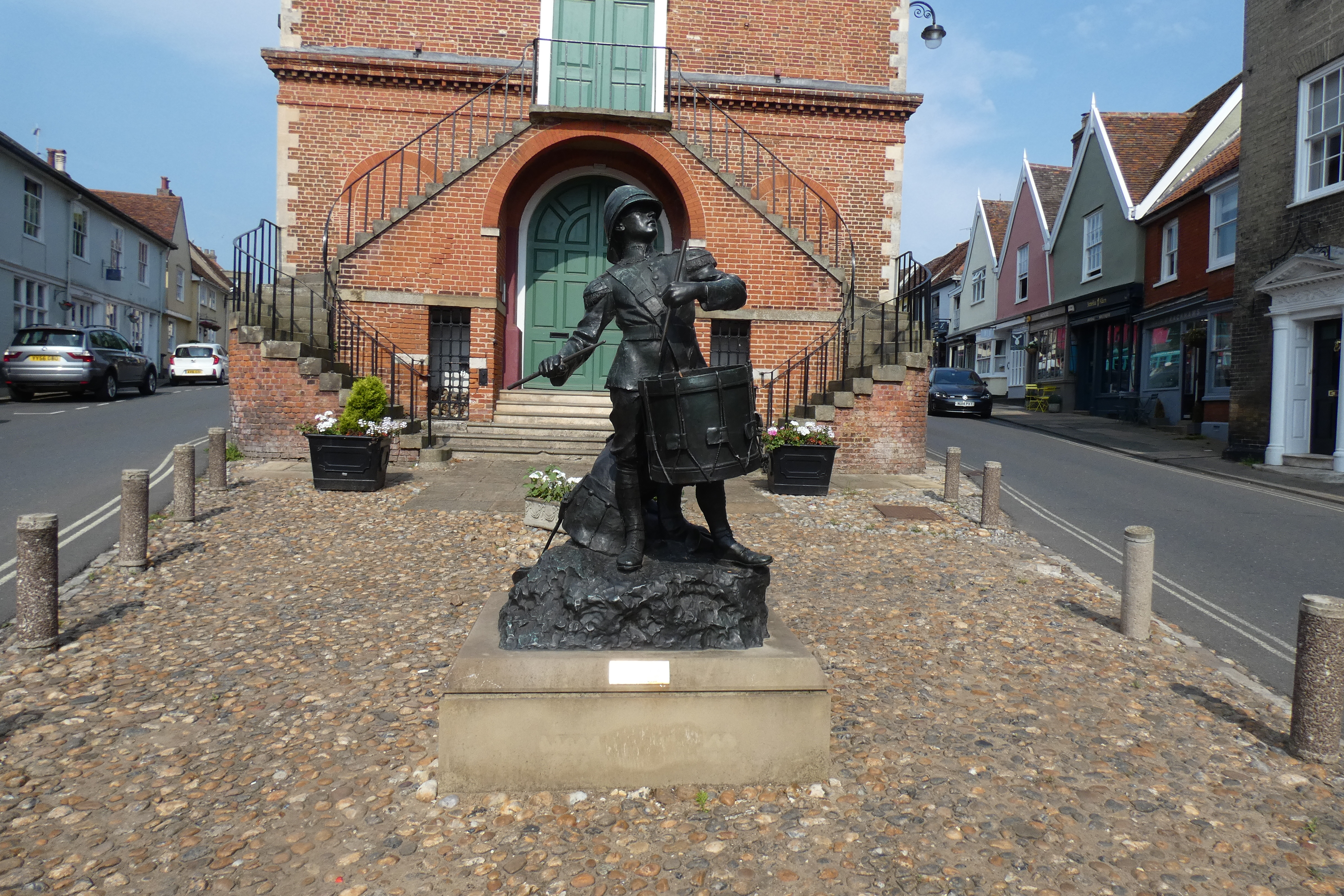
Statue Drums of the Fore and Aft at Woodbridge, Suffolk, attributed to the Earl.

He is credited with sculpting the statue of the two drummer boys from Rudyard Kipling's story The Drums of the Fore and Aft that now stands in Woodbridge, Suffolk.

== Family ==
Lord Albemarle married Lady Gertrude Lucia Egerton (1861–1943), daughter of Wilbraham Egerton, 1st Earl Egerton, in 1881. They had four sons and one daughter:

- Walter Egerton George Lucian (1882–1979); married firstly in 1909 Lady Judith Sydney Myee Wynn-Carington (1889–1928), daughter of the 1st and last Marquess of Lincolnshire; they had five children. He married secondly in 1931 Diana Cicely Grove (1909–2013); they had one daughter.
- Arnold Joost William (1884–1964); married firstly, in 1921, Doris Lilian Carter, they divorced in 1938. He married secondly, in 1938, Annie Margaret Blanche Purnell. He married thirdly, in 1952, Mildred Rodber. He had no children from any of his marriages.
- Rupert Oswald Derek (1886–1964); married in 1919 (annulled in 1921) Violet Mary de Trafford, without issue.
- Elizabeth Mary Gertrude Lucia Sophia (1890–1986); married Sir Torquhil Matheson, 5th Baronet, and they had two sons.
- Albert Edward George Arnold (1898–1917); killed in action in the Battle of Passchendaele near Ypres, Belgium. He died unmarried.

Albemarle died in Quidenham, Norfolk, on 12 April 1942, aged 83, and was succeeded in the earldom by his eldest son, Walter.

== Arms ==
Coat of arms of Arnold Keppel, 8th Earl of Albemarle
Coronet Coronet of an Earl. Crest Out of a ducal coronet or, a swan's head and neck argent. Escutcheon Gules, three escallops argent. Supporters Two lions ducally crowned or. Motto Ne cede malis (Yield not to adversity) Orders The Royal Victorian Order - Knight Grand Cross (GCVO).

== Notes ==
Parliament of the United Kingdom
Preceded by Edward Bruce Hamley	Member of Parliament for Birkenhead; 1892–1894	Succeeded by Elliott Lees
Peerage of England
Preceded by William Keppel	Earl of Albemarle; 1894–1942	Succeeded by Walter Keppel
