= Peter Carington, 6th Baron Carrington =

British politician (1919–2018)

Major The Right Honourable The Lord Carrington KG GCMG CH MC PC DL
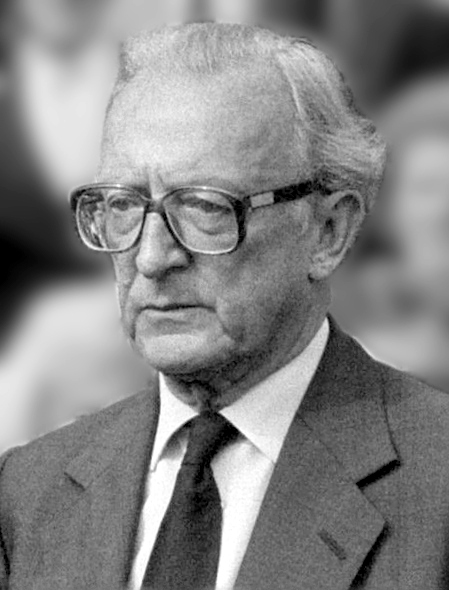
- Carrington in 1984

6th Secretary General of NATO
- In office 25 June 1984 – 1 July 1988
- Preceded by: Joseph Luns
- Succeeded by: Manfred Wörner

Secretary of State for Foreign and Commonwealth Affairs
- In office 4 May 1979 – 5 April 1982
- Prime Minister: Margaret Thatcher
- Preceded by: David Owen
- Succeeded by: Francis Pym
Other ministerial offices
Leader of the Opposition in the Lords Shadow Leader of the House of Lords
In office 4 March 1974 – 4 May 1979
Leader	Edward Heath; Margaret Thatcher
Preceded by	The Lord Shackleton
Succeeded by	The Lord Peart
In office 16 October 1964 – 20 June 1970
Leader	Alec Douglas-Home; Edward Heath
Preceded by	The Earl Alexander of Hillsborough
Succeeded by	The Lord Shackleton
Secretary of State for Energy
In office 8 January 1974 – 4 March 1974
Prime Minister	Edward Heath
Preceded by	Office established
Succeeded by	Eric Varley
Chairman of the Conservative Party
In office 7 April 1972 – 4 March 1974
Leader	Edward Heath
Preceded by	Peter Thomas
Succeeded by	William Whitelaw
Secretary of State for Defence
In office 20 June 1970 – 8 January 1974
Prime Minister	Edward Heath
Preceded by	Denis Healey
Succeeded by	Ian Gilmour
Leader of the House of Lords; Minister without Portfolio
In office 20 October 1963 – 16 October 1964
Prime Minister	Alec Douglas-Home
Preceded by	The Viscount Hailsham; Bill Deedes
Succeeded by	The Earl of Longford; George Thomson
First Lord of the Admiralty
In office 14 October 1959 – 20 October 1963
Prime Minister	Harold Macmillan
Preceded by	The Earl of Selkirk
Succeeded by	The Earl Jellicoe
High Commissioner to Australia
In office 26 May 1956 – 14 October 1959
Prime Minister	Sir Anthony Eden; Harold Macmillan
Preceded by	Stephen Holmes
Succeeded by	Sir William Oliver
Parliamentary Secretary to the Ministry of Defence
In office 18 October 1954 – 26 May 1956
Prime Minister	Sir Winston Churchill; Sir Anthony Eden
Preceded by	Nigel Birch
Succeeded by	The Earl of Gosford
Parliamentary Secretary to the Ministry of Agriculture and Food
In office 5 November 1951 – 18 October 1954 Serving with Richard Nugent
Prime Minister	Sir Winston Churchill
Preceded by	The Earl of Listowel; Arthur Champion
Succeeded by	Richard Nugent; The Earl St Aldwyn

Member of the House of Lords
- Lord Temporal
- Hereditary peerage 19 November 1938 – 11 November 1999
- Preceded by: The 5th Baron Carrington
- Succeeded by: Seat abolished
- Life peerage 17 November 1999 – 9 July 2018

Personal details
- Born: Peter Alexander Rupert Carington; 6 June 1919 Chelsea, London, England
- Died: 9 July 2018 (aged 99) Bledlow, England
- Party: Conservative
- Spouse: Iona McClean (m. 1942; died 2009)
- Children: 3, including Rupert
- Parents: Rupert Carington, 5th Baron Carrington (father); Hon. Sybil Marion Colville (mother)
- Education: Royal Military College, Sandhurst

Military service
- Allegiance: United Kingdom
- Branch/service: British Army
- Years of service: 1939–1949 (inactive from 1945)
- Rank: Major
- Unit: Grenadier Guards
- Battles/wars: Second World War
- Awards: Military Cross
- Service No.: 85592

Peter Alexander Rupert Carington, 6th Baron Carrington, Baron Carington of Upton (6 June 1919 – 9 July 2018) was a British Conservative Party politician and hereditary peer who served as Defence Secretary from 1970 to 1974, Foreign Secretary from 1979 to 1982, chairman of the General Electric Company from 1983 to 1984, and Secretary General of NATO from 1984 to 1988. In Margaret Thatcher's first government, he played a major role in negotiating the Lancaster House Agreement that ended the conflict in Rhodesia and enabled the creation of Zimbabwe. Carington later served as the Chairman of the Steering Committee for the Bilderberg Group's meetings from 1990 to 1998.

Carington was Foreign Secretary in 1982 when Argentina invaded the Falkland Islands. He took full responsibility for the failure to foresee this and resigned. As NATO secretary general, he helped prevent a war between Greece and Turkey during the 1987 Aegean Crisis.

Following the House of Lords Act 1999, which removed the automatic right of hereditary peers to sit in the House of Lords, Carington was created a life peer as Baron Carington of Upton.

== Background and early life ==
The surname "Carrington" (with two Rs) was adopted by royal licence dated 1839 by his direct male ancestor Robert Carrington, 2nd Baron Carrington, in lieu of Smith. The latter's father, Robert Smith, MP for Nottingham, was created Baron Carrington in 1796 (Peerage of Ireland) and 1797 (Peerage of Great Britain). The spelling of the surname was changed by royal licence to "Carington" (with one r) in 1880 by the 2nd Baron's sons, but the spelling of the title did not change.

Born in Chelsea on 6 June 1919, Peter Alexander Rupert Carington was the only son of the 5th Baron Carrington by his wife, the Hon. Sybil Marion Colville, a daughter of Charles Colville, 2nd Viscount Colville of Culross. His great-uncles were the Liberal statesman Charles Wynn-Carington, 1st Marquess of Lincolnshire, and politician and courtier the Hon. Sir William Carington. Carington grew up in Millaton House, in Bridestowe, Devon. He went to Sandroyd School from 1928 to 1932, based at that time in Cobham, Surrey, and Eton College. On leaving Eton, his housemaster, Cyril Butterwick, said of Carington, "For a really stupid boy, there are three possible professions: farming, soldiering and stockbroking".

After training at the Royal Military College, Sandhurst, Carington was commissioned into the Grenadier Guards as a second lieutenant on 26 January 1939.

== Military service ==
Carington saw active service with his regiment during the Second World War. He was promoted to lieutenant on 1 January 1941, then to temporary captain and to acting major. He was a tank commander during Operation Market Garden in the Netherlands in 1944. He led the first group of four Sherman tanks to cross the Nijmegen road bridge across the Waal River and was awarded the Military Cross (MC) on 1 March 1945 "in recognition of gallant and distinguished services in North West Europe". After the war, Carington remained in the army until 1949.

== Political career 1946–1982 ==
In 1938, Carington succeeded his father as 6th Baron Carrington. Although he had the right to take his seat in the House of Lords on his 21st birthday in 1940, since he was on active service he did not do so until 9 October 1945. After leaving the Army, Carington took an active part in the House of Lords and from November 1951 to October 1954 served in the Conservative governments of Winston Churchill and Anthony Eden as Parliamentary secretary to the Minister of Agriculture and Food. He was also appointed as a deputy lieutenant of Buckinghamshire on 2 July 1951. During the Crichel Down affair, which led to the resignation of minister Thomas Dugdale, Carington tendered his resignation, which was refused by the Prime Minister. Carington was Parliamentary Secretary to the Minister of Defence from October 1954 to October 1956, and was then appointed High Commissioner to Australia, a post he held until October 1959. He became a Privy Counsellor in 1959.

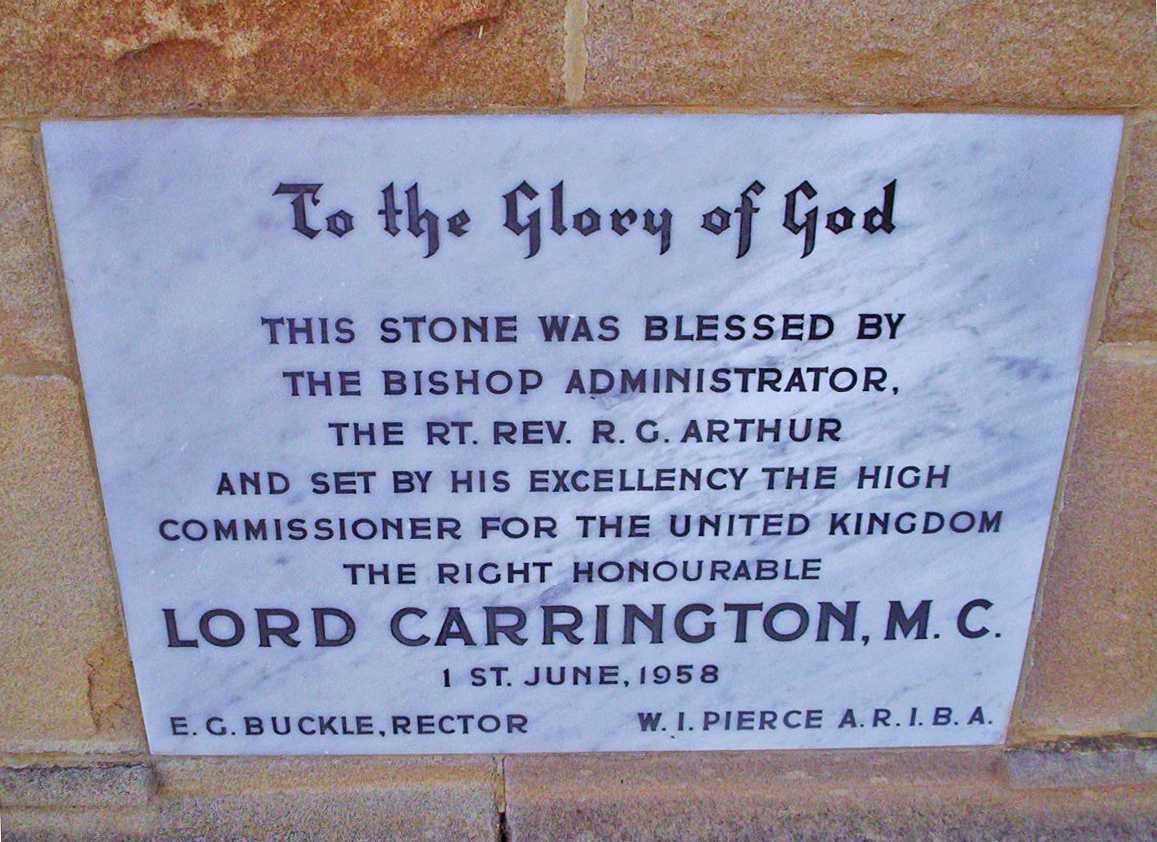
Stone set by Lord Carrington, while High Commissioner to Australia, at All Saints Church, Canberra

Following his return to Britain he served under Harold Macmillan as First Lord of the Admiralty until October 1963. In this role, Carington worked with Lord Mountbatten, who was Chief of the Defence Staff, during a time of major restructuring and reform of the Admiralty. After Alec Douglas-Home became prime minister in October 1963, Carington held the posts of minister without portfolio and Leader of the House of Lords until October 1964, when the general election led to a change of government. From 1964 to 1970 he was Leader of the Opposition in the House of Lords.

When the Conservatives returned to power in 1970 under Edward Heath, Carington became Defence Secretary, where he remained until the February 1974 general election. In a 1977 letter discussing the policy of torture of Irish republican internees during Operation Demetrius in August 1971, the then Home Secretary Merlyn Rees attributed the origins of the policy to Carington: '"It is my view (confirmed by Brian Faulkner before his death [NI's prime minister at the time]) that the decision to use methods of torture in Northern Ireland in 1971/72 was taken by ministers – in particular Lord Carrington, then secretary of state for defence."

Carington became shadow defence secretary in 1968 after Enoch Powell was dismissed, following his controversial Rivers of Blood speech on immigration. He also served as Chairman of the Conservative Party from 1972 to 1974, and was briefly Secretary of State for Energy from January to March 1974.

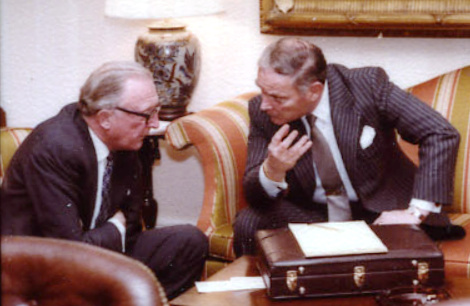
Carington (then Foreign Secretary) and US Secretary of State Alexander Haig meet in 1981 during a visit by Margaret Thatcher to the US.

Carington was again leader of the opposition in the House of Lords from 1974 to 1979. In 1979 he was made Foreign Secretary and Minister for Overseas Development in the first cabinet of Margaret Thatcher. Thatcher spoke highly of Carington, stating that "Peter had great panache and the ability to identify immediately the main points in any argument; and he could express himself in pungent terms. We had disagreements, but there were never any hard feelings."

Carington chaired the Lancaster House conference in 1979, attended by Ian Smith, Abel Muzorewa, Robert Mugabe, Joshua Nkomo and Josiah Tongogara, which brought to an end Rhodesia's Bush War. He later expressed his support for Mugabe over Smith. In his memoir, The Great Betrayal: The Memoirs of Ian Douglas Smith, Ian Smith described Carington as the most dishonest and manipulative politician he had ever met.

Carington was primarily responsible for ensuring the 1982 Canada Act passed the House of Lords. Under the provisions of the act, which received Royal Assent on 29 March 1982, the British Parliament renounced any future role in amending the Canadian constitution, a process known in the former dominion as patriation.

Carington was foreign secretary when Argentina invaded the Falkland Islands on 2 April 1982. He resigned his position on 5 April, taking full responsibility for the complacency of the Foreign and Commonwealth Office in its failure to foresee this development and for the misleading signals sent by the Foreign Office on British intentions for retaining control over the Falklands. In her autobiography, Margaret Thatcher later expressed her sorrow at his departure. She had asked him to stay but he left because he and the Foreign Office were distrusted and even hated by many back-bench Conservatives.

Lord Carrington was the final hereditary peer to hold one of the four Great Offices of State.

== Later life and death ==
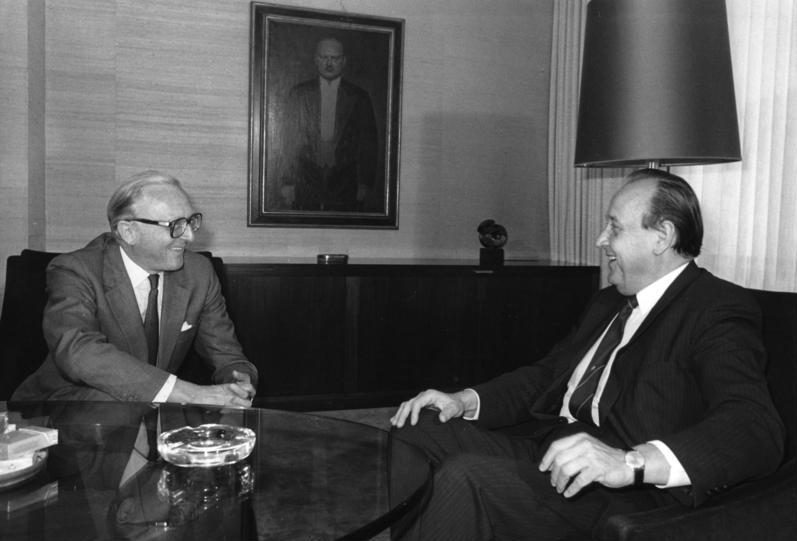
Carrington (then NATO Secretary General) with West German Foreign Minister Genscher in Bonn, 1984

Carington served as Secretary General of NATO from 1984 to 1988. He was chairman of the Victoria and Albert Museum from 1983 to 1988. He was appointed Chancellor of the Order of St Michael and St George on 1 August 1984, serving until June 1994.

In 1991, he presided over diplomatic talks about the breakup of Yugoslavia and attempted to pass a plan to end the wars and result in each republic becoming an independent nation.

Aside from his political posts, Carington was chancellor of the University of Reading and served as chairman of several companies, including Christie's, and as a director of many others, including Barclays Bank, Cadbury Schweppes and The Daily Telegraph. He also chaired the Bilderberg conferences from 1990 to 1998, being succeeded in 1999 by Étienne Davignon. From 1983 to 2002, he was president of the Pilgrims Society, and from 1971 to 2018 president of the Britain–Australia Society. He was appointed Chancellor of the Order of the Garter on 8 November 1994, a role from which he retired in October 2012.

After the House of Lords Act 1999 removed the automatic right of hereditary peers to sit in the House of Lords, Carington, along with all former leaders of the House of Lords, was given a life peerage on 17 November 1999. He took this as Baron Carington of Upton, of Upton in the County of Nottinghamshire. He was the longest-serving member of the House of Lords, and following the retirement of Lord Barber of Tewkesbury in 2016, had been the oldest. He was the second longest-serving member of the Privy Council after the Duke of Edinburgh.

Carington died from pneumonia on 9 July 2018, aged 99, at his home, the Manor House, in Bledlow, Buckinghamshire. His son Rupert succeeded him as Baron Carrington and in 2022 on the accession of Charles III became Lord Great Chamberlain of England.

A memorial service for Carrington was held at Westminster Abbey on 31 January 2019.

== Family ==
Carington married Iona McClean (19 March 1920 – 7 June 2009), daughter of Francis McClean and Aileen Wale, on 25 April 1942. They had three children, including Rupert Carington, 7th Baron Carrington. Carington's wife died in 2009 aged 89.

== In popular culture ==
Carington was a guest on BBC Radio 4's long-running programme Desert Island Discs in 1975 and on the same station's A Good Read in 2004.

In the 1977 war film A Bridge Too Far, John Stride played a Grenadier Guards captain at Nijmegen Bridge based on Carington. This portrayal depicted the fictitious argument between Carington and Major Julian Cook on whether to move forward along the "Hell's Highway" route.

In February 1982 Carington was portrayed by Rowan Atkinson in a Not the Nine O'Clock News parody of Question Time, pedantically discussing an imminent nuclear holocaust.

Carington was portrayed by James Fox in the 2002 BBC production of Ian Curteis's The Falklands Play. He was also briefly portrayed by James Smith in the 2011 film The Iron Lady, and by Jeff Rawle in the 2014 play Handbagged.

== Honours ==
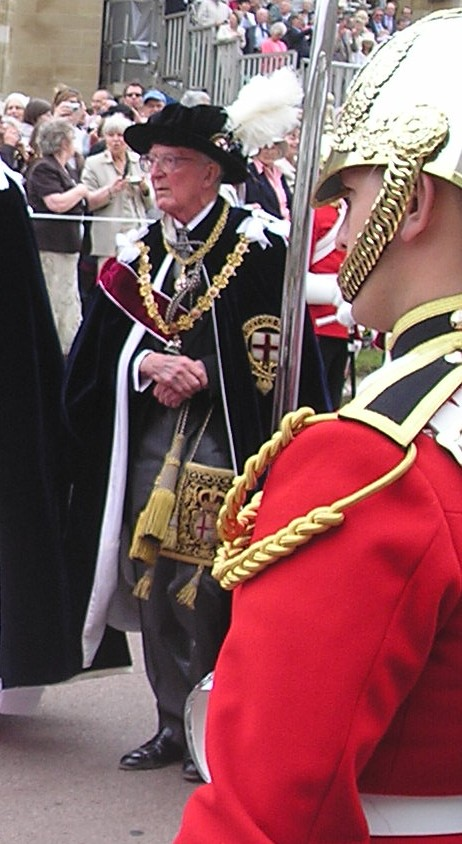
Lord Carrington, as Chancellor of the Order of the Garter, in procession to St George's Chapel in 2006

- 1945: Military Cross
- 1958: Knight Commander of the Most Distinguished Order of Saint Michael and Saint George (KCMG)
- 1959: Lord of Her Majesty's Most Honourable Privy Council
- 1983: Member of the Order of the Companions of Honour (CH)
- 1985: Knight Companion of the Most Noble Order of the Garter (KG); Chancellor of the Order (1994–2012)
- 1988: Knight Grand Cross of the Most Distinguished Order of Saint Michael and Saint George (GCMG); Chancellor of the Order (1984–1994)
- 1999: Life peerage, as Baron Carington of Upton
- Knight Grand Cross of the Royal and Distinguished Spanish Order of Charles III
- 1988: Presidential Medal of Freedom
- Department of Defense Medal for Distinguished Public Service
- Freedom of the City of London

=== Honorary degrees ===
- 1981: University of Cambridge (LLD)
- 1983: University of Essex (DUniv)
- December 1989: University of Reading (DLitt)
- 1986: Harvard University (LLD)
- 1993: University of Nottingham (LLD)
- 14 December 1998: University of Newcastle upon Tyne (DCL)
- 21 November 2003: University of Oxford (DCL)

=== Arms ===
Coat of arms of Peter Carington, 6th Baron Carrington
Notes 6th Baron Carrington since 1938 Coronet A coronet of a Baron Crest An elephant's head erased or eared gules charged on the neck with three fleurs-de-lis, two and one azure. Torse Mantling: Or and sable. Escutcheon Or, a chevron cotised between three demi-griffins couped those in chief respectant sable. Supporters Two griffins wings elevated sable, the dexter charged on the body with three fleurs-de-lis palewise or and the sinister with three trefoils slipped palewise of the last. Motto TENAX ET FIDELIS; Latin: Tenacious and faithful Orders The Order of the Garter circlet. Banner The banner of the Baron Carrington's arms as Knight Companion of the Garter

== Bibliography ==
- Reflect on Things Past – The Memoirs of Lord Carrington. Published by William Collins, 1988.

Political offices
Preceded by The Earl of Listowel; Arthur Champion	Parliamentary Secretary to the Board of Agriculture and Fisheries; 1951–1954; Served alongside: Richard Nugent	Succeeded by Richard Nugent; The Earl St Aldwyn
Preceded by Nigel Birch	Parliamentary Secretary to the Minister of Defence; 1954–1956	Succeeded by The Earl of Gosford
Preceded by The Earl of Selkirk	First Lord of the Admiralty; 1959–1963	Succeeded by The Earl Jellicoe
Preceded by Bill Deedes	Minister without Portfolio; 1963–1964	Succeeded by George Thomson
Preceded by The Viscount Hailsham	Leader of the House of Lords; 1963–1964	Succeeded by The Earl of Longford
Preceded by Denis Healey	Secretary of State for Defence; 1970–1974	Succeeded by Ian Gilmour
New office	Secretary of State for Energy; 1974	Succeeded by Eric Varley
Preceded by David Owen	Foreign Secretary; 1979–1982	Succeeded by Francis Pym
Diplomatic posts
Preceded by Sir Stephen Holmes	High Commissioner to Australia; 1956–1959	Succeeded by Sir William Oliver
Preceded by Joseph Luns	Secretary General of NATO; 1984–1988	Succeeded by Manfred Wörner
Party political offices
Preceded by The Viscount Hailsham	Leader of the Conservative Party in the House of Lords; 1963–1970	Succeeded by The Earl Jellicoe
Preceded by Peter Thomas	Chairman of the Conservative Party; 1972–1974	Succeeded by William Whitelaw
Preceded by The Lord Windlesham	Leader of the Conservative Party in the House of Lords; 1974–1979	Succeeded by The Lord Soames
Business positions
Preceded by Sir Geoffrey Gibbs	Chairman of the Australia and New Zealand Bank Ltd; 1967–1969	Merged into ANZ Banking Group
New title	Chairman of ANZ Banking Group; 1969–1970	Succeeded by Sir Alexander Ross
Academic offices
Preceded by The Lord Sherfield	Chancellor of the University of Reading; 1992–2007	Succeeded by John Madejski
Honorary titles
Preceded by The Marquess of Abergavenny	Chancellor of the Order of the Garter; 1994–2012	Succeeded by The Duke of Abercorn
Preceded by The Earl Jellicoe	Longest-serving member in the House of Lords; 2007–2018	Succeeded by The Lord Denham
Peerage of Ireland
Preceded by Rupert Carington	Baron Carrington; 2nd creation 1938–2018	Succeeded by Rupert Carington
Peerage of Great Britain
Preceded by Rupert Carington	Baron Carrington; 3rd creation 1938–2018; Member of the House of Lords (1940–1999)	Succeeded by Rupert Carington
