= Earl of Albemarle =

Title in the Peerage of England

Earldom of Albemarle
- Arms of the Earls of Albemarle Blazon Escutcheon: Gules, three escallops argent. Crest: Out of a ducal coronet or, a swan's head and neck argent. Supporters: Two lions ducally crowned or. Motto: Ne cede malis (Yield not to adversity)
- Creation date: 10 February 1697
- Created by: William III
- Peerage: Peerage of England
- First holder: Arnold Joost van Keppel
- Present holder: Rufus Keppel, 10th Earl of Albemarle
- Heir apparent: Augustus Keppel, Viscount Bury
- Remainder to: the 1st Earl's heirs male of the body lawfully begotten.
- Subsidiary titles: Viscount Bury; Baron Ashford
- Former seat: Elveden Hall

Earl of Albemarle is a title created several times from Norman times onwards. The word Albemarle is derived from the Latinised form of the French county of Aumale in Normandy (Latin: Alba Marla meaning "White Marl", marl being a type of fertile soil), other forms being Aubemarle and Aumerle. It is described in the patent of nobility granted in 1697 by William III to Arnold Joost van Keppel as "a town and territory in the Dukedom of Normandy."

The family seat is Hurst Barns Farm, near East Chiltington, East Sussex.

== Early creations ==
Aumale was raised by William the Conqueror into a county for his half-sister, Adelaide, and in England translated to an earldom for her husband and their descendants. The earldom became extinct with the death of Aveline, daughter of the 4th earl, in 1274. The title was twice raised to a dukedom, in 1385 and in 1397, before being recreated as an earldom in 1412 for Thomas, 2nd son of Henry IV.

In 1660 the title, anglicized as Albemarle, was revived in the peerage by King Charles II for General George Monck, who became Duke of Albemarle. The title became extinct in 1688, on the death of Christopher, 2nd Duke of Albemarle.

=== Early counts, earls and dukes of Aumale ===
See Counts and dukes of Aumale

== 1697 creation ==
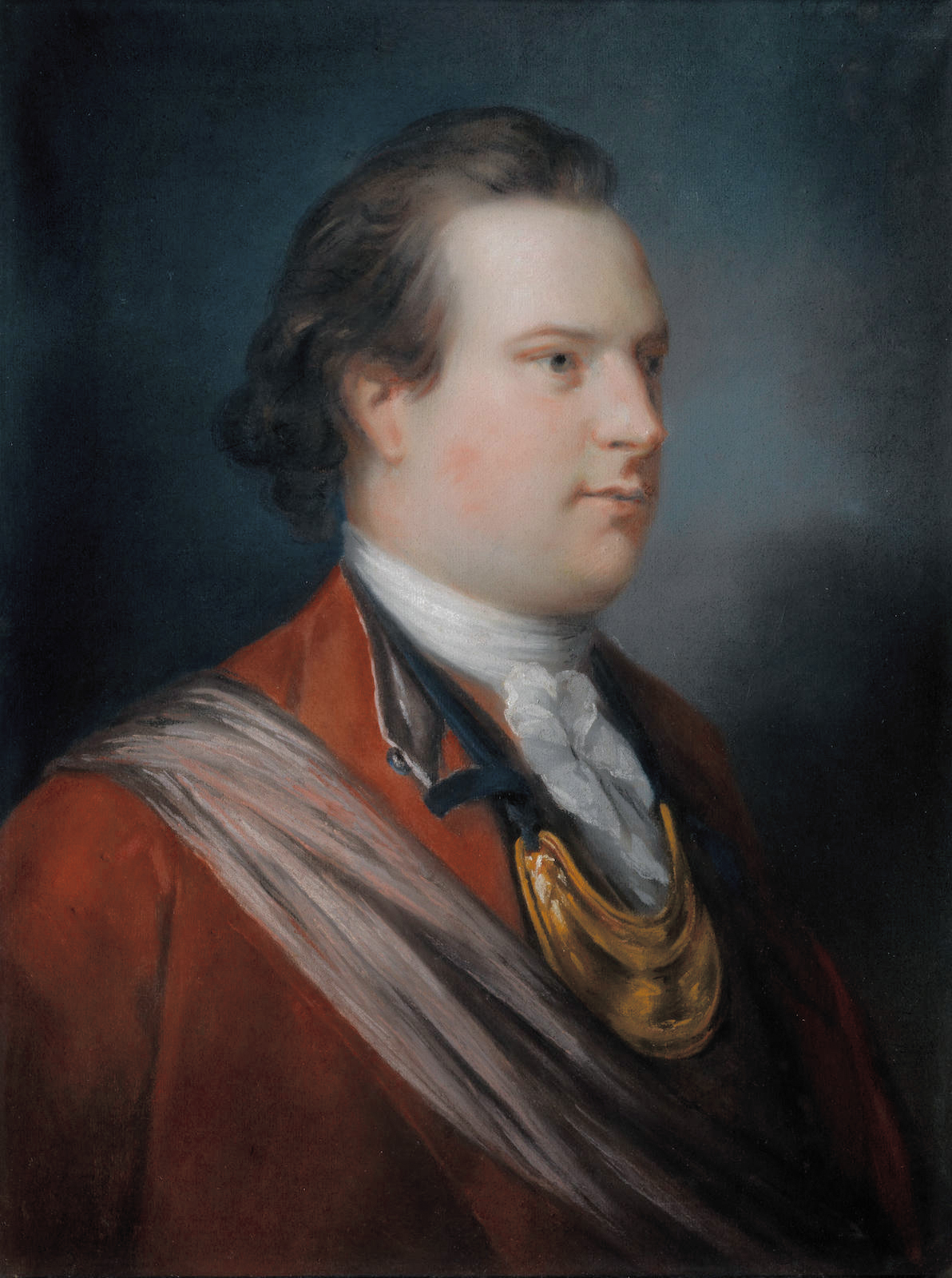
George Keppel, 3rd Earl of Albemarle

In 1697, King William III created his Dutch favourite Arnold Joost van Keppel Earl of Albemarle in the Peerage of England. He was made Baron Ashford, of Ashford in the County of Kent, and Viscount Bury, in the County of Lancaster, at the same time. The motive for choosing this title was probably that, apart from its traditions, it avoided the difficulty created by the fact that the Keppels had as yet no territorial possessions in the British Islands. Lord Albemarle was succeeded by his only son, the second Earl. He was a general in the army and also served as titular Governor of Virginia and as Ambassador to France. Albemarle County in Virginia is named in his honour, even though he never set foot in North America (but, instead, saw plenty of "North Britain" after the Battle of Culloden in 1746). He married Lady Anne Lennox, daughter of Charles Lennox, 1st Duke of Richmond, illegitimate son of King Charles II.

His eldest son, the third Earl, was also a successful military commander, best known as the commander-in-chief of the invasion and occupation of Havana and west Cuba in 1762. He was succeeded by his son, the fourth Earl. He served as Master of the Buckhounds and as Master of the Horse. His second but eldest surviving son, the fifth Earl, was also a soldier and fought at the Battle of Waterloo at an early age. He later represented Arundel in the House of Commons. He was childless and was succeeded by his younger brother, the sixth Earl who lived on his estate at Drumsna in County Leitrim, Ireland, for much of his life. He also fought at Waterloo in early life and was later promoted to general. Albemarle also sat as Member of Parliament for East Norfolk and Lymington.

His only son, the seventh Earl, was a soldier and politician. At first a Liberal, he held minor office under Lord Palmerston and Lord Russell from 1859 to 1866. In 1876, he was summoned to the House of Lords through a writ of acceleration in his father's junior title of Baron Ashford. He had previously joined the Conservative Party and served under Benjamin Disraeli and Lord Salisbury as Under-Secretary of State for War. He was succeeded by his eldest son, the eighth Earl. He was a colonel in the army and also briefly represented Birkenhead in Parliament.

As of 2017 the titles are held by his great-grandson, the tenth Earl, who succeeded his grandfather in 1979. Lord Albemarle is also in remainder to the ancient barony of de Clifford as the great-great-great-great-grandson of Elizabeth Southwell, daughter of Edward Southwell, 20th Baron de Clifford, and wife of the fourth Earl of Albemarle.

Several other members of the Keppel family have also gained distinction. Augustus Keppel, 1st Viscount Keppel, second son of the second Earl, was a prominent naval commander, when he passed his home Elveden Hall to his nephew the 1st Earl Albemarle, who sold it. William Keppel, third son of the second Earl, was a lieutenant-general in the army. Frederick Keppel, fourth son of the second Earl, was Bishop of Exeter. Sir Henry Keppel, fourth son of the fourth Earl, was an admiral in the Royal Navy. Sir Derek Keppel, second son of the seventh Earl, was a soldier and prominent member of the Royal household. George Keppel, third son of the seventh Earl, was the husband of Alice Edmondstone, one of the many mistresses of King Edward VII, and the father (although his paternity has been questioned) of the writer and socialite Violet Trefusis and of Mrs. Sonia Cubitt. The latter was the grandmother of Queen Camilla.

=== Coat of arms ===
The heraldic blazon for the coat of arms of the Keppel family is: Gules, three escallops argent, crest: earls-crown-proper.

=== Earls of Albemarle (1697) ===
- Arnold Joost van Keppel, 1st Earl of Albemarle (1670–1718)
- Willem Anne van Keppel, 2nd Earl of Albemarle (1702–1754)
- George Keppel, 3rd Earl of Albemarle (1724–1772)
- William Charles Keppel, 4th Earl of Albemarle (1772–1849)
  - William Keppel, Viscount Bury (1793–1804)
- Augustus Frederick Keppel, 5th Earl of Albemarle (1794–1851)
- George Thomas Keppel, 6th Earl of Albemarle (1799–1891)
- William Coutts Keppel, 7th Earl of Albemarle (1832–1894)
- Arnold Allan Cecil Keppel, 8th Earl of Albemarle (1858–1942)
- Walter Egerton George Lucian Keppel, 9th Earl of Albemarle (1882–1979)
  - Derek William Charles Keppel, Viscount Bury (1911–1968)
- Rufus Arnold Alexis Keppel, 10th Earl of Albemarle (born 1965)

The heir apparent is the present holder's son, Augustus Sergei Darius Keppel, Viscount Bury (born 2003).

=== Title succession chart ===
Title succession chart, Earls of Albemarle.

Arnold van Keppel; 1st Earl of Albemarle; 1670–1718
Willem van Keppel; 2nd Earl of Albemarle; 1702–1754
George Keppel; 3rd Earl of Albemarle; 1724–1772
William Keppel; 4th Earl of Albemarle; 1772–1849
William Keppel; Viscount Bury; 1793–1804	Augustus Keppel; 5th Earl of Albemarle; 1794–1851	George Keppel; 6th Earl of Albemarle; 1799–1891
William Keppel; 7th Earl of Albemarle; 1832–1894
Arnold Keppel; 8th Earl of Albemarle; 1858–1942
Walter Keppel; 9th Earl of Albemarle; 1882–1979
Derek Keppel; Viscount Bury; 1911–1968
Rufus Keppel; 10th Earl of Albemarle born 1965
Augustus Keppel; Viscount Bury born 2003

=== Line of succession ===
Earls of Albemarle line of succession
- Arnold Joost van Keppel, 1st Earl of Albemarle (1670–1718)
  - William Anne van Keppel, 2nd Earl of Albemarle (1702–1754)
    - Gen. George Keppel, 3rd Earl of Albemarle (1724–1772)
      - William Charles Keppel, 4th Earl of Albemarle (1772–1849)
        - William Keppel, Viscount Bury (1793–1804)
        - Augustus Frederick Keppel, 5th Earl of Albemarle (1794–1851)
        - Gen. George Thomas Keppel, 6th Earl of Albemarle (1799–1891)
          - William Coutts Keppel, 7th Earl of Albemarle (1832–1894)
            - Lt.-Col. Arnold Allen Cecil Keppel, 8th Earl of Albemarle (1858–1942)
              - Walter Egerton George Lucian Keppel, 9th Earl of Albemarle (1882–1979)
                - Derek William Charles Keppel, Viscount Bury (1911–1968)
                  - Rufus Arnold Alexis Keppel, 10th Earl of Albemarle (born 1965)
                    - (1) Augustus Sergei Darius Keppel, Viscount Bury (born 2003)
                - Lt.-Cdr. Walter Arnold Crispin Keppel (1914–1986)
                  - (2) Crispian Walter John Keppel (born 1948)
                  - (3) Colin Rupert Harrington Keppel (born 1951)
                    - (4) Oliver George Rupert Keppel (born 1982)
                    - (5) William George Crispian Keppel (born 1986)

== See also ==
- Viscount Keppel
- Duke of Albemarle
- Baron de Clifford
