= Lord Henry Howard-Molyneux-Howard =

British politician

The Lord Howard-Molyneux-Howard

Member of the Great Britain Parliament for Arundel
- In office 1790–1795 Serving with Sir George Thomas
- Preceded by: Thomas Fitzherbert; Richard Beckford
- Succeeded by: Sir Thomas Gascoigne; Sir George Thomas

Member of the Great Britain Parliament for Steyning
- In office 1790–1791 Serving with Sir James Lloyd
- Preceded by: Richard Howard; Sir John Honywood
- Succeeded by: John Curtis; Sir John Honywood

Member of the Great Britain Parliament for Gloucester
- In office 1795–1801 Serving with John Pitt
- Preceded by: John Webb; John Pitt
- Succeeded by: Parliament of the United Kingdom

Member of Parliament for Gloucester
- In office 1801–1818 Serving with John Pitt (Note: Served from 1801-1805); Robert Morris (Note: Served from 1805-1816); Edward Webb (Note: Served from 1816-1818)
- Preceded by: Parliament of Great Britain
- Succeeded by: Robert Cooper; Edward Webb

Member of Parliament for Arundel
- In office 1812–1812 Serving with Francis Wilder
- Preceded by: Sir Arthur Piggott; Francis Wilder
- Succeeded by: Sir Samuel Romilly; Francis Wilder
- In office 1818–1820 Serving with Sir Arthur Piggott (Note: Served from 1818-1819); Robert Blake (Note: Served from 1819-1820)
- Preceded by: Sir Samuel Romilly; Francis Wilder
- Succeeded by: Augustus Keppel; Robert Blake

Member of Parliament for Steying
- In office 1820–1824 Serving with Sir George Philips, 2nd Baronet
- Preceded by: Sir John Aubrey; Sir George Philips, 1st Baronet
- Succeeded by: Sir George Philips, 2nd Baronet; Henry Howard

Personal details
- Born: 7 October 1766
- Died: 17 June 1824 (aged 57)

Lord Henry Thomas Howard-Molyneux-Howard (7 October 1766 – 17 June 1824), known as Henry Howard until 1812, and as Henry Molyneux-Howard until 1817, was a British gentleman who served as Deputy Earl Marshal in the latter part of the reign of George III and early in the reign of George IV. On the inheritance of the Dukedom of Norfolk in 1815 by his elder brother Bernard, Henry Molyneux-Howard in 1817 was granted the courtesy title "Lord", the style of a younger son of a duke.

== Origins ==
Howard was the son of Henry Howard and his wife Juliana Molyneux, daughter of Sir William Molyneux, 6th Baronet, of Teversall, Nottinghamshire, High Sheriff of Nottinghamshire 1737.

== Career ==
On 24 May 1790 Howard was commissioned a captain in the North Battalion, Gloucestershire Militia. He first entered Parliament the same year, being returned for Arundel in Sussex, under the patronage of the Duke of Norfolk of Arundel Castle, and Steyning. His election for Steyning was overturned on petition in 1791, but he represented Arundel until 1795. He was then elected for Gloucester, which seat he held until 1818.

In 1812 on the death of his uncle Sir Francis Molyneux, 7th Baronet, Howard inherited the Molyneux estates of Teversal and Wellow, and under the terms of the bequest adopted the surname Molyneux-Howard. In 1814, he also purchased Aldingbourne House, formerly the seat of Lady Molyneux-Howard, and made some alterations to expand it. In 1815 his elder brother Bernard Howard succeeded a distant cousin as 12th Duke of Norfolk. Because Bernard was a Roman Catholic recusant, he was obliged to appoint a deputy to carry out his duties as Earl Marshal, and chose for this post his brother Henry, who was officially appointed to the post in March 1816.

On 14 October 1817 Molyneux-Howard resumed the use of Howard as his principal surname, becoming Henry Thomas Howard-Molyneux-Howard, and on the following day was granted a warrant of precedence to be styled as a younger son of a duke, and having thus gained the courtesy title "Lord", became known as Lord Henry Thomas Howard-Molyneux-Howard. He carried out his duties as Deputy Earl Marshal during the planning for the coronation of King George IV (1820–1830), but was unable by reason of illness to act at the actual event, at which his role was taken by his kinsman Lord Howard of Effingham. He was again returned to Parliament for Arundel from 1818 until 1820, in which latter year he was returned for Steyning, which seat he held until his death in 1824.

== Marriage and children ==
On 12 September 1801, Howard-Molyneux-Howard married Elizabeth Long, daughter of Edward Long (1734-1813), a British colonial administrator, historian and author of The History of Jamaica, by whom he had one son and four daughters:

- Henry Howard (1802–1875), Member of Parliament
- Henrietta Anna Molyneux-Howard (17 July 1804 – 26 May 1876), wife of Henry Herbert, 3rd Earl of Carnarvon and had issue.
- Isabella Catherine Mary Howard (29 September 1806 – 20 June 1891), wife of Charles Howard, 17th Earl of Suffolk and had issue.
- Charlotte Juliana Jane Howard (8 February 1809 – 15 December 1855), wife of James Wentworth Buller and mother of General Sir Redvers Henry Buller (1839–1908), V.C.
- Juliana Barbara Howard (31 March 1812 – 27 December 1833), wife of Sir John Ogilvy, 9th Baronet and had issue.

== Death and succession ==
Howard-Molyneux-Howard died aged 57 in June 1824 after a short illness in his house in Lower Grosvenor Street, Mayfair. His eldest son Henry Howard replaced him in Parliament. The Teversall and Wellow estates, which had been entailed on his second son or eldest daughter, descended to his daughter Henrietta Anna Howard, later Countess of Carnarvon, who adopted the surname of Molyneux-Howard in consequence.

== Notes ==
Parliament of Great Britain
Preceded by Thomas Fitzherbert; Richard Beckford	Member of Parliament for Arundel; 1790–1795; With: Sir George Thomas, Bt	Succeeded by Sir George Thomas, Bt; Sir Thomas Gascoigne, Bt
Preceded by Hon. Richard Howard; Sir John Honywood, Bt	Member of Parliament for Steyning; 1790–1791; With: James Martin Lloyd	Succeeded by Sir John Honywood, Bt; John Curtis
Preceded by John Webb; John Pitt	Member of Parliament for Gloucester; 1795–1801; With: John Pitt	Succeeded by Parliament of the United Kingdom
Parliament of the United Kingdom
Preceded by Parliament of Great Britain	Member of Parliament for Gloucester; 1801–1818; With: John Pitt 1801–1805; Robert Morris 1805–1816; Edward Webb 1816–1818	Succeeded by Edward Webb; Robert Bransby Cooper
Preceded by Sir Arthur Piggott; Francis Wilder	Member of Parliament for Arundel; 1812; With: Francis Wilder	Succeeded by Francis Wilder; Sir Samuel Romilly
Preceded by Francis Wilder; Sir Samuel Romilly	Member of Parliament for Arundel; 1818–1820; With: Sir Arthur Piggott 1818–1819; Robert Blake	Succeeded by Robert Blake; Viscount Bury
Preceded by Sir John Aubrey, Bt; George Philips	Member of Parliament for Steyning; 1820–1824; With: George Philips	Succeeded by George Philips; Henry Howard
