= Robert Bransby Cooper =

English politician

Robert Bransby Cooper (1762–1845), of Furney Hill, Dursley, Gloucestershire, was an English politician.

He was the son of Samuel Cooper, a clergyman of the Church of England and Maria Susanna Bransby, the author of several novels, and brother to noted surgeon Astley Cooper and uncle to Bransby Blake Cooper.

He was a Member (MP) of the Parliament of England for Gloucester 1818 to 1830.
