= Sir George Thomas, 3rd Baronet =

British politician

Sir George Thomas, 3rd Baronet (c. 1740 – 6 May 1815), was a British politician.

== Life ==
Thomas was the son of Sir William Thomas, 2nd Baronet, and he succeeded to his father's baronetcy in 1777.

In 1780, he created Dale Park near Madehurst by buying up separate pieces of land and joining them together into an estate. The exchange with his relative George White Thomas of lands in Yapton, Walberton, Madehurst, Bilsham and Climping was validated by a private act of Parliament, Sir George Thomas and George White Thomas Estates Act 1823 (4 Geo. 4. c. 16 Pr.). Thomas married Sophia Montagu, daughter of Admiral John Montagu and Sophia Wroughton, on 20 December 1782. The lived in Madehurst Lodge during the 1780s whilst their new house was constructed by the architect Joseph Bonomi. The house is thought to have still been under construction in 1791.

He sat in the House of Commons of Great Britain as the Member of Parliament for Arundel between 1790 and 1797.

Parliament of Great Britain
Preceded by Thomas Fitzherbert; Richard Beckford	Member of Parliament for Arundel; 1790–1797; With: Henry Thomas Howard 1790–1795; Sir Thomas Gascoigne 1795–1796; James Greene 1796–1797	Succeeded by James Greene; Nisbet Balfour
Baronetage of Great Britain
Preceded by William Thomas	Baronet (of Yapton); 1777–1815	Succeeded by William Thomas
