= Arundel (constituency) =

UK Parliament constituency (1295–1868, 1974–1997)

- Former county constituency for the House of Commons
- County: Sussex
- Major settlements: Arundel

1974–1997
- Seats: One
- Created from: Arundel & Shoreham
- Replaced by: Arundel & South Downs and Bognor Regis & Littlehampton

1295–1868
- Seats: 1295–1832: Two; 1832–1868: One
- Type of constituency: Borough constituency
- Replaced by: West Sussex

Arundel was twice a parliamentary constituency in the Kingdom of England, the Kingdom of Great Britain, and the United Kingdom. The first incarnation strictly comprised the town centre of Arundel and was a borough constituency in Sussex first enfranchised in 1295 and disfranchised in 1868 under the Reform Act 1867. Arundel initially elected two members, but this was reduced to one in 1832 by the Great Reform Act.

The second incarnation was broader, reaching to Bognor Regis. It was created by the Boundary Commission in the 1974 boundary changes, and existed until 1997. This Arundel seat elected only one member. The territory previously covered by Arundel was split between Arundel & South Downs and Bognor Regis & Littlehampton constituencies.

== Members of Parliament ==
1295–1640 — 1640–1832 — 1832–1868 — Jump to Elections

=== 1295–1640 ===
Parliament	First member	Second member
1386	William Colyn	Richard Wodeland
1388 (Feb)	Roger Clerk	John Hereward
1388 (Sep)	Robert Fisher	Nicholas Hereward
1390 (Jan)	William Colchestre	Robert Fisher
1390 (Nov)		
1391	Hugh Hasell	Richard Wodeland
1393	John Chamberlain	Robert Fisher
1394		
1395	Richard Wodeland	Robert Fisher
1397 (Jan)	Henry Skimmer	Richard Wodeland
1397 (Sep)	John Patching	Richard Wodeland
1399	John Esshing	William Terry
1401	William Terry	John Wiltshire
1402	John Dusse	John Wyldebess
1404 (Jan)		
1404 (Oct)		
1406	John Patching	Thomas Spicer
1407	John Dusse	John Patching
1410	John Wiltshire	
1411		
1413 (Feb)		
1413 (May)	John Dusse	John Wiltshire
1414 (Apr)		
1414 (Nov)	John Dusse	John Patching
1415		
1416 (Mar)	William Chapman	Richard Smith
1416 (Oct)		
1417	Thomas Dusse	Richard Smith
1419	John Hilly	Thomas Kyng
1420	Thomas Dusse	Thomas Pursell
1421 (May)	John Hilly	Alan Chamber
1421 (Dec)	Thomas Pursell	Thomas Dusse
1449	Thomas Bellingham	
1459	Thomas Bellingham	
1510-1523	No names known	
1529	Richard Sackville	Thomas Prestall
1536	?	
1539	?	
1542	?	
1545	?	
1547	Sir Nicholas Pelham	Thomas Carpenter
1553 (Mar)	Thomas Palmer	Thomas Morley
1553 (Oct)	Sir Thomas Palmer	Thomas Gawdy
1554 (Apr)	Sir Thomas Holcroft	Sir Thomas Stradling
1554 (Nov)	John Burnet	Richard Bowyer
1555	Sir Henry Paget	Sir William Damsell
1558	Edward Stradling	David Stradling
1559	Sir Francis Knollys	Thomas Heneage
1562–3	Sir John St Leger	William Aubrey
1571	Thomas Browne	Michael Heneage
1572	Thomas Fanshawe	Richard Browne
1584	Thomas Fanshawe	Robert Buxton
1586	Thomas Fanshawe	Thomas Palmer
1588	Sir Owen Hopton	Thomas Fanshawe
1593	Thomas Fanshawe	Richard Baker
1597	William Essex	James Smith
1601	Thomas Palmer	Thomas Baker
1604-1611	Thomas Preston	John Tye
1614	Sir Henry Spiller	Edward Morley
1621	Lionel Cranfield, ennobled Sep 1622 and repl. Nov 1622 by Sir Richard Weston	Sir Henry Spiller
1624	Sir Henry Spiller	Sir George Chaworth replaced 1624 on petition by William Mill
1625	Sir Henry Spiller	William Mill
1626	Nicholas Jordain	William Mill
1628	John Alford	Henry Lord Maltravers
1629–1640	No Parliaments summoned	

Back to Members of Parliament

=== 1640–1832 ===
Year	First member	First party	Second member	Second party
April 1640	Henry Garton	Parliamentarian	Henry Goring	
November 1640	Henry Garton	Parliamentarian	Sir Edward Alford	Royalist
1641	John Downes	Parliamentarian	Sir Edward Alford	Royalist
January 1644	John Downes	Parliamentarian	Alford disabled from sitting - seat vacant	
1645	John Downes	Parliamentarian	Herbert Hay	
December 1648	John Downes	Parliamentarian	Hay excluded in Pride's Purge - seat vacant	
1653	Arundel was unrepresented in the Barebones Parliament			
1654	Anthony Shirley		Arundel had only one seat in the First and Second Parliaments of the Protectorate	
1656	Sir John Trevor		Arundel had only one seat in the First and Second Parliaments of the Protectorate	
January 1659	Henry Onslow		Richard Marriot	
May 1659	John Downes		One seat vacant	
April 1660	The Earl of Orrery		The Viscount Falkland	
May 1660	The Earl of Orrery		John Trevor	
1661	The Earl of Orrery		The Lord Aungier of Longford	
1679	William Garway		James Butler	
1685	William Garway		William Westbrooke	
1689	William Garway		William Morley	
1690	James Butler		William Morley	
January 1694	James Butler		Lord Walden	
February 1694	James Butler		John Cooke	
1695	Lord Walden		Edmund Dummer	
1698	John Cooke		Christopher Knight	
January 1701	John Cooke		Edmund Dummer	
November 1701	John Cooke		Carew Weekes	
1702	Edmund Dummer		Carew Weekes	
1705	Edmund Dummer		James Butler	
May 1708	Sir Henry Peachey, Bt		The Viscount Shannon	
December 1708	Viscount Lumley		The Viscount Shannon	
1710	The Earl of Thomond		Viscount Lumley	Whig
1715	General Henry Lumley		Thomas Micklethwaite	
1718	General Henry Lumley		Joseph Micklethwaite	
1722	Thomas Lumley		Joseph Micklethwaite	
1727	Sir John Shelley, Bt		The Viscount Gage	
1728	Sir John Shelley, Bt		John Lumley	
1739	Sir John Shelley, Bt		Garton Orme	
1741	James Lumley		Garton Orme	
1747	Theobald Taafe		Garton Orme	
1754	Sir George Colebrooke, Bt		Thomas Griffin	
1761	Sir George Colebrooke, Bt		John Bristow	
1768	Sir George Colebrooke, Bt		Lauchlin Macleane	
1771	Sir George Colebrooke, Bt		John Stewart	
1774	Thomas Brand		George Newnham	
1780	Sir Patrick Crauford	Whig	Thomas Fitzherbert	Tory
1781	Peter William Baker		Thomas Fitzherbert	Tory
April 1784	Earl of Surrey	Whig	Thomas Fitzherbert	Tory
June 1784	Richard Beckford	Whig	Thomas Fitzherbert	Tory
1790	Sir George Thomas, Bt	Tory	Henry Howard	Whig
1795	Sir George Thomas, Bt	Tory	Sir Thomas Gascoigne, Bt	
1796	Sir George Thomas, Bt	Tory	James Greene	Whig
1797	Nisbet Balfour		James Greene	Whig
1802	Viscount Andover	Whig	John Atkins	Tory
1806	Sir Arthur Piggott	Whig	Francis Wilder	Whig
January 1807	Sir Arthur Piggott	Whig	The Lord Lecale	Whig
May 1807	Sir Arthur Piggott	Whig	Francis Wilder	Whig
October 1812	Henry Molyneux-Howard	Whig	Francis Wilder	Whig
December 1812	Sir Samuel Romilly	Whig	Francis Wilder	Whig
1818	Lord Henry Howard-Molyneux-Howard	Whig	Sir Arthur Piggott	Whig
1819	Lord Henry Howard-Molyneux-Howard	Whig	Robert Blake	Tory
1820	Viscount Bury	Whig	Robert Blake	Tory
1823	Viscount Bury	Whig	Thomas Read Kemp	Whig
1826	Edward Lombe	Whig	John Atkins	Tory
1830	Lord Dudley Stuart	Whig	John Atkins	Tory
1832	Representation reduced to one member			

Back to Members of Parliament

=== 1832–1868 ===
Year	Member	Party
1832	Lord Dudley Stuart	Whig
1837	Henry Fitzalan-Howard, Earl of Arundel	Whig
1851	Edward Strutt	Whig
1852	Lord Edward Fitzalan-Howard	Whig
1859	Lord Edward Fitzalan-Howard	Liberal
1868	Constituency abolished	

Back to Members of Parliament

== Arundel County Constituency (1974–1997) ==
Election	Member	Party
Feb 1974	Sir Michael Marshall	Conservative
1997	Constituency abolished: see Arundel and South Downs & Bognor Regis and Littlehampton	

== Elections ==
1830s – 1840s – 1850s – 1860s – 1970s – 1980s – 1990s

=== Elections in the 1830s ===
General election 1830: Arundel
Party	Candidate	Votes	%	±%
Whig	Dudley Stuart	Unopposed		
Tory	John Atkins	Unopposed		
Whig hold				
Tory hold				

General election 1831: Arundel
Party	Candidate	Votes	%	±%
Tory	John Atkins	85	49.4	N/A
Whig	Dudley Stuart	85	49.4	N/A
Radical	Godfrey Webster	2	1.2	N/A
Majority		83	48.2	N/A
Turnout		87		N/A
Tory hold		Swing	N/A	
Whig hold		Swing	N/A	

General election 1832: Arundel
Party	Candidate	Votes	%	±%
Whig	Dudley Stuart	Unopposed		
Registered electors		351		
Whig hold				

General election 1835: Arundel
Party	Candidate	Votes	%	±%
Whig	Dudley Stuart	Unopposed		
Registered electors		360		
Whig hold				

General election 1837: Arundel
Party	Candidate	Votes	%	±%
Whig	Henry Fitzalan-Howard	176	62.6	N/A
Whig	Dudley Stuart	105	37.4	N/A
Majority		71	25.2	N/A
Turnout		281	87.3	N/A
Registered electors		322		
Whig hold		Swing	N/A	

=== Elections in the 1840s ===
General election 1841: Arundel
Party	Candidate	Votes	%	±%
Whig	Henry Fitzalan-Howard	Unopposed		
Registered electors		261		
Whig hold				

General election 1847: Arundel
Party	Candidate	Votes	%	±%
Whig	Henry Fitzalan-Howard	Unopposed		
Registered electors		221		
Whig hold				

Back to Elections

=== Elections in the 1850s ===
FitzAlan-Howard's resignation in protest at the passing of the Ecclesiastical Titles Act 1851 caused a by-election.

By-election, 16 July 1851: Arundel
Party	Candidate	Votes	%	±%
Whig	Edward Strutt	Unopposed		
Whig hold				

General election 1852: Arundel
Party	Candidate	Votes	%	±%
Whig	Edward Fitzalan-Howard	Unopposed		
Registered electors		208		
Whig hold				

General election 1857: Arundel
Party	Candidate	Votes	%	±%
Whig	Edward Fitzalan-Howard	Unopposed		
Registered electors		199		
Whig hold				

General election 1859: Arundel
Party	Candidate	Votes	%	±%
Liberal	Edward Fitzalan-Howard	Unopposed		
Registered electors		196		
Liberal hold				

Back to Elections

=== Elections in the 1860s ===
General election 1865: Arundel
Party	Candidate	Votes	%	±%
Liberal	Edward Fitzalan-Howard	Unopposed		
Registered electors		174		
Liberal hold				

Back to Elections

=== Elections in the 1970s ===
General election February 1974: Arundel
Party	Candidate	Votes	%	±%
Conservative	Robert Marshall	37,655	57.1	
Liberal	John Rex Kingsbury	17,712	26.9	
Labour	Ben Pimlott	10,597	16.1	
Majority		19,943	30.2	
Turnout		65,964	79.6	
Conservative win (new seat)				

General election October 1974: Arundel
Party	Candidate	Votes	%	±%
Conservative	Robert Marshall	34,215	56.2	−0.9
Liberal	John Rex Kingsbury	15,404	25.3	−1.6
Labour	Michael Ewart Stedman	11,268	18.5	+2.4
Majority		18,811	30.9	+0.7
Turnout		60,887	73.0	−6.6
Conservative hold		Swing	+0.4	

General election 1979: Arundel
Party	Candidate	Votes	%	±%
Conservative	Robert Marshall	43,968	65.0	+8.8
Liberal	John Rex Kingsbury	13,208	19.5	−5.8
Labour	John Nigel Tizard	10,509	15.5	−3.0
Majority		30,760	35.5	+4.6
Turnout		67,685	73.9	+0.9
Conservative hold		Swing	+7.3	

Back to elections

=== Elections in the 1980s ===
General election 1983: Arundel
Party	Candidate	Votes	%	±%
Conservative	Robert Marshall	31,096	59.6	−5.4
Liberal	James Walsh	15,391	29.5	+10.0
Labour	Gareth Rees	4,302	8.2	−7.3
Conservative for Corporal Punishment	John Wadman	1,399	2.7	New
Majority		15,705	30.1	−5.4
Turnout		52,188	69.7	−4.2
Conservative hold		Swing	−7.7	

General election 1987: Arundel
Party	Candidate	Votes	%	±%
Conservative	Robert Marshall	34,356	61.3	+1.7
Liberal	James Walsh	15,476	27.6	−1.9
Labour	Peter Slowe	6,177	11.0	+2.8
Majority		18,880	33.7	+3.6
Turnout		56,009	71.2	+1.5
Conservative hold		Swing	+1.8	

Back to Elections

=== Elections in the 1990s ===
General election 1992: Arundel
Party	Candidate	Votes	%	±%
Conservative	Robert Marshall	35,405	58.0	−3.3
Liberal Democrats	James Walsh	15,542	25.5	−2.1
Labour	Roger Nash	8,321	13.6	+2.6
Liberal	Denise Renson	1,103	1.8	N/A
Green	Robert Corbin	693	1.1	New
Majority		19,863	32.5	−1.2
Turnout		61,064	77.0	+5.8
Conservative hold		Swing	−0.6	

Back to Top

== See also ==
- List of parliamentary constituencies in West Sussex

== Sources ==
- Election results, 1974 - 1997
- Concise Dictionary of National Biography (entry on Sir Nicholas Pelham)
- D Brunton & D H Pennington, Members of the Long Parliament (London: George Allen & Unwin, 1954)
- Cobbett's Parliamentary history of England, from the Norman Conquest in 1066 to the year 1803 (London: Thomas Hansard, 1808)
- Maija Jansson (ed.), Proceedings in Parliament, 1614 (House of Commons) (Philadelphia: American Philosophical Society, 1988)
- J Holladay Philbin, Parliamentary Representation 1832 - England and Wales (New Haven: Yale University Press, 1965)
