= Edward Southwell, 20th Baron de Clifford =

British politician 1738–1777

The Right Honourable The Lord de Clifford
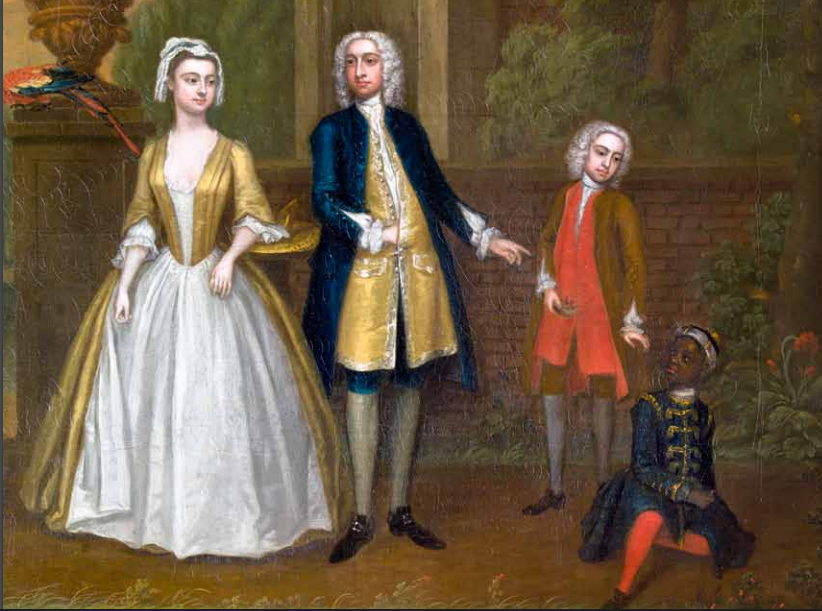

Member of Parliament for Gloucestershire
- In office 1763–1776 Serving with Thomas Tracy; Sir William Guise
- Preceded by: Thomas Chester; Thomas Tracy
- Succeeded by: Sir William Guise; William Bromley-Chester

Member of Parliament for Kinsale
- In office 1761–1768 Serving with John Folliott; Agmondisham Vesey
- Preceded by: Richard Ponsonby; Jonas Stawell
- Succeeded by: Agmondisham Vesey; James Kearney

Member of Parliament for Bridgwater
- In office 1761–1763 Serving with The Earl of Egmont; Viscount Perceval
- Preceded by: Robert Balch; The Earl of Egmont
- Succeeded by: Viscount Perceval; The Lord Coleraine

Personal details
- Born: 6 June 1738
- Died: 1 November 1777 (aged 39)
- Party: Whig
- Spouse: Sophia Campbell (m. 1765)
- Relations: Edward Southwell (grandfather); Elizabeth Cromwell (grandmother); Thomas Watson, 3rd Earl of Rockingham (uncle); Edward Watson, Viscount Sondes (uncle)
- Parent(s): Lady Catherine Watson; Edward Southwell Jr.
- Education: Westminster School; Pembroke College, Cambridge

Edward Southwell, 20th Baron de Clifford (6 June 1738 – 1 November 1777) was a British politician.

== Early life ==
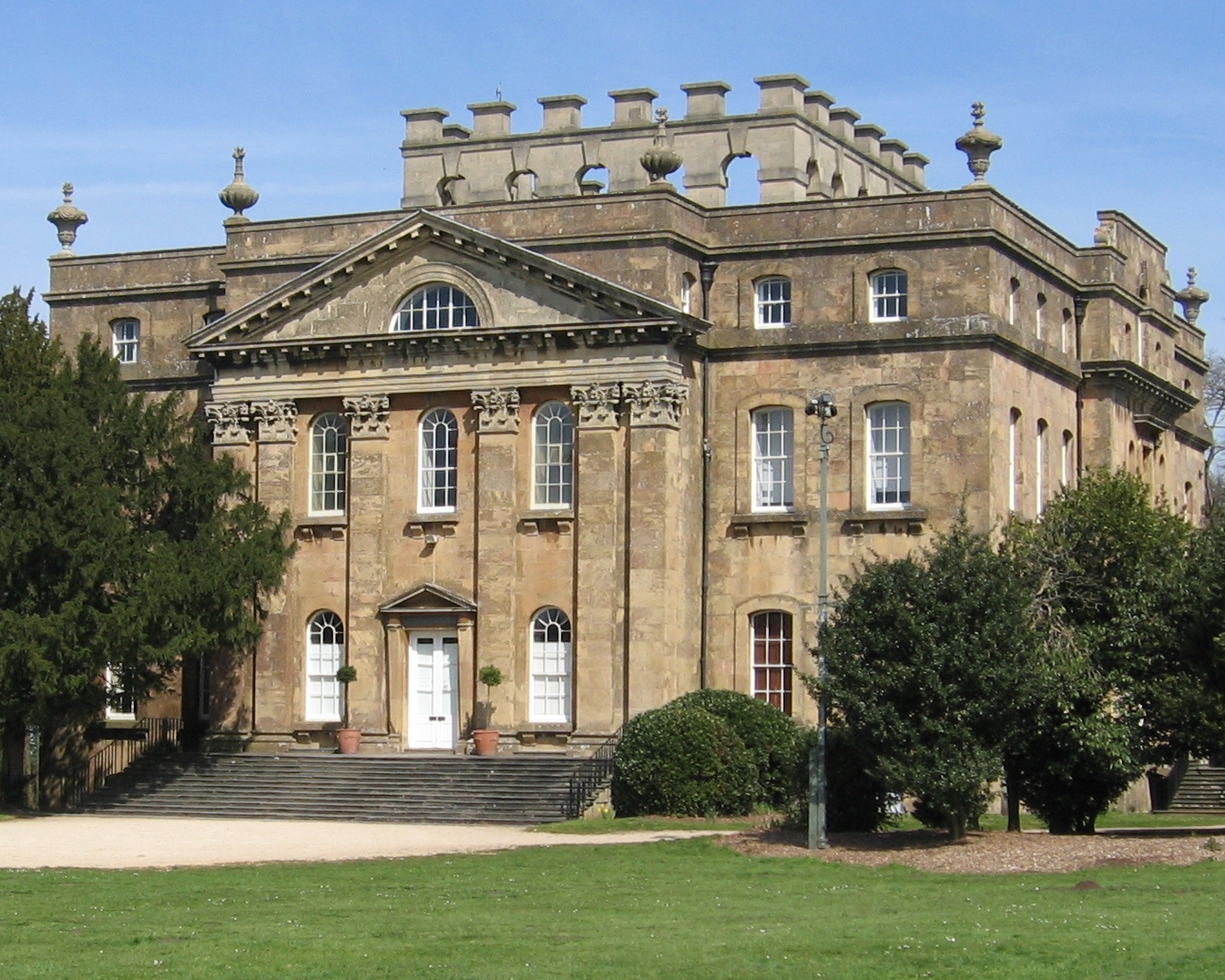
Kings Weston in Bristol.

Southwell was born on 6 June 1738 as the only son and heir of Lady Katherine Watson and Edward Southwell Jr. (1705–1755). His father and grandfather had both served as Principal Secretary of State for Ireland.

His paternal grandparents were Edward Southwell (son of Sir Robert Southwell) and Elizabeth Cromwell. His maternal grandparents were Edward Watson, Viscount Sondes and Lady Katherine Tufton, eldest daughter and coheiress of Thomas Tufton, 6th Earl of Thanet and 18th Baron de Clifford. His uncle was Thomas Watson, 3rd Earl of Rockingham.

He was educated at Westminster School and Pembroke College, Cambridge. Upon the death of his father in 1755, he inherited the Kings Weston estate near Bristol.

== Career ==
Southwell was elected to the British House of Commons as a Whig Member of Parliament for Bridgwater on 28 March 1761, sitting until 1763. On 23 November 1763, he was returned for Gloucestershire, sitting until 1776. He also represented Kinsale in the Irish House of Commons from May 1761 to 1768.

On 17 April 1776, the abeyance of the Barony of Clifford was terminated in his favour, and he entered the British House of Lords as 20th Baron de Clifford. The Barony was previously held by Margaret Coke, Countess of Leicester (his maternal grandmother's youngest sister), who died on 28 February 1775. He himself died eleven months later.

== Personal life ==
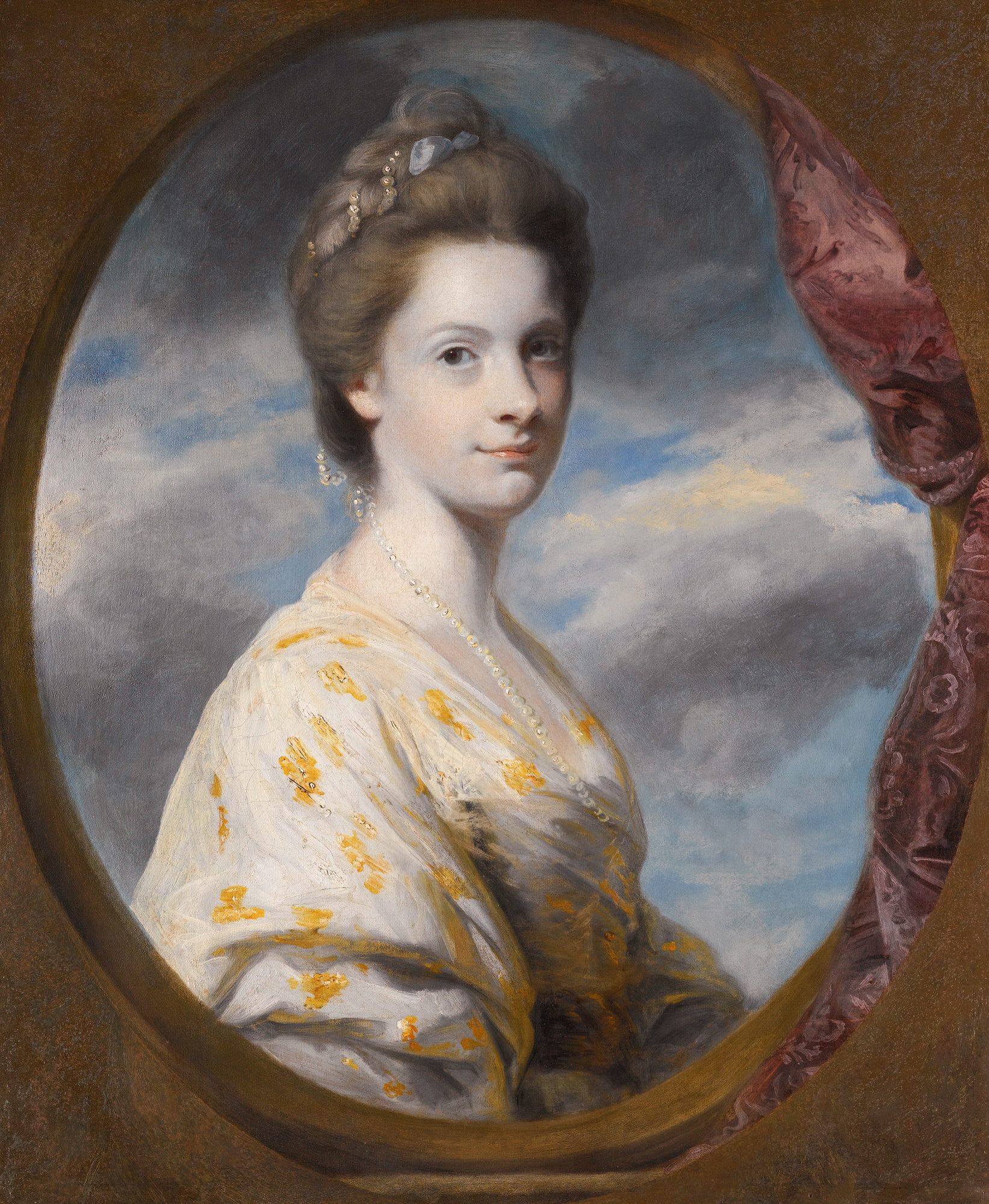
Sophia, Mrs Edward Southwell, later Lady de Clifford (1743–1828) (Joshua Reynolds, 1766)

On 29 August 1765, Edward Southwell married Sophia Campbell, the daughter of Samuel Campbell of Mount Campbell in County Leitrim. Together they were the parents of one son and four daughters, including:

- Edward Southwell, 21st Baron de Clifford (1767–1832), who married on 19 February 1789, at St Anne's Church, Dublin, Mary Elizabeth Bourke, daughter of the Most Rev. Joseph Deane Bourke, 3rd Earl of Mayo and his wife, Elizabeth Meade, sister of John Meade, 1st Earl of Clanwilliam. Diary of the Times of George IV by Lady Charlotte Susan Maria Campbell (page 29) records Lady de Clifford as Governess to Princess Charlotte of Wales. This would be Mary Elizabeth Bourke, who was Lady de Clifford from her marriage in 1789, not her mother-in-law Sophia Campbell, who is generally attributed as Princess Charlotte's governess, but was by then the dowager Lady de Clifford, widow of Edward Southwell, 20th Lord de Clifford, who died in 1777. William Henry Wilkins states in his Mrs. Fitzherbert and George IV (p. 261) that Lady de Clifford was "Sophia, Lady de Clifford married to Edward, 20th Baron de Clifford", but at the time around 1810, Sophia would have been in her mid-sixties and Mary in her early forties, so that Mary seems the likelier candidate to be the Lady de Clifford referred to.
- Hon. Catherine Southwell (d. 1801), who married Col. George Kein Hayward Coussmaker (1759–1801) in 1790
- Hon. Sophia Southwell (1771–1795), who married John Townshend, 2nd Viscount Sydney in 1790
- Hon. Elizabeth Southwell (1776–1817), who married at St. George’s Church, Hanover Square, London, on 9 April 1792, William Keppel, 4th Earl of Albemarle
- Hon. Henrietta Southwell, who married Frederick Delmé in 1799

Baron de Clifford died on 1 November 1777 and was buried at Henbury, Gloucestershire. After his death, his widow, Lady de Clifford, was according to some accounts appointed Governess to Princess Charlotte, daughter of the future King George IV. His eldest son, who died with no issue, succeeded him as the 21st Baron de Clifford, and was himself succeeded by the 20th Baron's granddaughter, Sophia Coussmaker (1791–1874), who became the 22nd Baroness de Clifford suo jure after the death of her uncle in 1832.

=== Descendants ===
Through his eldest daughter Catherine, Southwell was a grandfather of Sophia Coussmaker, who became the 22nd Baroness de Clifford. She married John Russell, third son of Lord William Russell, and was the mother of Edward Russell, 23rd Baron de Clifford, a Member of Parliament for Tavistock.

Through his daughter Sophia, he was a grandfather of the Hon. Sophia Mary Townshend, who married Lt. Col. Hon. Peregrine Francis Cust, and of Mary Elizabeth Townshend, who married George James Cholmondeley, Receiver-General of Excise and secondly to Charles Marsham, 2nd Earl of Romney.

Through his daughter Elizabeth, who married Mrs. Fitzherbert's trustee, William Keppel, 4th Earl of Albemarle, Southwell had eleven grandchildren, including: Augustus Keppel, 5th Earl of Albemarle; Lady Sophia Keppel, who married Sir James Macdonald, 2nd Baronet; George Keppel, 6th Earl of Albemarle; the Reverend Hon. Edward Southwell Keppel, the Dean of Norwich who married Lady Maria (daughter of Nathaniel Clements, 2nd Earl of Leitrim); Lady Anne Keppel, who married Thomas Coke, 1st Earl of Leicester and secondly, Edward Ellice; Lady Mary Keppel, who married Henry Frederick Stephenson MP; Admiral Hon. Sir Henry Keppel; Reverend Hon. Thomas Robert Keppel, who married Frances Barrett-Lennard (daughter of Sir Thomas Barrett-Lennard, 1st Baronet); Lady Caroline Keppel, who married the Very Reverend Thomas Garnier; and Lady Georgiana Charlotte, who married William Henry Magan.

== Papers ==
Documents relating to Edward Southwell, including family papers, deeds, financial records and estate records, are held by Bristol Archives (Ref. 42725 and 45317) (online catalogue page 1 online catalogue page 2)

Parliament of Ireland
Preceded by Richard Ponsonby; Jonas Stawell	Member of Parliament for Kinsale; 1761–1768; With: John Folliott 1761–1765; Agmondisham Vesey 1765–1768	Succeeded by Agmondisham Vesey; James Kearney
Parliament of Great Britain
Preceded by Robert Balch; The Earl of Egmont	Member of Parliament for Bridgwater; 1761–1763; With: The Earl of Egmont 1761–1762; Viscount Perceval 1762–1763	Succeeded by Viscount Perceval; The Lord Coleraine
Preceded by Thomas Chester; Thomas Tracy	Member of Parliament for Gloucestershire; 1763–1776; With: Thomas Tracy 1763–1770; Sir William Guise 1770–1776	Succeeded by Sir William Guise; William Bromley-Chester
Peerage of England
In abeyance Title last held by Margaret Coke	Baron de Clifford; 1776–1777	Succeeded by Edward Southwell
