= George Cunningham Monteath =

Scottish physician

- Born: 4 December 1788
- Died: 25 January 1828 (aged 39)
- Occupation: Physician

George Cunningham Monteath (4 December 1788 – 25 January 1828) was a Scottish physician and oculist.

== Biography ==
Monteath was the son of John Monteath, minister of the parish of Neilston, was born there on 4 December 1788. He attended the medical classes in Glasgow, and afterwards studied under Sir Astley Cooper in London, where he was licensed as a practitioner by the Royal College of Surgeons. From 1809 to 1813 he acted as surgeon to the Northumberland regiment of militia, and then established himself in Glasgow as a physician and oculist. His practice increased rapidly. He was the first specialist in cases of eye disease to practise in Glasgow, and every case of difficulty in the west of Scotland came under his treatment. In 1821 he published a 'Manual of the Diseases of the Human Eye,' 2 vols. 8vo, which was long a standard book. Monteath died from a chill in Glasgow on 25 January 1828.
