= Richard Bowyer =

Richard Bowyer may refer to:

- Richard Bowyer (MP), MP for Arundel
- Richard Bowyer (priest) (died 1471), Canon of Windsor

== See also ==
- Richard Bowyer Smith (1837–1919), Australian inventor
