= William Morley (died 1597) =

16th century English politician

William Morley (ca. 1531 – 24 November 1597) was an English politician.

He was the eldest son of Thomas Morley of Glynde, Sussex and educated at Cambridge University.

He was appointed High Sheriff of Surrey and Sussex for 1580–81. He was a Member (MP) of the Parliament of England for Lewes in 1571.

He was married twice: firstly Ann, the daughter of Anthony Pelham of Warbleton, Sussex, with whom he had 1 or 2 sons and 3 daughters and secondly Margaret, the daughter of William Roberts of Warbleton, with whom he had a further 2 or 3 sons and a daughter. He was succeeded by his son Herbert Morley.
