= Thomas Prestall =

16th-century English politician

Thomas Prestall (by 1503 – 1551), of Poling, Houghton, Sussex and London, was an English politician.

He was a member of parliament (MP) for Arundel in 1529.
