= Michael Marshall (politician) =

British businessman, politician, cricketer and author

Sir Robert Michael Marshall, DL (21 June 1930 – 6 September 2006), usually known as Michael Marshall, was a British businessman, politician, cricketer and author.

After a career in the steel industry, he was Conservative Member of Parliament for Arundel for 23 years, from the February 1974 general election until the constituency was abolished in 1997.

He was the first MP with an MBA from Harvard, and was a junior government minister in Margaret Thatcher's first government, from 1979 to 1981. He was heavily engaged with the Inter-Parliamentary Union, and had interests in theatre, cricket, golf, and wrote a number of books.

== Early and private life ==
Marshall was born in Sheffield. His father was a printer, and his mother performed in music hall. He was educated at Bradfield College before began he a business career.

He joined United Steel in Sheffield in 1951, managed a branch in Calcutta from 1954 to 1958, obtained an MBA from Harvard University in 1960, and also studied at Stanford University, and then managed a branch in Bombay until 1964. He was commercial director at the company's steelworks in Workington from 1964, and then moved to become managing director of engineering group Head Wrightson Export in 1967. He joined Urwick Orr & Partners as a management consultant in 1969.

He married Caroline Oliphant in 1972, acquiring two stepdaughters.

== Political career ==
He joined the Young Conservatives in 1950, but remained relatively inactive in politics until 1970, when he contested The Hartlepools, a safe Labour seat. He became MP for Arundel in the February 1974 general election, and retained his seat until his retirement from politics in 1997.

In Parliament, his knowledge of the steel industry made him an effective critic of Sir Don Ryder's plan to nationalise British Leyland. He was a member of the Select Committee on Nationalised Industries, and realised that British Steel Corporation needed major reconstruction. He was able to implement his ideas when he became Parliamentary Under-Secretary of State at the Department of Industry in 1979, under Sir Keith Joseph, where his portfolio that included aerospace, information technology, telecommunications, the Post Office, shipbuilding, space and steel. He was a strong supporter of Japanese investment in British industry. He oversaw the denationalisation of Cable & Wireless and the launch of Teletext.

Marshall returned to the back benches in 1981, when Margaret Thatcher carried out the first major reshuffle of her government. He took an interest in the fledgling British space industry, lobbying for British participation in Ariane. He was also a member of the Defence Select Committee, a role that was controversial as he was a paid adviser to British Aerospace. He was also involved in the parliamentary-industry discussion group, Pitcom, becoming its chairman in 1987.

He was closely involved with the Inter-Parliamentary Union, being a vice-chairman from 1985 to 1987, chairman from 1987 to 1990, presiding over its Centenary Conference in 1989, was its world president from 1991 to 1994, and was then appointed honorary life president. He was knighted and appointed a deputy lieutenant of West Sussex in 1990.

He retired at the 1997 general election, when the boundaries of his seat were changed. He continued his business interests in retirement. After converting to Roman Catholicism in later life, he became a non-executive director of The Catholic Herald in 2003.

== Outside politics ==
Marshall was a keen cricketer, having played for Harvard and Nepal. He captained the Lords and Commons Cricket XI, was a member of the MCC, and was active in the Lord's Taverners. He also commentated on cricket in India for the BBC, and was a member of the All India Radio Test match panel during his 10 years working in India. He also played golf, and was a member of The Royal and Ancient Golf Club of St Andrews and a club near Worthing.

He was also an author. He published Top Hat and Tails in 1979, a biography of Jack Buchanan; The Timetable of Technology in 1982; Gentlemen and Players in 1987, an account of the annual Gentlemen versus Players cricket matches held between English first-class cricket amateurs and their professional colleagues from 1919 to 1962; Cricket at the Castle in 1995, about cricket at Arundel Castle Cricket Club; and More Sussex Seams in 1999. He also wrote five plays for television, and biographies for radio, and edited two volumes of monologues by Stanley Holloway, published in 1979 and 1980, as well as The Book of Comic and Dramatic Monologues, published in 1981.

He was interested in the theatre, and was a member of Equity and Bafta. He was a trustee of the Theatres Trust from 1987 to 1999, and became Chairman of the Chichester Festival Theatre Trust in 1997. He was made an honorary Fellow of the University of Chichester in 2004. He was a member of the Garrick Club and the Beefsteak Club. He was elected as a Fellow of the Royal Society of Arts.

He was diagnosed with cancer in 1998, but continued to be active. He died in Chichester and his funeral was held at Slindon Roman Catholic Church. At his subsequent memorial service at Arundel Cathedral, John Major gave an address.

Parliament of the United Kingdom
New constituency	Member of Parliament for Arundel; 1974–1997	Constituency abolished
