= John Burnet (MP) =

16th-century English politician

John Burnet (by 1527–57/59), of Arundel, Sussex, was an English politician.

== Family ==
Burnet married Elizabeth Shepherd, the widow of tradesman and innkeeper Adam Shepherd, also from Arundel, who died in 1549. The year she married Burnet is unknown, but is estimated at 1550 or 1551. They seem to have had no children together, but two stepsons are mentioned in his will, presumably the sons of Adam Shepherd.

== Career ==
Burnet was a burgess of Arundel in 1548. He was a member of parliament (MP) for Arundel in November 1554.

== Death ==
Burnet made his will on 13 November 1557, while ill. He asked to be buried in Arundel church. His goods were valued at £18 19s.2d.
