= Maria Susanna Cooper =

English writer and poet (1737–1807)

- Born: Maria Susanna Bransby; 20 August 1737; Shotesham, Norfolk, England
- Died: 3 July 1807 (aged 69); Dursley, Gloucestershire, England
- Occupations: novelist; poet
- Spouse: Samuel Cooper
- Children: Robert Bransby Cooper (son); Astley Cooper (son)
- Relatives: Bransby Blake Cooper (grandchild)
- Writing career
- Pen name: "A lady"; "the authoress of"
- Years active: c. 1750—1784
- Notable work: The Exemplary Mother (1769)

Maria Susanna Cooper (née Bransby, 1737–1807) was an English novelist, children's author, and poet, best known for her epistolary novels. Her writing, didactic and conservative, focused on appropriate roles for daughters, wives, and mothers.

== Life ==
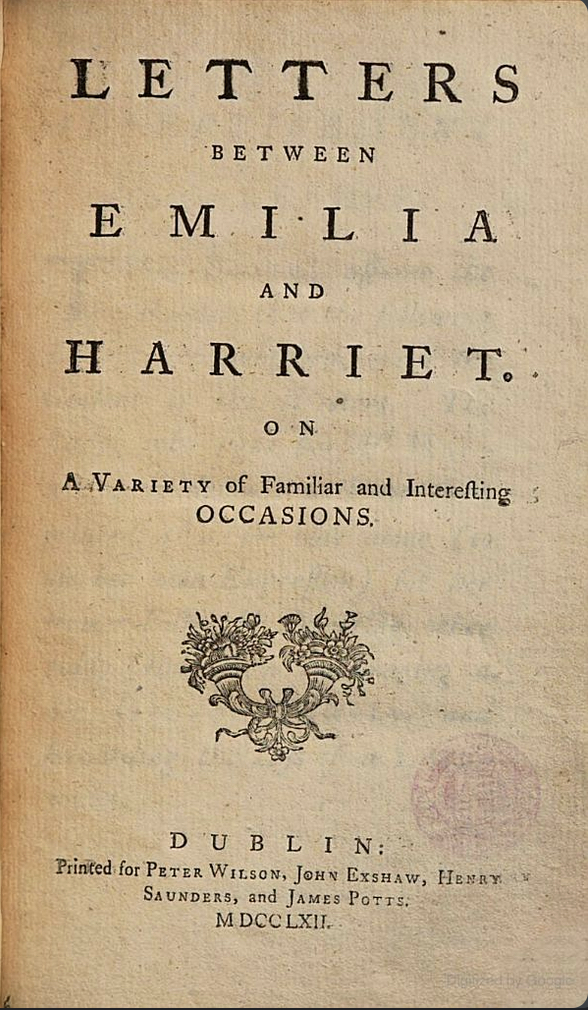
Title page of Maria Susanna Cooper's Letters between Emilia and Harriet (Dublin 1762)

Maria Susanna was born 20 August 1737 in Shotesham, Norfolk, to James Bransby and Anna Maria Paston. She married Samuel Cooper in 1761 but although her husband was soon appointed rector at Yelverton, they remained in Shotesham for two decades. In 1781, the Cooper family moved to Great Yarmouth when Samuel Cooper was appointed curate there.

Over the course of her marriage, Cooper gave birth to ten children:

- Robert Bransby Cooper (1762-1845)
- Samuel Lovick Cooper (1763-1817)
- William Howman Cooper (1764-1834)
- Charlotte Maria Anna Inyon Cooper (1765-1786)
- Marianne (Cooper) Spurgeon (c. 1765 -1789)
- Astley Paston Cooper (1768-1841)
- Anna Maria Cooper (1770-1770)
- Margaret Bransby Cooper (1772- c. 1783)
- Beauchamp Newton Cooper (1774-1802)
- Anne Maria Inyon Cooper (1777-1793)

One daughter died in infancy and two others in childhood. A further three children died of tuberculosis between 1786 and 1802. The second child, Samuel Lovick Cooper, became a clergyman. A middle son, Astley Cooper, became a prominent English surgeon and anatomist. Astley Cooper in turn influenced his brother Samuel's son Bransby Blake Cooper to himself become a surgeon.

Cooper's husband Samuel died in 1800. In 1806, Cooper went to live with her eldest son, politician Robert Bransby Cooper, in Dursley, Gloucestershire. She died there on 3 July 1807.

== Writing ==
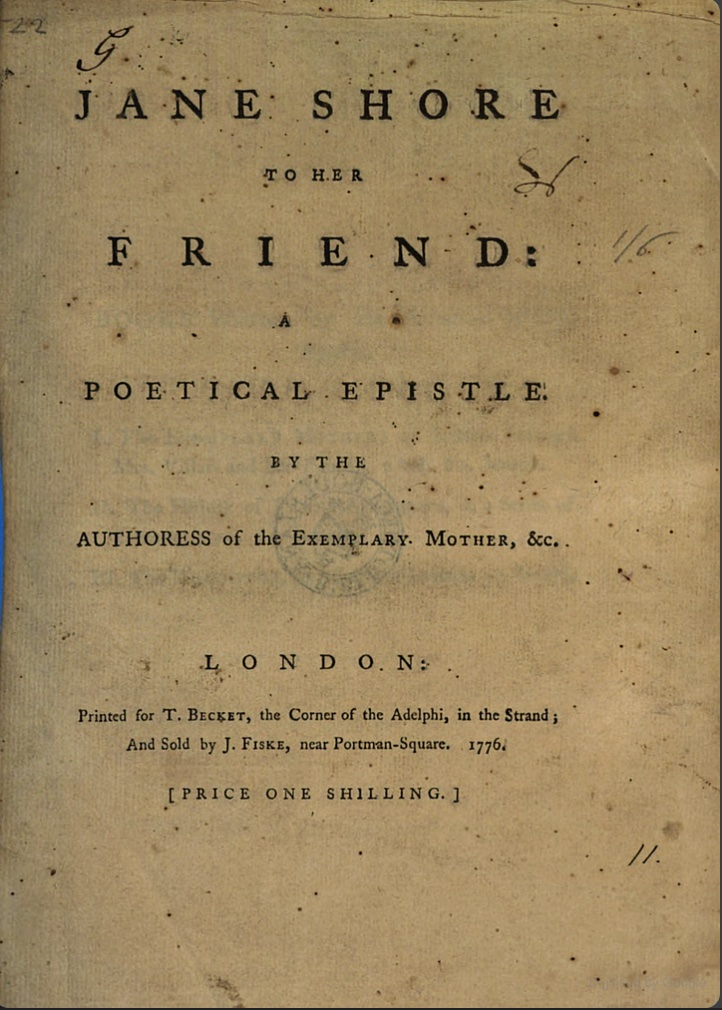
Title page of Maria Susanna Cooper's Jane Shore to her friend: a poetical epistle (London 1776)

Cooper's earliest writing was in the form of children's books published with John Newbery, though details of these publications have been lost.

She is best known for her epistolary novels, beginning with Letters between Emilia and Harriet (1762). Cooper's most famous work, The Exemplary Mother, or Letters between Mrs. Villars and her Family, was published in two volumes in 1769 and republished in a revised second edition in 1784.

While Cooper has been described as "a well-to-do clergyman's wife" rather than as a professional writer or a bluestocking, she did have some degree of connection to a larger literary community. Her name routinely appeared on the subscription lists of works of other novelists, for example, and novelist Elizabeth Bonhote was a longstanding and "valued friend" who dedicated her Darnley Vale to Cooper in 1789.

Cooper published two novels in 1775 — The Daughter (a heavily revised version of Letters between Emilia and Harriet) and The History of Fanny Meadows — followed by Jane Shore to her Friend: A Poetic Epistle the following year. After her death in 1806, her son Robert Cooper, who was his mother's literary executor, reissued her novels in revised editions. He also published two other works: a collection of short pieces previously published in periodicals, Moral Tales (1811), and a novel, The Wife, or, Caroline Herbert (1813).

Cooper's early work was published anonymously, and even after her success, her books were still attributed to "the author of The Exemplary Mother", though she did begin to sign her introductions. The practice of keeping ones authorship an open secret enabled women authors to maintain a reputation for modesty and was not unusual during this period.

In his introduction to his mother's Moral Tales, Robert Bransby Cooper wrote, "The entertainment and instruction of her children, [and] a sense of duty ... were [her] principal motives." Cooper's novels were indeed heavily didactic, but they also attempted to represent genuine portrayals of realistic people.

== Works ==
- Anonymous. Letters between Emilia and Harriet (London and Dublin, 1762).
- Anonymous. The exemplary mother: or, letters between Mrs. Villars and her family. Published by a lady, from the originals in her possession. In two volumes (London and Dublin, 1769; 2nd ed. 1784).
- Anonymous. The daughter: or the history of Miss Emilia Royston, and Miss Harriet Ayres; in a series of letters. By the authoress of The exemplary mother. (London and Dublin, 1775).
- Anonymous. The history of Fanny Meadows. In a series of letters. By the author of The exemplary mother. (London 1775; Dublin 1776).
- Anonymous. Jane Shore to her friend: a poetical epistle. By the authoress of The exemplary mother, &c. (London, 1776).
- Anonymous. The Wife; or, Caroline Herbert. By the late author of the "Exemplary Mother." (London, 1813).

== Etexts ==
- Letters Between Emilia and Harriet (1762) (Full text, Google; Full text, HathiTrust)
- Jane Shore to Her Friend (1776) (Full text, Google)
- The Wife (1813) (PDF, Chawton House)
