= William Bromley-Chester =

British politician

William Bromley-Chester (1738–1780) was a British politician who sat in the House of Commons from 1776 to 1780.

Bromley-Chester was born as Bromley and was baptised on 30 July 1738.. He was the only son of Rev. Francis Bromley, rector of Wickham, Hampshire and his wife Rebecca Gastrell, daughter of Dr. Francis Gastrell, Bishop of Chester. His grandfather William Bromley was Speaker of the House of Commons from 1710 to 1713. Bromley was educated at Westminster School and matriculated at Christ Church, Oxford in 1757. He married Elizabeth Lucy Chester, daughter of Richard Howe Chester of Haseley on 20 April 1765. She inherited the estates of her uncle Thomas Chester in 1763, and Bromley took the additional name of Chester.

Bromley-Chester was returned as Member of Parliament for Gloucestershire at a by-election on 6 May 1776 after a very costly contest. He was supported by the Duke of Beaufort but his expenses were said to be so great that a large sum was still unpaid by January 1780. He was returned unopposed at the 1780 general election.

Bromley-Chester died on 12 December 1780.

Parliament of Great Britain
Preceded by Edward Southwell; Sir William Guise, Bt	Member of Parliament for Gloucestershire; 1776–1780; With: Sir William Guise, Bt	Succeeded by James Dutton; Sir William Guise, Bt
