= Thomas Palmer (died 1582) =

English politician

Thomas Palmer (by 1520 – 1582), of Parham, Sussex, was an English politician.

He was the eldest son of Robert Palmer, merchant of London and Parham, Sussex.

He was a member of parliament (MP) for Arundel in March and October 1553, Sussex in 1554 and Guildford in 1559. He was a justice of the peace for Sussex from 1547 and was appointed High Sheriff of Surrey and Sussex for 1559–60.

He married twice: firstly Griselda or Bridget, the daughter of John Caryll, serjeant-at-law of Warnham, with whom he had 3 daughters and secondly Katherine, the daughter of Sir Edward Stradling of St. Donats, Glamorgan, with whom he had 1 or 2 sons.
