= Augustus Keppel, 5th Earl of Albemarle =

British politician

The Right Honourable The Earl of Albemarle DL

Member of Parliament for Arundel
- In office 8 March 1820 – 2 June 1826
- Preceded by: Lord Henry Howard-Molyneux-Howard
- Succeeded by: Edward Lombe

Personal details
- Born: Augustus Frederick Keppel; 2 June 1794
- Died: 15 March 1851 (aged 56) Chelsea, Middlesex, England
- Party: Whig
- Spouse: Frances Steer (m. 1816)
- Parent: William Keppel, 4th Earl of Albemarle (father)

Military service
- Branch/service: Royal Navy (1809–1811); British Army (1811–1816)
- Years of service: 1809–1816
- Rank: Captain
- Unit: 1st Regiment of Foot Guards
- Battles/wars: Napoleonic Wars; Battle of Waterloo
- Awards: Waterloo Medal

Augustus Frederick Keppel, 5th Earl of Albemarle (2 June 1794 – 15 March 1851), styled Viscount Bury from 1804 until 1849, was a British politician.

== Life ==
Bury was commissioned an ensign in the 1st Regiment of Foot Guards on 7 April 1811. He was promoted to lieutenant and captain on 12 January 1814. In 1815, he was appointed aide-de-camp to William, Prince of Orange and fought at the Battle of Waterloo.

On 4 May 1816, Bury married Frances Steer, but the couple had no children. He sat as member of parliament for Arundel from 1820 to 1826, and was appointed a deputy lieutenant of Norfolk on 13 March 1845.

He succeeded his father as Earl of Albemarle in October 1849, but he was subsequently adjudged to have been insane since July 1849. Accordingly, he never sat in the House of Lords. Upon his death aged 56, in Chelsea, in 1851, he was succeeded by his brother George.

== Arms ==
Coat of arms of Augustus Keppel, 5th Earl of Albemarle
Coronet Coronet of an Earl. Crest Out of a ducal coronet or, a swan's head and neck argent. Escutcheon Gules, three escallops argent. Supporters Two lions ducally crowned or. Motto Ne cede malis (Yield not to adversity)

Parliament of the United Kingdom
Preceded by Lord Henry Thomas Howard-Molyneux-Howard; Robert Blake	Member of Parliament for Arundel; 1820–1826; With: Robert Blake 1820–1823; Thomas Read Kemp 1823–1826	Succeeded by Edward Lombe; John Atkins
Peerage of England
Preceded by William Keppel	Earl of Albemarle; 1849–1851	Succeeded by George Keppel
