= William Chapman (MP for Arundel) =

English politician

William Chapman (fl. 1416) of Arundel, Sussex, was an English politician.

He was a member (MP) of the parliament of England for Arundel in March 1416.
