= George Cranfield Berkeley =

Royal Navy officer and politician (1753–1818)

Admiral The Honourable Sir George Cranfield Berkeley GCB
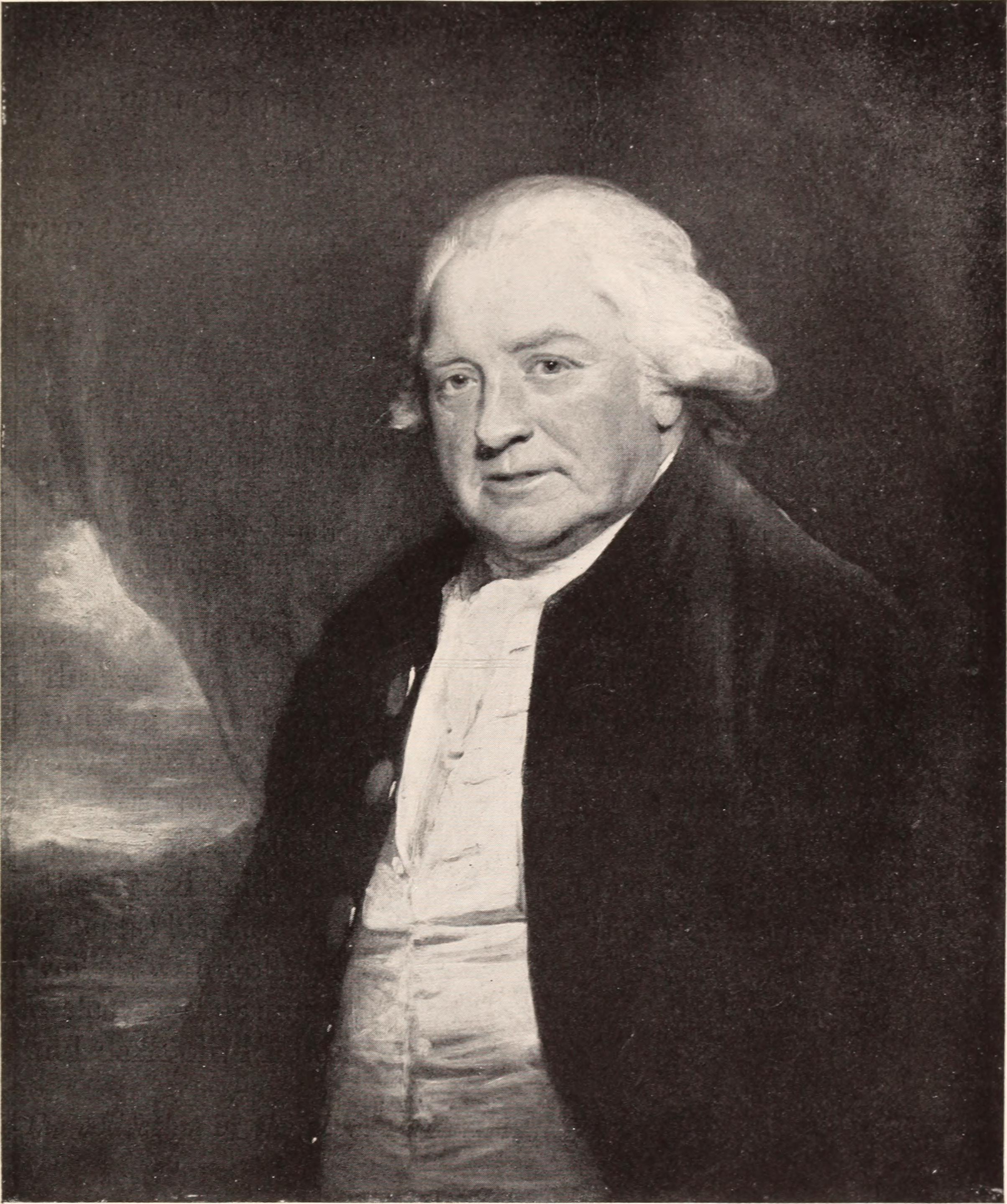
- Portrait by Sir William Beechey
- Born: 10 August 1753
- Died: 25 February 1818 (aged 64); London, England
- Military career
- Allegiance: Great Britain; United Kingdom
- Branch: Royal Navy
- Service years: 1766–1813
- Rank: Admiral
- Commands: Commander-in-Chief, North American Station; Commander-in-Chief, Portugal
- Conflicts: American War of Independence; First Battle of Ushant; Great Siege of Gibraltar; Second Battle of Ushant; French Revolutionary Wars; Glorious First of June; Napoleonic Wars; Peninsular War
- Awards: Knight Grand Cross of the Order of the Bath
- Other work: MP for Gloucestershire, 1783–1810

Admiral Sir George Cranfield Berkeley, GCB (10 August 1753 – 25 February 1818) was a Royal Navy officer and politician who was highly popular yet controversial in late eighteenth and early nineteenth century Britain. Serving on several ships, Berkeley saw action at all three Battles of Ushant, commanded fleets in the West Indies and off Ireland and governed the supply routes to Portugal and Spain which kept Wellington's armies in the field during the Peninsular War. He also enjoyed an extensive political career, reforming military practices in Britain and participating in several prominent scandals including feuds with Charles James Fox and Hugh Palliser.

== Early career ==
George Cranfield Berkeley was born in 1753, the third son of Augustus Berkeley, 4th Earl of Berkeley, and his courtier wife Elizabeth Drax. His father died when George was only two and the title Earl of Berkeley passed to his elder brother Frederick. George was privately educated until nine, when he attended Eton College, gaining a formal education until 1766 when he was attached to the royal yacht Mary, commanded by a relative, Augustus Keppel. Mary conveyed Princess Caroline Matilda to Denmark, where she was married to Christian VII of Denmark. Berkeley acted as page at her wedding.

In 1767, Berkeley was attached to the squadron under Hugh Palliser based at Newfoundland. Berkeley was there mentored by Joseph Gilbert (who later accompanied James Cook) and John Cartwright (later a prominent political reformer). With these men, Berkeley participated in a survey of Newfoundland, learning seamanship, surveying and numerous other skills in the two-year commission. In 1769, Berkeley was transferred to the Mediterranean and served in the frigate HMS Alarm under John Jervis. For the next five years, Berkeley spent time in the Mediterranean and at home, making lieutenant in 1772 but failing to be elected as MP for Cricklade and then Gloucestershire after a bitter and enormously expensive contest.

== American Revolutionary War ==
Following the outbreak of the American Revolutionary War, Berkeley served on HMS Victory, in which he commanded a gundeck at the First Battle of Ushant. Berkeley became a prominent opponent of Sir Hugh Palliser after the battle, at which Palliser was accused of refusing to obey the orders of his commanding officer, Admiral Augustus Keppel. This opposition did not prevent Berkeley gaining his first independent command the same year, when he took over the 8-gun HMS Pluto. The next year he moved to the similarly tiny HMS Firebrand and impressed his commanding officer Lord Shuldham. Shuldham's recommendation for promotion was turned down however due to his previous involvement in the Palliser affair.

In 1780, Berkeley was appointed to HMS Fairy, a 14-gun brig under his cousin George Keppel and together they captured the American ship Mercury, taking prisoner Henry Laurens who was on a secret mission to loan money from the Dutch government. The information procured from Laurens led to a British declaration of war against the Netherlands. As another consequence, Berkeley was promoted to captain by Admiral Richard Edwards and commanded Fairy during the relief of the Great Siege of Gibraltar and further operations against American shipping from Newfoundland.

In 1781, Berkeley was given command of the frigate HMS Recovery which was placed in the squadron of Samuel Barrington. At the Second Battle of Ushant in 1782, Berkeley's ship was engaged in the decimation of a French convoy and its escorts. As a reward, Berkeley was given the captured ship of the line HMS Pegase. Whilst aboard her he was approached by a young William Cobbett who wanted to volunteer for the navy. Berkeley dissuaded Cobbett, who later credited Berkeley with saving him from "most toilsome and perilous profession in the world". In April 1783, Berkeley finally gained a seat in parliament, at the constituency of Gloucestershire. Berkeley would remain MP for the town for the next 27 years and took the position seriously, becoming a very important independent MP. He even attempted to bring William Pitt the Younger and Charles James Fox into an alliance, although the collapse of the scheme ended with a feud between him and Fox.

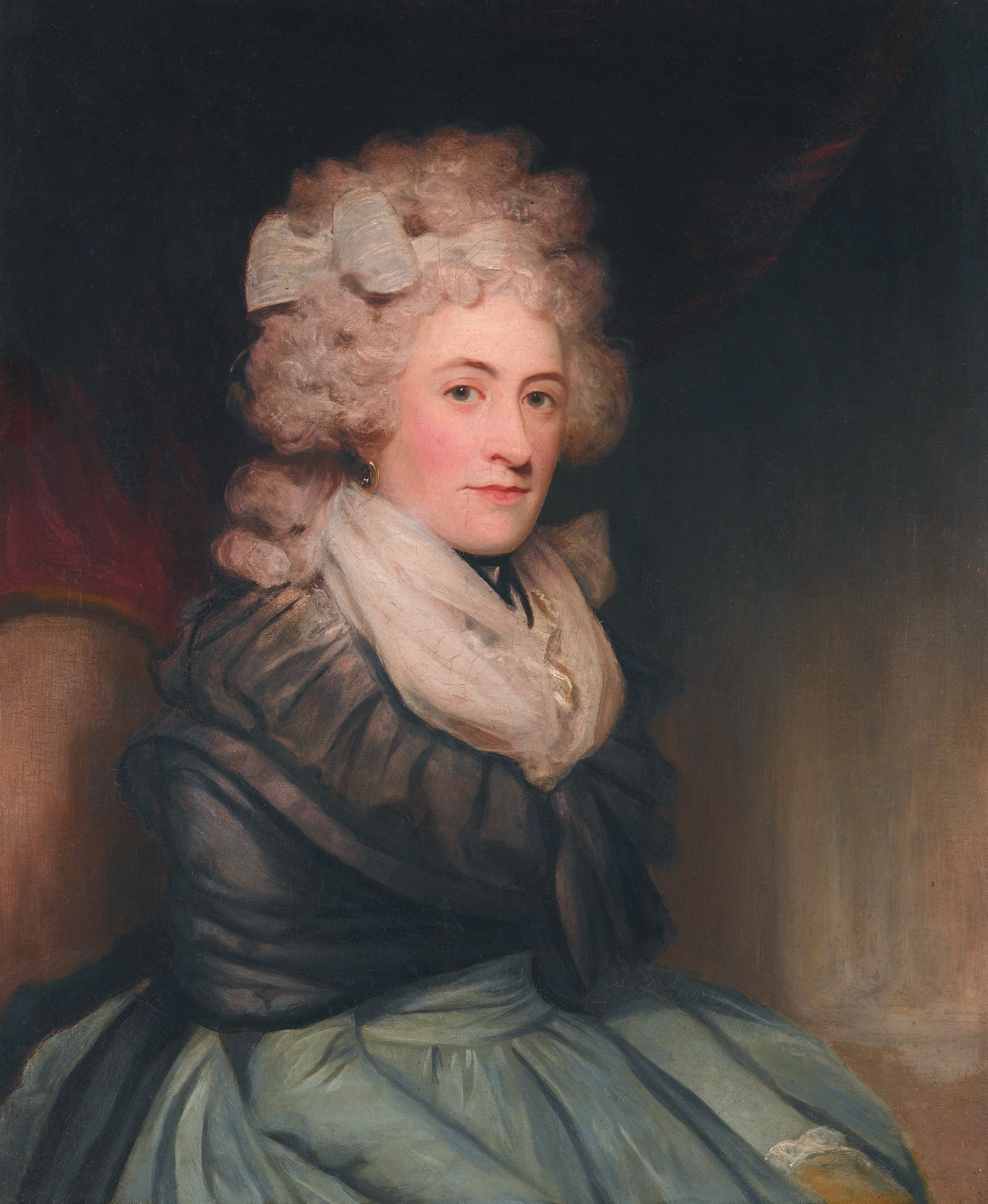
Emilia Charlotte Lennox (John Hoppner)

The following year, 1784 after the peace, Berkeley married Emilia Charlotte Lennox, daughter of Lord George Lennox. The marriage was a love match and Berkeley's sister commented that they were "a pattern of domestic happiness scarcely to be equaled". The couple had three daughters and two sons and remained an unusually tight-knit family, Berkeley using his extensive personal wealth to bring his family with him on long voyages and overseas postings. In 1786 Berkeley commanded HMS Magnificent and remained with her for three years until 1789 when he became surveyor-general of the ordnance. He left the post after the French Revolutionary Wars broke out in 1793, taking over HMS Marlborough.

== French Revolutionary Wars ==
Berkeley was still in command of Marlborough when she fought under Lord Howe at the Glorious First of June, fighting as part of Admiral Thomas Pasley's van division there and at the preceding Atlantic campaign of May 1794. At the First of June, Marlborough was dismasted in close combat with several French ships and Berkeley badly wounded in the head and thigh, having to retire below after a period to staunch the bleeding. He had a long convalescence after the action but was amongst the captains selected for the gold medal commemorating the action, only awarded to those felt to have played a significant part in the victory.

Returning to service in 1795, Berkeley commanded HMS Formidable off Brest, Cádiz, Ireland and the Texel, coming ashore in 1798 to command the Sussex sea fencibles. In 1799, Berkeley was promoted rear-admiral and attached to the Channel Fleet, but the gout which had forced his first retirement returned, and Berkeley was forced to take permanent shore leave in 1800. In 1801, Berkeley increased his political interests to compensate for the loss of his naval career.

== Napoleonic Wars ==
Berkeley continued building his political status during the Peace of Amiens and by Berkeley had been appointed inspector of sea fencibles, a job he undertook with vigour, conducting a fourteen-month survey of Britain's coastal defences, which greatly improved the island's defences. In 1806, after a shift in political power, Berkeley fell out of favour somewhat and was dispatched to the North American Station. From there, Berkeley ordered the attack by HMS Leopard on the American frigate USS Chesapeake in retaliation for American recruitment of British deserters. This action, known as the Chesapeake-Leopard Affair, helped precipitate the War of 1812.

Having embarrassed the British government with this action, Berkeley was recalled home. However, public opinion supported his orders, so Berkeley was moved to command in Lisbon in the hope he could organise the chaotic supply system for Wellington's army in the Peninsular War. Berkeley recognised that only a dedicated and organised convoy system could keep the supply of men, food and material regular and consequently set one up. Simultaneously, he reequipped and galvanised the remnants of the Spanish Navy, rescuing several ships from capture by the French as well as used frigates to supply partisan units all along the coast of Portugal and Northern Spain.

By 1810, Wellington could truthfully say of Berkeley that "His activity is unbounded, the whole range of the business of the Country in which he is stationed, civil, military, political, commercial, even ecclesiastical I believe as well as naval are objects of his attention". He was promoted to full admiral and made Lord High Admiral of the Portuguese Navy by the Portuguese Regent in Brazil.

Berkeley retired from the post in 1812, again laid low by health. He and Wellington remained good friends for the rest of their lives, and Wellington later stated that Berkeley was the best naval commander he had ever cooperated with. Berkeley's final voyage was to return to Britain aboard HMS Barfleur. Later rewards included being made a Knight Companion of the Order of the Bath in 1813 which was converted to a Knight Grand Cross of the Order of the Bath in 1815. He was reportedly disappointed not to have been given a peerage for his long and excellent service.

== Retirement and family ==
Berkeley retired to a house in South Audley Street, London, where his gout continued to plague him with severe pain for the rest of his life. He spent some time during this period conversing with lifelong friend Edward Jenner, whose vaccine for smallpox Berkeley had persuaded the government to investigate, particularly with regard for the health of the navy. He was confined to bed as a result of chronic gout, and died in February 1818 at the age of 64, survived by his family.

=== Family ===
Berkeley had a total of five children.

1. Sir George Berkeley was a general and father of the 7th Earl of Berkeley.
2. Louisa Emily Anne Berkeley married firstly Sir Thomas Hardy, 1st Baronet, on 17 November 1807. They had three daughters. She married secondly Charles Ellis, 1st Baron Seaford, although no children were born of this union.
3. Georgiana Mary Berkeley married Admiral of the Fleet Sir George Francis Seymour. They had three sons and four daughters.
4. Mary Caroline Berkeley (d. 1873) married Henry Fitzroy, 5th Duke of Grafton.
5. Grenville Berkeley was a politician.

== Notes ==
Parliament of Great Britain
Preceded by James Dutton; Sir William Guise, Bt	Member of Parliament for Gloucestershire; 1783–1801; With: James Dutton, to 1784; Thomas Master, 1784–1796; Henry Somerset, 1796–1801	Succeeded by Parliament of the United Kingdom
Parliament of the United Kingdom
Preceded by Parliament of Great Britain	Member of Parliament for Gloucestershire; 1801–1810; With: Henry Somerset, 1801–1803; Lord Edward Somerset, 1803–1810	Succeeded by Lord Edward Somerset; William Berkeley
Military offices
Preceded by Hon. James Luttrell	Surveyor-General of the Ordnance; 1789–1795	Succeeded by Alexander Ross
Preceded by Sir Andrew Mitchell	Commander-in-Chief, North American Station; 1806–1807	Succeeded by Sir John Warren
