= William Keppel, 4th Earl of Albemarle =

British politician and courtier

The Right Honourable The Earl of Albemarle GCH PC
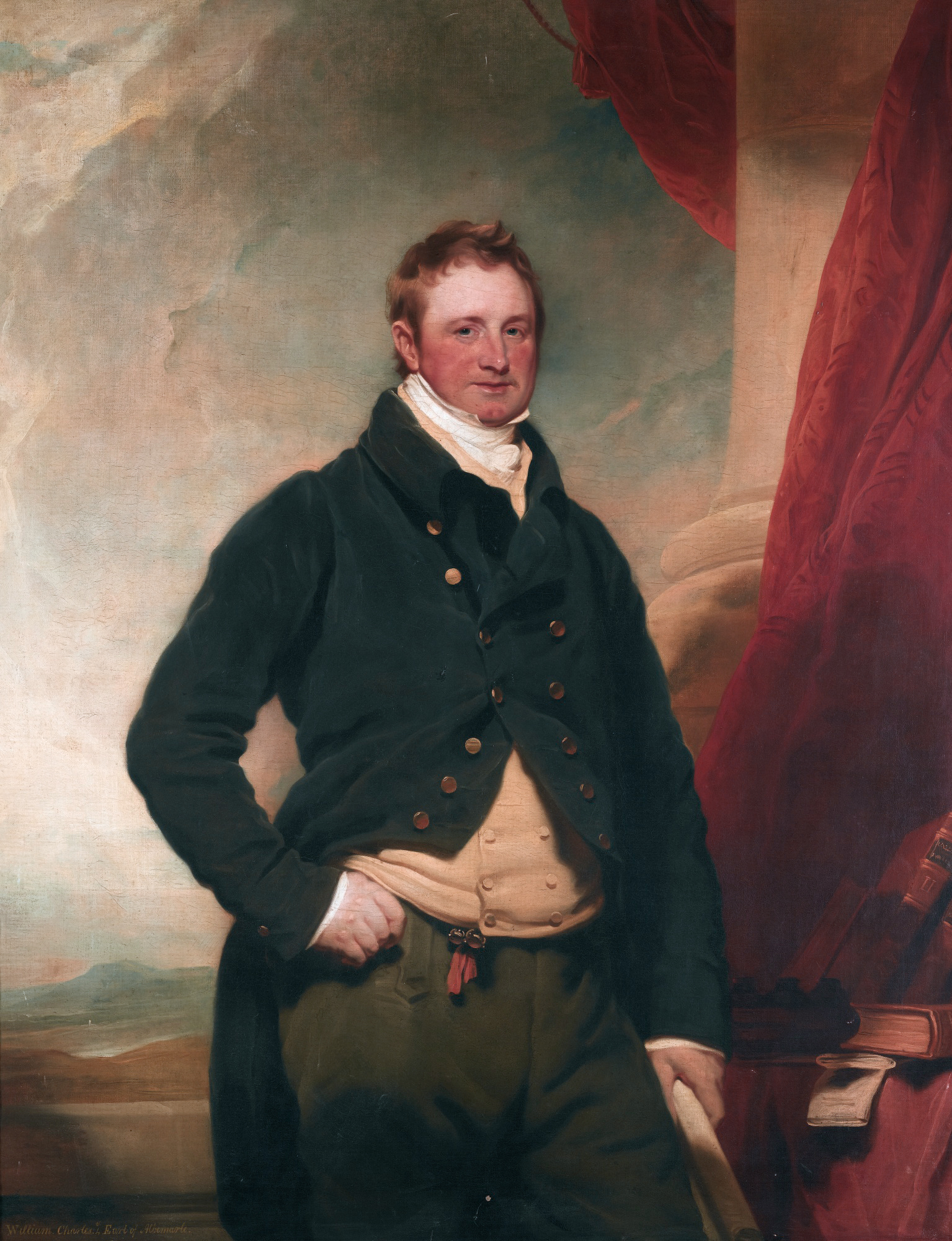
- Portrait of Keppel by Martin Archer Shee

Master of the Buckhounds
- In office 12 February 1806 – 31 March 1807
- Monarch: George III
- Prime Minister: The Lord Grenville
- Preceded by: The Earl of Sandwich
- Succeeded by: The Marquess Cornwallis

Master of the Horse
- In office 24 November 1830 – 14 November 1834
- Monarch: William IV
- Prime Minister: The Earl Grey; The Viscount Melbourne
- Preceded by: The Duke of Leeds
- Succeeded by: The Duke of Dorset
- In office 25 April 1835 – 30 August 1841
- Monarchs: William IV; Queen Victoria
- Prime Minister: The Viscount Melbourne
- Preceded by: The Duke of Dorset
- Succeeded by: The Earl of Jersey

Personal details
- Born: 14 May 1772 William Charles Keppel
- Died: 30 October 1849 (aged 77) Quidenham, Norfolk
- Party: Whig
- Spouses: Elizabeth Southwell (m. 1792; died 1817); Charlotte Hunloke (m. 1822)
- Children: 11, including Augustus, George and Henry
- Parents: George Keppel, 3rd Earl of Albemarle; Anne Miller

William Charles Keppel, 4th Earl of Albemarle, GCH, PC (14 May 1772 – 30 October 1849), styled Viscount Bury from May to October 1772, was a British Whig politician and courtier.

== Background ==
Albemarle was the only child of General George Keppel, 3rd Earl of Albemarle, and Anne, daughter of Sir John Miller, 4th Baronet. He succeeded in the earldom in October 1772, aged five months, on the early death of his father. He was educated at St John's College, Cambridge.

== Political career ==
On the formation of the Ministry of All the Talents in 1806, Lord Albemarle was appointed Master of the Buckhounds by Lord Grenville. Thereby he became an officer in the Master of the Horse's department in the Royal Household and also the equivalent of today's Representative of Her Majesty at Ascot. The Mastership of the Buckhounds being a political office, the holder changed with every government and because the Earl's patrons fell in March 1807 he lost his position after only one year. He remained out of office until 1830 when he was sworn of the Privy Council and made Master of the Horse by Lord Grey, which was the third-ranking officer at court (after the Lord Chamberlain and Lord Steward). He continued in this office until November 1834, the last few months under the premiership of Lord Melbourne, and held the same post under Melbourne between 1835 and 1841. Consequently, he was responsible for managing all matters equine at the changeover from one reign to the next and, in particular, at Queen Victoria's Coronation. The Earl was accorded the honour of travelling to Westminster Abbey inside the Gold State Coach with the nineteen-year-old, and as yet unmarried Victoria, who recorded in her diary: "At 10 I got into the State Coach with the Duchess of Sutherland and Lord Albemarle...It was a fine day, and the crowds of people exceeded what I have ever seen; their good humour and excessive loyalty was beyond everything, and I really cannot say how proud I feel to be the Queen of such a nation".

== As horseman and racehorse owner ==
In addition to managing the bloodstock of two successive heads of state, when the horse was still a main mode of transport, Lord Albemarle was also a leading racehorse owner of his day. As an owner, William Charles won two Classics (the 1000 Guineas in 1838 with Barcarolle and the 2000 Guineas in 1841), and the Ascot Gold Cup three times (with two different horses) in 1843, 1844, and 1845. The second Gold Cup win, in 1844, was by a colt which the Earl had not yet named. One of the witnesses of this triumph, Tsar Nicholas I of Russia, let William Charles know how excited he had been by the race, and the Earl promptly named his horse "The Emperor" in honour of the distinguished Russian visitor. In 1845, when "The Emperor" won the Gold Cup (now renamed The Emperor's Plate) again the Earl received a massive silver centrepiece paid for by the Tsar as the race prize based on Falconet's well-known sculpture of Peter the Great in St Petersburg, the base flanked by Russian equestrian troops. William Charles's horses were also victorious in the 1840s in the Cesarevitch and Cambridgeshire major handicaps run at Newmarket. (Source for the above two paragraphs is The Newsletter of the Keppel Association, Issue 4, August 2011)

In 1833 he was made a Knight Grand Cross of the Hanoverian Order.

== Family ==
Lord Albemarle married, firstly, the Hon. Elizabeth Southwell, daughter of Edward Southwell, 20th Baron de Clifford, on 9 April 1792. They had at least twelve children:

- William Keppel, Viscount Bury (1793–1804), died young.
- Augustus Frederick Keppel, 5th Earl of Albemarle (1794–1851), who married Frances Steer. No issue.
- Lady Sophia Keppel (c. 1798 – 1824), married Sir James Macdonald, 2nd Baronet, and had issue.
- George Thomas Keppel, 6th Earl of Albemarle (1799–1891), through whom is descended Queen Camilla.
- Reverend Hon. Edward Southwell Keppel (1800–1883), Dean of Norwich, married Lady Maria, daughter of Nathaniel Clements, 2nd Earl of Leitrim.
- Lady Anne Amelia Keppel (1803–1844), married Thomas Coke, 1st Earl of Leicester, through whom is descended Sarah Ferguson and Jack Brooksbank, husband of her daughter Princess Eugenie; married, secondly, Edward Ellice.
- Lady Mary Keppel (1804–1898), married Henry Frederick Stephenson, MP, and had issue.
- Lady Georgiana Charlotte (1806–1854), married William Henry Magan.
- Admiral Hon. Sir Henry Keppel (1809–1904), married Katherine Crosby and had issue.
- Reverend Hon. Thomas Robert Keppel (1811–1863), married Frances Barrett-Lennard, daughter of Sir Thomas Barrett-Lennard, 1st Baronet, and had issue.
- Lady Caroline Elizabeth Keppel (1814–1898), married the Very Reverend Thomas Garnier and had issue.
- John Russell Keppel (1815–1823), died young.

After his first wife's death in November 1817, aged 41, Lord Albemarle married, secondly, Charlotte Susannah, daughter of Sir Henry Hunloke, 4th Baronet, on 11 February 1822. This marriage was childless. He died at Quidenham, Norfolk, in October 1849, aged 77, and was succeeded in the earldom by his second but eldest surviving son, Augustus.

The Dowager Countess, Charlotte Susannah, was nicknamed the "Rowdy Dow" by her stepchildren, who accused her of squandering the family's fortune. In the words of one biographer: "[She] managed to disperse Keppel heirlooms with extravagant eccentricity." The Dowager Countess of Albemarle died at Twickenham, London, in October 1862, aged 88.

== Arms ==
Coat of arms of William Keppel, 4th Earl of Albemarle
Coronet Coronet of an Earl. Crest Out of a ducal coronet or, a swan's head and neck argent. Escutcheon Gules, three escallops argent. Supporters Two lions ducally crowned or. Motto Ne cede malis (Yield not to adversity)

Political offices
Preceded by The Earl of Sandwich	Master of the Buckhounds; 1806	Succeeded by The Marquess Cornwallis
Preceded by The Duke of Leeds	Master of the Horse; 1830–1834	Succeeded by The Duke of Dorset
Preceded by The Duke of Dorset	Master of the Horse; 1835–1841	Succeeded by The Earl of Jersey
Peerage of England
Preceded by George Keppel	Earl of Albemarle; 1772–1849	Succeeded by Augustus Keppel
