= Roger Clerk =

Roger Clerk (fl. 1388), was an English Member of Parliament (MP).

Clerk was a Member of the Parliament of England for Arundel in February 1388.
