= Sir William Guise, 5th Baronet =

British politician

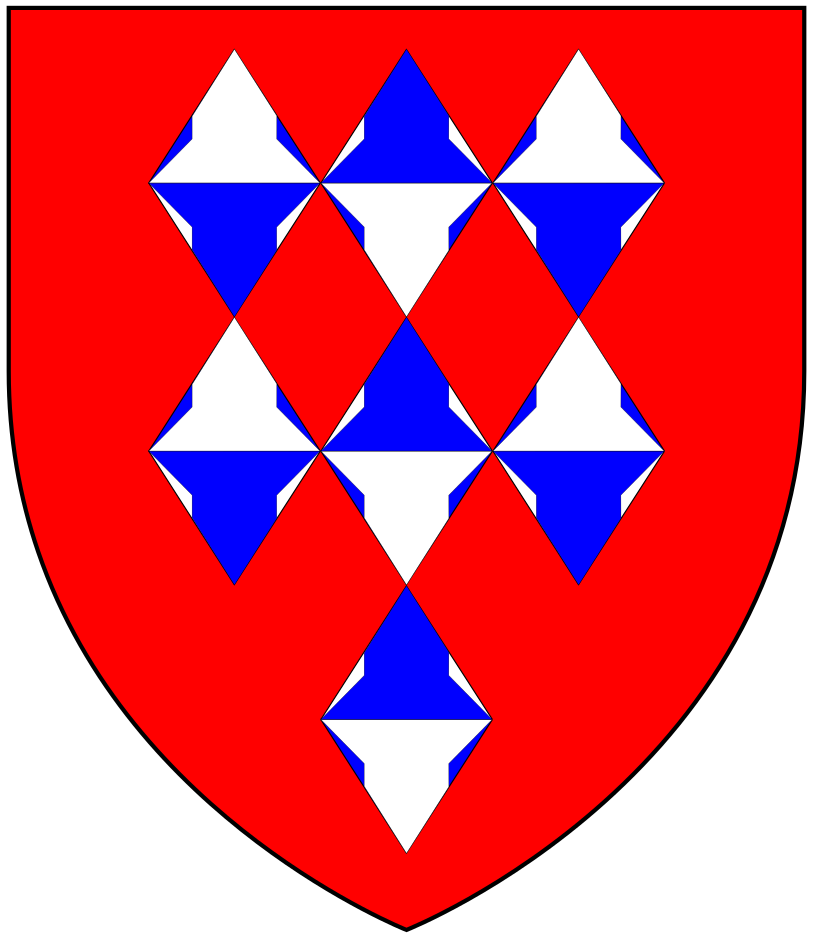
Arms of Guise: Gules, seven lozenges conjoined vairé three, three and one

Sir William Guise, 5th Baronet (1737 – 6 April 1783), was a British politician who accompanied Edward Gibbon on his Grand Tour of Italy and sat in the House of Commons between 1770 and 1783.

Guise was the son of Sir John Guise, 4th Baronet of Elmore Court and Rendcombe, Gloucestershire and his wife Jane Saunders, daughter of John Saunders of Mongewell, Oxfordshire. He entered Lincoln's Inn and Queen's College, Oxford in 1754 and was awarded MA on 29 October 1759. Between 1763 and 1765 he undertook the Grand Tour when he met Edward Gibbon at Lausanne and accompanied him to Italy “in great harmony and good humour”. He succeeded his father in the baronetcy in 1769.

In August 1770 Guise was returned unopposed as Member of Parliament for Gloucestershire and held the seat until his death. He is reported to have spoken only twice in Parliament.

Guise was unmarried and the baronetcy became extinct on his death on 6 April 1783. His estates were inherited by a relative John Guise of Highnam, who was created the first Guise baronet, of Highnam the same year.

Parliament of Great Britain
| Preceded by Edward Southwell; Thomas Tracy | Member of Parliament for Gloucestershire; 1770–1783; With: Edward Southwell 1770-1776; William Bromley-Chester 1776-1781; James Dutton 1781-1783 | Succeeded by James Dutton; Hon. George Cranfield Berkeley |
Baronetage of England
| Preceded by John Guise | Baronet (of Elmore Court and Rendcombe); 1769–1783 | Extinct |
