= Nisbet Balfour =

British soldier in the Revolutionary War

General Nisbet Balfour

Member of Parliament for Wigtown Burghs
- In office 1790–1796

Member of Parliament for Arundel
- In office 1897–1802

Personal details
- Born: 1744
- Died: 16 October 1823 (Aged 79–80)

Military service
- Allegiance: Great Britain
- Unit: 4th Regiment of Foot; 23rd Regiment of Foot; 93rd Foot; 39th Foot
- Commands: 23rd Regiment of Foot; 93rd Foot; 39th Foot
- Battles/wars: American Revolutionary War; War of the First Coalition

General Nisbet Balfour (1744, Dunbog—16 October 1823, Dunbog) was a British soldier in the American Revolutionary War and later a Scottish Member of Parliament (MP) in the British Parliament.

He was born in Dunbog, in the county of Fife, Scotland in 1744, son of Henry Balfour. Joining the 4th Regiment of Foot as ensign in 1761, he rose to become one of Cornwallis' most trusted officers during the American Revolution. He fought and was severely injured in the Battle of Bunker Hill (Breed's Hill) and also participated in battles in Elizabethtown, Brandywine, and Germantown, and was made Lieutenant-Colonel (of the 23rd Regiment of Foot) in 1778. He accompanied Cornwallis to Charleston where he was sometimes commandant. He was promoted to major general in 1793, Colonel of both the 93rd Regiment of Foot (1793) (an earlier regiment than the Sutherland Highlanders raised in 1799) and the 39th Foot in 1794 and served in the war with France.

He was elected to Parliament in 1790 as the MP for Wigtown Burghs, sitting until 1796 and again in 1797 for Arundel, sitting until 1802.

He died on 16 October 1823 in Dunbog, Scotland.

== Family ==
Descendants and kin include the Stewarts of St Fort, Fife, Scotland, as well as John Stewart of Urrard, son of Robert Stewart of Fincastle and the Athol Stewarts. Elizabeth Mure of Rowallan. Reference is made in the 1842, 1853, and 1863 editions of Sir Bernard Burke's A Genealogical and Heraldic Dictionary of the Landed Gentry of Great Britain, Volume 2. In the 1863 edition on page 1437 mentions one William Campbell and states that he assumed the additional surnames of Stewart and Balfour to conform with the terms of the will of his maternal uncle, Lieut. General Nisbet Balfour.

Parliament of Great Britain
| Preceded by William Dalrymple | Member of Parliament for Wigtown Burghs; 1790–1796 | Succeeded by John Spalding |
| Preceded by Sir George Thomas, Bt | Member of Parliament for Arundel; 1797–1800 | Succeeded by Parliament of the United Kingdom |
Parliament of the United Kingdom
| Preceded by Parliament of Great Britain | Member of Parliament for Arundel; 1801–1802 | Succeeded by Viscount Andover |
Military offices
| Preceded by Sir Robert Boyd | Colonel of 39th (Dorsetshire) Regiment of Foot; 1794–1823 | Succeeded by Sir George Airey |
