= James Dutton, 1st Baron Sherborne =

British peer

James Naper Dutton, 1st Baron Sherborne

Arms of Dutton: Quarterly argent and gules, in the second and third quarters a fret or

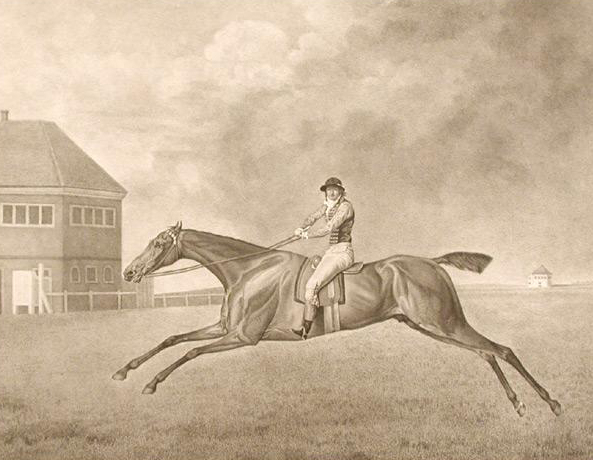
Baronet, foundation sire bred by James Dutton, painting by George Stubbs

James Naper Dutton, 1st Baron Sherborne (22 October 1744 – 22 May 1820), was a British peer.

== Background ==
Sherborne was the son of James Lenox Dutton (originally James Lenox Naper), of Sherborne, Gloucestershire, by his second wife Jane, daughter of Christopher Bond. He was educated at Eton College (1755–1762) and Christ Church, Oxford (1763).

== Political career ==
He was appointed High Sheriff of Gloucestershire for 1779–80 and was elected Member of Parliament for Gloucestershire in 1780, a seat he held until 1784. The latter year he was raised to the peerage as Lord Sherborne, Baron of Sherborne, in the County of Gloucester.

== Investments ==
In 1809 he became the major investor of the Gloucester and Cheltenham Railway Company, subscribing £10,000 of the £26,000 capital.

== Family ==
Lord Sherborne married Elizabeth, daughter of Wenman Coke and sister of the future Earl of Leicester, in 1774. They had four children:

- Elizabeth Jane Dutton (1775–1836), married Thomas Howard, 16th Earl of Suffolk.
- Anne Margaret Dutton (1776–1852)
- Frances Mary Dutton (1778–1807), married Prince Ivan Ivanovitch Bariatinski of Russia (1772–1825)., Russian Minister to the Court of Bavaria.
- John Dutton, 2nd Baron Sherborne (1779–1862), married Mary Bilson Legge (1780–1864), daughter of Henry Bilson Legge, 2nd Baron Stawell (1757–1820).

Lord Sherborne died in May 1820, aged 75, and was succeeded in the barony by his son, John. Lady Sherborne died in December 1824.

== Obituary ==
His obituary, from the July - December 1820 New Monthly Magazine and Universal Register states:

Never within the memory of man has death swept with a more devastating and unsparing hand amongst the noble houses of our land, than within the last two years - the rich and powerful have been humbled amidst the very plenitude of earthly enjoyment, and silently laid in a lowly place of rest...But amidst them all, there is none whose death will be more truly lamented than that of Lord Sherborne. This mournful event took place on Monday evening, May 22, at eight o'clock. His lordship had been seriously indisposed for some time past, but, we believe, no idea of immediate danger was entertained. Distinguished through a long and honourable life by the exercise of every generous and noble quality that could adorn the heart of man, Lord Sherborne enjoyed, in unbounded good will, the respect, the esteem and the affectionate regard of all to whom the many excellent traits of his nature were known. Possessing an extensive property, his first pride was the character with which the gratitude of his tenantry invested him; and to be known as "a good landlord" was to him the chief gratification derived from his possessions. When the honours of this world have passed away, and are forgotten, the record of his Christian zeal, of his piety, and of his benevolence, will be greeted with a sacred enthusiasm, and a mournful reverence inseparable from the memory of his worth.

Parliament of Great Britain
Preceded by Sir William Guise, Bt; William Bromley-Chester	Member of Parliament for Gloucestershire; 1780–1784; With: Sir William Guise, Bt 1780–1783; George Cranfield Berkeley 1783–1784	Succeeded by George Cranfield Berkeley; Thomas Master
Peerage of Great Britain
New creation	Baron Sherborne; 1784–1820	Succeeded by John Baron Dutton
