= George Keppel, 6th Earl of Albemarle =

British soldier, Liberal politician and writer

General The Right Honourable The Earl of Albemarle DL FGS FSA
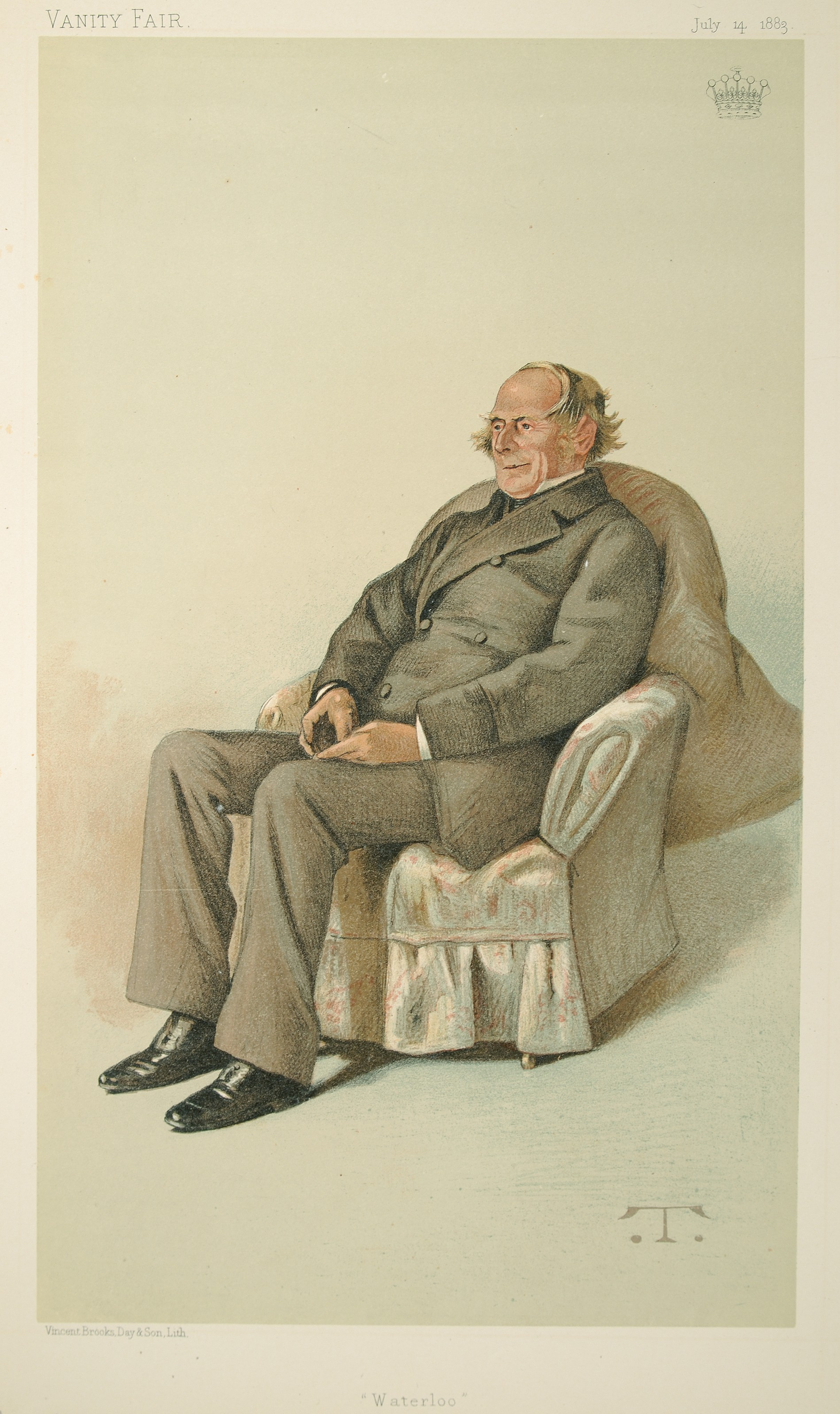
- Albemarle caricatured in Vanity Fair, 1883
- Born: 13 June 1799; Marylebone, London
- Died: 21 February 1891 (aged 91); Portman Square, London
- Burial place: Quidenham, Norfolk
- Education: Westminster School
- Spouse: Susan Trotter
- Children: 5
- Relatives: William Keppel, 4th Earl of Albemarle (Father)
- Military career
- Allegiance: United Kingdom
- Branch: British Army
- Service years: 1815–1891
- Rank: General
- Conflicts: Napoleonic Wars; Battle of Waterloo

General George Thomas Keppel, 6th Earl of Albemarle, DL, FGS, FSA (13 June 1799 – 21 February 1891), styled The Honourable from birth until 1851, was a British soldier, Liberal politician and writer.

== Background and education ==
Born in Marylebone, he was the third and second surviving son of William Keppel, 4th Earl of Albemarle, and his first wife Elizabeth, fourth daughter of Edward Southwell, 20th Baron de Clifford. In 1851, he succeeded his older brother Augustus as earl. His lifelong friend was Sir Robert Adair. Keppel spent his childhood at his father's residence Elden Hall and was educated at Westminster School. In 1815, he entered the British Army as an ensign.

He owned 9,800 acres in Norfolk and Leitrim.

== Military career ==
Keppel fought with the 14th Regiment of Foot in the Battle of Waterloo. He joined the second battalion in Corfu, and was transferred to the 22nd Foot, with which he served in Mauritius and at the Cape of Good Hope, returning home in 1819. Keppel was transferred as lieutenant to the 20th Regiment of Foot in 1820 and went to India, where he was aide-de-camp to the Governor-General Marquess of Hastings until his resignation in 1823, when Keppel returned to England, travelling overland through Persia, Moscow and Saint Petersburg.

Keppel was aide-de-camp to the Marquess Wellesley, Lord Lieutenant of Ireland, for two years, and was promoted captain in the 62nd Foot in 1825. He then studied in the senior department of the Royal Military College, Sandhurst, and in 1827 obtained a half-pay unattached majority. In 1829 he visited the seat of the Russo-Turkish war and was with the British fleet in Turkish waters. He did not again serve on full pay but continued to rise in rank. By 1841 he became major and lieutenant-colonel, and was promoted to colonel in 1854 and to major-general in 1858. He was made lieutenant-general in 1866 and finally general in 1874.

== Political career ==
Keppel represented East Norfolk in the Whig interest in the British House of Commons from 1832 until three years later. He stood unsuccessfully for King's Lynn in 1837 and for Lymington in 1841, however, sat for the latter eventually from 1847 to 1850, before succeeding his brother in the Earldom.

In 1820, he was appointed Equerry to Prince Augustus Frederick, Duke of Sussex. In 1838, he was appointed High Sheriff of Leitrim. He served as Groom-in-Waiting between the latter year and 1841 and was private secretary to the prime minister Lord John Russell between 1846 and the next year. He was a deputy lieutenant of Norfolk from 1859 and was Fellow of the Geological Society (FGS) as well as the Society of Antiquaries of London (FSA).

== Family and death ==
On 4 August 1831, he married Susan Trotter, daughter of Sir Coutts Trotter, 1st Baronet in Willesden. They had four daughters and one son. Keppel died, aged 91 in Portman Square in London and was buried in Quidenham.

He was succeeded in his titles by his only son William, a great-great-grandfather of Queen Camilla.

== Arms ==
Coat of arms of George Keppel, 6th Earl of Albemarle
Coronet Coronet of an Earl. Crest Out of a ducal coronet or, a swan's head and neck argent. Escutcheon Gules, three escallops argent. Supporters Two lions ducally crowned or. Motto Ne cede malis (Yield not to adversity)

== Works ==
- Personal Narrative of a Journey from India to England (1827)
- Personal Narrative of Travels in Babylonia, Assyria, Media and Scythia (1827)
- Narrative of a Journey across the Balcan (1831)
- Memoirs of the Marquess of Rockingham and his Contemporaries (1852)
- Fifty Years of My Life (1876)

Parliament of the United Kingdom
New constituency	Member of Parliament for East Norfolk; 1832–1835; With: William Windham	Succeeded by Lord Walpole; Edmond Wodehouse
Preceded by William Alexander Mackinnon; John Stewart	Member of Parliament for Lymington; 1847–1850; With: William Alexander Mackinnon	Succeeded by William Alexander Mackinnon; Edward John Hutchins
Peerage of England
Preceded by Augustus Keppel	Earl of Albemarle; 1851–1891	Succeeded by William Keppel
Preceded by Augustus Keppel	Baron Ashford (descended by acceleration); 1851–1876	Succeeded by William Keppel
