= Arthur Piggott =

English lawyer and politician (1749–1819)

Sir Arthur Leary Piggott
- Born: 19 October 1749; Saint Michael, Barbados
- Died: 6 September 1819; Eastbourne, Sussex, England
- Education: Trinity College, Oxford
- Occupations: Lawyer and politician
- Political party: Whig
- Spouse(s): Jane Dunnington of Manchester, Lancashire

Sir Arthur Leary Piggott (19 October 1749 – 6 September 1819) was an English lawyer and politician.

He was born in the parish of Saint Michael, Barbados on 19 October 1749, the son of John Piggott of Grenada, and trained for the law at the Middle Temple, being called to the Bar in 1777. He then entered Trinity College, Oxford.

He began his legal career in Grenada, where he was appointed Attorney-General, returning to England in 1783, where after building up a practice as a common lawyer, he moved to the court of Chancery. He was Solicitor-General to the Prince of Wales from 1783 to 1792, when he was discharged because of his membership of the Society of the Friends of the People, a radical reform group. He was elected a Fellow of the Royal Society in 1787.

Under the Whig administration of 1806, he was selected to be Attorney-General, was knighted by the king and given a safe parliamentary seat by the Duke of Norfolk at Steyning. In the 1806 general election, the Duke found him a seat at Arundel, which he held until 1812. In 1812, he was returned for Horsham, sitting until 1818. In that year, he was again provided with the Arundel seat but died the following year and was replaced by Robert Blake.

Although he did not appear in court, he was involved in the 1812 trial of William Booth for forgery, in his role as "constant Counsel for the Bank of England". Booth was sentenced to hang.

Piggott died in Eastbourne, Sussex on 9 September 1819. He had married Jane Dunnington of Manchester, Lancashire.
