= Richard Bowyer (MP) =

English politician (died 1550s)

Richard Bowyer (by 1527 – 1558/59), of Arundel, Sussex, was an English politician.

He was a member (MP) of the parliament of England for Arundel in November 1554.
