= James Greene (MP) =

English politician and Member of Parliament

MP for Arundel
- In office 1796–1802

Personal details
- Born: 7 April 1759 (baptised)
- Died: 16 February 1814 (aged 54) England
- Party: Whig

James Greene (7 April 1759 – 15 February 1814) was an English politician who was Member of Parliament for Arundel in the first Parliament of the United Kingdom.

Described as being of Turton Tower in Lancashire and Llansantffraed, Monmouthshire, Greene was the son of Mordecai Greene, a Spanish merchant of Mortlake and Bathford Place.

== See also ==
- List of MPs in the first United Kingdom Parliament
