= Richard Marriot =

London publisher and bookseller (died 1679)

Richard Marriot (died 1679) was an English publisher and bookseller active in seventeenth century London.

He was apprenticed to his father John Merriot from 1632 to December 1639.
