= Thomas Morley (1513–1559) =

English politician

Thomas Morley (1513–1559), of Glynde, Sussex, was an English politician.

He was a member of parliament (MP) for Arundel in March 1553.
