= John Pitt (attorney) =

English politician

John Pitt (c. 1727 – 14 July 1805) of Gloucester was an English attorney and politician.

== Life ==
The son of James Pitt, he worked as a customs collector, attorney and steward on the estates of Philip Yorke, 1st Earl of Hardwicke. He was a Member (MP) for Gloucester 5 February 1789 to 14 July 1805. He came into parliament as the candidate of those who opposed the candidate of Charles Howard, 11th Duke of Norfolk, a Whig grandee; and reliably supported the administration of William Pitt the younger.
