= Bransby Blake Cooper =

English surgeon

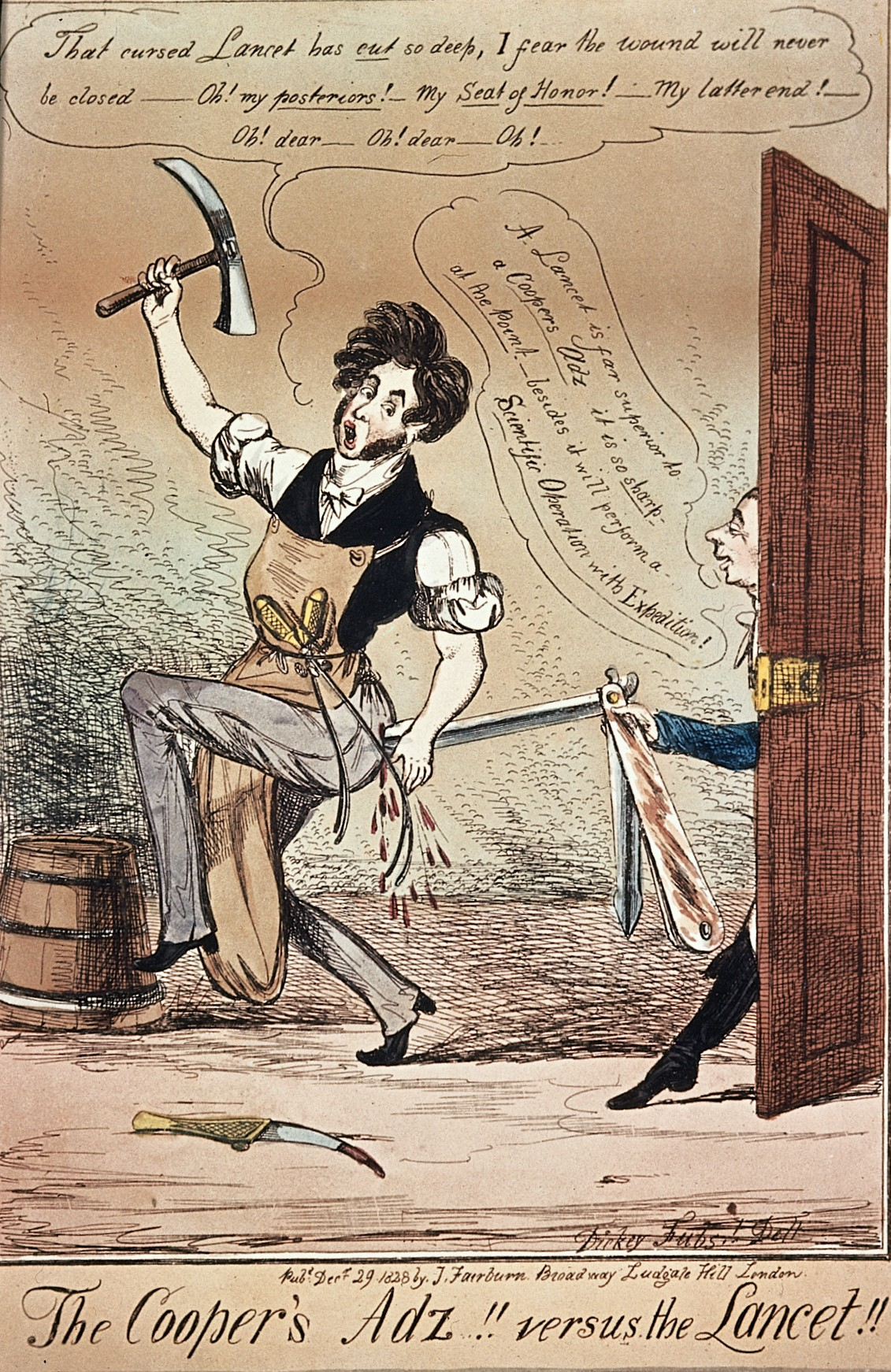
'The Cooper's Adz versus the Lancet' Bransby Blake Cooper being poked in the posterior by a lancet, possibly Thomas Wakley, founder of the medical journal The Lancet.

Bransby Blake Cooper FRS, (2 September 1792, Great Yarmouth – 18 August 1853, London) was an English Surgeon.

Bransby was the grandson of the Rev Dr Samuel Cooper, a Church of England clergyman and grandson of Maria Susanna Bransby, the author of several novels. At an early age he resolved to join the Royal Navy, signing on as a midshipman on HMS Stately in 1805. However, he suffered from sea-sickness to such an extent he had to abandon any nautical career.

Bransby operated on Edward Drummond, who was shot by Daniel M'Naghten, the namesake of the M'Naghten rules.

He was influenced by his uncle, Astley Cooper to enter medicine.
