= Astley Cooper =

British surgeon and anatomist (1768–1841)

Sir Astley Cooper Bt GCH FRS
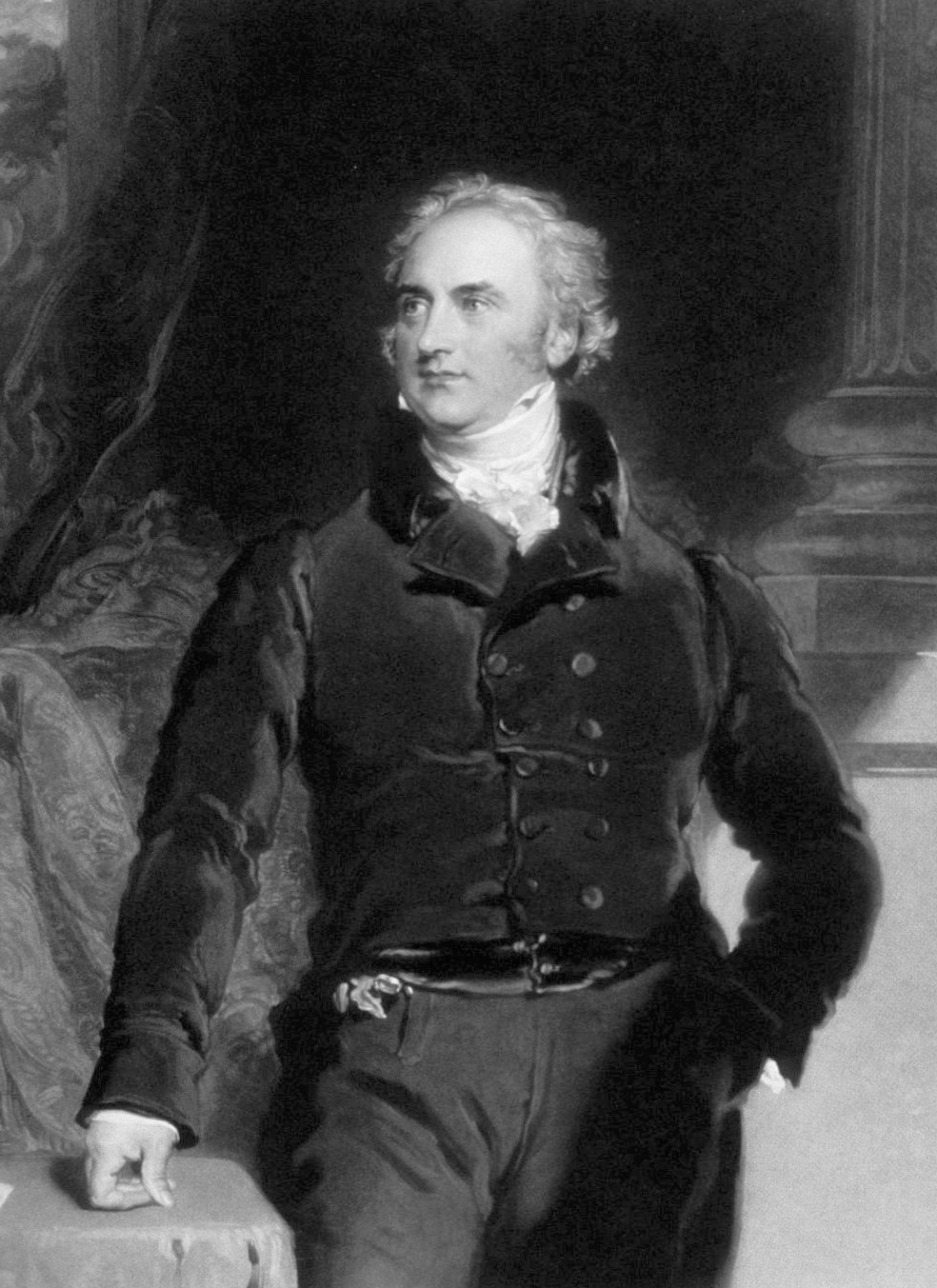
- Astley Cooper by Thomas Lawrence
- Born: 23 August 1768; Brooke, Norfolk, England
- Died: 12 February 1841 (aged 72); London, England
- Education: St. Thomas' Hospital
- Known for: otology vascular surgery human anatomy
- Awards: Copley Medal (1801)
- Scientific career
- Fields: anatomy

Signature
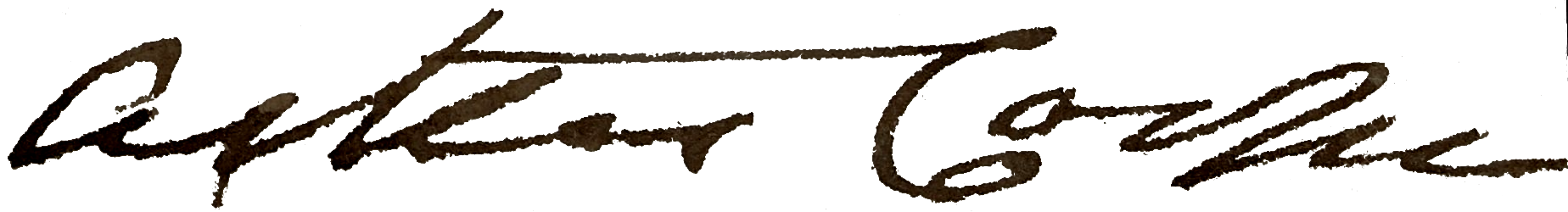

Sir Astley Paston Cooper, 1st Baronet GCH FRS (23 August 1768 – 12 February 1841) was a British surgeon and anatomist, who made contributions to otology, vascular surgery, the anatomy and pathology of the mammary glands and testicles, and the pathology and surgery of hernia.

== Biography ==
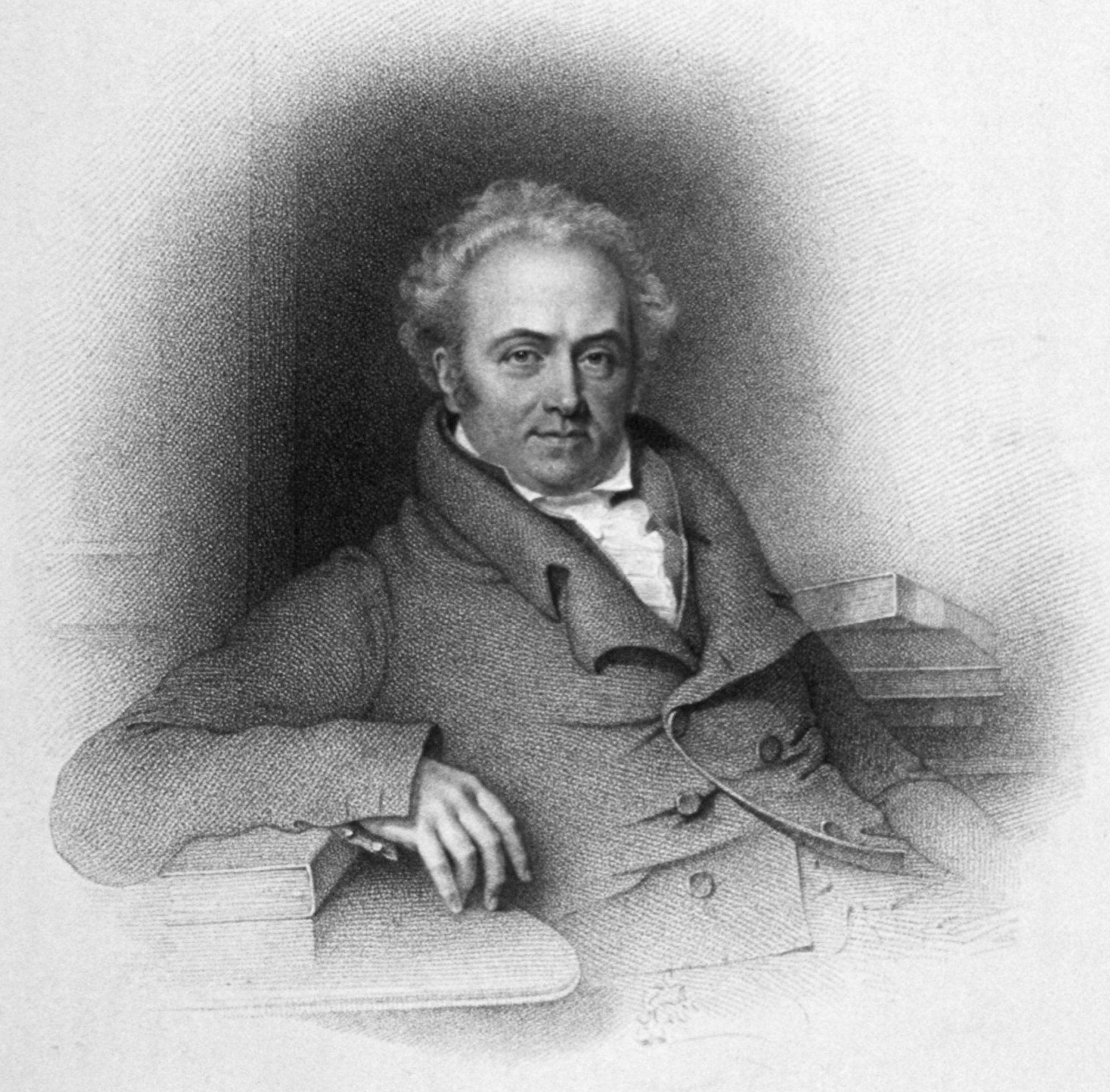
Astley Paston Cooper, c. 1825

Born at Brooke Hall in Brooke, Norfolk on 23 August 1768 and baptised at St. Peter's Church, Brooke, on 9 September, Astley Cooper was the son of the Rev Dr Samuel Cooper, a clergyman of the Church of England; his mother Maria Susanna Cooper née Bransby wrote several epistolary novels. At the age of sixteen he was sent to London and placed under Henry Cline (1750–1827), surgeon to St Thomas' Hospital. From the first he devoted himself to the study of anatomy, and had the privilege of attending the lectures of John Hunter. In 1789 he was appointed demonstrator of anatomy at St Thomas' Hospital, where in 1791 he became joint lecturer with Cline in anatomy and surgery, and in 1800 he was appointed surgeon to Guy's Hospital on the death of his uncle, William Cooper.

Astley Cooper received the Copley Medal in 1801 for two papers read before the Royal Society of London on the destruction of the tympanic membrane. In February 1802 or February 1805 he was elected a Fellow of the Society.

In 1805 he took an active part in the formation of the Medical and Chirurgical Society of London and was its President in 1819. In 1804 he brought out the first, and in 1807 the second, part of his great work on hernia, which added so largely to his reputation that in 1813 his annual professional income rose to 21,000 pounds sterling. In the same year he was appointed professor of comparative anatomy to the Royal College of Surgeons and was very popular as a lecturer.

In 1817 Cooper performed his famous operation of tying the abdominal aorta for aneurysm; and in 1820 he removed an infected wen (in more modern terminology, a sebaceous cyst) from the scalp of King George IV. About six months afterwards he received a baronetcy, which, as he had no son, was to descend to his nephew and adopted son, Astley Cooper. He was appointed sergeant surgeon to George IV in 1828. He served as president of the Royal College of Surgeons in 1827 and again in 1836, and he was elected a vice-president of the Royal Society in 1830. In 1821, he was elected a foreign member of the Royal Swedish Academy of Sciences. He died on 12 February 1841 in London, and is interred, by his own desire, in the crypt of the Chapel of Thomas Guy, St Thomas Street (on the site now shared by King's College London and Guy's Hospital). A statue by Edward Hodges Baily was erected in St Paul's Cathedral.

Cooper lived at Gadebridge House in the market town of Hemel Hempstead. Due to his influence and vigorous lobbying, supported by other residents of the area, a railway line was constructed in the 1830s by the London and Birmingham Railway to the south of the town instead of directly through it. This led to the citizens of Hemel Hempstead having no railway station in their town.

== Legacy ==
The importance of Sir Astley Cooper is remembered with a number of street names (Astley Cooper Place in the village of his birth, Brooke, Norfolk; Astley Road and Paston Road in Hemel Hempstead), and with The Astley Cooper School, formerly Grove Hill School, but renamed after him in 1984.

== Works ==
In the field of vascular surgery and cerebral circulation, Cooper was the first to demonstrate experimentally the effects of bilateral ligation of the carotid arteries in dogs and to propose treatment of aneurysms by ligation of the vessel. In 1805 he published in the first volume of Medico-Chirurgical Transactions, an account of his attempt to tie the common carotid artery for treating an aneurysm in a patient. In 1808 he tried the same with the external iliac artery for a femoral aneurysm and in 1817 he ligated the aorta for an iliac aneurysm.

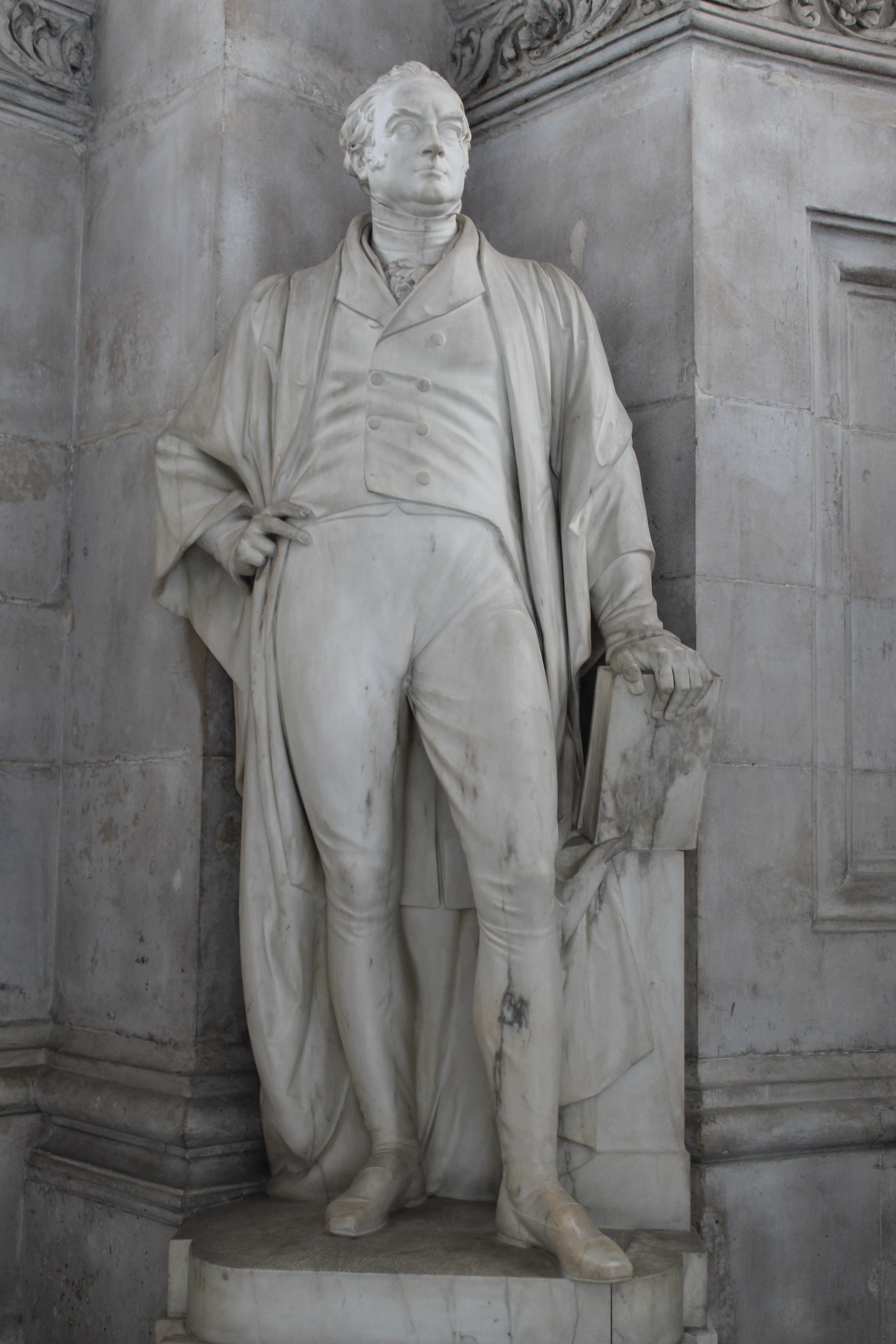
Statue of Cooper, St Paul's Cathedral, London by Edward Hodges Baily

Cooper was an anatomist and identified several previously undescribed anatomical structures, many of which were named after him:

- Cooper's fascia, a covering of the spermatic cord.
- Cooper's pubic ligament, the superior pubic ligament.
- Cooper's stripes, a fibrous structure in the ulnar ligaments.
- Cooper's ligaments, the suspensory ligaments of the breasts.

He also described a number of new diseases, which likewise became eponymous:

- Cooper's testis (neuralgia of the testicles)
- Cooper's disease (benign cysts of the breast)
- Cooper's hernia (retroperitoneal hernia)
- Cooper's neuralgia (neuralgia of the breast)

His chief published works were:

- Anatomy and Surgical Treatment of Hernia (1804–1807);
- Dislocations and Fractures (1822);
- Lectures on Surgery (1824–1827);
- Illustrations of Diseases of the Breast (1829);
- Anatomy of the Thymus Gland (1832);
- Anatomy of the Breast (1840).

== See also ==
- Pathology
- List of pathologists

== Sources ==
- Brock, Russell Claude (1952). The life and work of Astley Cooper.
- Burch, Druin (2007). Digging Up the Dead: Uncovering the Life and Times of an Extraordinary Surgeon.
- Cooper, B. B. (1843). Life of Sir A. Cooper. J.W. Parker.

Baronetage of the United Kingdom
New title	Baronet (of Gadebridge); 1821–1841	Succeeded by Astley Paston Cooper
