= Robert Blake (MP) =

English politician

Member of Parliament for Arundel
- In office 8 October 1819 – 31 December 1823

Personal details
- Born: 2 March 1766
- Died: 8 February 1823 (aged 56)
- Party: Tory
- Education: Winchester College

Robert Blake (2 March 1766 – 8 February 1823) was an English politician. He was member of parliament for Arundel from 1819 to 1823.

== See also ==
- List of MPs elected in the 1820 United Kingdom general election
- List of MPs elected in the 1818 United Kingdom general election
