= James Emerson Tennent =

Irish politician and traveller (1804–1869)

Sir James Emerson Tennent Bt FRS
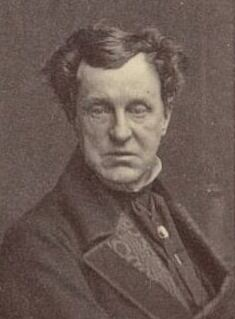
- James Tennent after 1853

5th Colonial Secretary of Ceylon
- In office 1846–1850
- Monarch: Queen Victoria
- Preceded by: Philip Anstruther
- Succeeded by: Charles Justin MacCarthy

Acting Governor of British Ceylon
- In office 19 April 1847 – 29 May 1847
- Monarch: Queen Victoria
- Preceded by: Colin Campbell
- Succeeded by: The Viscount Torrington

Personal details
- Born: James Emerson; 7 April 1804 Belfast, Ireland
- Died: 6 March 1869 (aged 64) London
- Citizenship: United Kingdom
- Party: Whigs (until 1834); Conservatives (1834–1869)
- Spouse: Letitia Tennent
- Children: 3
- Education: Trinity College, Dublin
- Occupation: Colonial administrator, politician
- Profession: Lawyer

Sir James Emerson Tennent, 1st Baronet, FRS (born James Emerson; 7 April 1804 – 6 March 1869) was a Conservative Member of the United Kingdom Parliament for the Irish seats of Belfast and of Lisburn, and a resident Colonial Secretary in Ceylon. Opposed to the restoration of a parliament in Dublin, his defence of Ireland's union with Great Britain emphasised what he conceived as the liberal virtues of British imperial administration. In Ceylon, his policies in support the growing plantation and wage economy met with peasant resistance in the Matale Rebellion of 1848. In recognition of his encyclopedic surveys of the colony, in 1862 he was elected a Fellow of the Royal Society.

== Early life ==
He was born in North Street, Belfast, on 7 April 1804, third and only surviving son of William Emerson (d. 1821), of Ardmore, County Armagh, a wealthy tobacco merchant, and Sarah, youngest daughter of William Arbuthnot of Ardmore, County Armagh. He was educated at the Belfast Academy and at Trinity College.

== Volunteer in Greek War of Independence ==
With his college friend, Robert James Tennent, he took up the cause of Greek independence. At the beginning of 1824 he travelled to Greece, and when he arrived in Messolonghi, joined the artillery corps formed by Lord Byron. He was to remain at the side of the poet until his death in April. After a respite of some months in England, he returned to Greece in March 1825. Appointed a captain of artillery, some sources place him in the battle to break the Siege of the Acropolis in Athens.

In 1826 he published in London his first book entitled Picture of Greece, which contributed to the development of the philhellenic sentiment in Great Britain. It was followed by Letters from the Aegean (1829), and a History of Modern Greece (1830). He also authored a series of unsigned articles in the British press, supporting the Greek struggle.

== Called to the Bar, married ==
In 1831, with the support of Jeremy Bentham, he was called to the English bar at Lincoln's Inn. That same year, he married his friend's cousin, Letitia, co-heiress to the mercantile fortune of her father, the Belfast merchant-patrician (and former United Irishman) William Tennent. After his father-in-law's death in 1832, by royal licence Emerson added Tennent to his family name.

== Enters Parliament for Belfast ==
Following the Reform Act 1832, both he and Robert Tennent decided to contest the first open election for the two-seat Belfast constituency, previously in the "pocket" of the town's proprietor, Lord Donegall. Emerson choose to stand as an Independent Whig in the Donegall interest, while (consistent with both is father's and his uncle's democratic politics) stood as a Whig on a platform of further reform. Emerson Tennent and a Tory candidate prevailed in a victory that Protestant loyalists celebrated with an attack on the central Catholic district (Hercules Street) and with an attempt to ransack Robert Tennent's house.

Once in Parliament, Emerson Tennent took the Tory whip. He supported Sir Robert Peel in his first ministry (1834–35), but broke with his "liberal Conservatives" over the repeal of the Corn Laws in his second (1841–46). He joined the moderate Conservative followers of Edward Smith-Stanley, the Earl of Derby.

Replying to Daniel O'Connell in the 1834 Commons debate on Repeal of the Union, Emerson Tennent sought to eschew the Protestant sectionalism and fear of Catholicism, generally assumed to be the central elements of unionist thought. Instead, he raised issues close to O'Connell heart as a campaigning abolitionist. Reflecting on the recent vote to suppress slavery in the British Empire, he remarked:

I shall never fail to regard it as a proud distinction that I have myself been enabled, during the course of the last twelve months, to contribute my own humble vote, to extend the blessings of freedom from the confines of India to the remotest shores of the Atlantic; to liberate the Hindoo, and to strike off the fetters of the African. These are the triumphs beyond the reach of a 'Local Legislature'...toward which the highest ambition of an Irish Parliament could never soar; these are the honours which enable our birth-place as Irishmen, to add to our distinctions the glory of being Britons.

At the end of 1845, his promising parliamentary career (in 1841 he had been made Secretary to the Board of Control) came, temporarily, to end when he realised that his strong support for Catholic civil and political equality in Ireland had compromised his chances of re-election from Belfast. Following apparent defeat in the August 1837 general election, he was only seated on petition. In the July 1841 general election his victory was disputed, and a new writ issued; he regained the seat in the ensuing by-election (August 1842).

== Colonial administrator, Ceylon ==
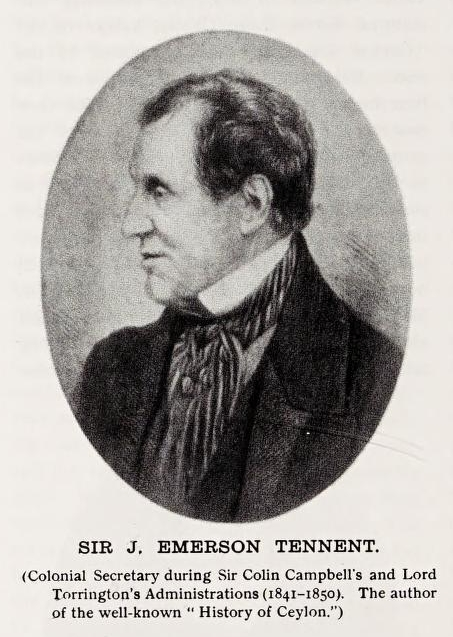

In 1845 Emerson Tennent was knighted and appointed Colonial Secretary of Ceylon, where he remained until 1850. In a response to an economic depression that severely affected growers and merchants for coffee and cinnamon, he persuaded Earl Grey, Secretary of State for Colonies in London to shift the burden of the colony's tax revenue from export duties to imposts on guns, dogs, carts, and shops, and to a tax to be paid in lieu of compulsory labour on plantation roads. The policy sharpened the plight of the progressively dispossessed peasantry and increased the pressure upon them to submit to wage labour, their resistance to which had forced cash-crop planters to import large numbers of Tamil "coolies" from southern India. The resulting tensions contributed to the Matale Rebellion of 1848.

Emerson Teennet's reflections on his residence in Ceylon appeared in Christianity in Ceylon (1850) and Ceylon, Physical, Historical and Topographical (2 vols., 1859). The latter was illustrated by his protégé, fellow Ulsterman Andrew Nicholl. The Oxford English Dictionary attributes to it the first use in English of "rogue elephant", a translation of the Sinhala term wal aliya. He was elected the second President of the newly formed Ceylon Branch of the Royal Asiatic Society, serving from 1846 to 1857.

== Last years ==
On his return to the United Kingdom, he became member for Lisburn, and under Lord Derby was secretary to the Poor Law Board in 1852. From 1852 until 1867 he was permanent secretary to the Board of Trade. In this he was adjudged a failure by Disraeli, the Tory leader in the House of Commons, who wrote in 1866: "He has turned out to be the most inefficient & useless of our public servants: no business in him: no sound information: his dept. in a disgraceful state & himself a mere club gossip & office lounger". On his retirement he was created a baronet of Tempo Manor in the Chapelry of Tempo in the County of Fermanagh. In 1862, he was elected a Fellow of the Royal Society.

Emerson Tennent died in London on 6 March 1869. His family consisted of two daughters and a son, Sir William Emerson Tennent, who was an official in the Board of Trade, and at whose death the baronetcy became extinct.

Besides the books above mentioned, Emerson Tennent wrote Belgium in 1840 (1841), and Wine: its Duties and Taxation (1855), Sketches of the Natural History of Ceylon (1861), The Wild Elephant and The Method Of Capturing It in Ceylon (1867), and was a contributor to magazines and a frequent correspondent of Notes and Queries. He was a friend of both Charles Dickens and it was to Emerson Tennent that Dickens dedicated his last completed novel Our Mutual Friend (1865).

James Emerson Tennent is commemorated in the scientific name of a species of Sri Lankan lizard, Ceratophora tennentii.

Parliament of the United Kingdom
Preceded by Sir Arthur Chichester, Bt	Member of Parliament for Belfast; 1832 – 1837; With: Lord Arthur Chichester 1832–35; John McCance 1835; George Dunbar 1835–37	Succeeded by Earl of Belfast; James Gibson
Preceded by Earl of Belfast; James Gibson	Member of Parliament for Belfast; 1838 – 1845; With: George Dunbar 1838–41; William Gillilan Johnson 1841–42; David Robert Ross from 1842	Succeeded by David Robert Ross; Lord John Chichester
Preceded by Horace Seymour	Member of Parliament for Lisburn; January 1852 – December 1852	Succeeded by Roger Johnson Smyth
Government offices
Preceded by Colin Campbell	Governor of Ceylon acting governor 1847	Succeeded by The Viscount Torrington
Preceded by Philip Anstruther	Colonial Secretary of Ceylon; 1846–1850	Succeeded by Charles Justin MacCarthy
Baronetage of the United Kingdom
New creation	Baronet (of Tempo Manor); 1867–1869	Succeeded by William Emerson Tennent
