= Lord Arthur Chichester =

Anglo-Irish peer and British politician

Lord Arthur Chichester (30 September 1808 – 25 January 1840), was an Anglo-Irish Member of Parliament (MP).

Chichester was the fourth son of George Chichester, 2nd Marquess of Donegall, and Anna, daughter of Sir Edward May, 2nd Baronet. George Chichester, 3rd Marquess of Donegall, Edward Chichester, 4th Marquess of Donegall, and Lord John Chichester were his brothers.

Chichester was returned to Parliament as one of two representatives for Belfast in 1832, a seat he held until 1835. Chichester died in January 1840, aged 31.

Parliament of the United Kingdom
Preceded by Sir Arthur Chichester, Bt	Member of Parliament for Belfast; 1832–1835; With: James Emerson Tennent	Succeeded by James Emerson Tennent; John McCance
