= George Dunbar (MP) =

Irish politician (1810–1875)

George Dunbar (1800 – 17 August 1875) was an Irish politician.

Born at Landmore in County Londonderry as George Orr, he changed his surname to "Dunbar" in 1833. He practised as a barrister. At the 1835 Belfast by-election, Dunbar stood for the Conservative Party, winning the seat. He was defeated at the 1837 UK general election, but in March 1838 was awarded the seat on petition. He stood down at the 1841 UK general election.

In 1842, Dunbar was elected as the first Mayor of Belfast, serving until 1844.

Parliament of the United Kingdom
Preceded by John McCance; James Emerson Tennent	Member of Parliament for Belfast; 1835 – 1837; With: James Emerson Tennent	Succeeded by George Chichester; James Gibson
Preceded by George Chichester; James Gibson	Member of Parliament for Belfast; 1838 – 1841; With: James Emerson Tennent	Succeeded by William Gillilan Johnson; James Emerson Tennent
Civic offices
Preceded by Thomas Verner as Sovereign of Belfast	Mayor of Belfast; 1842–1844	Succeeded by John Dunbar
