= Lord John Chichester =

Irish politician

Lord John Ludford Chichester (November 1811 – 22 April 1873), was an Anglo-Irish Member of Parliament.

Chichester was the sixth son of George Chichester, 2nd Marquess of Donegall, and Anna May, daughter of Sir Edward May, 2nd Baronet. George Chichester, 3rd Marquess of Donegall, Edward Chichester, 4th Marquess of Donegall, and Lord Arthur Chichester were among his brothers.

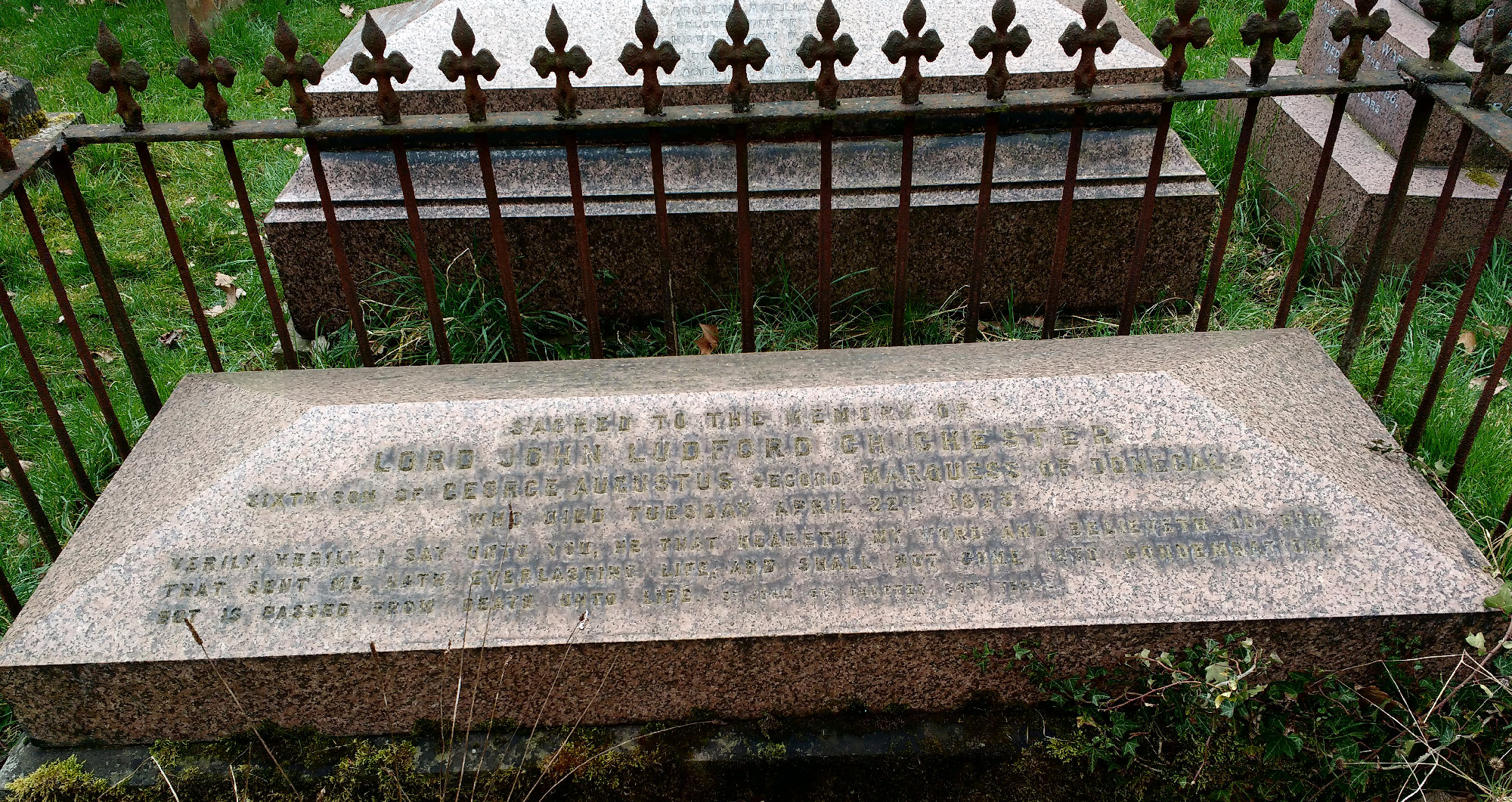
Chichester's grave at St Andrews's Church, Ham

Chichester was returned to Parliament as one of two representatives for Belfast in 1845, a seat he held until 1852. He spoke once in the House of Commons, in 1850, where he protested to the speaker that he and several other MP's had missed a vote because the bell in the room in which they were waiting was broken.

Chichester married Caroline Bevan, daughter of Henry Bevan, in 1844. He died in April 1873, aged 61, at Cambridge House, Twickenham and is buried at St Andrew's Church, Ham. His wife survived him by ten years and died in December 1883.

Parliament of the United Kingdom
Preceded by James Emerson Tennent; David Robert Ross	Member of Parliament for Belfast; 1845–1852; With: David Robert Ross 1845–1847; Robert James Tennent 1847–1852	Succeeded by Richard Davison; Hugh Cairns
