= Charles Lanyon =

English architect (1813–1889)

- Born: 6 January 1813; Eastbourne, Sussex, England
- Died: 31 May 1889 (aged 76); Whiteabbey, County Antrim, Ireland
- Occupation: Architect
- Buildings: Belfast Castle, Castle Leslie, The Lanyon Building at Queen's University Belfast
- Projects: more than 50 churches

Charles Lanyon

Member of Parliament
- In office 2 November 1866 – 21 November 1868
- Constituency: Belfast (UK Parliament constituency)

Sir Charles Lanyon DL, JP (6 January 1813 – 31 May 1889) was an English architect of the 19th century. His work is most closely associated with Belfast, Northern Ireland.

== Biography ==
Lanyon was born in Eastbourne, Sussex (now East Sussex) in 1813. His father was John Jenkinson Lanyon, a purser in the Royal Navy, and his mother was Catherine Anne Mortimer.

Following his education, he became an apprentice civil engineer with Jacob Owen in Portsmouth. When Owen was made senior Engineer and Architect of the Irish Board of Works and moved to Dublin, Lanyon followed. In 1835, he married Owen's daughter, Elizabeth Helen. They had ten children, including Sir William Owen Lanyon, an army officer and colonial administrator.

Charles Lanyon was briefly a county surveyor in County Kildare in Ireland, before moving north to County Antrim. He remained county surveyor of Antrim until 1860.

Lanyon was elected Mayor of Belfast in 1862, and as a Conservative was elected to Parliament in 1866. He stood again for two-seat borough constituency in the 1868 elections alongside John Mulholland, the owner of the York Street Spinning Mill. But an unprecedented understanding between William Johnston, the candidate of "Protestant Workingmen", and the largely Catholic-supported Liberal candidate,Thomas McClure, ensured a Conservative defeat. Johnston topped the poll.

Lanyon, who was knighted in 1868, continued to serve as a Belfast Town councillor and on the Belfast Harbour Commission. He served as president of the Royal Institute of the Architects of Ireland, as High Sheriff and Deputy Lieutenant for County Antrim and, for many years, as a Justice of the Peace.

His business interests included being director of the Blackstaff Flax Spinning Company and chairman of several railway companies. He was made director of the Northern Counties Railway in 1870, but resigned in 1887 because of ill-health.

Alongside his business activities he was an active Freemason and served as Provincial Deputy Grand Master of Belfast and North Down between 1863 and 1868, Provincial Deputy Grand Master of Antrim between 1868 and 1883 and Provincial Grand Master of Antrim between 1883 and 1889.

Lanyon lived at 'The Abbey' a grand house in Whiteabbey, which eventually became a sanitorium during World War I and is now part of Whiteabbey Hospital. He died there on 31 May 1889 and is buried in Knockbreda Cemetery. His will is recorded in the Public Records Office of Northern Ireland:

8 August 1889, LANYON, Sir Charles, Effects £53,785 1s 3d. The will (with 5 codiciles) of Sir Charles Lanyon, late of the Abbey, Whiteabbey, Co. Antrim, Knight, to died 31 May 1889 at the same place, was proved at Belfast by John Lanyon of Lisbreen, Fortwilliam Park Belfast, CE Herbert Owen Lanyon of Castletown Terrace, Belfast, Merchant, and Elizabeth Helen Lanyon of the Abbey, Whiteabbey, Spinster.

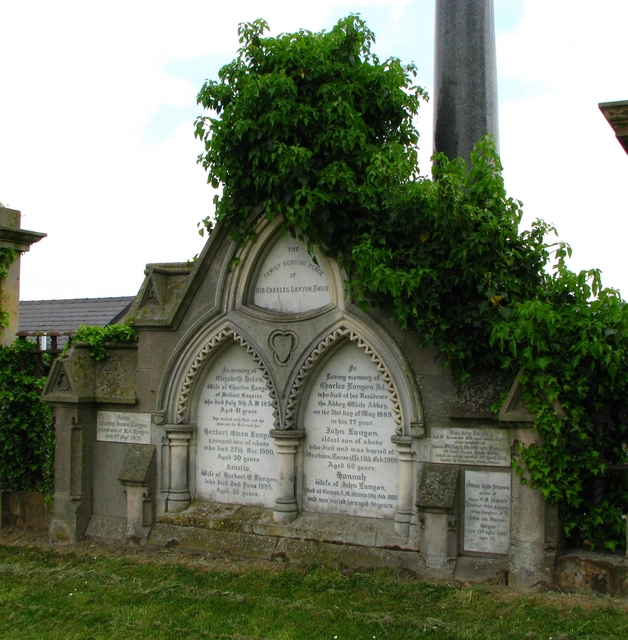
Lanyon memorial in Knockbreda Cemetery.

== Notable works ==
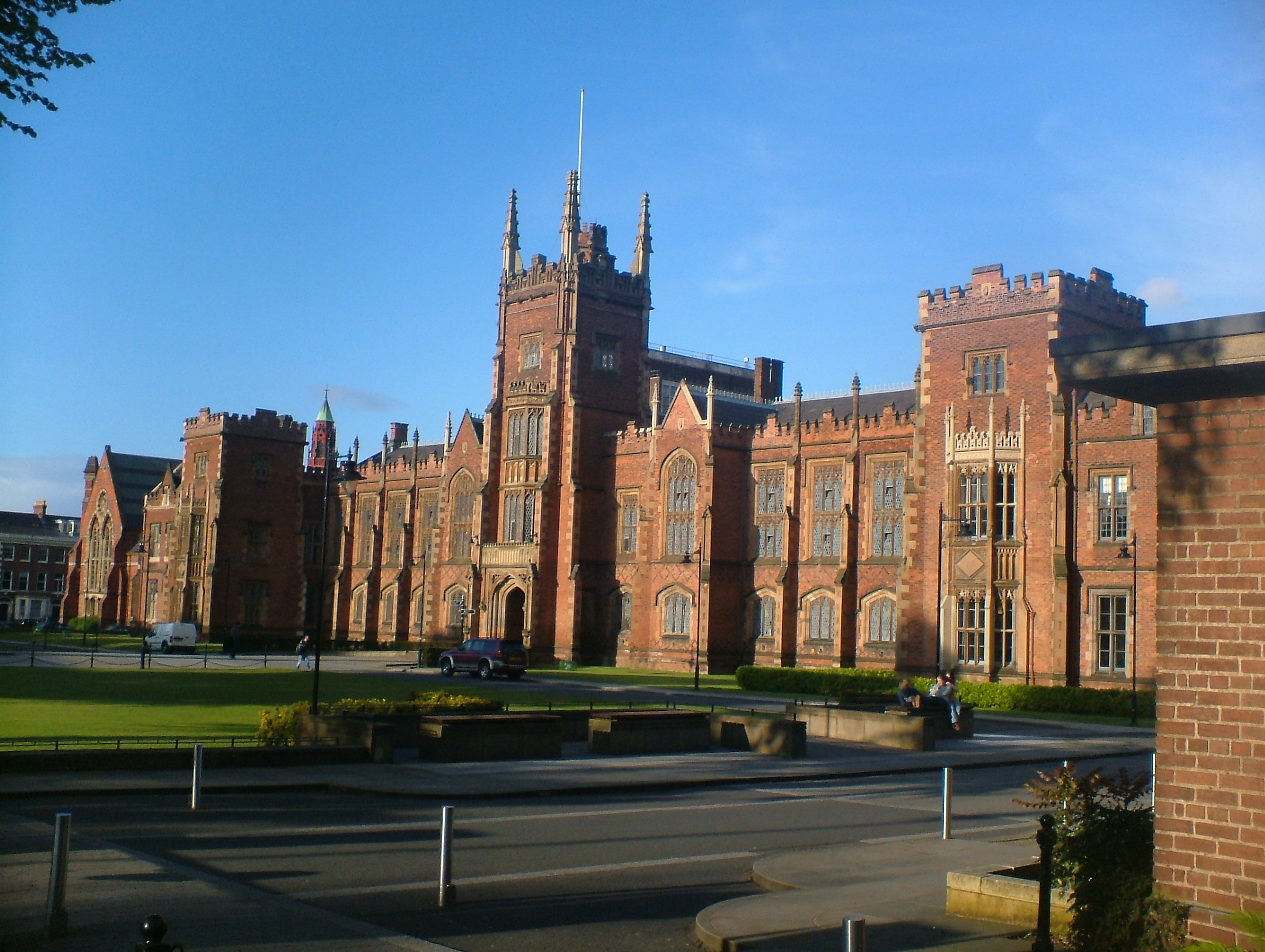
The Lanyon Building is Queen's main building.

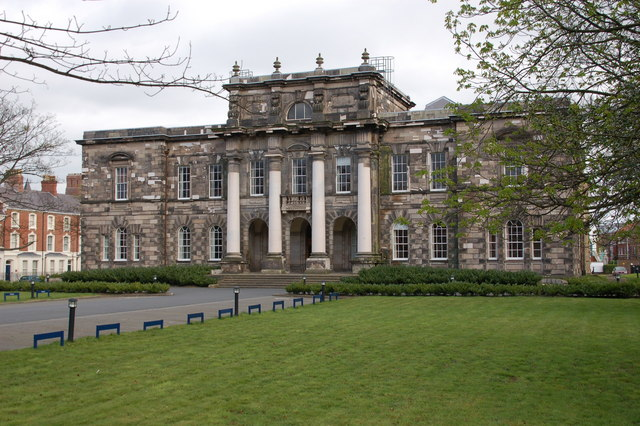
Union Theological College, then Assembly's College, was Lanyon's work

=== Antrim Coast Road (1832–1842) ===
The north Antrim coast was difficult to reach for many years. The Irish Commissioners of Public Works promoted the construction of the Antrim Coast Road between 1832 and 1842 by civil engineer William Bald. Lanyon was the County Surveyor for part of this time (1836–1842) and would have had a considerable supervisory role. The route runs from Larne up through Ballygalley, Glenarm, Carnlough, Glenariff to Ballycastle. Its construction involved removingthousands of tonnes of rock using explosives, and building sea walls. Part of this route included the Glendun Viaduct.

=== Ballymoney Court House (1838) ===
Ballymoney Court House, one of Charles Lanyon's earlier buildings, was completed in 1838. It cost £1,125, plus £40 for the bench and fitting up. It is made mostly of basalt blocks with brick dressings. The main doorway is surrounded by a thick stone frame. Many of the window frames and sills are made of brown basalt. Strangely enough it is not currently a listed building.

=== Frosses Road (1839) ===
When a road was needed from Ballymena to Ballymoney, the straightest route was over the large Frosses Bog. Lanyon planted 1500 large Scots pine trees in two lines so that the roots would intermingle, and would create a surface for a road to be built.

=== Glendun Viaduct, Glendun (1839) ===
This huge arch-shaped viaduct was finally completely built in 1839.

=== Palm House, Botanic Gardens, Belfast (1840) ===
The palm house was probably Lanyon's only building of this type. It is a curvilinear iron and glass structure, and is one of the oldest surviving examples in the world.

=== St. John's Church, Whitehouse (1840) ===
This Church of Ireland church was opened in 1840, by licence. It cost £716.16.0 to build. This was and still is one of the most successful churches in the Carnmoney Parish. It was designed for free by Lanyon who was a member of Carnmoney Parish. At the side of the church Lanyon built a small school hall for £300, which was used as a school until 1930. It was used as a NAAFI mess for the troops in the Second World War, but it was demolished in 1965 to make way for a new church hall.

=== St John's, Glynn (1841) ===
This was built in 1841 for a cost of £800.

=== Raloo Parish Church, Glenoe (1842) ===
This church was built in 1842 for the cost of £436 and was designed to hold the entire population of the village (less than 200).

=== Gills Almshouses, Carrickfergus (1842) ===
These almshouses were designed to replace the old charity houses in 1842 which were in very bad repair. The front of the building is symmetrical on either side, with black bricks on the edge. It is made of normal sandstone, and is currently painted white. The building was not always white. The original sandstone was crumbling away, so it was rendered. This explains why the white walls stand out from the cornerstones instead of the other way around.

Gill's Almshouses: A : 1842; Charles Lanyon, architect. The charitable endowment of Henry Gill who, dying in 1761, bequeathed "to fourteen aged men, decayed in their circumstances, £10 each per annum and also houses and gardens", in Ellis Street (see No. 23a). Later this further block was built facing the harbour. The pretty Tudor revival style is reminiscent of contemporary churches and schools designed by the same architect, then County Surveyor of Antrim. The middle and wing bays of the symmetrical five-bay front project slightly and have tall double-shouldered gables with curious finials like inverted gate posts. Beneath the datestone the central front doorway has a four-centred arch, recessed surround, and a hood moulding with big cabbage-like bosses all dulled by dark paint. The intermediate bays have square windows with plain chamfered frames. Each wing bay has a triple window, the centre light taller than its neighbours, embraced by a label moulding which echoes the stepping of the gables. Single pointed lancets with mouldings akin to that on the front door light the gables. Above the steep tiled roof rise two chimneys with a pair of diagon¬ally set stacks apiece.

Nowadays it appears that the almshouses rival the inmates in their decayed circumstances, for, while the black and white paint-work is tidy, the facade shows an alarming inclination to land at the feet of those who stand in front to admire it. This is a good little build¬ing, adding much to the town's seafront, and worthy of careful renovation. Happily the James Butcher Housing Association is now undertaking this work.

=== Ulster Institute for the Deaf, Dumb and Blind, Lisburn Road, Belfast (1845) ===
Lanyon built this large redbrick building on the Lisburn Road, on the site currently occupied by the Medical Biology Centre (MBC), Queen's University of Belfast on which he based Queens College. Unlike Queen's, it was not kept well and it was demolished in 1965 by Queens University Belfast.

=== Randalstown Viaducts, Randalstown (1847) ===
Of these two bridges, only the taller, newer one – a four-arch viaduct – was designed by Lanyon..

=== Queen's University (1849) ===
Lanyon designed the main building of Queen's University of Belfast in 1847–1849, The design for the central tower was based on Magdalen College in Oxford, and is repeated in the smaller towers. The back of the building is not as intricate as the front, as the college had problems with funding. The building is famous for its Gothic Revival facade and Great Hall.

The main atrium of the Lanyon building houses a marble statue of Galileo. Most notable for his advances in physics, he was also a deep thinker and philosopher, resulting in the statue portrayed seated.

The Great Hall underwent an extensive £2.5m renovation in 2002, restoring it to Lanyon's original plans. The restoration was funded by the Heritage Lottery Fund and the hall was reopened by The Prince of Wales. Lanyon also designed the nearby Union Theological College.

=== The Abbey, Whiteabbey (1850) ===
Whiteabbey, a village in the parish of Carnmoney, Barony of Lower Belfast, County of Antrim and province of Ulster, 4 miles (N.) from Belfast on the shore of Belfast Lough; containing 71 houses and 391 inhabitants. It takes its name from an old abbey whose picturesque ruins consist of a chapel, the remains of which denote the early English style of architecture, but at what time or name or by whom founded it is not known.

Lewis, Samuel, A Topographical Dictionary of Ireland, vol.II, London: S Lewis & Co., 1837, p712

This house was designed and built in 1850 for Richard Davison MP, on the site of another MP, Samuel Getty, who had a gentleman's cottage on the site. It was named "The Abbey" because it was on the site of an ancient Cistercian abbey which stood nearby from 1215 to 1925. Its entrance is very like Abbeydene, but with no pillars.

Abbey, the residence of William Getty Esquire, is a spacious and handsome residence, possessing much taste in its style of construction and presenting a handsomely ornamented and stone-finished front. It is situationed in a handsome lawn of about 10 acres, which is well laid out and planted. Abbey was erected in 1835.

Ordnance Survey, Memoirs of Ireland, Parishes of County Antrim, 1, 1838–9

In 1897 the house was purchased by the Granville Hotel Company for use as a tuberculosis hydrotherapy centre, employing Sebastian Kneipp's naturopathy technique.

The residence of Sir Charles Lanyon at Whiteabbey near Belfast has been purchased by a syndicate for conversion into a hydropatholic establishment. It stands on 33 acres and in a most picturesque situation.

The Irish Builder, 15 April 1897

Whiteabbey – At Whiteabbey near Belfast, the mansion known as "The Abbey" formerly the seat of Sir Charles Lanyon was purchased by Granville Hotel Company and converted into a Hydro with all the latest improvements. Ranges of baths had been inserted and a new wing will shortly be built.

The Irish Builder, 1 December 1899, p200

The private treatment centre became Whiteabbey Sanatorium during the First World War, then developed into Whiteabbey Hospital in the 1930s, with the construction of the Lanyon Building. It is currently a non-acute medical and surgical hospital.

=== Crumlin Road Gaol and Courthouse (1848/1850) ===
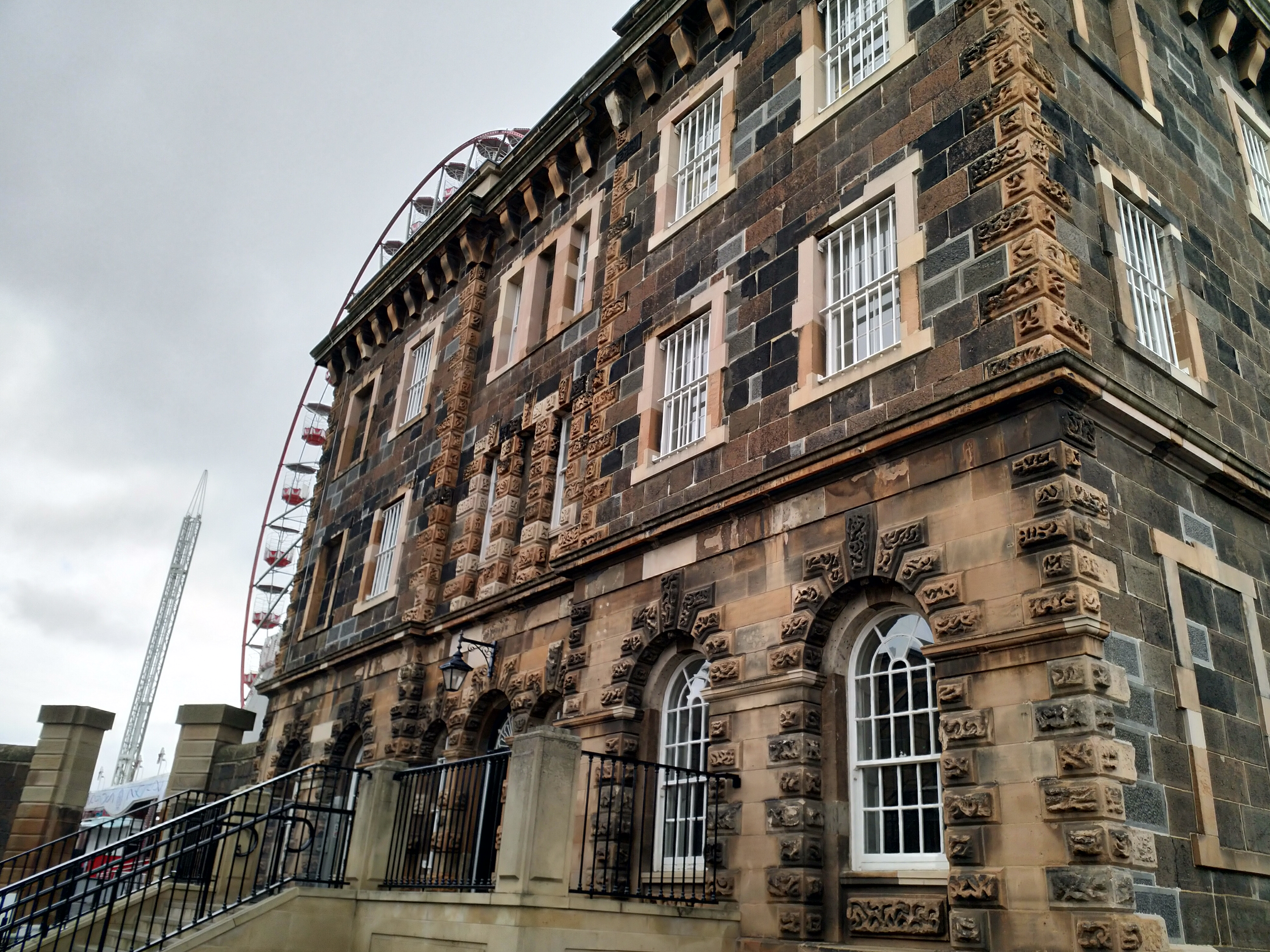
HM Prison Crumlin Road

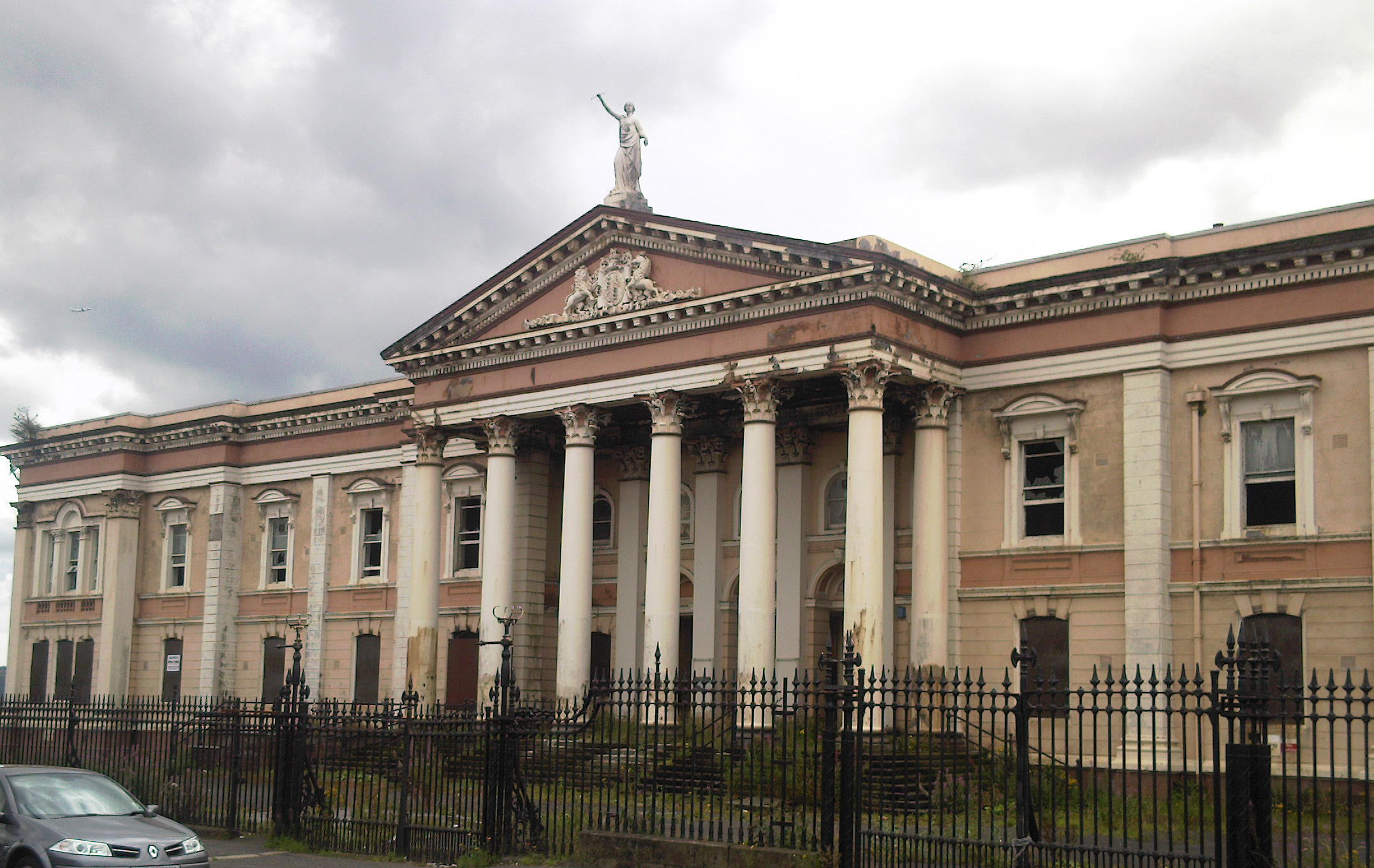
Crumlin Road Courthouse

Lanyon designed the Crumlin Road Gaol and, opposite it, the Crumlin Road Courthouse between 1846 and 1850. Built in an innovative style at the time and based on London's Pentonville prison, the design is known as the "radial cellular system", and "The Crum" was the first to be built in Ireland. The building has four separate wings, each one either three or four stories high. In total there are 640 individual cells which have small windows on the doors, leading to the inspection hall. A tunnel links the jail to the courthouse on the opposite side of the road. The building is currently derelict. However, due to its historical and architectural significance a major restoration and redevelopment is planned. The two buildings are linked by an infamous tunnel.

People commented that Lanyon's experience with churches and lecture halls had influenced his design for the courthouse. Charles was instructed that the cost should not exceed £16,000 but he tendered £16,500 which was accepted. The building is two-storied and in Neo-Palladian classical style. It was enlarged in 1905 when new blocks were added to either side of the façade. It was closed in June 1998 after nearly 150 years of use. It was sold to a private developer, Barry Gilligan in 2003. On 8 February 2004 there was a large fire which broke out in the Courthouse. The building was poorly secured and was used by local youths as a drinking den, but also was an attraction for Northern Ireland urban explorers. On 12 March 2009 the Courthouse was once again set on fire, destroying some of the front offices. Finally, on 15 August 2009, a major fire broke out destroying much of the remainder, and resulting in the building becoming hazardous.

=== Abbeydene, Whiteabbey (1850) ===
Abbeydene was built in 1850 for John Finlay, who was a flax and tow merchant. The building is made from gold sandstone, and has a grand front entrance with a tall wooden door and several sandstone pillars. From 1895 until 1915 Edward Robinson of "Robinson and Cleavers" lived here. Abbeydene was originally called Lismara when it was home to Sir Crawford McCullagh, 1st Baronet, renamed in 1948 when it became a nursing home. It has beenrenovated and is now a single residence again.

=== Waringstown Presbyterian Church (1853) ===
Until 1846 Waringstown was part of the Dromore Presbytery. At this time the growing population of Presbyterians led to linen merchant John Henning presenting a request that the 80 families in the area be approved as a separate congregation. The service were held in the loft of the weaving factory adjacent to Murray House up the Banbridge Road. Michael McMurray was appointed as the Minister in 1848. He married into the Brown family who provided the site for The Desmesne in the village. In 1851the foundation for the new church in Mill Hill was laid and by 1853 the church was open for worship. The architect chosen to design the church was Ireland's foremost architect, Sir Charles Lanyon

=== Belfast Custom House ===
Considered by many to be Belfast's finest architectural feature, Lanyon designed the Custom House in 1857. Built in the Italian Renaissance style, the building features carved statues of Britannia, Neptune and Mercury. Until the 1950s the steps of the building served as Belfast's Speaker's Corner. It was here that trade union leader James Larkin addressed crowds of up to 20,000 people during the 1907 Belfast Dock strike. The writer Anthony Trollope was employed here before finding fame. Today Customs House Square and the adjoining Queen's Square are Belfast City Centre's main venue for free concerts and public events. McHugh's Bar and The Albert Clock are also located here.

=== Sinclair Seaman's Presbyterian Church ===
Lanyon designed Sinclair Seaman's Presbyterian Church in 1856. Thomas Sinclair commissioned the church in memory of his father John Sinclair, who was a merchant from Belfast. Located on Corporation Square in Belfast's docks area, locally known as Sailortown, the church has a distinctive maritime theme. The lectern is made in the shape of a ship's prow. It also features a brass wheel and capstan from a World War I wreck, navigation lights from a Guinness barge, and the ship's bell from the pre-World War I battleship HMS Hood.

=== Castle Leslie ===
Castle Leslie, situated in Glaslough, County Monaghan, Ireland, was designed by Lanyon in 1870 for John Leslie MP. Leslie was a descendant of Bishop Charles Leslie.

== Other works ==
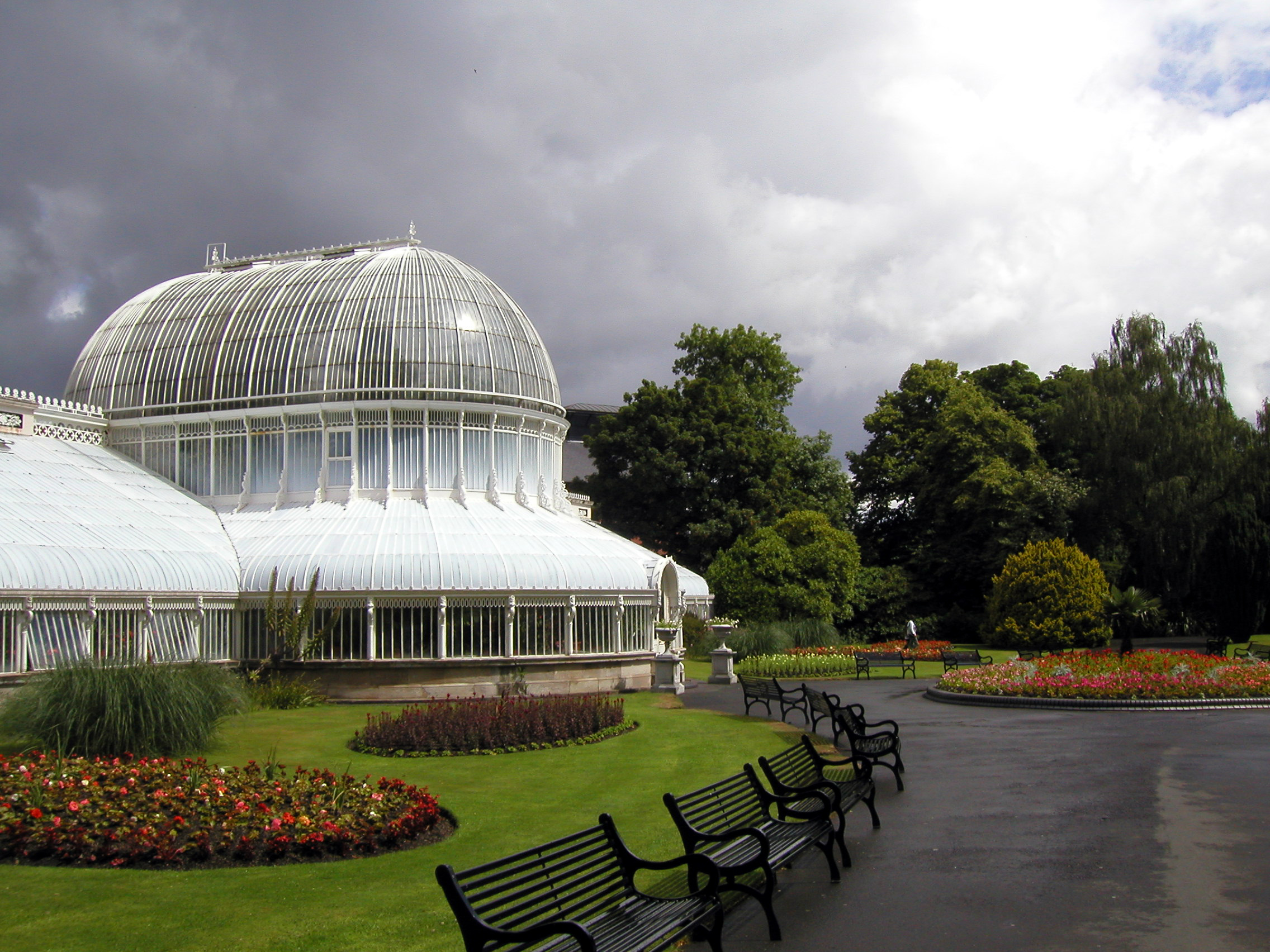
The Belfast Botanic Gardens Palm House

Other works by Lanyon in Belfast include the Linenhall Library, Belfast Castle, the Palm House at the Belfast Botanic Gardens, Methodist College Belfast, Stranmillis House, The Assembly Rooms in Waring Street, the Masonic Hall in Arthur Square and both the Queen's Bridge and Ormeau Bridge. He also designed Falls Road Methodist Church, Divis Street, Belfast, which was opened in 1854 and closed in 1966 when it was replaced by Divis Tower.

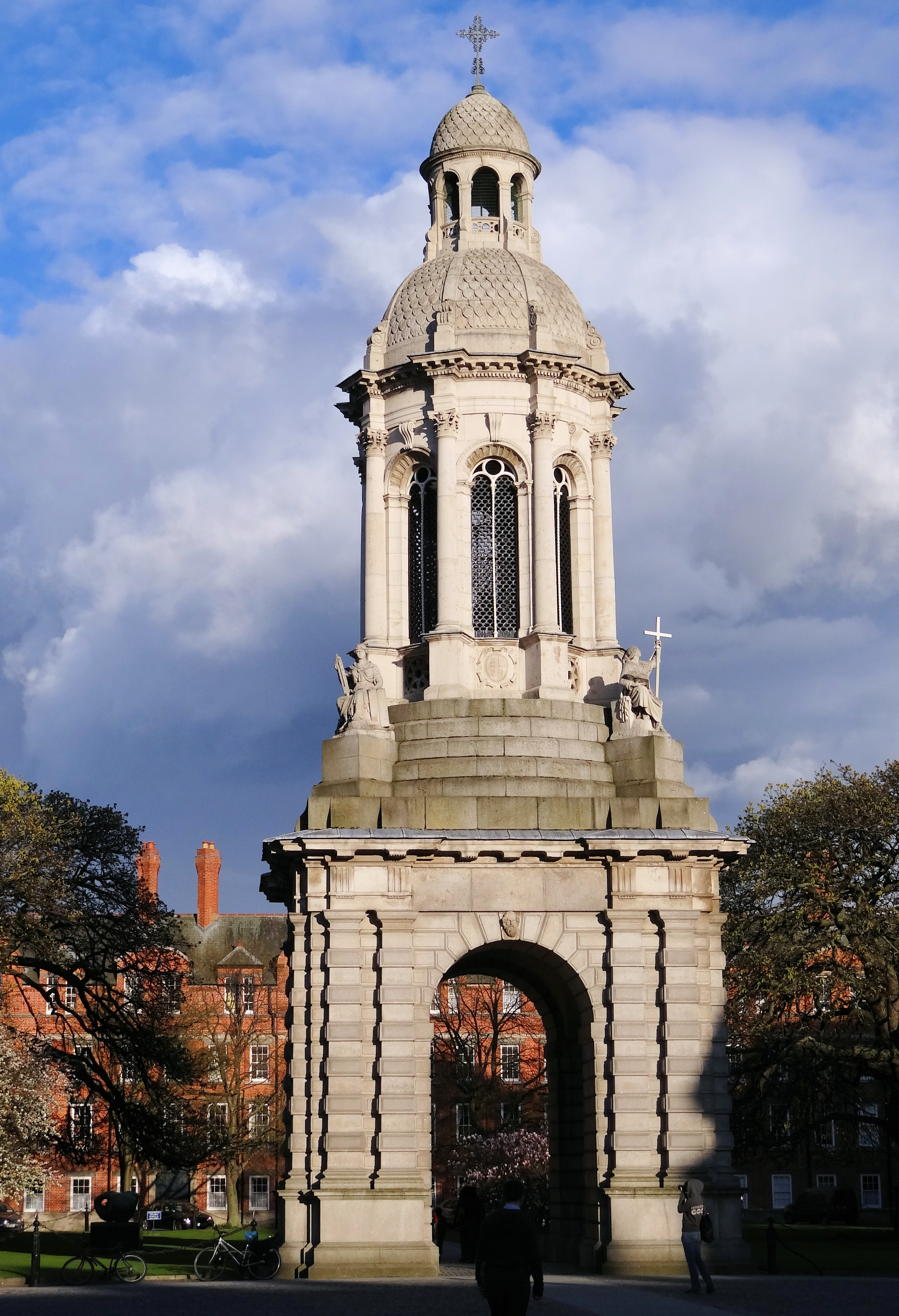
The Campanile of Trinity College, Dublin, designed by Lanyon.

Outside of Belfast, Lanyon is famous for planting the Frosses Trees in 1839. Lanyon planted approximately 1,500 Scots Pine trees along the edge of what is now the A26 road, just north of the town of Ballymena. The overhanging trees are a well-known landmark for travellers en route to the north Antrim coast. For safety reasons the majority of the original trees have been cut down, with just 104 remaining.

The Campanile of the University of Dublin, Trinity College, was designed by Lanyon and completed in 1853.

Lanyon designed an extension to the east side of The Royal St. George Yacht Club in Kingstown (now Dún Laoghaire) in 1865 which was accepted in principle. However uproar was caused at Committee level by the proposal, and it was rejected in favour of an alternative proposal by E.T. Owen.

Lanyon redesigned Killyleagh Castle and designed Drenagh Estate, bridges, viaducts and mausoleums and over 50 churches in Belfast and throughout Ireland.

== Legacy ==
Alongside William J. Barre, Lanyon is considered Belfast's most important architect of the Victorian era. During this period Belfast was expanding greatly, becoming Ireland's most important industrial city, briefly becoming larger in population than Dublin. Lanyon formed a partnership in 1854 with his former apprentice William Henry Lynn. In 1860 the two incorporated with Charles' son John Lanyon as Lanyon, Lynn & Lanyon, Civil Engineers and Architects. Lanyon, Lynn & Lanyon was dissolved in 1872.

A blue plaque commemorating Lanyon is displayed at his former offices in Wellington Place. The location of Belfast's Waterfront Hall was named Lanyon Place in his honour. The Sir Charles Lanyon Memorial Prize is awarded to a final-year BSc Architecture student from the School of Architecture at Queen's University each year.

Coat of arms of Charles Lanyon

Notes
Confirmed by Sir Arthur Edward Vicars, Ulster King of Arms, on 21 December 1896.
Crest
On a mount Vert a falcon rising Proper belled and jessed Or.
Torse
Of the colours.
Escutcheon
Gules on waves of the sea Azure a castle of two towers Or on the battlements thereof a falcon rising all Proper on a chief Or a pallet between two gyrons of the field.
Motto
Justus Ac Tenax

Civic offices
Preceded by Edward Coey	Mayor of Belfast; 1862–1863	Succeeded by John Lyttle
Parliament of the United Kingdom
Preceded by Hugh Cairns; Samuel Getty	Member of Parliament for Belfast; 1866 – 1868; With: Samuel Getty	Succeeded by William Johnston; Thomas McClure
Professional and academic associations
Preceded by Ulick de Burgh, 1st Marquess of Clanricarde	President of the Royal Institute of the Architects of Ireland; 1863–1868	Succeeded by Thomas Deane
