= General Michel =

General Michel may refer to:

- John Michel (1804–1886), British Army general
- John Michel (British Army officer, born 1765) (1765–1844), British Army general
- Victor-Constant Michel (1850–1937), French Army general
