= 1878 Belfast by-election =

UK Parliamentary by-election

The 1878 Belfast by-election was held on 2 April 1878. The by-election was held due to the resignation (Inspector of Fisheries in Ireland) of the incumbent Conservative MP, William Johnston. It was won by the Conservative candidate William Ewart.
