= Richard Davison (politician) =

British politician

Richard Davison (1796 – 20 February 1869) was a Belfast solicitor and Conservative politician.

Davison was Member of Parliament (MP) for Belfast from 1852 to 1860, when he resigned his seat. A defender of the established church in Ireland, in 1863 Davison read a paper 'On the present position of the Irish Church' to the 5th annual conference of the united dioceses of Down, Connor and Dromore.

Richard was the 3rd son of Alexander Davison of Knockboy, Broughshane, County Antrim, and his wife Mary née McKillop. He died at Cultra, County Down, and was buried in the Presbyterian churchyard in Broughshane. In 1822 he married Margaret, 4th and youngest daughter of George Casement of Larne, County Antrim; she died in 1847.

Parliament of the United Kingdom
Preceded by Robert Tennent; Lord John Chichester	Member of Parliament for Belfast; 1852 – 1860; With: Hugh Cairns	Succeeded by Hugh Cairns; Samuel Gibson Getty
