= John McCance =

Irish politician, died 1835

- Born: 1772; Farmhill, Ireland
- Died: 11 August 1835 (aged 62–63)
- Education: Belfast Academy
- Occupation: politician
- Years active: 1835–1835
- Known for: MP for Belfast
- Notable work: High Sheriff of County Down and County Antrim
- Political party: Whigs

John McCance (1772 – 11 August 1835) was an Irish politician.

Born in Farmhill, McCance was educated at the Belfast Academy and then worked in his uncle's linen business. He lived at Suffolk House for many years, and rebuilt the property in 1824. From 1821, he was a partner in what became the Northern Bank, chairing its management committee. He became a magistrate in 1801, was High Sheriff of County Down in 1825, and High Sheriff of County Antrim in 1827.

McCance stood in the 1835 UK general election in Belfast for the Whigs. He won the seat, but died later in the year. He is buried in Kensal Green Cemetery in London.

Parliament of the United Kingdom
| Preceded by Arthur Chichester; James Emerson Tennent | Member of Parliament for Belfast; 1835 – 1835; With: James Emerson Tennent | Succeeded by George Dunbar; James Emerson Tennent |
