= Richard Smyth (minister) =

Richard Smyth (4 October 1826 – 4 December 1878) was a minister of the Presbyterian Church in Ireland and politician.

== Life ==
Smyth, son of Hugh Smyth of Bushmills, County Antrim, by Sarah Anne, daughter of J. Wray, was born at Dervock, County Antrim, on 4 October 1826. He was educated at the University of Bonn and at the University of Glasgow, where he graduated M.A. in 1850, and received the honorary D.D. and LL.D. degrees in 1867.

For eight years he was assistant-collegiate minister of the First Presbyterian Church of Londonderry, and in 1865 was appointed professor of oriental languages and biblical literature in Magee College, Londonderry. In 1870 he became Dill professor of theology in the same college. He served as Secretary of the College in 1869-70 and as its President in 1873 and 1877-78. He was a supporter of Gladstone's policy of disestablishment in Ireland, and in 1869 was raised to the moderatorship of the general assembly of the Presbyterian church. In 1870 he was re-elected moderator, and took an active part in settling the financial affairs of the church in connection with the withdrawal of the Regium Donum. He was one of the trustees incorporated by royal charter under the Presbyterian Church Act for administering the commutation fund.

He supported the Irish University Bill of 1873, and, as a Liberal, was elected member of parliament for County Londonderry on 16 Feb. 1874 to support the general policy of Mr. Gladstone's administration, especially with respect to land tenure and grand jury reform.

He sat until his death, which took place at Antrim Road, Belfast, on 4 December 1878 aged 52. He was buried at Dervock on 6 December.

== Publications ==
Besides numerous pamphlets, he was the author of: 1. ‘Philanthropy, Proselytism, and Crime: a Review of the Irish Reformatory System,’ London, 1861, 8vo. 2. ‘The Bartholomew Expulsion in 1662,’ Londonderry, 1862, 18mo.

== Notes ==
Academic offices
New title	Professor of Oriental Literature and Hermeneutics at Magee College, Derry, County Londonderry; 1865-70	Succeeded by John James Given
Preceded by Samuel Marcus Dill	Professor of Theology at Magee College, Derry, County Londonderry; 1870-78	Succeeded by Thomas Croskery
Presbyterian Church titles
Preceded by Charles Lucas Morell (1868)	Moderator of the Presbyterian Church in Ireland; 1869–1870	Succeeded by Lowry Edmonds Berkley (1871)
Parliament of the United Kingdom
Preceded by Robert Peel Dawson; Sir Frederick Heygate, 2nd Bt	Member of Parliament for Londonderry; 1874 – 1878; With: Hugh Law	Succeeded by Sir Thomas McClure, 1st Bt; Hugh Law
