= William Gillilan Johnson =

Irish politician and barrister

Member of Parliament for Belfast
- In office 10 July 1841 – 1 August 1842 Serving with James Emerson Tennent
- Preceded by: George Dunbar; James Emerson Tennent
- Succeeded by: David Robert Ross; James Emerson Tennent

Personal details
- Born: 1808
- Died: 9 April 1886 (aged 77–78)
- Party: Conservative

Sir William Gillilan Johnson (1808 – 9 April 1886) was an Irish Conservative politician and barrister.

He was elected Conservative MP for Belfast at the 1841 general election but unseated in August 1842.

He was also Mayor of Belfast City Council in 1849.

Parliament of the United Kingdom
Preceded by George Dunbar; James Emerson Tennent	Member of Parliament for Belfast; 1841–1842; With: James Emerson Tennent	Succeeded by David Robert Ross; James Emerson Tennent
