= John Michel (British Army officer, born 1765) =

General John Michel (10 February 1765 – 5 April 1844) was a British Army officer.

== Biography ==
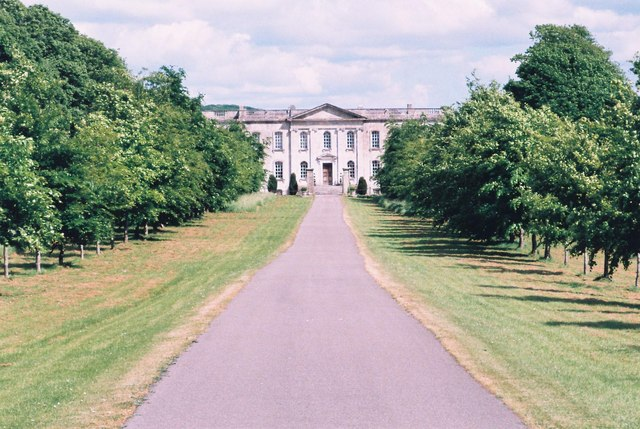
Kingston Russell House

He was born the son of David Robert Michel, MP of Kingston Russell House, Dorset, a colonel in the Dorset Militia and inherited the Mountain River estate in St John, Jamaica, from his father-in-law, John Ayscough, receiving the compensation when the slaves were freed.

On 1 February 1781 he was appointed ensign in the 51st Regiment of Foot. He served at the siege of Fort St Philip, Minorca, and was taken prisoner on its surrender. In June 1785 he succeeded to a lieutenancy in the 51st, and in July 1790 was appointed captain in the 4th Dragoon Guards. Captain Michel served two years on the staff as aide-de-camp to the Lord Lieutenant of Ireland, and in October 1793 succeeded to a majority, then in August 1796 to a lieutenant-colonelcy in the 4th Dragoon Guards. In 1801 he exchanged into the 14th Light Dragoons; on 29 April 1802 he received the brevet of colonel, and in October 1804 was appointed brigadier-general on the staff in Ireland, where he continued until June 1805. In February 1807 he was re-appointed to the Irish staff; on 25 October 1809 he was promoted to major-general, and to lieutenant general on 4 June 1814. He was promoted full general on 8 June 1837.

He served as the Member of Parliament for Belfast from 1812 to 1818.

He died in 1844 and was buried at Dewlish. He had married firstly Elizabeth, the daughter of Pierce Crosbie of Ballyheigue Castle, County Kerry and secondly Anne, the daughter of Hon. Henry Fane, with whom he had three sons and two daughters. His son became Field Marshal John Michel.

Parliament of the United Kingdom
Preceded by Stephen Edward May	Member of Parliament for Belfast; 1816 – 1818	Succeeded by Arthur Chichester
