= David Robert Ross =

Irish Whig politician and army officer

Member of Parliament for Belfast
- In office 19 August 1842 – 9 August 1847 Serving with John Chichester (1845–1847); James Emerson Tennent (1842–1845)
- Preceded by: William Gillilan Johnson; James Emerson Tennent
- Succeeded by: Robert James Tennent; John Chichester

Personal details
- Born: 1797
- Died: 27 July 1851 (aged 53–54)
- Party: Whig

David Robert Ross (1797 – 27 July 1851) was an Irish Whig politician and army officer.

After unsuccessfully contesting the constituency at the 1841 general election, he was elected Whig MP for Belfast at a by-election in 1842—caused by the previous poll being declared void—and held the seat until 1847 when he did not seek re-election.

Parliament of the United Kingdom
Preceded by William Gillilan Johnson; James Emerson Tennent	Member of Parliament for Belfast; 1842–1847; With: James Emerson Tennent (1842–1845); John Chichester (1845–1847)	Succeeded by Robert James Tennent; John Chichester
