= Hugh Cairns, 1st Earl Cairns =

Irish-born British statesman

The Right Honourable The Earl Cairns PC
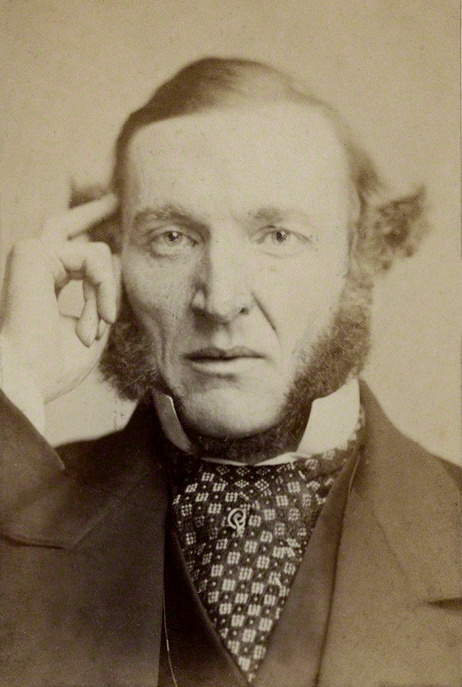

Lord Chancellor
- In office 29 February 1868 – 1 December 1868
- Monarch: Victoria
- Prime Minister: Benjamin Disraeli
- Preceded by: The Lord Chelmsford
- Succeeded by: The Lord Hatherley
- In office 21 February 1874 – 21 April 1880
- Monarch: Victoria
- Prime Minister: The Earl of Beaconsfield
- Preceded by: The Lord Selborne
- Succeeded by: The Lord Selborne

Personal details
- Born: 27 December 1819 Cultra, County Down, Ireland
- Died: 2 April 1885 (aged 65) Bournemouth, Hampshire, England
- Party: Conservative
- Spouse: Mary Harriet MacNeile (m. 1856)
- Children: 7
- Education: Trinity College Dublin

Hugh McCalmont Cairns, 1st Earl Cairns PC (27 December 1819 – 2 April 1885) was an Scot-Irish statesman who served as Lord High Chancellor of Great Britain during the first two ministries of Benjamin Disraeli. He was one of the most prominent Conservative statesmen in the House of Lords during this period of Victorian politics. He served as the seventeenth Chancellor of the University of Dublin between 1867 and 1885.

== Background and education ==
Cairns was born at Cultra, County Down, Ireland. His father, William Cairns, formerly a captain in the 47th regiment, came from a family of Scottish origin which moved to Ireland around 1715. Hugh Cairns was the second son, and was educated at Belfast Academy and at Trinity College Dublin, graduating with a senior moderatorship in classics in 1838. In 1844, he was called to the Bar by the Middle Temple, to which he had moved from Lincoln's Inn.

== Legal and political career ==
During his first years at the Chancery Bar, Cairns showed little eloquence. He was so slow and diffident that he feared for his legal career. However, in 1852, he entered parliament as member for Belfast, and he became a QC in 1856. In 1858, Cairns was appointed Solicitor-General and was knighted.

In May of that year, he made two of his most brilliant and best-remembered speeches in the House of Commons. In the first, he defended the action of Lord Ellenborough, who, as President of the Board of Control, had not only censured Lord Canning for a proclamation issued by him as Governor-General of India but had made public the despatch in which the censure was conveyed. On the other occasion referred to, Cairns spoke in opposition to Lord John Russell's amendment to the motion for the second reading of the government Reform Bill, winning the approval of Benjamin Disraeli. Disraeli's appreciation found an opportunity for displaying itself some years later, when in 1868 he invited him to be Lord Chancellor in the brief Conservative administration which followed Lord Derby's resignation of the party leadership. Meanwhile, Cairns had maintained his reputation in debate, both when his party was in power and when it was in opposition.

In 1866, Lord Derby, returning to office, appointed Cairns Attorney General, and in the same year he had availed himself of a vacancy to seek the comparative rest of the Court of Appeal. While a Lord Justice he had been offered a peerage, and though at first unable to accept it, he had finally done so when a relative provided the means necessary for the endowment of a title. The appointment of Baron Cairns as Lord Chancellor in 1868 meant superseding Lord Chelmsford, an act apparently carried out by Disraeli with little tact. Chelmsford declared that he had been sent away with less courtesy than if he had been a butler, but the testimony of Lord Malmesbury is that the affair was the result of an understanding arrived at when Lord Chelmsford took office. Disraeli held office on this occasion for only a few months. In 1869, Cairns succeeded Lord Malmesbury as the leader of the Conservative opposition in the House of Lords.

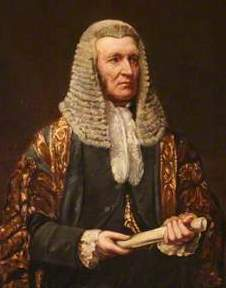
Lord Cairns as Lord Chancellor, by Lowes Cato Dickinson

He had distinguished himself in the Commons by his resistance to the Roman Catholics Oath Bill brought in 1865; in the Lords, his efforts on behalf of the Church of Ireland were equally strenuous. His speech on Gladstone's Suspensory Bill was afterwards published as a pamphlet, but the attitude which he and the peers who followed him had taken up, in insisting on their amendments to the preamble of the bill, was one difficult to maintain, and Lord Cairns made terms with Lord Granville in circumstances which precluded his consulting his party first. He issued a circular to explain his action. The incident appears to have demonstrated his statesmanship, for he secured concessions which would have been irretrievably lost by continued opposition. Not long after this, Lord Cairns resigned the leadership of his party in the upper house, but resumed it in 1870 and opposed the Irish Land Bill in that year. Upon the Conservatives' return to power in 1874, he again became Lord Chancellor; in 1878 he was created Viscount Garmoyle and Earl Cairns; and, in 1880, his party went out of office.

In opposition he did not take as prominent a part as previously, but when Disraeli (by then created Earl of Beaconsfield) died in 1881, there were some Conservatives who considered that his claim to lead the party was better than that of Lord Salisbury. His health, never robust, had for many years shown intermittent signs of failing. He had periodically made enforced retirements to the Riviera, and for many years had had a house at Bournemouth, where he died.

Lord Cairns was a great supporter of Barnardo's and was called upon by Dr. Thomas John Barnardo to open his first girl's home at Barkingside, Ilford, Essex, on 9 July 1876. Today Cairns house still stands on the one remaining green at Barkingside which was built by the children of England in memory of the First President of Dr Barnardo's Homes, The Right Honourable Earl Cairns. Cairns House was officially opened 6 August 1887.

== Legacy ==
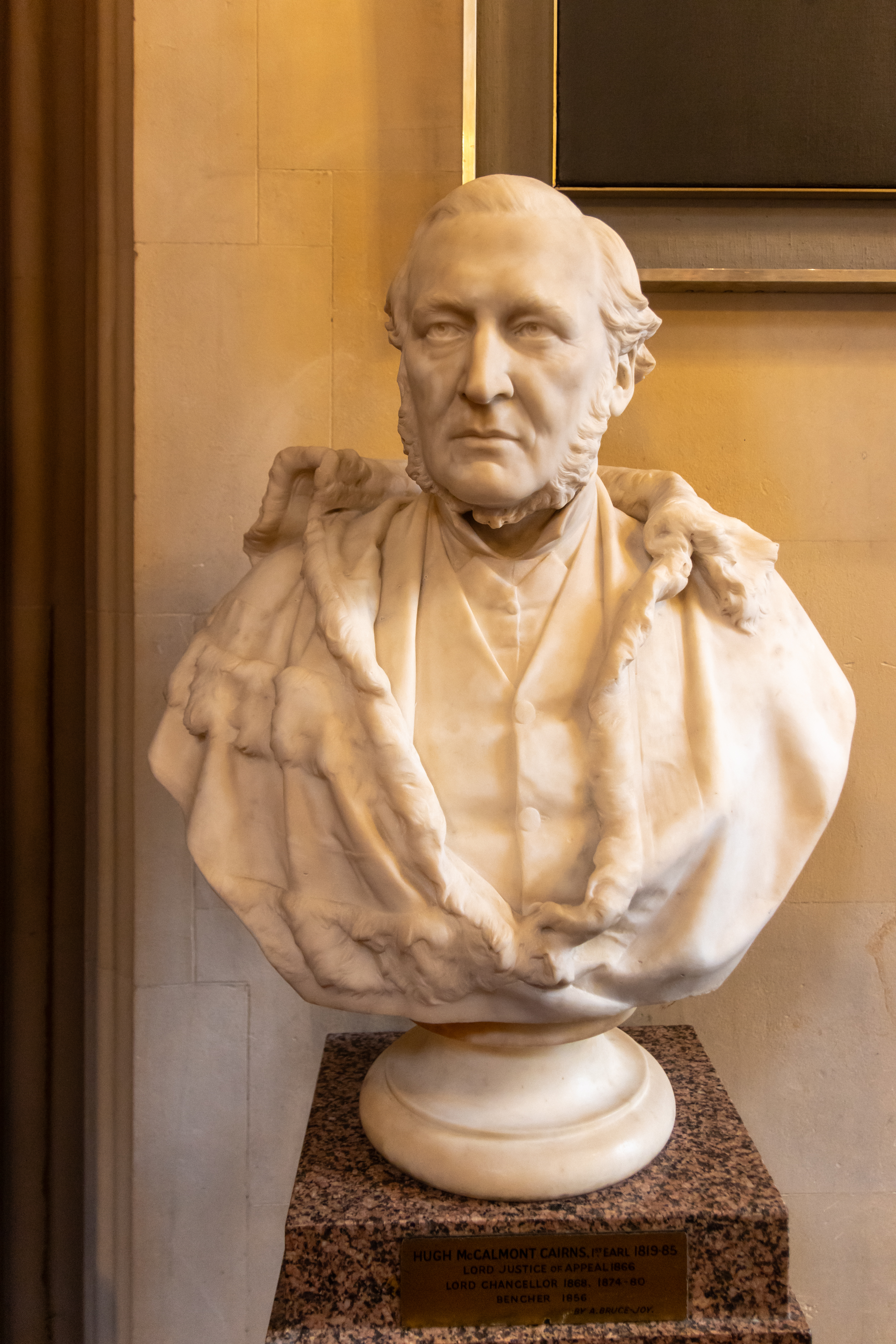
Bust at Lincoln's Inn

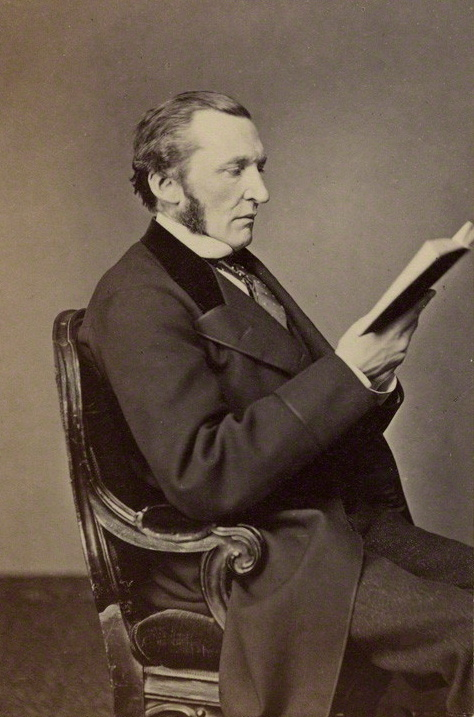
Lord Cairns in the 1860s

His influence upon the legislation of the day was largely felt where questions affecting religion and the Church were involved and in matters peculiarly affecting his own profession. His power was felt, as has been said, both when he was in office and when his party was in opposition. He had been chairman of the committee on judicature reform, and although he was not in office when the Judicature Acts were passed, all the reforms in the legal procedure of his day owed much to him. He took part, when out of office, in the passing of the Married Women's Property Act 1882, and was directly responsible for the Conveyancing Acts, and for the Settled Land Act. Many other statutes in which be was largely concerned might be quoted. His judgments are to be found in the Law Reports and those who wish to consider his oratory should read the speeches above referred to, or that delivered in the House of Lords on the Compensation for Disturbance Bill in 1880, and his memorable criticism of Mr Gladstone's policy in the Transvaal, after Majuba Hill.

== Family ==
Lord Cairns married, in 1856, Mary Harriet, eldest daughter of John MacNeile, of County Antrim, by whom he had five sons and two daughters:

- Hugh Cairns (died 1858), died in infancy
- Lady Lilias Charlotte Cairns (1860–1889), married Rev. Henry Nevile Sherbrooke
- Arthur William Cairns (1861–1890), 2nd Earl Cairns
- Herbert John Cairns (1863–1905), 3rd Earl Cairns
- Wilfred Dallas Cairns (1865–1946), 4th Earl Cairns
- Douglas Halyburton Cairns (1867–1936), married Lady Constance Anne Montagu Douglas Scott, daughter of William Montagu Douglas Scott, 6th Duke of Buccleuch
- Lady Kathleen Mary Cairns (1870–1939), married Archdeacon Edward Eliot

Parliament of the United Kingdom
Preceded by Lord John Chichester; Robert James Tennent	Member of Parliament for Belfast; 1852–1866; With: Richard Davison (until 1860); Samuel Gibson Getty (from 1860)	Succeeded by Samuel Gibson Getty; Charles Lanyon
Legal offices
Preceded by Sir Henry Singer Keating	Solicitor General; 1858–1859	Succeeded by Sir Henry Singer Keating
Preceded by Sir Roundell Palmer	Attorney General; 1866	Succeeded by Sir John Rolt
Political offices
Preceded by The Lord Chelmsford	Lord High Chancellor of Great Britain; 1868	Succeeded by The Lord Hatherley
Preceded by The Lord Selborne	Lord High Chancellor of Great Britain; 1874–1880	Succeeded by The Lord Selborne
Party political offices
Preceded by The Earl of Malmesbury	Leader of the Conservative Party in the House of Lords; 1869–1870	Succeeded by The Duke of Richmond
Academic offices
Preceded by 3rd Earl of Rosse	Chancellor of the University of Dublin; 1868–1885	Succeeded by 4th Earl of Rosse
Peerage of the United Kingdom
New creation	Earl Cairns; 1878–1885	Succeeded by Arthur Cairns
New creation	Baron Cairns; 1867–1885	Succeeded by Arthur Cairns
