= Hugh Law =

Irish lawyer and politician (1818–1883)

Hugh Law, PC (Ire), QC (19 June 1818 – 10 September 1883) was an Irish lawyer, politician and Lord Chancellor of Ireland.

Born in County Down, son of John Law of Woodlawn and Margaret Crawley of Cullaville, Law was educated at the Royal School, Dungannon, and thereafter at Trinity College Dublin, where he was elected a Scholar in 1837 and received a Bachelor of Arts in 1839. He became a barrister in 1840 and a Queen's Counsel in 1860, practising mainly in Dublin and specialising in equity.

In politics, he started as a Conservative, but quickly turned to the Liberals. He drafted the Irish Church Act 1869 which disestablished the Church of Ireland: the drafting has been called "a monument to his skill and learning". He was also largely responsible for the drafting of the Landlord and Tenant (Ireland) Act 1870, and during the passage of the Land Law (Ireland) Act 1881 was noted for his conciliatory approach and willingness to accept Opposition amendments.

He became Law Adviser to the Lord Lieutenant of Ireland, Lord Spencer, in 1868. He became a Bencher of the King's Inns in 1870 and was appointed in turn Solicitor-General for Ireland in 1872, Attorney-General for Ireland in 1873, and a member of the Irish Privy Council on 24 February 1874.His promotion was regarded as a proper reward for his services to the Liberals, despite the practical problem that until 1874 he did not have a seat in Parliament and therefore could not speak for the Government in the Commons. In 1874 he was elected a Member of Parliament for County Londonderry. He was appointed Attorney-General by the Liberal Prime Minister Gladstone in 1880, before becoming Lord Chancellor of Ireland in 1881.As Attorney General he prosecuted Charles Stewart Parnell and other leading members of the Irish National Land League for conspiracy.

== Death ==
Hugh Law died suddenly aged 65 on 10 September 1883, from inflammation of the lungs, at Rathmullan, County Donegal.was remembered as a judge whose decisions commanded universal respect.

== Family ==
He married Helen Maria White, daughter of William White of Dublin, on 17 March 1863; she died in 1875. His eldest son later bought the historic Ardbraccan House, the former palace of the Lord Bishop of Meath, from the Church of Ireland.

His second son, also called Hugh Law, sat initially as a Nationalist MP in the House of Commons and later served in Dáil Éireann as a Cumann na nGaedheal TD from June 1927 until 1932.

== Arms ==
Coat of arms of Hugh Law
| Notes Confirmed by Sir Nevile Rodwell Wilkinson, 16th March 1934. Crest A cock crowing Proper. Escutcheon Argent a bend Gules charged with the Roman fasces Proper in chief a cock of the second. Motto Vigilante Et Orate |

Parliament of the United Kingdom
| Preceded by Robert Peel Dawson; Sir Frederick Heygate, Bt | Member of Parliament for County Londonderry; 1874–1881; With: Richard Smyth 1874–1878; Sir Thomas McClure, Bt 1878–1881 | Succeeded by Sir Thomas McClure, Bt; Andrew Marshall Porter |
Legal offices
| Preceded by Christopher Palles | Solicitor General for Ireland; 1872–1874 | Succeeded by Henry Ormsby |
| Preceded by Christopher Palles | Attorney General for Ireland; 1874 | Succeeded by John Thomas Ball |
| Preceded by Edward Gibson | Attorney General for Ireland; 1880–1881 | Succeeded by William Moore Johnson |
Political offices
| Preceded by The Lord O'Hagan | Lord Chancellor of Ireland; 1881–1883 | Succeeded by Sir Edward Sullivan, Bt |
