= Robert James Tennent =

Irish Whig politician

Member of Parliament for Belfast
- In office 9 August 1847 – 13 July 1852 Serving with John Chichester
- Preceded by: John Chichester; David Robert Ross
- Succeeded by: Richard Davison; Hugh Cairns

Personal details
- Born: 1803
- Died: 25 May 1880 (aged 76)
- Party: Whig

Robert James Tennent (1803 – 25 May 1880) was an Irish Whig politician who, in the cause of reform, in 1832 contested Belfast's first competitive parliamentary election. Breaking the Tory hold on the town, he was eventually returned as a Member of Parliament from Belfast in 1847.

== Early life and education ==
Born in Belfast and the son of Robert Tennent, medical doctor, merchant, and philanthropist, and Eliza née Macrone, Tennent was educated at the Royal Belfast Academical Institution and in Trinity College Dublin.

== Political career ==
In 1824, with his friend James Emerson, he volunteered to join the Greeks in their War of Independence. For Tennent, it was with conviction that having "learned too feelingly the black consequences of slavery by the wretched example of may own country", Ireland, he could not "remain a passive spectator of the conflict". He was soon disillusioned by the Greek insurgents, concluding that, beyond emancipation from the Turks, they had "no idea of true liberty".

In 1832, the two friends contested Belfast's first competitive parliamentary election. Emerson (who having married an heiress cousin of Tennent's, was now James Emerson Tennent) stood the interest of the town's proprietor, Lord Donegall, as an Independent Whig (but subsequently took the Tory Whip). In the cause of reform, Tennent stood as a Whig and lost. A Protestant loyalist mob celebrated his defeat with an attack on the central Catholic district (Hercules Street) and with an attempt to ransack Tennent's house.

In 1826 Tennent had been admitted to Lincoln's Inn. He was called to the Irish Bar In 1833 he was called to the Irish Bar and to the English Bar in 1834.

Tennent succeeded in being elected a Whig Member of Parliament (MP) for Belfast at the 1847 general election and held the seat until 1852, when he was defeated again by a Tory.

== Personal life ==
In 1830 he married Eliza, daughter of John McCracken and niece of the United Irishman Henry Joy McCracken (hanged in 1798) and campaigner Mary Ann McCracken. They had at least two children Robert Tennent, and Letitia whose son Henry Harrison became an Irish Nationalist (Parnellite) MP and daughter Sarah Cecilia Harrison, was an artist and the first woman to be elected to serve on Dublin City Council.

Parliament of the United Kingdom
Preceded by John Chichester; David Robert Ross	Member of Parliament for Belfast; 1847–1852; With: John Chichester	Succeeded by Richard Davison; Hugh Cairns
