= Emerson Tennent baronets =

Extinct baronetcy in the Baronetage of the United Kingdom

The Emerson Tennent Baronetcy, of Tempo Manor in the Chapelry of Tempo in the County of Fermanagh, was a title in the Baronetage of the United Kingdom. It was created on 14 February 1867 for the Irish politician and traveller James Emerson Tennent. Born James Emerson, he married the daughter of William Tennant, a wealthy Belfast merchant, and assumed by Royal licence the additional surname of Tennent. The title became extinct on the death of his son, the second Baronet, in 1876.

== Emerson Tennent baronets, of Tempo Manor (1867) ==
- Sir James Emerson Tennent, 1st Baronet (1804–1869)
- Sir William Emerson Tennent, 2nd Baronet (1835–1876)
