= William Johnston (Irish politician) =

Irish politician

Member of Parliament for Belfast
- In office 1868–1878
- Parliamentary group: Conservative

Member of Parliament for Belfast South
- In office 1885–1902
- Parliamentary group: Conservative, Irish Unionist Alliance

Personal details
- Born: 22 February 1829 Downpatrick, Ireland
- Died: 17 July 1902 (aged 73) Ballykilbeg, County Down
- Spouse(s): Harriet Allen (d.); Arminella Frances Drew (d.); Georgiana Barbara Hay
- Relations: Charles Johnston (son)
- Education: Trinity College Dublin; King's Inns
- Profession: Barrister

William Johnston (22 February 1829 – 17 July 1902) was an Irish Orangeman, unionist and Member of Parliament for Belfast, distinguished by his independent working-class following and commitment to reform. He first entered the United Kingdom Parliament as an Irish Conservative in 1868, celebrated for having broken a standing ban on Orange Order processions and as the nominee of an association of "Protestant Workers". At Westminster, Johnston supported the secret ballot; the accommodation of trade unions and strike action; land reform; and women's suffrage. He was succeeded in 1902 as the MP for South Belfast, by Thomas Sloan, similarly supported by loyalist workers in opposition to the conservative and unionist candidates favoured by their employers.

== Orangeman ==
Johnston was the eldest son of John Brett Johnston of Ballykilbeg, outside Downpatrick, County Down, and his wife Thomasina Anne Brunette Scott, daughter of Thomas Scott, communicants of the established Church of Ireland. He was educated at Trinity College Dublin being awarded B.A. in 1852 and M.A. in 1856. While in Dublin, he drew close to leading Church of Ireland evangelists, among them Edward Nangle, founder of the Achill Mission. In 1853, he inherited his father's small heavily encumbered estate.

His great-grandfather, William Johnston of Killough, is credited with being the founder in 1733 of the first Orange Society in Ireland, the Loyal Society of Blue and Orange. Johnston joined the Orange Order in May 1848, the same year he entered Trinity. He wrote ultra-Protestant tracts and evangelical-themed gothic novels, and for several years (1855-1862) ran a newspaper, the Downshire Protestant. In 1857, he was elected Sovereign Grand Master of the Royal Black Institution (a senior Orange fraternity) and stood unsuccessfully for nomination to parliament at Downpatrick. In 1866,

Johnston asserted that Roman Catholicism ("Popery") was not merely a religion, but a "religio-political system for the enslavement of the body and soul of man". It could be countered only by "such a combination as the Orange Society based on religion and carrying over religion into the politics of the day".

His militancy placed him at odds with the aristocratic leadership of the Orange Order. Since the Fenian-organised funeral in Dublin for Terence McManus in 1861, Johnston had been asking: "If Nationalists are allowed such mobilisation, why are loyal Orangemen not allowed to march freely". On the Orange Twelfth 1867, he forced the issue by leading a large procession of Orangemen from Bangor to Newtownards in County Down. The contravention of the Party Procession Act earned him a two month prison sentence.

== Parliamentary career ==
=== Candidate of the Protestant working man ===
Following his release and triumphal reception in the Ulster Hall, Johnston was nominated by the United Protestant Workingmen’s Association (UPWA) as a Conservative candidate for Belfast in the 1868 parliamentary election, the first in which, thanks to the preceding Irish Reform Act, many of the town's skilled workingmen would exercise the vote. In the view of the Association, Johnston had been "betrayed and deserted by the aristocracy of Ulster on account of his thorough identification with the working classes of the province".

Conservative leaders refused to endorse his nomination and instead proposed the eminent architect Charles Lanyon and John Mulholland, the owner of the York Street Spinning Mill. Deserted by a large number of Orangemen, they still tried to break up the meetings of the Liberal candidate,Thomas McClure. But the Liberal editor of the Northern Whig, Thomas MacKnight, noted that "the Orange democracy on Mr. Johnston's side now gave those proceedings no countenance". An unprecedented understanding in the town's then two-member constituency between Johnston's camp and that of the largely Catholic-supported McClure, enabled Johnston to top the poll.

=== Land reform ===
Brokered by the MacKnight, Johnston's understanding with McClure included, addition to repeal of the Party Procession Act (achieved through a private member's bill in 1872), comprehensive land reform. In 1870, Johnston sided with the Liberal government of William Ewart Gladstone, and with the Irish Home Rule MPs, in voting for the first of the Irish Land Acts.

In 1871, he voted again for a Liberal measure, the Ballot Act 1872, widely expected to reduce the intimidatory power of landlords at the polls In the certainty that secret voting would "weaken the Protestant and Conservative interest", at Twelfth celebrations speakers assailed Johnston for failing to "represent the Orangemen of Ireland". Such was the disagreement, that Johnston briefly withdrew from the Order.

Recognising that the tenants protections afforded by the Landlord and Tenant (Ireland) Act 1870 were weak, Johnston continued to campaign on the central demands of the tenant rights associations (agreed in conference at Belfast in 1874). These were the three F's (free sale, fixity of tenure, and fair rent), which were eventually conceded in the Land Law (Ireland) Act 1881 and by Gladstone's Tenure of Land (Ireland) Bill 1890, which Johnston supported. In doing so, he broke with many of his Conservative Party colleagues. Pointing to Charles Stewart Parnell's direction of the Land League, they persisted in identifying tenant-righters with Catholic nationalists and their separatist cause.

In 1901, he did follow his party in voting against the principle of "compulsory purchase" (of compelling landlords to sell to their tenants) advanced with the support of both Catholic and Protestant farmers by the Independent Unionist, T. W. Russell. In his last appearance on election hustings, in February 1902 Johnston, on orders from Lord Arthur Hill and the Marquess of Londonderry, campaigned for the Conservative against the Russellite candidate in an East Down by-election.

=== Labour reform ===
In May 1870, a procession of different trades marched through Belfast to the laying of the foundation stone of the Working Men's Institute. Strikingly, the demonstration included Catholic and Protestant bands. On the occasion, Johnston declared:

I am proud today that the working classes of Belfast have set an example for the British Empire—each of you earnestly holding his own belief in religion and in politics and prepare to yield to no man at the proper time, in manfully asserting your beliefs and acting upon them—have united here today around the flag of "The United Working Classes of Belfast" determined to show that there are times and circumstances when religious differences and party creeds must be forgotten, and when it is the highest privilege of the citizen of a free state to unite with his fellow citizens in endeavouring to promote the common good and common welfare of all.

For Johnston this was not a rejection of Orangeism, for whose demonstrations there was a "proper time". Rather, it was a challenge to those within the Order for whom religious belief and party creed were standing objections to recognition of a common working-class interest—those who regarded a labour politics as tantamount to religious and national ecumenism.

In the 1874 general election, Johnston retained his Belfast seat as an official Conservative, but this was with the endorsement of a local party association reconstituted with a stipulation that two-thirds of voting members be working men. It was also the acceptance of a party at Westminster which, under the leadership of Benjamin Disraeli, in the Reform Act 1867 had already outbid the Liberals in pursuit of the working man's vote. The Conservative government that Johnston supported on Disraeli's return to office, engaged in an unprecedented "burst of social legislation": legalising and indemnifying trades unions, permitting peaceful picketing, limiting working hours, promoting slum clearance and establishing public health authorities.

Claiming, with the News Letter, that the limitations on working hours and on child labour "will ruin our trade and leave Belfast a forest of smokeless chimneys", Belfast mill owners sought exemption from the Factories (Health of Women, &c.) Act 1874. It was as spokesman "for the operatives of Belfast" and "in the interests of the working classes" that Johnston helped vote down their proposed amendments".

=== Woman's suffrage ===
As early as May 1871, Johnston declared himself a woman's suffragist. He voted a second reading for the Women's Disabilities (Removal) Bill (brought to parliament by Jacob Bright) which would have given women's access to the polls on the same term as men. In February 1871, he chaired the first meeting in Belfast of a woman's suffrage tour of Ireland undertaken by Isabella Tod, and attended the formation in Dublin of a committee (which he regularly attended with the Home Rule MP Maurice Brooks) from which emerged the Dublin Women's Suffrage Association.

In 1887, following extensive lobbying by the North of Ireland Women's Suffrage Society, which he had formed with Tod, Johnston piloted an amendment to the Municipal Corporations (Ireland) Act through Parliament. It ensured that the municipal franchise for the new "city" of Belfast conferred the rate-payer vote on persons rather than men.

In 1895, Johnston introduced a suffrage bill that specifically stated that any person in Ireland, regardless of sex or marital status, who was a ratepayer or who was entitled to vote for Guardians of the Poor, should receive both local and national franchise rights. That year, he also assisted in passing the Poor Law (Ireland) (Women) Act that ensured that women ratepayers could stand as Poor Law Guardians under the same conditions as men.

In February 1897, Johnston sought to extend the municipal franchise to women in the Irish capital through an amendment to a Dublin Corporation bill. His republican and Land-League nemesis in the Commons, Michael Davitt, expressed his "cordial sympathy" for the motion, but appealed to Johnston "not to persevere with it to the extent of endangering this Bill". He "regretted very much that the citizens of Dublin had not a sufficiently progressive spirit" to follow "the example of Belfast". Two weeks before, Johnston had supported yet another effort to extend the parliamentary franchise.

=== Defence of the Union ===
In March 1878, Johnston resigned from Parliament to take the position of Inspector of Fisheries in Ireland, an instance, according to the historian Paul Bew, of his being "bought off" by government patronage. In his absence, however, his supporters defied the Conservative "bigwigs": albeit without success, UPWA ran its own candidates to replace him in 1878 and again in 1880. Johnston held his government post until dismissed in 1885 because of the "inflammatory" and party-political nature of a number of speeches he had delivered denouncing the nationalist-led Land League and the Home Rule party.

At the 1885 general election, Johnston was returned to parliament for the new South Belfast constituency as an Independent Conservative member, in time to vote against Gladstone's first Home Rule Bill. Back in the Commons, Johnston proposed that if the bill passed that the "Protestants of Ulster;" would resist "at the point of the bayonet", and that they would be led by Lord Wolseley, the Adjutant-General to the Forces, "and 1,000 other officers" who were ready to "throw up their commissions". That Johnston, himself, had been involved in some form of military preparation against the prospect of a Dublin parliament is suggested by his decision to "stop drilling for the present", recorded in his dairy three days after the measure's defeat in June 1886.

Endorsed again by the local Conservative Party, and as a senior member of a new group of Irish unionist MPs at Westminster, the Irish Unionist Parliamentary Party, Johnston was re-elected unopposed in the next three elections, serving until his death in 1902.

As one "who was above all anxious to see the industrial and social progress of Ireland assured", Johnston objected to what he said was the nationalist policy of setting "everything in that direction" aside until Home Rule was achieved. But he made no concession to the goal itself. Some have credited him with coining the phrase that summarised blanket Orange resistance to the prospect of an Irish parliament: "Home Rule is Rome Rule".

== Commemoration and legacy ==
=== Orange and nationalist tributes ===
Johnston died at Ballykilbeg on 17 July 1902 after catching a "chill" at on Orange demonstration in Ballynahinch. He was buried at Rathmullen churchyard; a monument was erected over his grave by public subscription. In a cult that "prefigured that which was [later] generated around Sir Edward Carson", the leader of Ulster Unionism, his stature as an Orangeman, the hero of 1867, was celebrated in loyalist ballads and his "bearded and patriarchal features" appeared on Orange drums, collarettes and banners. Lodge 575 of the Royal Black Preceptory, in recognition of his commitment to the temperance movement, was named "William Johnston Memorial Total Abstinence".

The Belfast nationalist organ, The Irish News, commented that "Fierce politician though he was at times, [Johnston] was always kind and courteous to his political opponents". It noted in particular his acknowledged friendship with Joseph Biggar. Biggar, with whom Johnston attended meetings of Tod's Suffrage Society in Belfast, was the obstructionist leader of the Irish Nationalists in the House of Commons, and a Presbyterian convert to Roman Catholicism.

=== Reaction to his children's apostasy ===
Greater notice was given to Johnston's reaction to the conversion of his own daughter to the Roman Church. In April 1898, Miss Ada Johnston of Ballykilbeg, who had "been attending Catholic services for some time past", took her first Catholic communion at Patrick's Memorial Church, Downpatrick. Despite the expected embarrassment, her father was seen to regularly escort her to her chosen place of worship before proceeding to his own parish church. (A few years after his death, Ada returned to the Church of ireland).

His son Charles, and daughter Georgiana, strayed even further from their father's evangelical Protestant convictions. Johnston had hoped that his son would enter the Church of Ireland, but a scholar of Sanskrit, Charles Johnston became a devotee of Madame Blavatsky (whose niece he married) and, with his sister (and with his former school companion, William Butler Yeats), of her syncretic Theosophy. The elder Johnston described this as giving him "great pain". Johnston's eldest son, Lewis, who was to become Postmaster General of Hong Kong, did follow him into the Orange Order, but was also to express an interest in the esoteric and occult.

William, his youngest son, was also unpersuaded by Johnston's evangelical Protestantism. In 1892, he told his father he would not attend church again as he did not believe in any form of religion.

=== Successor ===
Following his return to Parliament in 1885, some historians suggest that Johnston's "fiery Orangeism" was "thoroughly harnessed" to conservative interests, so that in his later years he was "increasingly out of touch with popular protestantism". Accordingly, his death was an opportunity for "populist unionism" to reassert itself.

Johnston was succeeded in August 1902 as the MP for South Belfast, by Thomas Sloan. As Johnston had been in 1868, Sloan was supported by loyalist workers in opposition to the Conservative candidate favoured by their employers. Sanctioned by the Orange leadership, with R. Lindsay Crawford Sloan formed the Independent Orange Order. Together they supported dock and linen-mill workers in the Belfast Lockout of 1907.

== Family ==
Johnston married firstly in 1853, Harriet Allen daughter of Robert Allen of Kilkenny. She was the author of Lays of the Lost One and Other Poems (Dublin 1858). He married secondly in 1861 Arminella Frances Drew, daughter of the Rev. Thomas Drew, D.D. He married thirdly in 1863, Georgiana Barbara Hay, daughter of Sir John Hay, 5th baronet. She died in 1900. He was survived by six children from this marriage, four daughters and two sons. These included Ada Johnston, the daughter who took Roman Catholic communion, and the writer and theosophist, Charles Johnston.

== Papers and publications ==
- Protestant Work to be Done (1853)
- The Nunnery Question 1854
- Narmo and Aimata, a tale of the Jesuits in Tahiti 1855
- Nightshade 1857
- The Boyne Book of Poetry and Song (editor) (1859
- Popish Tyranny, and God-sent deliverance, or the days of William the Third, a lecture (1860)
- Speeches (1869)
- Under Which King? (originally serialised in Downshire Protestant) 1873

== Notes ==
- Leigh Rayment's Historical List of MPs

Parliament of the United Kingdom
Preceded by Charles Lanyon and Samuel Gibson Getty	Member of Parliament for Belfast; 1868 – 1878; With: Thomas McClure 1868–1874; James Porter Corry 1874–1878	Succeeded by James Porter Corry and Charles Lanyon
New constituency from part of Belfast	Member of Parliament for Belfast South; 1885 – 1902	Succeeded by Thomas Sloan
Non-profit organization positions
Preceded by Thomas Johnston	Sovereign Grand Master of the Royal Black Preceptory; 1857–1902	Succeeded by Hunt Walsh Chambre
