= Robert Peel Dawson =

English-Irish politician

Colonel Robert Peel Dawson (1818 – 2 September 1877) was an Irish Member of the House of Commons at Westminster.

He was one of the Dawson family of Castledawson and lived at Moyola Park, County Londonderry. He was the son of The Rt. Hon. George Robert Dawson and Mary Peel, daughter of Sir Robert Peel, 1st Baronet and sister of Prime Minister of the United Kingdom Sir Robert Peel, 2nd Baronet. He served as an officer in the 11th Hussars.

He was appointed High Sheriff of County Londonderry for 1850 and served as MP for County Londonderry from 1859 to 1874. He was appointed Honorary Colonel of the Londonderry Militia in 1871.

His daughter, Mary, married Lord Adolphus John Spencer Churchill Chichester, younger son of Lord Donegall; thus his grandson was the South Londonderry MP Robert Chichester and his great-great-grandsons were Lord Moyola, Prime Minister of Northern Ireland and the Londonderry MP Robin Chichester-Clark.

Parliament of the United Kingdom
Preceded by James Johnston Clark; Samuel Macurdy Greer	Member of Parliament for Londonderry; 1859 – 1874; With: Sir Frederick Heygate, 2nd Bt	Succeeded by Richard Smyth; Hugh Law
Honorary titles
Preceded by Acheson Lyle	Lord Lieutenant of County Londonderry; 1870–1877	Succeeded by Sir Henry Bruce, Bt
