= Belfast (UK Parliament constituency) =

UK Parliamentary constituency in Ireland, 1801–1885

- Former borough constituency for the House of Commons
- County: County Antrim
- Borough: Belfast

1801–1885
- Seats: 1 (1801–1832); 2 (1832–1885)
- Created from: Belfast (IHC)
- Replaced by: Belfast East; Belfast North; Belfast South; Belfast West

Belfast was an Irish borough constituency in the House of Commons of the United Kingdom of Great Britain and Ireland. Comprising the city of Belfast, it elected one Member of Parliament (MP) from 1801 to 1832, and then two MPs from 1832 until the constituency was divided by the Redistribution of Seats Act 1885 before the 1885 general election.

== Representation ==
Prior to 1801, the parliamentary borough of was a two-seat constituency in the Irish House of Commons. Under the Acts of Union 1800, the Kingdom of Ireland was joined with the Kingdom of Great Britain to form the United Kingdom of Great Britain and Ireland. Belfast was represented from 1801 in the United Kingdom House of Commons by one MP. Its MP in 1801 to the First Parliament of the United Kingdom was chosen by lot.

Under the Representation of the People (Ireland) Act 1832, its representation was increased to two seats. Under the Redistribution of Seats Act 1885, the representation of the parliamentary borough was increased to four seats, and it was divided into four separate divisions.

== Boundaries and boundary changes ==
This constituency was the parliamentary borough of Belfast in County Antrim. A report into the boundaries was undertaken in December 1831. The report found that limits of the borough were not defined, but as the limits were not connected with the elective franchise, it drew a line as closely as possible around the town. In 1832 and 1868 the boundaries of that borough were extended.

=== 1832 boundaries ===
The boundaries were defined by the Parliamentary Boundaries (Ireland) Act 1832 as:

"From the Point on the South-east of the Town at which the Blackstaff River joins the River Lagan, up the Blackstaff River, to the Point at which the same is joined by a small Stream which washes the Wall of Mr Campbell's Cotton Works; thence up the said small Stream to the Point at which the same would be cut by a straight Line to be drawn from the Chimney of Mr Campbell's Cotton Works to an old Fort on the West of the Town, in a field belonging to Mr Elliott, near a Brickfield on the Left of the old Lodge Road; thence in a straight Line to the said old Fort; thence in a straight Line to the South-western Angle of the Graveyard which is to the West of the Infantry Barracks; thence along the Southern Wall of the said Graveyard to the Point at which the same makes an Angle; thence in a straight Line to the South-western Angle of the Enclosure of the Infantry Barracks; thence along the Western Enclosure Wall of the Infantry Barracks to the Northern Extremity thereof; thence along a Ditch which is the Boundary of the Ordnance Land to the Point at which the same reaches the South-western Angle of the Enclosure of the Artillery Barracks; thence along the Western Enclosure Wall of the Artillery Barracks; and along a Ditch in continuation of the Direction thereof, to the Point at which such Ditch meets a Road which leads from the Ballynure Road into the old Carrickfergus Road; thence along the Road so leading into the old Carrickfergus Road to the Point at which the same joins the old Carrickfergus Road; thence, Northward, along the old Carrickfergus Road to the Point at which the same meets the Mile Water; thence down the Mile Water to the Point at which the same joins the River Lagan; thence along the River Lagan to the Point first described; also beyond the Lagan, the Townland of Ballymacarrett."

=== 1868 boundaries ===
The Representation of the People (Ireland) Act 1868, provided that all that part of the borough situate beyond the limits of the parliamentary borough as defined in 1832, but within the municipal limits, should form part of the borough for all purposes connected with the election of a member or members to serve in parliament for the borough. The Belfast Borough Extension Act 1853 had defined the boundaries of the borough as follows: The boundary is shown as 'Municipal Boundary' on the second edition of the Ordnance Survey maps of Ireland.

"From the Northern Lighthouse on the Eastern Twin Island [near East Twin Road], Southward, in a straight Line to the Centre of the Bridge over Conn's Water on the Hollywood Railway [Connswater Bridge, near the junction of Connsbank Road with the Sydenham Bypass], thence Southward along the Boundary of the Townland of Ballymacarret to the Point at which the same meets the Boundary of the Townland of Ballynafoy [near Hillsborough Drive], thence Southward and Westward along the said Boundary of Ballynafoy to the Point at which the same meets the River Lagan [at the southern end of the Annadale Embankment], thence Westward along the River Lagan to the Centre of the Weir adjoining the Canal [near the eastern end of Laganvale Manor], thence Northward along the Canal to the First Lock [near the eastern end of Prince Edward Park, across Lockview Road], thence North-westward along the Road at the West Side of the River Lagan to the Point at which the same is crossed by the Old Belfast Watercourse, thence South- ward and Westward along the said Watercourse to a Brick Wall belonging to the Water Commissioners, thence Southward along the Fence which divides Mr. Batt's from Mr. Ward's Property, thence Westward along the Fence which divides Mr. Ward’s Property from Mr. Gilmore's and Mr. Batt’s Property to the Old Lisburn Road [the Malone Road], thence Northward about Fifty Yards on the Old Lisburn Road to the Fence of Mr. McQuiston's Property, thence Westward along the said Fence which divides Mr. McQuiston's Property from Mr. Honey's and Mr. Owden's Property to the Point at which the same meets the Blackstaff River [near the Boucher Road], thence North-westward in a straight Line to the Point at which the Old White Rock Road [now the Whiterock Road] meets the Falls Road, thence Westward along the Old White Rock Road to the Point at which the same meets the Cross Road [now Brittons Parade] close to the Fort, thence Northward along the said Cross Road to the Point at which the same meets the Boundary of the Townland of Ballymurphy [near Davitts GAC], thence North-westward along the said Boundary to the North-east Point of the said Boundary [near Lyndhurst Meadows], thence Northward in a straight line to the Centre of the Fort immediately behind the House of Mr. Moses Staunton [now Glencairn Clinic], thence North- eastward in a straight Line to the Point at which the Boundary of Ballysillan Lower meets the Forth River [near Forthriver Way], thence North-east- ward along the said Boundary to the North-east Point of the said Boundary at which the same meets a Stream [near Etna Drive], thence Eastward and Northward along the said Stream to the Point at which the said Stream crosses the [Oldpark] Road at Old Park Mills [now Cliftonville Circus], thence Northward and Eastward along the [Westland] Road to the South End of the House of Mr. John Beatty [on Old Westland Road], thence Eastward in a straight Line to the Eastern Angle of the Boundary of the Townland of Old Park [on Hughenden Avenue], thence Eastward in a straight line to the Point at which Buttermilk Lane [now Skegoneill Avenue] meets the Antrim Road, thence Eastward along Buttermilk Lane to the Point at which the same meets the Carrickfergus Road [York Road/Shore Road], thence Eastward in a straight Line to the Point first described."

=== 1885 division ===
Under the Redistribution of Seats Act 1885, the parliamentary borough of Belfast was further expanded and defined as:

The present parliamentary borough of Belfast, and

in the parish of Holywood, County Down, the townlands of Ballymaghan, Ballymisert, Strandtown and Strandtown Town, Ballyhackamore and Ballyhackamore Town, and Ballycloghan, and
in the parish of Knockbreda, County Down, the townlands of Knock, Multyhogy, and Ballyrushboy, and
in the parish of Shankill, County Armagh, the townlands of Lower Malone, that part of Upper Malone bounded on the south by the centre of the road running northward and westward for about 80 chains from Shaw's Bridge, Ballymurphy, Ballymagarry, Ballygomartin, Ballysillan Lower, Legoniel and Legoniel Town, Old Park and Old Park Town, Skegoniell, that part of Ballyaghagan which adjoins the Antrim Road (namely the whole of the part east of the Antrim Road, and the part west of the Antrim Road which is within 22 chains of that road), Lowwood, Greencastle and Greencastle Town.

It was divided into four single-member divisions: Belfast East, Belfast North, Belfast South and Belfast West.

== Electoral system and electorate ==
The parliamentary representatives of the borough were elected using the bloc vote for two-member elections and first past the post for single-member ones.

Until 1832 the electorate were the members of Belfast Corporation. This had long been resented by reformers as it made the constituency a pocket borough of the Marquess of Donegall.

In 1784 a petition was sent to the Parliament of Ireland.

"Your petitioners in the most humble and respectful manner, take leave to represent to your Hon House,

That Belfast is a large and populous town, containing above 15,000 inhabitants, carrying on a very extensive foreign commerce, as well as inland trade, and paying annually upwards of £80,000 towards the public revenue.

That this numerous body of people not being represented in your Hon House, are, contrary to the fundamental principle of the constitution, governed by laws to which they give no assent; for although the borough of Belfast sends two Members to parliament, yet those members are returned (under the immediate direction of a noble peer) by five or six Burgesses, in the appointment of whom your Petitioners have no share, and therefore the members so returned cannot in any sense, be deemed the Representatives of your Petitioners."

In 1832 the electorate was considerably extended by the Representation of the People (Ireland) Act 1832. Boroughs in Ireland were given a uniform franchise for the first time. The vote was given to occupiers of land valued at least £10 and resident freemen by birth or servitude (descent from or apprenticeship to an existing freeman of the borough) or who were admitted before March 1831.

== Members of Parliament ==
| Election | 1st member | 1st party | 2nd member | 2nd party |
|---|---|---|---|---|
| 1801 | Sir (James) Edward May, Bt | Tory | | |
| 1802 | Sir (James) Edward May, Bt | Tory | | |
| 1806 | Sir (James) Edward May, Bt | Tory | | |
| 1807 | Sir (James) Edward May, Bt | Tory | | |
| 1812 | Sir (James) Edward May, Bt | Tory | | |
| 1814 by-election | Stephen Edward May | Tory | | |
| 1816 by-election | John Michel | Tory | | |
| 1818 | Arthur Chichester | Tory | | |
| 1820 | Earl of Belfast | Tory | | |
| 1826 | Earl of Belfast | Tory | | |
| 1830 | Sir Arthur Chichester, Bt | Whig | | |
| 1831 | Sir Arthur Chichester, Bt | Whig | | |
| 1832 | Lord Arthur Chichester | Tory | James Emerson Tennent | Whig |
| 1834 | Lord Arthur Chichester | Conservative | James Emerson Tennent | Whig |
| 1835 | John McCance | Whig | James Emerson Tennent | Conservative |
| 1835 by-election | George Dunbar | Conservative | James Emerson Tennent | Conservative |
| 1837 | James Gibson | Whig | George Chichester | Whig |
| 1838 by-election | George Dunbar | Conservative | James Emerson Tennent | Conservative |
| 1841 | William Gillilan Johnson | Conservative | James Emerson Tennent | Conservative |
| 1842 by-election | David Robert Ross | Whig | James Emerson Tennent | Conservative |
| 1845 by-election | David Robert Ross | Whig | Lord John Chichester | Conservative |
| 1847 | Robert James Tennent | Whig | Lord John Chichester | Peelite |
| 1852 | Richard Davison | Conservative | Sir Hugh Cairns | Conservative |
| 1859 | Richard Davison | Conservative | Sir Hugh Cairns | Conservative |
| 1860 by-election | Samuel Gibson Getty | Conservative | Sir Hugh Cairns | Conservative |
| 1865 | Samuel Gibson Getty | Conservative | Sir Hugh Cairns | Conservative |
| 1866 by-election | Samuel Gibson Getty | Conservative | Sir Charles Lanyon | Conservative |
| 1868 | Thomas McClure | Liberal | William Johnston | Conservative |
| 1874 | James Corry | Conservative | William Johnston | Conservative |
| 1878 by-election | James Corry | Conservative | William Ewart | Conservative |
| 1880 | James Corry | Conservative | William Ewart | Conservative |
| 1885 | constituency divided: see North, East, South and West divisions | | | |

Notes

- (1) Lord Arthur Chichester and James Emerson Tennent changed party allegiance in 1834 (from Liberal to Conservative).
- (2) Lord John Ludford Chichester changed party allegiance by 1847 (part of Peelite faction).

== Elections ==
After 1832, when registration of voters was introduced, a turnout figure is given for contested elections. In two-member elections (when the exact number of voters is unknown) this is calculated by dividing the number of votes by two. To the extent that voters did not use both their votes this will be an underestimate of turnout. If the electorate figure is unknown the last known electorate figure is used to provide an estimate of turnout.

Where a party had more than one candidate in one or both of a pair of successive elections change is calculated for each individual candidate, otherwise change is based on the party vote.

=== Elections in the 1800s ===
Co-option 1 January 1801: Belfast
| Party | Candidate | Votes | % | ±% |
|---|---|---|---|---|
| Tory | Edward May | Co-opted | N/A | N/A |
| Tory win (new seat) | | | | |

General election 12 July 1802: Belfast
| Party | Candidate | Votes | % | ±% |
|---|---|---|---|---|
| Tory | Edward May | Unopposed | N/A | N/A |
| Tory hold | | | | |

General election 17 November 1806: Belfast
| Party | Candidate | Votes | % | ±% |
|---|---|---|---|---|
| Tory | Edward May | Unopposed | N/A | N/A |
| Tory hold | | | | |

General election 15 May 1807: Belfast
| Party | Candidate | Votes | % | ±% |
|---|---|---|---|---|
| Tory | Edward May | Unopposed | N/A | N/A |
| Tory hold | | | | |

=== Elections in the 1810s ===
General election 23 October 1812: Belfast
| Party | Candidate | Votes | % | ±% |
|---|---|---|---|---|
| Tory | Sir Edward May | Unopposed | N/A | N/A |
| Tory hold | | | | |

- Death of May

By-election 16 September 1814: Belfast
| Party | Candidate | Votes | % | ±% |
|---|---|---|---|---|
| Tory | James May | Unopposed | N/A | N/A |
| Tory hold | | | | |

- Appointment of May as Collector of Customs in Belfast Port

By-election 3 May 1816: Belfast
| Party | Candidate | Votes | % | ±% |
|---|---|---|---|---|
| Tory | John Michel | Unopposed | N/A | N/A |
| Tory hold | | | | |

General election 8 July 1818: Belfast
| Party | Candidate | Votes | % | ±% |
|---|---|---|---|---|
| Tory | Arthur Chichester | Unopposed | N/A | N/A |
| Tory hold | | | | |

=== Elections in the 1820s ===
General election 16 March 1820: Belfast
| Party | Candidate | Votes | % | ±% |
|---|---|---|---|---|
| Tory | George Chichester | Unopposed | N/A | N/A |
| Tory hold | | | | |

General election 15 June 1826: Belfast
| Party | Candidate | Votes | % | ±% |
|---|---|---|---|---|
| Tory | George Chichester | Unopposed | N/A | N/A |
| Tory hold | | | | |

=== Elections in the 1830s ===
General election 6 August 1830: Belfast
| Party | Candidate | Votes | % |
|---|---|---|---|
| Whig | Arthur Chichester | Unopposed | |
| Registered electors | | 13 | |
| Whig gain from Tory | | | |

General election 20 May 1831: Belfast
| Party | Candidate | Votes | % |
|---|---|---|---|
| Whig | Arthur Chichester | Unopposed | |
| Registered electors | | 13 | |
| Whig hold | | | |

General election 21 December 1832: Belfast (2 seats)
| Party | Candidate | Votes | % |
|---|---|---|---|
| Tory | Arthur Chichester | 834 | 29.8 |
| Whig | James Emerson Tennent | 723 | 25.8 |
| Whig | Robert James Tennent | 625 | 22.3 |
| Radical | William Sharman Crawford | 616 | 22.0 |
| Turnout | | 1,420 | 85.6 |
| Registered electors | | 1,659 | |
| Majority | | 209 | 7.5 |
| Tory gain from Whig | | | |
| Majority | | 98 | 3.5 |
| Whig win (new seat) | | | |

J. Emerson Tennent ceased to support Lord Grey in 1834 (see Emerson Tennent's article in The Oxford Dictionary of National Biography).

General election 17 January 1835: Belfast (2 seats)
| Party | Candidate | Votes | % | ±% |
|---|---|---|---|---|
| Conservative | James Emerson Tennent | 773 | 35.0 | +9.2 |
| Whig | John McCance | 719 | 32.6 | +10.3 |
| Conservative | Arthur Chichester | 713 | 32.3 | +2.5 |
| Radical | John French | 3 | 0.1 | −21.9 |
| Turnout | | 1,407 | 65.8 | −19.8 |
| Registered electors | | 2,137 | | |
| Majority | | 770 | 34.9 | N/A |
| Conservative gain from Whig | | Swing | +2.0 | |
| Majority | | 6 | 0.3 | N/A |
| Whig gain from Conservative | | Swing | −11.0 | |

Note: Stooks Smith suggests there were 1,451 registered electors. Walker gives the electorate figure as above.

- Death of McCance

By-election, 27 August 1835: Belfast
| Party | Candidate | Votes | % | ±% |
|---|---|---|---|---|
| Conservative | George Dunbar | 162 | 66.4 | −0.9 |
| Whig | Robert James Tennent | 82 | 33.6 | +1.0 |
| Majority | | 80 | 32.8 | N/A |
| Turnout | | 244 | 9.9 | −55.9 |
| Registered electors | | 2,458 | | |
| Conservative gain from Whig | | Swing | −1.0 | |

Note: Stooks Smith suggests there were 1,508 registered electors. Walker gives the electorate figure as above. Stooks Smith also indicates that 'Mr Tennent resigned in consequence of a decision of the Assessors'.

General election 5 August 1837: Belfast (2 seats)
| Party | Candidate | Votes | % | ±% |
|---|---|---|---|---|
| Whig | James Gibson | 941 | 25.9 | +9.6 |
| Whig | George Chichester | 922 | 25.4 | +9.1 |
| Conservative | James Emerson Tennent | 901 | 24.8 | −10.2 |
| Conservative | George Dunbar | 869 | 23.9 | −8.4 |
| Majority | | 21 | 0.6 | N/A |
| Turnout | | 1,836 | 50.4 | −15.4 |
| Registered electors | | 3,641 | | |
| Whig gain from Conservative | | Swing | +9.5 | |
| Whig hold | | Swing | +9.2 | |

Stooks Smith suggests there were 1,926 registered electors. Walker gives the electorate figure as above.

- 8 March 1838: On petition Gibson and the Earl of Belfast were unseated and Emerson Tennent and Dunbar declared elected

=== Elections in the 1840s ===
General election 10 July 1841: Belfast (2 seats)
| Party | Candidate | Votes | % | ±% |
|---|---|---|---|---|
| Conservative | James Emerson Tennent | 927 | 26.8 | +2.0 |
| Conservative | William Gillilan Johnson | 913 | 26.4 | +2.5 |
| Whig | George Chichester | 821 | 23.8 | −1.6 |
| Whig | David Robert Ross | 792 | 22.9 | −3.0 |
| Majority | | 92 | 2.6 | N/A |
| Turnout | | 1,748 | 29.6 | −20.8 |
| Registered electors | | 5,907 | | |
| Conservative gain from Whig | | Swing | +2.2 | |
| Conservative gain from Whig | | Swing | +2.4 | |

Note: 1,740 electors voted. Stooks Smith suggests there were 1,937 registered electors. Walker gives the electorate figure as above.

- On petition Emerson Tennent and Johnson unseated and new writ issued

By-election, 19 August 1842: Belfast (2 seats)
| Party | Candidate | Votes | % | ±% |
|---|---|---|---|---|
| Whig | David Robert Ross | 886 | 39.5 | −7.2 |
| Conservative | James Emerson Tennent | 859 | 38.3 | +11.5 |
| Conservative | Hamilton Francis Chichester | 500 | 22.3 | −4.1 |
| Turnout | | 1,123 (est) | 26.5 (est) | −3.1 |
| Registered electors | | 4,234 | | |
| Majority | | 27 | 1.2 | N/A |
| Whig gain from Conservative | | Swing | −7.3 | |
| Majority | | 359 | 16.0 | +13.4 |
| Conservative hold | | Swing | +7.6 | |

Note: Stooks Smith comments that 'a compromise was entered into by which one of each party was to be returned'.

- Resignation of Emerson Tennent

By-election, 20 August 1845: Belfast
| Party | Candidate | Votes | % | ±% |
|---|---|---|---|---|
| Conservative | John Chichester | Unopposed | | |
| Conservative hold | | | | |

General election 9 August 1847: Belfast (2 seats)
| Party | Candidate | Votes | % | ±% |
|---|---|---|---|---|
| Whig | Robert James Tennent | 929 | 39.3 | −7.4 |
| Peelite | John Chichester | 747 | 31.6 | N/A |
| Conservative | George Suffern | 689 | 29.1 | −24.1 |
| Turnout | | 1,183 (est) | 12.2 (est) | −17.4 |
| Registered electors | | 9,672 | | |
| Majority | | 182 | 7.7 | N/A |
| Whig gain from Conservative | | Swing | +2.3 | |
| Majority | | 58 | 2.5 | N/A |
| Peelite gain from Conservative | | Swing | N/A | |

=== Elections in the 1850s ===
General election 13 July 1852: Belfast (2 seats)
| Party | Candidate | Votes | % | ±% |
|---|---|---|---|---|
| Conservative | Richard Davison | 1,259 | 37.5 | N/A |
| Conservative | Hugh Cairns | 1,193 | 35.5 | N/A |
| Whig | Robert James Tennent | 904 | 26.9 | −12.4 |
| Majority | | 289 | 8.6 | N/A |
| Turnout | | 2,130 (est.) | 79.0 (est.) | +66.8 |
| Registered electors | | 2,697 | | |
| Conservative gain from Peelite | | Swing | N/A | |
| Conservative gain from Whig | | Swing | N/A | |

General election 3 April 1857: Belfast (2 seats)
| Party | Candidate | Votes | % | ±% |
|---|---|---|---|---|
| Conservative | Hugh Cairns | 1,479 | 28.5 | −7.0 |
| Conservative | Richard Davison | 1,410 | 27.2 | −10.3 |
| Whig | John Robinson McClean | 995 | 19.2 | N/A |
| Whig | John Francis Ferguson | 733 | 14.1 | N/A |
| Whig | Thomas McClure | 566 | 10.9 | N/A |
| Majority | | 415 | 8.0 | −0.6 |
| Turnout | | 2,592 (est.) | 73.7 | −5.3 |
| Registered electors | | 3,518 | | |
| Conservative hold | | Swing | N/A | |
| Conservative hold | | Swing | N/A | |

- Appointment of Cairns as Solicitor-General

By-election, 5 March 1858: Belfast
| Party | Candidate | Votes | % | ±% |
|---|---|---|---|---|
| Conservative | Hugh Cairns | Unopposed | | |
| Conservative hold | | | | |

General election 2 May 1859: Belfast (2 seats)
| Party | Candidate | Votes | % | ±% |
|---|---|---|---|---|
| Conservative | Hugh Cairns | Unopposed | | |
| Conservative | Richard Davison | Unopposed | | |
| Registered electors | | 3,303 | | |
| Conservative hold | | | | |
| Conservative hold | | | | |

=== Elections in the 1860s ===
- Resignation of Davison

By-election 15 June 1860: Belfast
| Party | Candidate | Votes | % | ±% |
|---|---|---|---|---|
| Conservative | Samuel Gibson Getty | Unopposed | | |
| Conservative hold | | | | |

General election 15 July 1865: Belfast (2 seats)
| Party | Candidate | Votes | % | ±% |
|---|---|---|---|---|
| Conservative | Hugh Cairns | 1,822 | 40.1 | N/A |
| Conservative | Samuel Gibson Getty | 1,728 | 38.1 | N/A |
| Liberal | John Hay | 991 | 21.8 | New |
| Majority | | 737 | 16.3 | N/A |
| Turnout | | 2,766 (est.) | 81.0 (est.) | N/A |
| Registered electors | | 3,415 | | |
| Conservative hold | | Swing | N/A | |
| Conservative hold | | Swing | N/A | |

- Appointment of Cairns as Attorney-General

By-election 13 July 1866: Belfast
| Party | Candidate | Votes | % | ±% |
|---|---|---|---|---|
| Conservative | Hugh Cairns | Unopposed | | |
| Registered electors | | 3,615 | | |
| Conservative hold | | | | |

- Appointment of Cairns as Lord Justice of Appeal in Chancery (of England and Wales)

By-election 2 November 1866: Belfast
| Party | Candidate | Votes | % | ±% |
|---|---|---|---|---|
| Conservative | Charles Lanyon | 1,263 | 99.0 | N/A |
| Conservative | William McMeechan | 13 | 1.0 | N/A |
| Majority | | 1,250 | 98.0 | N/A |
| Turnout | | 1,276 | 35.3 | −45.7 |
| Registered electors | | 3,615 | | |
| Conservative hold | | Swing | N/A | |

General election 21 November 1868: Belfast (2 seats)
| Party | Candidate | Votes | % | ±% |
|---|---|---|---|---|
| Conservative | William Johnston | 5,975 | 39.1 | −1.0 |
| Liberal | Thomas McClure | 4,202 | 27.5 | −10.7 |
| Conservative | Charles Lanyon | 3,540 | 23.1 | +1.3 |
| Conservative | John Mulholland | 1,580 | 10.3 | N/A |
| Turnout | | 9,750 (est.) | 80.1 (est.) | −0.9 |
| Registered electors | | 12,168 | | |
| Majority | | 1,773 | 11.6 | −4.7 |
| Conservative hold | | Swing | +2.2 | |
| Majority | | 662 | 4.4 | N/A |
| Liberal gain from Conservative | | Swing | −3.3 | |

=== Elections in the 1870s ===
General election 5 February 1874: Belfast (2 seats)
| Party | Candidate | Votes | % | ±% |
|---|---|---|---|---|
| Conservative | James Corry | 8,412 | 39.7 | +16.6 |
| Conservative | William Johnston | 8,176 | 38.6 | −0.5 |
| Liberal | Thomas McClure | 4,096 | 19.3 | −8.2 |
| Ind. Conservative | John Rea | 506 | 2.4 | New |
| Majority | | 4,080 | 19.3 | +7.7 |
| Turnout | | 12,896 (est.) | 80.7 (est.) | +0.6 |
| Registered electors | | 15,979 | | |
| Conservative hold | | Swing | +10.4 | |
| Conservative gain from Liberal | | Swing | +1.8 | |

- Appointment of Johnston as Inspector of Fisheries

By-election 2 April 1878: Belfast
| Party | Candidate | Votes | % | ±% |
|---|---|---|---|---|
| Conservative | William Ewart | 8,241 | 62.7 | −15.6 |
| Ind. Conservative | Robert Seeds | 4,895 | 37.3 | +34.9 |
| Majority | | 3,346 | 25.4 | +6.1 |
| Turnout | | 13,136 | 65.7 | −15.0 |
| Registered electors | | 20,005 | | |
| Conservative hold | | Swing | N/A | |

=== Elections in the 1880s ===
General election 1 April 1880: Belfast (2 seats)
| Party | Candidate | Votes | % | ±% |
|---|---|---|---|---|
| Conservative | William Ewart | 8,132 | 30.1 | −8.6 |
| Conservative | James Corry | 7,683 | 28.4 | −11.2 |
| Ind. Conservative | Robert Seeds | 6,119 | 22.6 | +20.2 |
| Liberal | John Shaw Brown | 5,122 | 18.9 | −0.4 |
| Majority | | 2,561 | 5.8 | −13.5 |
| Turnout | | 19,149 (est.) | 90.4 (est.) | +9.7 |
| Registered electors | | 21,188 | | |
| Conservative hold | | Swing | −9.9 | |
| Conservative hold | | Swing | −11.3 | |

- Constituency divided in the 1885 redistribution

=== See also ===
- List of Irish constituencies
- List of UK Parliament Constituencies in Ireland and Northern Ireland
