= Thomas McClure =

British politician (1806–1893)

Thomas McClure, 1st Baronet of Belmont Sir DL
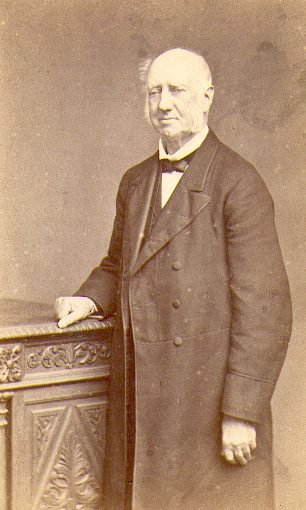
- Sir Thomas McClure, Bt

MP for Belfast
- In office 1868–1874
- Preceded by: Charles Lanyon; Samuel Gibson Getty
- Succeeded by: William Johnston; James Porter Corry

High Sheriff of Down
- In office 1864–1868

MP for County Londonderry
- In office 1878–1885
- Preceded by: Richard Smyth; Hugh Law
- Succeeded by: Constituency abolished

Baronet of Belmont
- In office 1874–1893
- Preceded by: New creation
- Succeeded by: Extinct

Personal details
- Born: Thomas McClure; 4 March 1806
- Died: 21 January 1893 (aged 86)
- Spouse: Ellison Thorburn Macfie (m. 1877–1893)

Sir Thomas McClure, 1st Baronet, DL (4 March 1806 – 21 January 1893) was an MP for Belfast from 1868 to 1874. MP for Londonderry County 1878–1885.

He was appointed High Sheriff of Down for 1864 and later served as vice-lieutenant of the county.

McClure was created a baronet, of Belmont, County Down, on 20 March 1874. This title became extinct on his death. Belmont, his home – bought from Lord Ranfurley – stood on the site of Campbell College.

McClure married at Dreghorn Castle, Colinton, Scotland on the 18 October 1877. He married Ellison Thorburn Macfie (1842–1906) daughter of Robert Andrew Macfie of Dreghorn, a wealthy sugar refiner.

Parliament of the United Kingdom
Preceded by Charles Lanyon; Samuel Gibson Getty	Member of Parliament for Belfast; 1868 – 1874; With: William Johnston	Succeeded by William Johnston; James Corry
Preceded by Richard Smyth; Hugh Law	Member of Parliament for County Londonderry; 1878 – 1885; With: Hugh Law 1878–1881; Andrew Marshall Porter 1881–1884; Samuel Walker 1884–1885	Constituency abolished
Baronetage of the United Kingdom
New creation	Baronet (of Belmont); 1874–1893	Extinct
