= Charles Johnston (theosophist) =

Irish writer

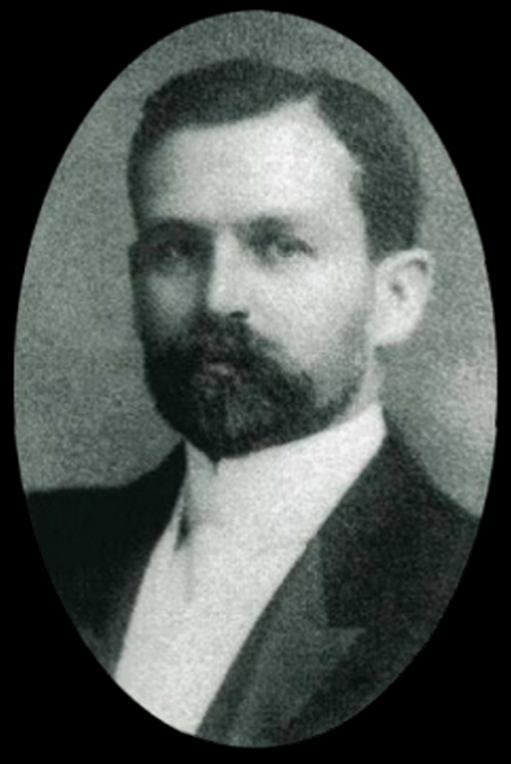
Charles Johnston

Charles Johnston (17 February 1867 – 16 October 1931) was an Irish writer, journalist, theosophist, naturalist, and Sanskrit scholar. Johnston joined the Indian Civil Service in 1888 but left India after two years due to malaria and settled in the United States in 1896. He wrote numerous books on Indian philosophy, translating works from Sanskrit as well as on Theosophy. He was married to the niece of Madame Blavatsky and was involved in the development of the Theosophical Society in the United States.

== Biography ==
He was born on 17 February 1867 in the small village of Ballykilbeg (in Downpatrick), County Down, Northern Ireland. His father, William Johnston (1829–1902), was an Irish politician, a member of parliament from South Belfast, an evangelical member of the Orange Order and a women's suffragist. His maternal grandfather was Sir John Hay, 5th baronet of Haystoun.

Charles Johnston studied at Derby, England and Dublin University becoming interested in Oriental Studies, and learned Sanskrit, Russian and German. Among his classmates were William Butler Yeats and George William Russell, with whom he shared an interest in the occult.

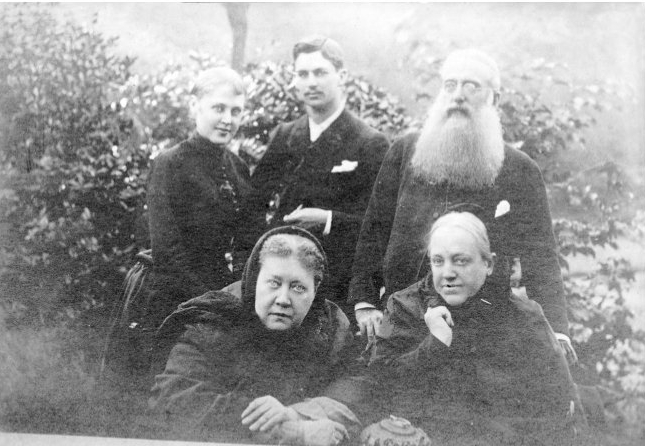
Standing left to right: Vera Vladimirovna Johnston, Charles Johnston, Colonel H.S. Olcott. Seated: H.P. Blavatsky and her sister Vera Petrovna de Jelihovsky

Later, Johnston worked as a journalist. In 1884, he read Alfred Percy Sinnett's work The Occult World and founded, together with Yeats and Russell on 16 June 1885, the Hermetic Society in Dublin. After 1885 he also joined the Theosophical Society, and co-founded in April/June 1886 the Theosophical Lodge in Dublin. He was responsible for introducing Yeats to Madame Blavatsky in spring 1887. On 14 October 1888 he married Vera Vladimirovna de Zhelihovsky (1864–1923), the niece of Helena Blavatsky. He also entered the Indian Civil Service the same year, and served for two years in the (British) Bengal Civil Service before contracting malaria. He was an assistant magistrate in Murshidabad for some time. He resigned and was treated in Austria. Johnston translated several works from Sanskrit and Russian. As an author, he devoted himself primarily to philosophical and theosophical topics. When the Theosophical Society split in 1895, he followed the direction of William Quan Judge and was a member of the Theosophical Society in America (TGinA). After Judge's death the following year, Katherine Tingley came to head the organization. Then in 1898, Johnston, who had initially supported Tingley, seceded from Tingley's organization along with some 200 other members led by Ernest Temple Hargrove to form the Theosophical Society in America (Hargrove) Branch. In the US, Johnston continued to write commentaries on matters relating to India.

Johnston was president of the Irish Literary Society.

Johnston was also a member of the Linnean Society of New York and was a keen observer of birds especially in the New York region. He influenced several young ornithologists including Ludlow Griscom (whose father was involved in the Theosophical movement) and Joseph Hickey, both of the Bronx County Bird Club.

== Bibliography ==
=== Collected writings ===
- Johnston, Charles, The Mukhya Upanishads: Books of Hidden Wisdom
- Johnston, Charles, The Tao Teh King: Lao Tse's Book of the Way and of Righteousness
- Johnston, Charles, The Vedanta Philosophy of Sankaracharya
- Johnston, Charles (1908), The Bhagavad Gita: The Songs of the Master, ISBN 978-0-524-09711-3
- Johnston, Charles, Hidden Wisdom: The Collected Writings of Charles Johnston, Vol. I]
- Johnston, Charles, Hidden Wisdom: The Collected Writings of Charles Johnston, Vol. II
- Johnston, Charles, Hidden Wisdom: The Collected Writings of Charles Johnston, Vol. III
- Johnston, Charles, Hidden Wisdom: The Collected Writings of Charles Johnston, Vol. IV

=== Theosophical and Indological writings ===
- Useful Sanskrit Nouns and Verb in English Letters. London: Luzac, 1892.
- The Awakening to the Self. Translation of Sankarâchârya. New York: Johnston, 1897.
- From the Upanishads. Portland, ME: Thomas Mosher, 1899.
- The Memory of Past Births. New York: Theosophical Society Publishing Co., 1899.
- Karma: Works and Wisdom. New York : Metaphysical Pub. Co., 1900. Available at hathtrust.
- The Song of Life. Flushing, NY: Charles Johnston, 1901. A translation of the "dialogue of Janaka and the sage", preceded by "a modern paraphrase of the Teachings".
- The Bhagavad-gîta: "The Songs of the Master". Flushing, N.Y.: C. Johnston, 1908.
- Parables of the Kingdom. Flushing, NY: Charles Johnston, 1909.
- The system of the Vedânta according to Bâdarâyaṇa's Brahma-sûtras and Cankara's commentary thereon set forth as a compendium of the dogmatics of brahmanism from the standpoint of Çankara. Chicago, The Open Court Publishing Company, 1912.
- Yoga Sutras of Patanjali. New York: Quarterly Book Department, 1912.
- Eastern and Western Psychology: a Theosophical Need. New York: Theosophical Society, 1917.
- The Great Upanishads, Isha, Kena, Katha, Prashna, Upanishads Volume 1. New York: Quarterly Book Department, 1927.
- The Crest-Jewel of Wisdom by Śankarâchârya. San Diego: Theosophical University Press, 1946. Translated by Charles Johnston. Available at Theosophical University Press Online.

=== Popular books ===
- Kela Bai: An Anglo-Indian Idyll. New York: Doubleday & McClure, 1900. Novel.
- Ireland: Historic and Picturesque. Philadelphia: Henry T. Coates & Co., 1902. Illustrated travelogue.
- Ireland's Story. Boston: Houghton, Mifflin, 1905, 1923. Written with Carita Spencer. Illustrated history of Ireland.
- Why the World Laughs. New York: Harper & Bros, 1912. A book of humorous stories from many countries.
