= Samuel Gibson Getty =

British politician (c.1817–1877)

Samuel Gibson Getty (c. 1817 – 15 December 1877) was a Conservative Party politician. He sat in the House of Commons of the United Kingdom from 1860 to 1868 as one of the two Members of Parliament (MPs) for Belfast.

Parliament of the United Kingdom
Preceded by Richard Davison; Hugh Cairns	Member of Parliament for Belfast; 1860 – 1868; With: Hugh Cairns to 1868; Charles Lanyon 1866–68	Succeeded by William Johnston; Thomas McClure
