= Thomas Macknight =

Anglo-Irish newspaper editor, biographer and publisher

Thomas Macknight (15 February 1829 – 19 November 1899) was an English editor of Ireland's leading Liberal newspaper, the Northern Whig in Belfast, a biographer and publisher. As the author of Ulster As It Is (1896) he credited with promoting the so-called two nations theory which proposes that Ulster Protestants are a national minority in Ireland, politically and culturally distinct from the island's Catholic majority.

== Life ==
Born in Gainford in County Durham, the son of Thomas Macknight, and his wife, Elizabeth, Macknight was privately educated at Dr Bowman's school in Gainford. He enrolled in the Medical Faculty at King's College, London in 1849 where he met and was influenced by Frederick Denison Maurice. Macknight left the college in 1851 without taking his degree, having discovered an interest in journalism, and began his career by writing leaders for a number of London daily papers. He married the actress Sarah Thorne sometime between 1856 and 1859. They had two children during their three years together, Edmund (b. 1860) and Elizabeth (b. 1862), but due to incompatibility the couple separated soon after the birth of their daughter. In January 1866 Macknight succeeded Frank Harrison Hill as editor of The Northern Whig in Belfast, where he remained for thirty-three years. Macknight was a Liberal and supported Gladstone's Irish land legislation; he admired Gladstone (who had helped him to publish his biography of Edmund Burke and there are several letters from him to Gladstone discussing Belfast politics in the Gladstone Papers at the British Library. MacKnight, however, opposed Gladstone's proposals for Home Rule, believing that Ireland's problems could only be resolved through legislation from Westminster.

A Unionist, Thomas Macknight's publications included A Literary and Political Biography of the Right Honorable Benjamin Disraeli, MP Richard Bentley, London (1854); The History of the Life and Times of Edmund Burke in three volumes, Chapman and Hall, London (1856 to 1860); Life of Henry St. John, Viscount Bolingbroke (1863), and Ulster As It Is or Thirty Years Experience as an Irish Editor (1896).

Following his death on 19 November 1899 Macknight was buried in Belfast City Cemetery.
