= George Chichester, 3rd Marquess of Donegall =

British politician

The Most Honourable The Marquess of Donegall KP GCH PC
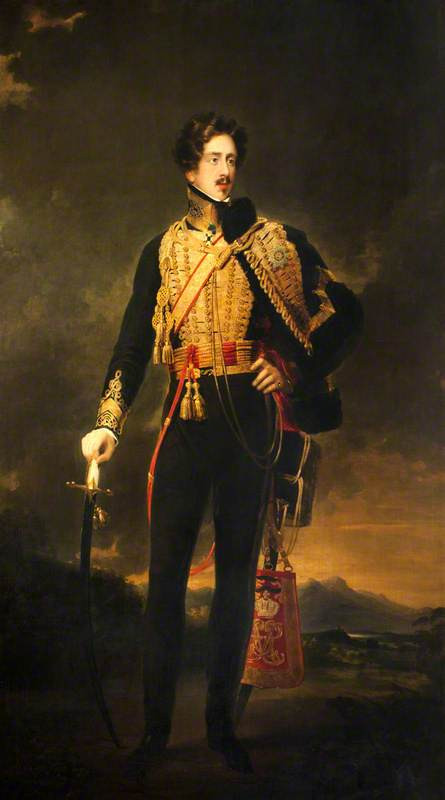

Captain of the Yeomen of the Guard
- In office 11 February 1848 – 21 February 1852
- Monarch: Victoria
- Prime Minister: Lord John Russell
- Preceded by: The Viscount Falkland
- Succeeded by: The Lord de Ros

Member of the House of Lords (Note: As Baron Ennishowen and Carrickfergus.)
- Lord Temporal
- In office 11 August 1841 – 20 October 1883
- Preceded by: Peerage created
- Succeeded by: The 4th Marquess of Donegall (Note: As Baron Fisherwick.)

Personal details
- Born: George Hamilton Chichester; 10 February 1797 Great Cumberland Place, London
- Died: 20 October 1883 (aged 86) Brighton, Sussex
- Party: Tory; Whig
- Spouses: Harriet Butler (m. 1822; died 1860) Harriet Graham (m. 1862)
- Children: 3
- Parents: George Chichester, 2nd Marquess of Donegall; Anna May
- Education: Christ Church, Oxford
- Other titles: 7th Earl of Donegall; 8th Viscount Chichester; 8th Baron Chichester; 3rd Baron Fisherwick; 1st Baron Ennishowen and Carrickfergus

George Hamilton Chichester, 3rd Marquess of Donegall (10 February 1797 – 20 October 1883), styled Viscount Chichester until 1799 and Earl of Belfast between 1799 and 1844, was an Anglo-Irish landowner, courtier and politician. He served as Vice-Chamberlain of the Household from 1830 to 1834, as well as from 1838 to 1841, and as Captain of the Yeomen of the Guard between 1848 and 1852. Ennobled in his own right in 1841, he was also Lord Lieutenant of Antrim from 1841 to 1883 and was made a Knight of St Patrick in 1857.

== Background and education ==
Lord Donegall was born at Great Cumberland Place, London, the eldest son of Viscount Chichester (who became the 2nd Marquess of Donegall in 1799) by his wife Anna May, daughter of Sir Edward May, 2nd Baronet. He was educated at Eton and Christ Church, Oxford, before serving for a time as a captain with the 11th Hussars. He was known by the courtesy title Viscount Chichester from birth until 1799 and as Earl of Belfast from 1799 to 1844.

== Political career ==
In 1818, Lord Belfast (as he was from 1799 until 1844) was elected to the House of Commons as Member of Parliament (MP) for Carrickfergus, and two years later became representative for Belfast. In July 1830 he was sworn of the Privy Council and appointed Vice-Chamberlain of the Household in the Duke of Wellington's Tory administration. In August he was returned to Parliament for Antrim. He continued as Vice-Chamberlain after Lord Grey formed his Whig government in November 1830. In 1831 he was made a Knight Grand Cross of the Royal Guelphic Order. He remained as Vice-Chamberlain until 1834, the last months under the premiership of Lord Melbourne. In 1837 he was once again returned to Parliament for Belfast. He did not initially serve in Melbourne's second administration, but in 1838 he once again became Vice-Chamberlain of the Household. He resigned when the government fell in 1841, and during the same year he unsuccessfully contested Belfast as a Liberal candidate. He was instead raised to the Peerage of the United Kingdom in his own right as Baron Ennishowen and Carrickfergus, of Ennishowen in the County of Donegal and of Carrickfergus in the County of Antrim. He sat in the House of Lords at Westminster for three years under this title before succeeding his father in the marquessate in 1844.

Lord Donegall did not serve initially in Lord John Russell's first administration, but in 1848 he returned to the government as Captain of the Yeomen of the Guard. He resigned along with the rest of the Whig government in early 1852. Apart from his political career he was also Lord Lieutenant of Antrim from 1841 to 1883. In 1857 he was made a Knight of the Order of St Patrick. At the time of his death in 1883 he was the senior member of the Privy Council.

== Family ==
Lord Donegall married Lady Harriet Anne Butler (d. 1860), daughter of the 1st Earl of Glengall, in 1822. They had three children:

- Lady Harriet Augusta Anna Seymourina Chichester (d. 14 April 1898); married the 8th Earl of Shaftesbury.
- George Augustus Chichester, Viscount Chichester (26 May 1826 – 18 June 1827)
- Frederick Richard Chichester, Earl of Belfast (25 November 1827 – 11 February 1853); died in Naples, unmarried.

After his first wife's death in September 1860, he married as his second wife Harriett Graham (d. 1884), daughter of Sir Bellingham Reginald Graham, 7th Baronet, and widow of Sir Frederick Ashworth, in 1862. There were no children from this marriage. Lord Donegall died in Brighton, Sussex, in October 1883, aged 86, and was buried in Belfast.

As both his sons had predeceased him, the larger part of the Donegall estates was inherited by his only daughter, Harriet Ashley-Cooper, Lady Ashley (later Countess of Shaftesbury and previously Lady Harriet Augusta Anna Seymourina Chichester), wife of the 8th Earl of Shaftesbury.

He owned 23,000 acres, mostly in Donegal and Antrim.

The Ennishowen and Carrickfergus barony died with him, while he was succeeded in his other peerages by his younger brother, Lord Edward Chichester. The Marchioness of Donegall died in March 1884.

== Arms ==
Coat of arms of George Chichester, 3rd Marquess of Donegall
Coronet That of a marquess. Crest A stork, proper, wings expanded, holding in its beak an eel, argent, head or. Escutcheon Quarterly: 1st and 4th, chequy, or and gule, a chief vair (Chichester); 2nd and 3rd, azure fretty argent (Etchingham). Supporters Two wolves gules, ducally gorged and chained or. Motto Invitum sequitur honor (Honour follows, though unsought for). Orders The Most Illustrious Order of St. Patrick - Knight (KP).

== Notes ==
Parliament of the United Kingdom
Preceded by Arthur Chichester	Member of Parliament for Carrickfergus; 1818–1820	Succeeded by Sir Arthur Chichester, Bt
Preceded by Arthur Chichester	Member of Parliament for Belfast; 1820–1830	Succeeded by Sir Arthur Chichester, Bt
Preceded by Edmond Alexander McNaghten; Hon. John O'Neill	Member of Parliament for Antrim; 1830–1837; With: Hon. John O'Neill	Succeeded by John Irving; Hon. John O'Neill
Preceded by James Emerson Tennent; George Dunbar	Member of Parliament for Belfast; 1837–1838; With: James Gibson	Succeeded by James Emerson Tennent; George Dunbar
Political offices
Preceded by Sir Samuel Hulse	Vice-Chamberlain of the Household; 1830–1834	Succeeded by Viscount Castlereagh
Preceded by Lord Charles FitzRoy	Vice-Chamberlain of the Household; 1838–1841	Succeeded by Lord Ernest Bruce
Preceded by The Viscount Falkland	Captain of the Yeomen of the Guard; 1848–1852	Succeeded by The Lord de Ros
Honorary titles
Preceded by The Earl O'Neill	Lord Lieutenant of Antrim; 1841–1883	Succeeded by The Lord Waveney
Preceded by The Viscount Stratford de Redcliffe	Senior Privy Counsellor; 1880–1883	Succeeded by The Lord Ebury
Peerage of Ireland
Preceded by George Chichester	Marquess of Donegall; 1844–1883	Succeeded by Edward Chichester
Preceded by George Chichester	Earl of Donegall; 1844–1883	Succeeded by Edward Chichester
Preceded by George Chichester	Viscount Chichester; 1844–1883	Succeeded by Edward Chichester
Preceded by George Chichester	Baron Chichester; 2nd creation 1844–1883	Succeeded by Edward Chichester
Peerage of Great Britain
Preceded by George Chichester	Baron Fisherwick; 1844–1883	Succeeded by Edward Chichester
Peerage of the United Kingdom
New creation	Baron Ennishowen and Carrickfergus; 1841–1883; Member of the House of Lords (1841–1883)	Extinct
