= Sir Arthur Chichester, 1st Baronet =

Escutcheon of the Chichester baronets of Green Castle

Sir Arthur Chichester, 1st Baronet (c. 1769–1847) was an Irish politician who represented Carrickfergus and Belfast in the Parliament of the United Kingdom, with the patronage of the Marquess of Donegall. In the years after 1816 he became a convert to the cause of Catholic relief.

== Life ==
He was the son of the Rev. William Chichester LL.D. of Broughshane, rector of Clonmany from 1768 to 1791, and his wife Mary Anne Harvey, daughter of George Harvey of Malin Hall. The Rev. Edward Chichester, author and father of William O'Neill, 1st Baron O'Neill, was his younger half-brother. They were descendants of John Chichester, second son of Edward Chichester, 1st Viscount Chichester, whose eldest son was Arthur Chichester, 1st Earl of Donegall.

Arthur Chichester matriculated at Wadham College, Oxford in 1791, aged 22, graduating B.A. in 1795. Having entered Lincoln's Inn in 1791, he entered King's Inns in 1798, and was called to the Irish bar in 1799.

After the Union in 1801, the Carrickfergus constituency was not clearly controlled by any patron, though Lord Spencer Chichester, brother of George Chichester, 2nd Marquess of Donegall had sat for it as a Tory from 1803 to 1807. In 1812 Arthur Chichester defeated the Whig James Craig, with the Donegall interest that now was hostile to ministers. He topped the poll of four candidates in the one-member constituency, in a close race with Ezekiel Davys Wilson.

In 1818, Arthur Chichester made way at Carrickfergus for the Marquess's son the Earl of Belfast, being returned instead at Belfast, where the Marquess also had interest. Now more clearly a supporter of the Liverpool administration, while moving to a liberal view on reform of Catholic disabilities, Chichester lobbied for advancement for Edward Chichester, and asked for himself a baronetcy, granted in the coronation honours in 1821. On 13 September 1821 he was created the 1st Baronet of Greencastle, County Donegal.

The effect of the 1820 general election was that Chichester and the Earl of Belfast swapped the Carrickfergus and Belfast seats, with the Marquess of Downshire content that the "gentlemanlike" Chichester, interested in local questions, should return to Carrickfergus. Over a decade his views on the Catholic question hardened once more, as he became classified as an "Orangeman". At the 1830 general election he ran into trouble at Carrickfergus, opposed by Lord George Hill, brother of the Marquess of Downshire, and dropped out alleging bribery by Hill. He was brought in for Belfast on the Donegall interest, to 1832. He stood in Carrickfergus once more in 1832, as a reform Liberal, while at Belfast Lord Arthur Chichester took his place in the Donegall interest. His views proving unpopular, he was kept out by the Tory Conway Richard Dobbs in a close contest. He sought further patronage, but did not stand again.

Sir Arthur Chichester died unmarried on 25 May 1847, with the baronetcy becoming extinct.

== Notes ==
Baronetage of the United Kingdom
Preceded by Scott baronets	Chichester baronets of Greencastle; 13 September 1821	Succeeded by King baronets
