= James Gibson (Irish politician) =

Irish politician

James Gibson was an Irish politician.

Gibson was born in County Antrim and educated at Trinity College Dublin. He was admitted to the Irish Bar in 1828 and rose to become a QC, and latterly County Court Judge of Donegal. He was elected MP for Belfast in 1837. He was one of the Trustees of Magee College, Derry. He died on 5 February 1880.
