= Dundarave =

Dundarave may refer to:

- Dundarave Castle, near Inveraray, Scotland
- Dundarave House, a country house in Northern Ireland
- Dundarave (West Vancouver) a neighbourhood in West Vancouver, British Columbia, Canada
