= Edmond Macnaghten =

Edmond Macnaghten or Edmund MacNaghten may refer to:

- Edmond Alexander MacNaghten (1762–1832), Irish Tory politician from County Antrim, MP from 1797 to 1832
- His nephew Sir Edmund Workman-Macnaghten, 2nd Baronet (1790–1876), Irish baronet and Conservative Party politician, MP for Antrim from 1847 to 1852
