= Patrick Macnaghten =

British baronet

Sir Patrick Macnaghten, Baronet

Sir Patrick Alexander Macnaghten, 11th Baronet, DL (24 January 1927 – 22 August 2007) was a British baronet and Chief of the Clan Macnaghten.

Educated at Eton College and Trinity College, Cambridge, he worked as an engineer and manager with Cadbury's Chocolate. He succeeded to the Baronetcy and as Chief of the Name and Arms of the Clan Macnaghten in 1972. In his retirement he lived at the estate of his ancestral home, Dundarave Castle, which he ran until 2005. He was a Deputy Lieutenant and Vice President of the Northern Ireland Ploughing Association.

Macnaghten was a member of the Fisheries Conservancy Board.

He married Marianne Schaefer, Lady Macnaghten, on 10 September 1955 and had three children:

- Sir Malcolm Macnaghten, 12th Baronet (b. 21 September 1956), the 12th baronet.
- Edward Alexander (b. 24 July 1958)
- David Charles (b. 22 September 1962)

Sir Patrick Macnaghten died on 22 August 2007. The funeral was on Tuesday 28 August, in Dunluce Parish Church. Lady Macnaghten died in 2020.

Baronetage of the United Kingdom
Preceded by Antony Macnaghten	Baronet (of Dundarave); 1972–2007	Succeeded by Malcolm Francis Macnaghten
