= John O'Neill, 3rd Viscount O'Neill =

Irish politician (1780–1855)

Mr O'Neill's Indemnity Act 1812
- Act of Parliament
- Parliament of the United Kingdom
- Long title: An Act to relieve the Honourable John Bruce Richard O'Neill, who was elected to serve in this present Parliament for the County of Antrim, from certain Penalties which he has incurred by sitting and voting in the House of Commons without having taken the Oaths, and in other Respects conformed to the Laws in such Case made and provided.
- Citation: 52 Geo. 3. c. 33 Pr.

Dates
- Royal assent: 5 May 1812

John Bruce Richard O'Neill, 3rd Viscount O'Neill (30 December 1780 – 12 February 1855) was an Irish Tory politician who sat in the House of Commons from 1802 to 1841 and then in the House of Lords.

O'Neill was the son of John, Viscount O'Neill and his wife Henrietta Frances Boyle.

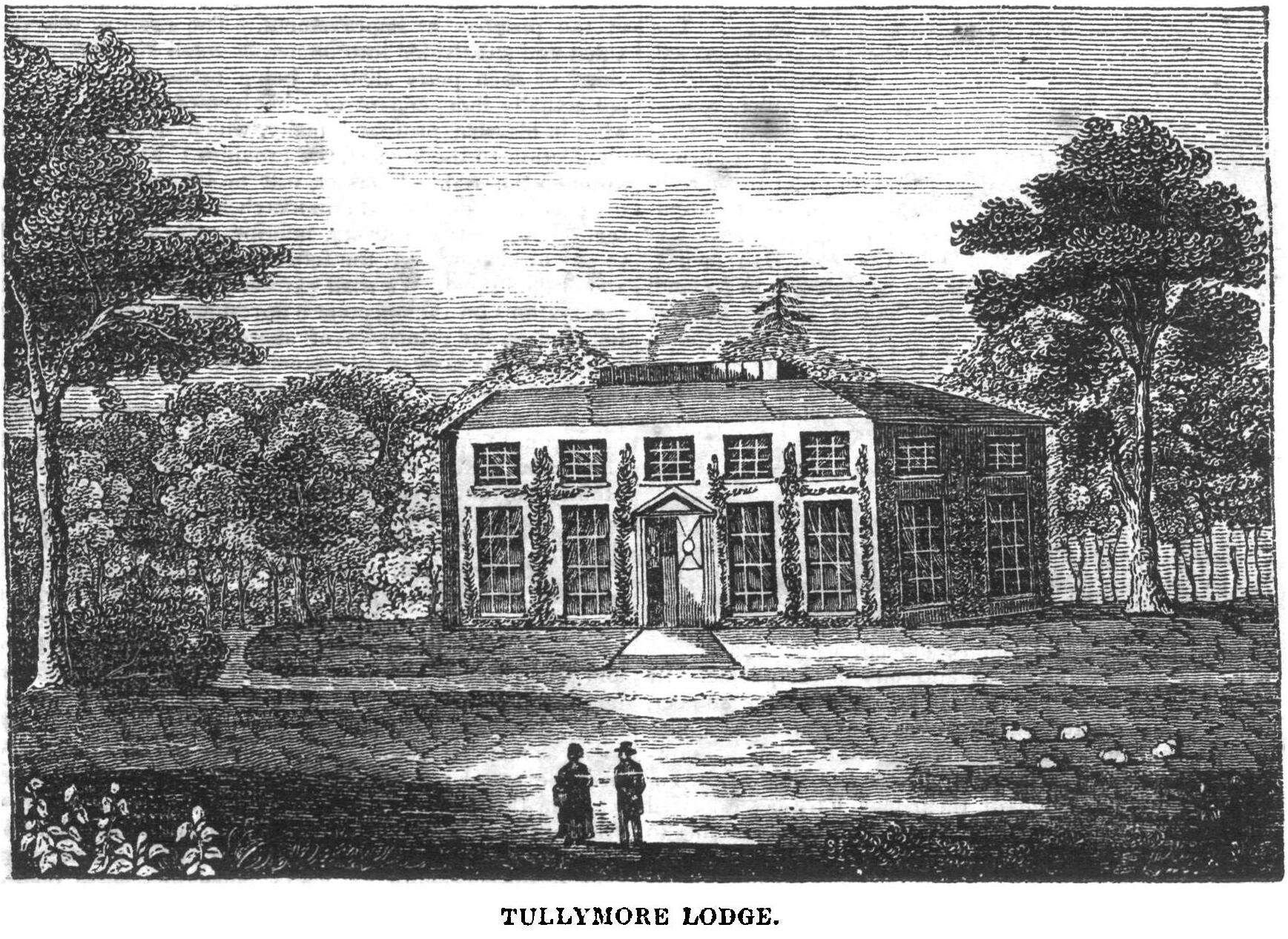
O'Neill's home Tullymore Lodge, near Broughshane, 1835

In 1802 O'Neill was elected Member of Parliament (MP) for Antrim. He held the seat until 1841 when he inherited the title Viscount O'Neill from his brother Charles O'Neill, 1st Earl O'Neill.

O'Neill died at the age of 74. His title became extinct, but his estates passed to a relative, William Chichester, who subsequently assumed the surname O'Neill and received the Barony of O'Neill.

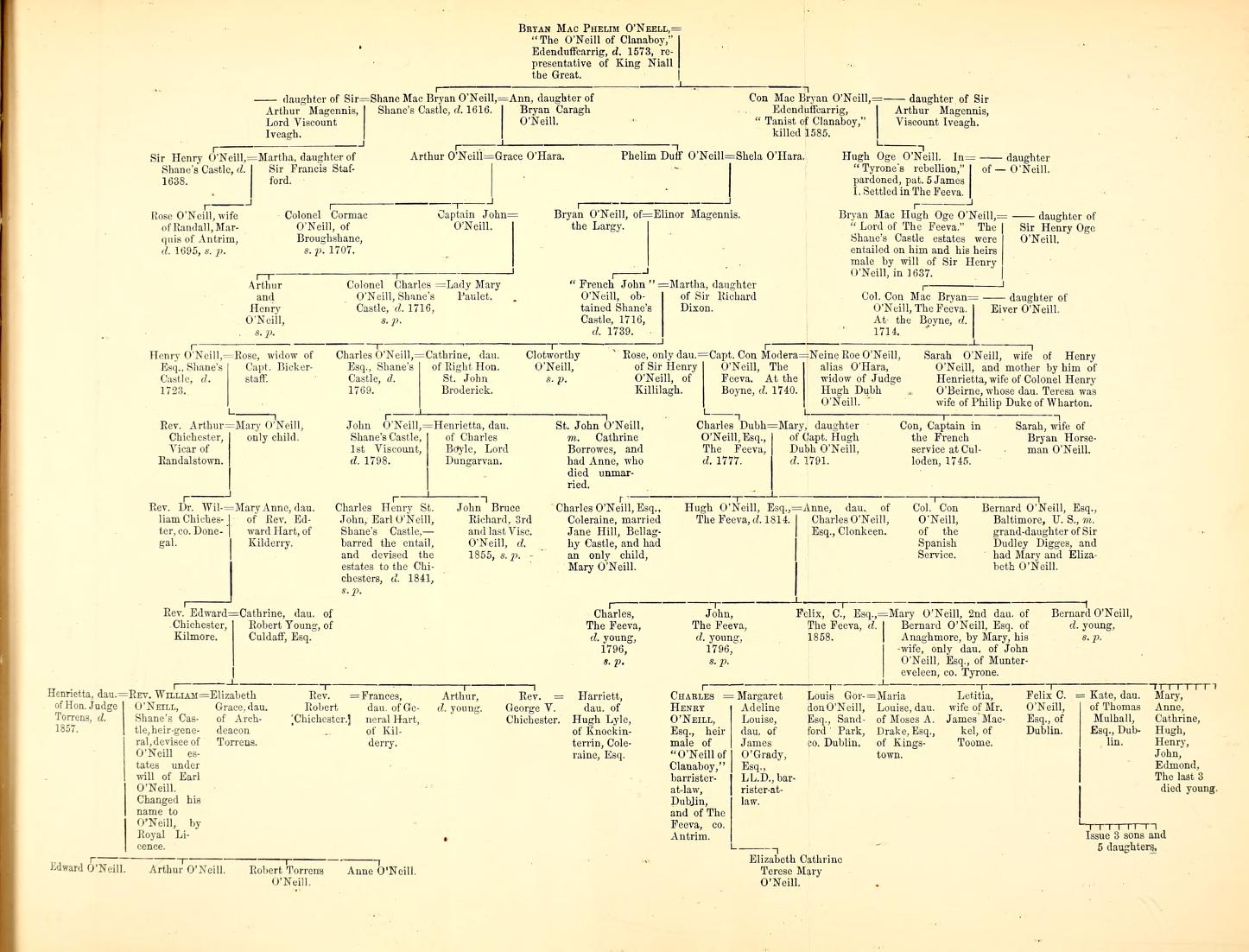
O'Neill Conroy family tree

Parliament of the United Kingdom
Preceded by John Staples; Edmond Alexander MacNaghten	Member of Parliament for Antrim; 1802 – 1841; With: Edmond Alexander MacNaghten to 1812; Earl of Yarmouth 1812–18; Hugh Henry John Seymour 1818–22; Earl of Yarmouth 1822–26; Edmond Alexander McNaghten 1826–30; Earl of Belfast 1830–37; John Irving from 1837	Succeeded by John Irving; Nathaniel Alexander
Peerage of Ireland
Preceded by Charles O'Neill	Viscount O'Neill; 1841–1855	Extinct
Political offices
Preceded by The Viscount Gort	Representative peer for Ireland; 1843–1855	Succeeded by The Viscount Dungannon
