= 1869 County Antrim by-election =

UK parliamentary by-election

The 1869 Antrim by-election was fought on 21 August 1869. The by-election was fought due to the death of the incumbent MP of the Conservative Party, George Henry Seymour. It was won by the Conservative candidate Hugh de Grey Seymour.
