= Nathaniel Alexander =

Nathaniel Alexander may refer to:

- Nathaniel Alexander (governor) (1756–1808), governor of the U.S. state of North Carolina, 1805–1807
- Nathaniel Alexander (bishop) (1760–1840), Anglican bishop in Ireland
- Nathaniel Alexander (MP) (1815–1853), Irish politician
- Nathaniel Alexander, inventor of the folding chair equipped with a book rest
