= Edward Pakenham (disambiguation) =

Edward Pakenham (1778–1815), Anglo-Irish Army officer.

Edward Pakenham may also refer to:

- Edward Pakenham (Irish politician) (died 1721), MP for County Westmeath
- Edward Pakenham, 2nd Baron Longford (1743–1792), Anglo-Irish sailor, landowner and politician
- Edward Michael Pakenham, later Edward Michael Conolly (1786–1849), MP for Donegal
- Edward William Pakenham (1819–1854), Anglo-Irish soldier and MP for Antrim
- Edward Pakenham, 6th Earl of Longford (1902–1961), Anglo-Irish politician and littérateur
