= Sir Francis Workman-Macnaghten, 3rd Baronet =

Anglo-Irish army officer and baronet

Sir Francis Edmund Workman-Macnaghten, 3rd Baronet PC(I) (9 July 1828 – 21 July 1911) was an Anglo-Irish British Army officer and baronet.

== Biography ==
Workman-Macnaghten was the eldest son of Sir Edmund Workman-Macnaghten, Bt and Mary Gwatkin, only child of Edward Gwatkin. His younger brother was Edward Macnaghten, Baron Macnaghten.

In 1876, he succeeded to his father's baronetcy. He was a lieutenant-colonel in the 8th Hussars and served in the Crimean War. On 21 May 1890, he was appointed Lord Lieutenant of Antrim and in 1906 he was made a member of the Privy Council of Ireland.

He married Alice Mary Russell on 6 June 1866. They divorced in 1883 having had four children.

Baronetage of the United Kingdom
| Preceded by Edmund Workman-Macnaghten | Baronet (of Bushmills House); 1876–1911 | Succeeded by Edward Macnaghten |
