= Gilchrist MacNachtan =

Scottish magnate

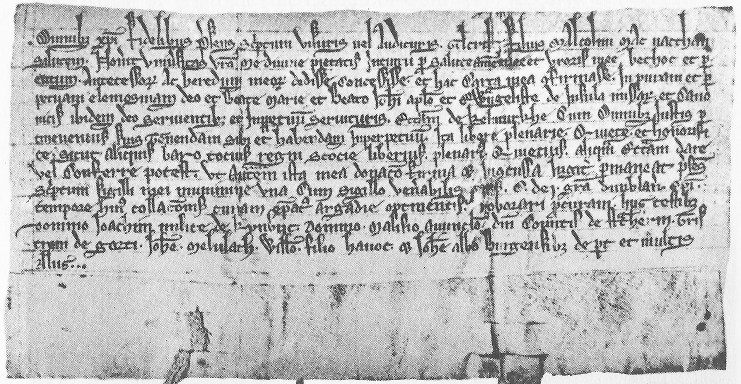
Charter of Gilchrist to Inchaffray Abbey, dating to about 1247.

Gilchrist MacNachtan (also known as Cristinus), son of Malcolm MacNachtan, was a thirteenth-century Scottish magnate.

Gilchrist was likely a native of Lorne. Two charters, dating to about 1246 and 1247 respectively, reveal that he made two grants of the church of Kilmorich, located at the head of Loch Fyne, to Inchaffray Abbey. The first grant describes Gilchrist as a "baron of the realm", and both grants record the name of his wife, Bethoc, and the name of his father, Malcolm MacNachtan. A seal of green wax is attached to the second charter is blazoned a bend surmounted of a label of five points in chief, and reads in Latin "S Gilecrist Macnachten". The seal's heraldic elements may be evidence that Gilecrist's family was related to the Bissetts.

In 1267, Alexander III, King of Scots granted Gilchrist the custody of the castle on Fraoch Eilean, an island in the northern end of Loch Awe. The king's charter to Gilchrist states that the latter was to hold the castle of the king, and to be prepared to offer hospitality to the king whenever he should wish to visit. There is reason to suspect that the charter documenting the grant is spurious. Be that as it may, such a grant fits into the context of ongoing consolidation of Scottish royal power in the western fringes of the kingdom in the years following the Treaty of Perth. The earliest phase of construction at the castle site dates to the twelfth- and thirteenth-centuries, and the castle's remains dating from this period closely resemble the earliest remains of Castle Sween.

In 1277, an indenture between Hugh of Abernethy and Gilchrist's widow, Ethena, records that the latter possessed a third of Gilchrist's lands "by right of and by the law of the land". It is uncertain whether the form of Ethena's name in this source is a Latinised form of Bethoc's name, or if Ethena was a latter wife of Gilchrist. Gilchrist is one of the earliest members of Clan Macnaghten to appear on record—his father being the earliest. Other contemporary sources reveal that Gilchrist had two brothers, Ath and Gilbert.
