= Edmond Alexander MacNaghten =

Irish politician

Edmond Alexander MacNaghten (2 August 1762 – 15 March 1832) was an Irish Tory politician from County Antrim. He sat in the Irish House of Commons from 1797 until the Act of Union in 1800, and then in the House of Commons of the United Kingdom from 1801 to 1830.

He was the oldest son of Edmund MacNaghten of Beardiville House (between Coleraine and Bushmills, County Antrim). His mother Hannah was a daughter of John Johnstone of Belfast. MacNaghten was educated at Glasgow University and at Lincoln's Inn.

In the Irish House of Commons he sat for County Antrim from 1797 until the Union, then he was a Member of Parliament (MP) for Antrim at Westminster until 1812. From 1812 to 1826 he was an MP for Orford in Suffolk, before sitting again for Antrim until 1830.

MacNaghten was High Sheriff of County Antrim from 1793–4, became a trustee of the Irish Linen Board in 1810. He was a Commissioner of the Treasury for Ireland from 1813–17, and for the United Kingdom from March 1819 to July 1830.

In 1818 he was made chief of Clan MacNaghten.

Parliament of Ireland
| Preceded by John Staples; Edward Jones-Agnew | Member of Parliament for County Antrim; 1797 – 1800; With: John Staples | Parliament of Ireland abolished by Act of Union |
Parliament of the United Kingdom
| Preceded by Parliament of Ireland | Member of Parliament for Antrim; 1801 – 1812; With: John Staples to 1802; Hon. John O'Neill from 1802 | Succeeded by Hon. John O'Neill; The Earl of Yarmouth |
| Preceded by William Sloane; Lord Henry Moore | Member of Parliament for Orford; 1812 – March 1820; With: Charles Arbuthnot to 1818; John Douglas from 1818 | Succeeded by Sir Horace Seymour; John Douglas |
| Preceded by Sir Horace Seymour; John Douglas | Member of Parliament for Orford; May 1820 – 1826; With: John Douglas to 1821; Marquess of Londonderry 1821–22; Charles Ross 1822–26 | Succeeded by Sir Horace Seymour; Sir Henry Cooke |
| Preceded by The Earl of Yarmouth; Hon. John O'Neill | Member of Parliament for Antrim; 1826 – 1830; With: Hon. John O'Neill | Succeeded by Earl of Belfast; Hon. John O'Neill |
Honorary titles
| Preceded by Hugh Boyd | High Sheriff of Antrim; 1793 – 1794 | Succeeded by Roger Moore |
