= Horace Seymour =

English army officer and Tory politician

Sir Horace Seymour KCH
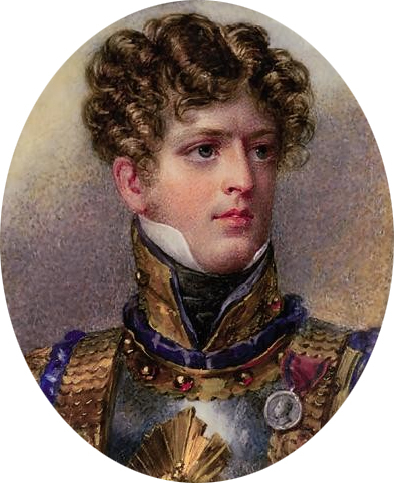
- Born: 22 November 1791
- Died: 23 November 1851 (aged 60); Brighton
- Burial place: St Mary's Parish Church, Hampton
- Relatives: Lord Hugh Seymour (father); Sir George Seymour (brother); Hugh Seymour (brother); Beauchamp Seymour, 1st Baron Alcester (son)
- Military career
- Allegiance: United Kingdom
- Branch: British Army
- Service years: 1811–1819
- Rank: Colonel
- Units: 10th Light Dragoons; 18th Light Dragoons; 1st Life Guards
- Conflicts: Napoleonic Wars; Peninsular War; Battle of Morales; Battle of Vitoria; Battle of Orthez; Battle of Toulouse; Hundred Days; Battle of Waterloo
- Other work: Member of parliament

Colonel Sir Horace Beauchamp Seymour KCH (22 November 1791 – 23 November 1851) was an English army officer and Tory politician.

== Life ==
Horace Seymour was the son of Admiral Lord Hugh Seymour (son of Francis Seymour-Conway, 1st Marquess of Hertford) and Lady Anne Horatia Waldegrave.

At the Battle of Waterloo, Seymour was aide-de-camp to the cavalry commander Lord Uxbridge. He carried the wounded Uxbridge from the battlefield, after he was hit by grapeshot from a cannon. Seymour later recalled that when hit Uxbridge cried out "I have got it at last," to which the Duke of Wellington replied "No? Have you, by God?"

Going into politics as a Peelite, Seymour was Member of Parliament for Lisburn 1819–1826, Orford (1820), Bodmin (1826–1832), Midhurst (1841–45), Antrim (1845–1847), and Lisburn again, 1847–1851.

== Family ==
Seymour married, firstly, Elizabeth Malet Palk, daughter of Sir Lawrence Palk, 2nd Baronet and granddaughter of Sir Robert Palk, on 15 May 1818. He married, secondly, Frances Selina Isabella Poyntz, daughter of William Stephen Poyntz and Hon. Elizabeth Mary Browne, in July 1835. Frances was the widow of the 18th Baron Clinton and was a Lady of the Bedchamber to Queen Adelaide.

By his first wife he had three children;

- Lt.-Col. Charles Francis Seymour (13 September 1819 – 5 November 1854), killed at the Battle of Inkerman
- Frederick Beauchamp Paget Seymour, 1st Baron Alcester (12 April 1821 – 30 March 1895)
- Adelaide Horatia Elizabeth Seymour (27 January 1825 – 29 October 1877), who married Frederick Spencer, 4th Earl Spencer

== Descendants ==
Seymour has many descendants. Notable among them, his daughter Adelaide was the mother of Charles Spencer, 6th Earl Spencer, who was the great-grandfather of Diana, Princess of Wales. Her sons are William, Prince of Wales, and Prince Harry, Duke of Sussex.

Parliament of the United Kingdom
Preceded by John Leslie Foster	Member of Parliament for Lisburn; 1819–1826	Succeeded by Henry Meynell
Preceded by Edmund Alexander Macnaghten; John Douglas	Member of Parliament for Orford; 1820; With: John Douglas	Succeeded by John Douglas; Edmund Alexander Macnaghten
Preceded by Davies Gilbert; John Wilson Croker	Member of Parliament for Bodmin; 1826–1832; With: Davies Gilbert	Succeeded by William Peter; Samuel Thomas Spry
Preceded by Hon. Frederick Spencer	Member of Parliament for Midhurst; 1841–1845	Succeeded by Spencer Horatio Walpole
Preceded by John Irving; Nathaniel Alexander	Member of Parliament for Antrim; 1845–1847; With: Nathaniel Alexander	Succeeded by Nathaniel Alexander; Sir Edmund Workman-Macnaghten, Bt
Preceded by Henry Meynell	Member of Parliament for Lisburn; 1847–1851	Succeeded by Sir James Emerson Tennent
