= Dunderave Castle =

- Near Inverary, Argyle, Scotland
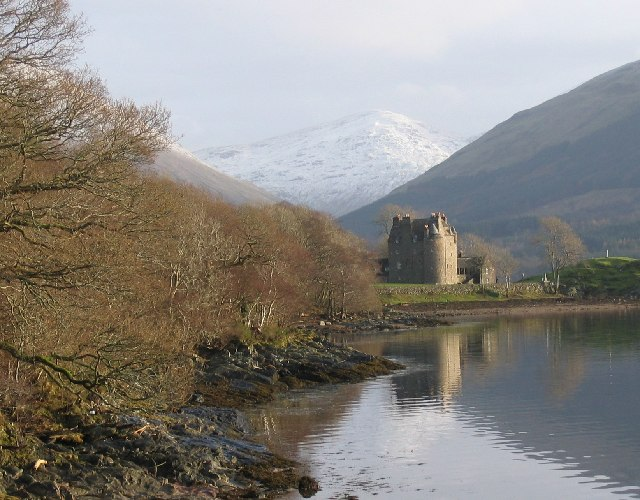
- Dunderave Castle on the shores of Loch Fyne

Site information
- Type: L-Plan Castle

Location
- Shown within Scotland
- Coordinates: 56.242973°N 4.998072°W

Site history
- Built: c.1500
- Built by: MacNaughton clan

Dunderave Castle is an L-plan castle built in the 16th century as the Scottish seat of the MacNaughton clan.

== Description ==
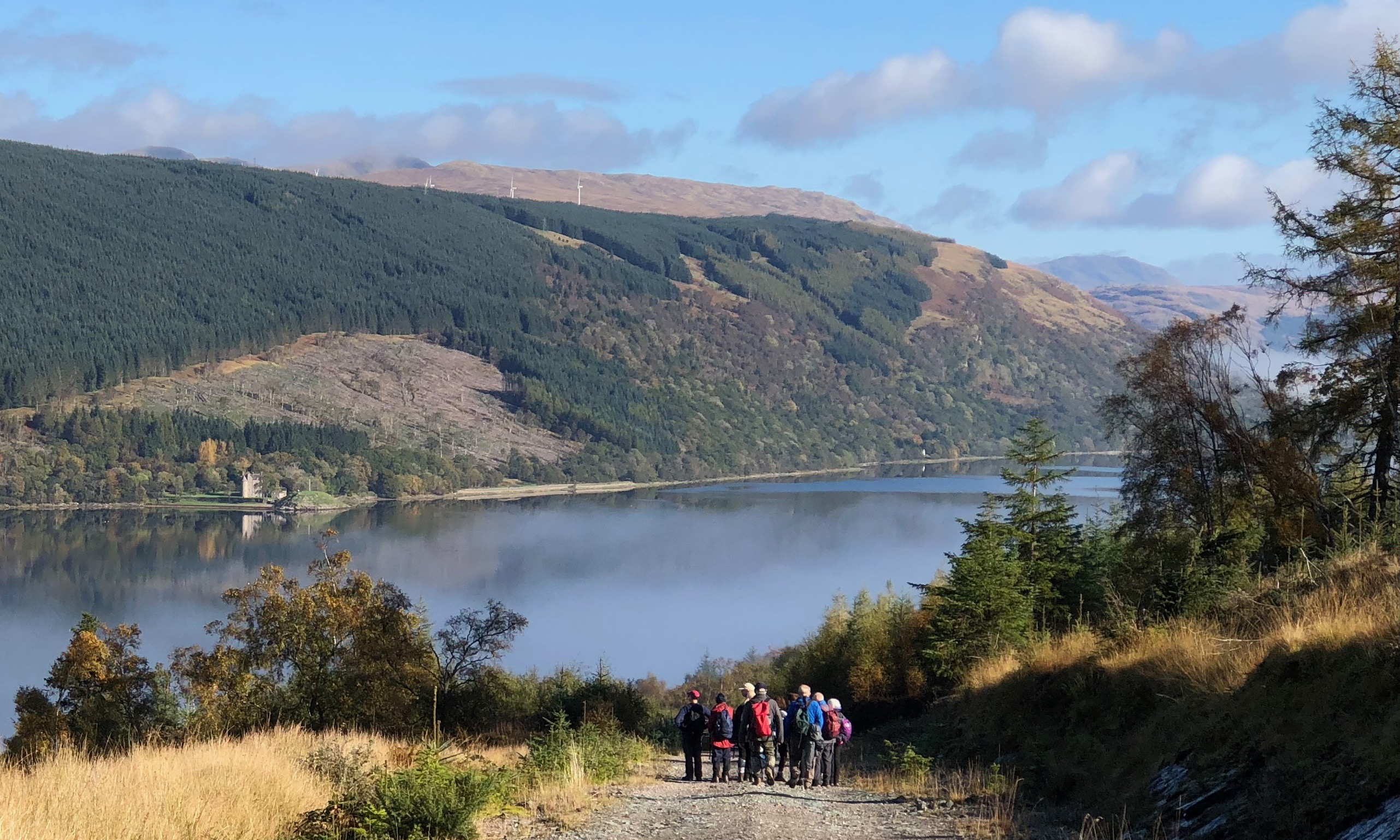
Dunderave Castle seen across Loch Fyne from a hill track above St Catherines

The castle lies on a small promontory on the northern shores of Loch Fyne, around 5 kilometres (3.1 mi) north-east of Inveraray, Argyll. The castle is in use as a residence. The present castle was built after their previous castle was destroyed following a Plague infection. The old castle, and remnants of McNaughton crannógs, can still be seen on the lochan known as the Dubh Loch at the head of Glen Shira.

The name Dunderave is of Gaelic origin. Since the MacNachtans were designated 'of Dunderave' from as early as 1473, the place-name appears to have moved with the clan from the Dubh Loch. It has been suggested that the name derives either from Dun-an-Rudha, meaning 'The Knoll on the Promontory', or else from Dun-da-Ramh, 'The Castle of Two Oars'. The latter is taken to imply that there was a ferry near the site of the castle.

Alexander Campbell of Cawdor visited Dunderave in September 1591.

The castle was restored and remodelled in 1911 by Sir Robert Lorimer relandscaping the gardens at the same time.

The property is currently under private ownership.

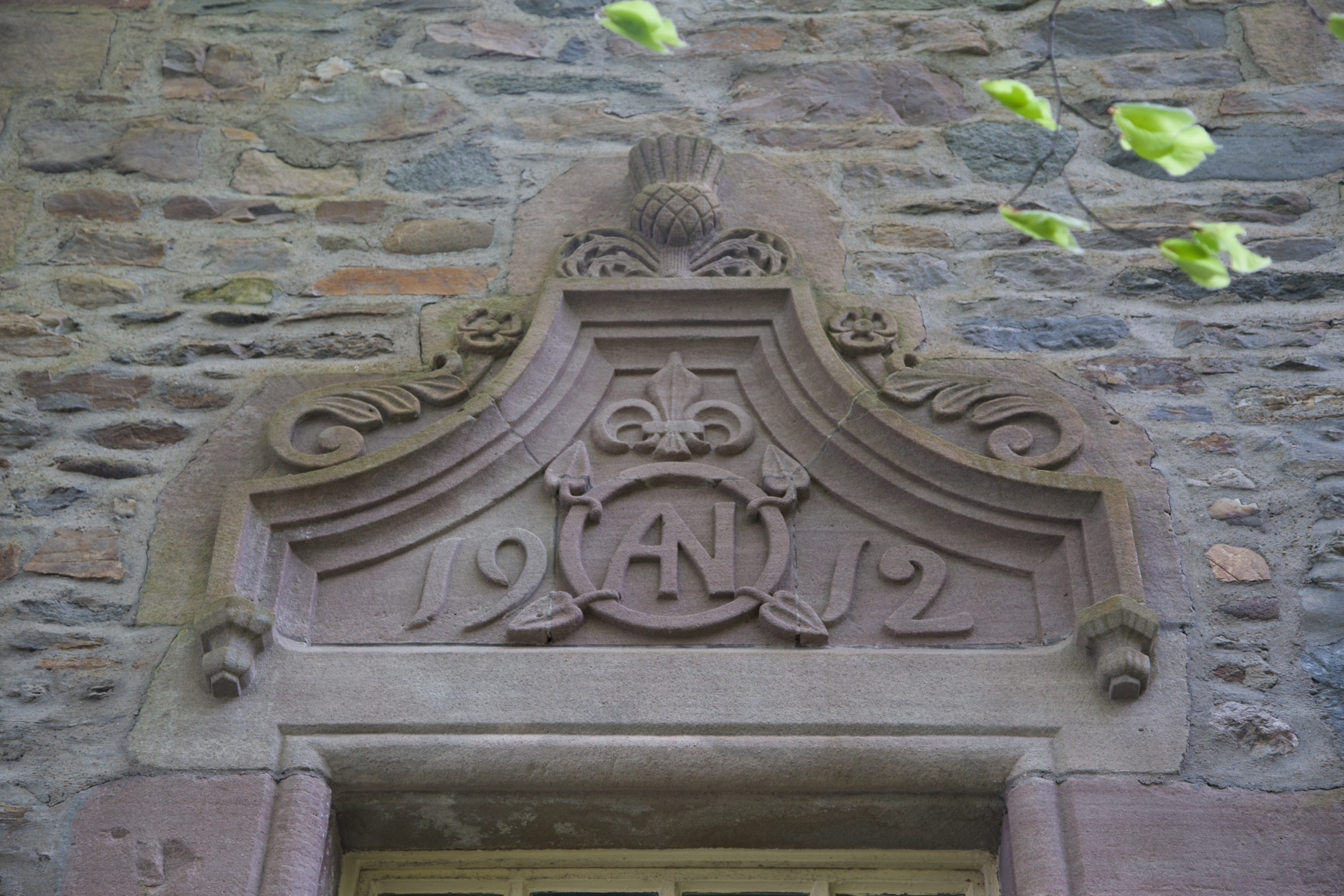
1912 datestone

== See also ==
- Fraoch Eilean, Loch Awe - earlier MacNauchtan castle
- Dundarave House - the Irish seat of the MacNaughton clan

== Bibliography ==
- Cock, Matthew (1998), Dunderave Castle and the MacNachtans of Argyll, Dunderave Estate, ISBN 978-0-9658338-0-6
