= George Hume Macartney =

Irish politician

George Hume Macartney, born George Hume (1793–1869) of Lissanoure, County Antrim was an Irish politician.

In 1814 Hume assumed the surname Macartney under the will of his granduncle, George Macartney, 1st Earl Macartney. He was Conservative MP for Antrim from 1852 to 1858.

Parliament of the United Kingdom
Preceded by Nathaniel Alexander; Edmund Workman-Macnaghten	Member of Parliament for Antrim; 1852–1859; With: Edward William Pakenham to 1855; Thomas Pakenham from 1855	Succeeded by Thomas Pakenham; George Upton
