= John Irving (MP) =

Irish businessman and politician (1766–1845)

John Irving (5 October 1766 – 10 November 1845) was an Irish landowner, industrialist and politician who served as a Member of Parliament.

== Life ==
Irving was the proprietor of the Magheramorne estate in County Antrim in the 19th century and was an improving landlord who encouraged tenants to improve the land through provision of lime for fertilisation, and incentives for those who drained and erected ditches. He also built a row of labourer's cottages which had two acres attached to each to encourage self-sufficiency.

Irving majored in developing what was then known as Ballylig Lime Works, building quays and a railway, and expanding the production. In 1834 130,000 barrels of lime were exported at 10d per barrel, amounting to over £5400. 300 tons of limestone was exported, valued at £22 and 624 tons of flint amounting to a value of £140. Ships traded with County Down, the Clyde, Liverpool, Kintyre and other areas. Flints from Magheramorne quarries were used in the Staffordshire Potteries. Irving died in London in November 1845. His agent at Magheramorne was Thomas Maxwell, who lived at Ballylig House.

The lime works which were established by Irving became the British Portland Cement Company Plant, and subsequently Blue Circle. The cement plant closed at Magheramorne some years ago, but there are plans to develop major adventure park activities at the quarry workings at Magheramorne.

Irving was a Member of the Parliament of the United Kingdom for Bramber, a rotten borough in Sussex, England, 1806–1832 and following its abolition in 1832, for Antrim, 1837–1845

Parliament of the United Kingdom
Preceded by Richard Norman; Henry Jodrell	Member of Parliament for Bramber; 1806 – 1832; With: Henry Jodrell to 1812; William Wilberforce 1812–25; Arthur Gough-Calthorpe 1825–26; Frederick Gough-Calthorpe 1826–31; William Stratford Dugdale 1831–32	Constituency abolished
Preceded by Earl of Belfast; Hon. John O'Neill	Member of Parliament for Antrim; 1837–1845; With: Hon. John O'Neill to 1841; Nathaniel Alexander from 1841	Succeeded by Horace Seymour; Nathaniel Alexander
