= Antrim (UK Parliament constituency) =

Parliamentary constituency in the United Kingdom, 1801–1885 and 1922–1950

- Former county constituency for the House of Commons
- County: County Antrim

1801–1885
- Seats: 2
- Created from: County Antrim
- Replaced by: East Antrim; Mid Antrim; North Antrim; South Antrim

1922–1950
- Seats: 2
- Created from: East Antrim; Mid Antrim; North Antrim; South Antrim
- Replaced by: North Antrim; South Antrim

County Antrim is a former county constituency in the House of Commons of the United Kingdom. It was a two-member constituency in Ireland from 1801 to 1885 and in Northern Ireland from 1922 to 1950.

== History and boundaries ==
The constituency of County Antrim (1801–1885) within Ireland.

County Antrim had been represented by two seats in the Irish House of Commons. From 1801, under the Acts of Union 1800, it was represented by a county constituency with two MPs in the United Kingdom House of Commons. It consisted of County Antrim, except the parts in the parliamentary borough constituencies of Belfast, Carrickfergus and Lisburn. The boroughs of Antrim and Randalstown were disfranchised in 1801.

In 1885, Carrickfergus and Lisburn were disfranchised and the borders of the parliamentary borough of Belfast were extended. The county was split between the divisions of East Antrim, Mid Antrim, North Antrim and South Antrim.

In 1922, following the establishment of the Parliament of Northern Ireland, the number of seats in Northern Ireland at Westminster was cut from 30 to 13 under the Government of Ireland Act 1920. The constituency of Antrim was recreated to elect two MPs, consisting of the administrative county of Antrim, that is the whole of County Antrim excluding the part in the city of Belfast. In 1950, the county was split between the divisions of Antrim North and Antrim South, under the Representation of the People Act 1948, which abolished all multi-member constituencies in the United Kingdom.

== Members of Parliament ==
=== MPs 1801–1885 ===
Election	MP		MP		Note
1801	Rt Hon. John Staples	Nonpartisan	Edmond Alexander MacNaghten	Tory	
1802	Hon. John O'Neill	Tory	Edmond Alexander MacNaghten	Tory	
1806	Hon. John O'Neill	Tory	Edmond Alexander MacNaghten	Tory	
1807	Hon. John O'Neill	Tory	Edmond Alexander MacNaghten	Tory	
1811 b	Hon. John O'Neill	Tory	Edmond Alexander MacNaghten	Tory	O'Neill app. constable of Dublin Castle
1812 b	Hon. John O'Neill	Tory	Edmond Alexander MacNaghten	Tory	O'Neill disqualified
1812	Hon. John O'Neill	Tory	Francis Seymour-Conway	Tory	
1818	Hon. John O'Neill	Tory	Hugh Henry John Seymour	Tory	
1820	Hon. John O'Neill	Tory	Hugh Henry John Seymour	Tory	
1822 b	Hon. John O'Neill	Tory	Richard Seymour-Conway	Tory	
1826	Hon. John O'Neill	Tory	Edmond Alexander MacNaghten	Tory	
1830	Hon. John O'Neill	Tory	George Chichester, Earl of Belfast	Tory	
1831	Hon. John O'Neill	Tory	George Chichester, Earl of Belfast	Whig	
1832	Hon. John O'Neill	Tory	George Chichester, Earl of Belfast	Whig	
1835	Hon. John O'Neill	Conservative	George Chichester, Earl of Belfast	Whig	
1837	Hon. John O'Neill	Conservative	John Irving	Conservative	
1841 b	Nathaniel Alexander	Conservative	John Irving	Conservative	O'Neill succeeds as Viscount O'Neill
1841	Nathaniel Alexander	Conservative	John Irving	Conservative	
1845 b	Nathaniel Alexander	Conservative	Sir Horace Seymour	Conservative	Death of Irving
1847	Nathaniel Alexander	Conservative	Sir Edmund Macnaghten, Bt	Conservative	
1852	Edward William Pakenham	Conservative	George Macartney	Conservative	
1854 b	Thomas Pakenham	Conservative	George Macartney	Conservative	Death of Pakenham
1857	Thomas Pakenham	Conservative	George Macartney	Conservative	
1859	Thomas Pakenham	Conservative	George Upton	Conservative	
1863 b	Thomas Pakenham	Conservative	Hon. Edward O'Neill	Conservative	Upton succeeds as Viscount Templetown
1865	Henry Seymour	Conservative	Hon. Edward O'Neill	Conservative	
1866 b	Henry Seymour	Conservative	Hon. Edward O'Neill	Conservative	Seymour appointed Lord Commissioner of the Admiralty
1868	Henry Seymour	Conservative	Hon. Edward O'Neill	Conservative	
1869 b	Hugh Seymour	Conservative	Hon. Edward O'Neill	Conservative	Death of Seymour
1874	James Chaine	Conservative	Hon. Edward O'Neill	Conservative	
1880	James Chaine	Conservative	Edward MacNaghten	Conservative	
1885 b	William Pirrie Sinclair	Liberal	Edward MacNaghten	Conservative	Death of Chaine

Notes:

- (1) Earl of Yarmouth (1800–1870) was known as Viscount Beauchamp until 17 June 1822.
- (2) Earl of Yarmouth (1843–1912) was known as Hugh de Grey Seymour until 25 August 1870.

=== MPs 1922–1950 ===
Election	MP		MP	
1922	Rt Hon. Charles Craig	UUP	Hugh O'Neill	UUP
1923	Rt Hon. Charles Craig	UUP	Hugh O'Neill	UUP
1924	Rt Hon. Charles Craig	UUP	Hugh O'Neill	UUP
1929	Joseph McConnell	UUP	Hugh O'Neill	UUP
1931	Joseph McConnell	UUP	Hugh O'Neill	UUP
1935	Joseph McConnell	UUP	Hugh O'Neill	UUP
1943 b	John Dermot Campbell	UUP	Hugh O'Neill	UUP
1945	Samuel Gillmor Haughton	UUP	Hugh O'Neill	UUP
1950	Constituency abolished. See North Antrim and South Antrim			

== Elections ==
In two-member elections the bloc voting system was used. Voters could cast a vote for one or two candidates, as they chose. The two candidates with the largest number of votes were elected. In by-elections, to fill a single seat, the first past the post system applied.

There was no election in 1801. The representatives of the county in the former Parliament of Ireland became members of the 1st Parliament of the United Kingdom.

After 1832, when registration of voters was introduced, a turnout figure is given for contested elections. In two-member elections, when the exact number of participating voters is unknown, this is calculated by dividing the number of votes by two. To the extent that voters did not use both their votes this will be an underestimate of turnout. If the electorate figure is unknown the last known electorate figure is used to provide an estimate of turnout.

Where a party had more than one candidate in one or both of a pair of successive elections change is calculated for each individual candidate, otherwise change is based on the party vote.

=== Elections in the 1940s ===
General election 5 July 1945: Antrim (2 seats)
Party	Candidate	Votes	%	±%
UUP	Hugh O'Neill	57,259	42.6	N/A
UUP	Samuel Gillmor Haughton	57,232	42.5	N/A
NI Labour	Henry Holmes	18,403	13.7	N/A
Majority		38,829	28.8	N/A
Turnout		134,528	56.2	N/A
UUP hold		Swing		

By-Election 11 February 1943: Antrim
Party	Candidate	Votes	%	±%
UUP	John Dermot Campbell	42,371	69.4	N/A
NI Labour	Robert Getgood	17,253	28.3	New
Progressive Unionist	Reginald Hanson Press	1,432	2.4	New
Majority		25,118	41.1	N/A
Turnout		135,795	45.0	N/A
UUP hold		Swing	N/A	

- Seat vacant at dissolution (Death of Campbell)

=== Elections in the 1930s ===
General election 14 November 1935: Antrim (2 seats)
Party	Candidate	Votes	%	±%
UUP	Joseph McConnell	Unopposed	N/A	N/A
UUP	Hugh O'Neill	Unopposed	N/A	N/A

General election 27 October 1931: Antrim (2 seats)
Party	Candidate	Votes	%	±%
UUP	Joseph McConnell	Unopposed	N/A	N/A
UUP	Hugh O'Neill	Unopposed	N/A	N/A

=== Elections in the 1920s ===
General election 30 May 1929: Antrim (2 seats)
Party	Candidate	Votes	%	±%
UUP	Hugh O'Neill	53,864	37.5	−11.5
UUP	Joseph McConnell	52,851	36.8	−12.2
Ulster Liberal	George Henderson	18,985	13.2	New
Ulster Liberal	Robert Boyd	17,824	12.4	New
Majority		33,866	23.6	−23.4
Turnout		123,474	58.6	−5.6
UUP hold		Swing	N/A	

General election 29 October 1924: Antrim (2 seats)
Party	Candidate	Votes	%	±%
UUP	Charles Craig	60,868	49.0	N/A
UUP	Hugh O'Neill	60,764	49.0	N/A
Sinn Féin	William McCormick	2,514	2.0	New
Majority		58,250	47.0	N/A
Turnout		98,616	64.2	N/A
UUP hold		Swing		

General election 6 December 1923: Antrim (2 seats)
Party	Candidate	Votes	%	±%
UUP	Charles Craig	Unopposed	N/A	N/A
UUP	Hugh O'Neill	Unopposed	N/A	N/A

General election 15 November 1922: Antrim (2 seats)
Party	Candidate	Votes	%	±%
UUP	Charles Craig	Unopposed	N/A	N/A
UUP	Hugh O'Neill	Unopposed	N/A	N/A

=== Elections in the 1880s ===
By-election, 21 May 1885: County Antrim
Party	Candidate	Votes	%	±%
Liberal	William Pirrie Sinclair	3,971	50.9	+2.6
Conservative	Robert Torrens O'Neill	3,832	49.1	−2.6
Majority		139	1.8	N/A
Turnout		7,803	66.7	−16.5
Registered electors		11,701		
Liberal gain from Conservative		Swing	+2.6	

General election 6 April 1880: County Antrim (2 seats)
Party	Candidate	Votes	%	±%
Conservative	James Chaine	5,124	26.3	−8.5
Conservative	Edward MacNaghten	4,936	25.4	−7.7
Liberal	Charles Wilson	4,789	24.6	+8.5
Liberal	Samuel Black	4,610	23.7	+7.6
Majority		147	0.8	−0.2
Turnout		9,730 (est)	83.2	+4.1
Registered electors		11,701		
Conservative hold		Swing	−8.5	
Conservative hold		Swing	−7.7	

=== Elections in the 1870s ===
General election 12 February 1874: County Antrim (2 seats)
Party	Candidate	Votes	%	±%
Conservative	James Chaine	4,356	34.8	N/A
Conservative	Edward O'Neill	4,142	33.1	N/A
Liberal	Charles Wilson	4,009	32.1	N/A
Majority		133	1.0	N/A
Turnout		8,258 (est)	79.1 (est)	N/A
Registered electors		10,436		
Conservative hold				
Conservative hold				

=== Elections in the 1860s ===
By-election, 21 August 1869: County Antrim
Party	Candidate	Votes	%	±%
Conservative	Hugh Seymour	5,588	70.9	N/A
Liberal	Robert Shafto Adair	2,294	29.1	New
Majority		3,294	41.8	N/A
Turnout		7,882	67.3	N/A
Registered electors		11,715		
Conservative hold		Swing	N/A	

- Caused by Seymour's death.
- Note: Hugh Seymour was known as the Earl of Yarmouth from 25 August 1870.

General election 23 November 1868: County Antrim (2 seats)
Party	Candidate	Votes	%	±%
Conservative	Edward O'Neill	Unopposed		
Conservative	Henry Seymour	Unopposed		
Registered electors		11,715		
Conservative hold				
Conservative hold				

By-election, 17 July 1866: County Antrim
Party	Candidate	Votes	%	±%
Conservative	Henry Seymour	Unopposed		
Registered electors		10,921		
Conservative hold				

- Caused by Seymour's appointment as Lord Commissioner of the Admiralty.

General election 22 July 1865: County Antrim (2 seats)
Party	Candidate	Votes	%	±%
Conservative	Edward O'Neill	Unopposed		
Conservative	Henry Seymour	Unopposed		
Registered electors		10,921		
Conservative hold				
Conservative hold				

By-election, 6 May 1863: County Antrim
Party	Candidate	Votes	%	±%
Conservative	Edward O'Neill	Unopposed		
Registered electors		10,195		
Conservative hold				

- Caused by Upton's succession to the peerage, becoming Viscount Templetown.

=== Elections in the 1850s ===
General election 10 May 1859: County Antrim (2 seats)
Party	Candidate	Votes	%	±%
Conservative	Thomas Pakenham	Unopposed		
Conservative	George Upton	Unopposed		
Registered electors		9,822		
Conservative hold				
Conservative hold				

General election 16 April 1857: County Antrim (2 seats)
Party	Candidate	Votes	%	±%
Conservative	Thomas Pakenham	4,686	44.4	N/A
Conservative	George Hume Macartney	4,341	41.1	N/A
Whig	Henry Hutchinson Hamilton O'Hara	1,533	14.5	New
Majority		2,808	26.6	N/A
Turnout		6,047 (est)	62.5 (est)	N/A
Registered electors		9,676		
Conservative hold		Swing	N/A	
Conservative hold		Swing	N/A	

By-election, 27 December 1854: County Antrim
Party	Candidate	Votes	%	±%
Conservative	Thomas Pakenham	Unopposed		
Conservative hold				

- Caused by Pakenham's death

General election 23 July 1852: County Antrim (2 seats)
Party	Candidate	Votes	%	±%
Conservative	Edward William Pakenham	Unopposed		
Conservative	George Macartney	Unopposed		
Registered electors		8,207		
Conservative hold				
Conservative hold				

=== Elections in the 1840s ===
General election 11 August 1847: County Antrim (2 seats)
Party	Candidate	Votes	%	±%
Conservative	Nathaniel Alexander	Unopposed		
Conservative	Edmund Workman-Macnaghten	Unopposed		
Registered electors		6,962		
Conservative hold				
Conservative hold				

By-election, 22 December 1845: County Antrim
Party	Candidate	Votes	%	±%
Conservative	Horace Seymour	Unopposed		
Conservative hold				

- Caused by Irving's death

General election 13 July 1841: County Antrim (2 seats)
Party	Candidate	Votes	%	±%
Conservative	John Irving	Unopposed		
Conservative	Nathaniel Alexander	Unopposed		
Registered electors		2,157		
Conservative hold				
Conservative hold				

By-election, 14 April 1841: County Antrim
Party	Candidate	Votes	%	±%
Conservative	Nathaniel Alexander	Unopposed		
Conservative hold				

- Caused by O'Neill's succession to the peerage, becoming 3rd Viscount O'Neill

=== Elections in the 1830s ===
General election 5 August 1837: County Antrim (2 seats)
Party	Candidate	Votes	%
Conservative	John O'Neill	Unopposed	
Conservative	John Irving	Unopposed	
Registered electors		4,032	
Conservative hold			
Conservative gain from Whig			

General election 15 January 1835: County Antrim (2 seats)
Party	Candidate	Votes	%
Conservative	John O'Neill	Unopposed	
Whig	George Chichester	Unopposed	
Registered electors		3,822	
Conservative hold			
Whig hold			

General election 2 January 1833: County Antrim (2 seats)
Party	Candidate	Votes	%
Tory	John O'Neill	1,719	28.9
Whig	George Chichester	1,654	27.8
Tory	Edmund McDonnell	1,451	24.4
Tory	John Cromie	1,133	19.0
Turnout		3,026	86.8
Registered electors		3,487	
Majority		65	1.1
Tory hold			
Majority		203	3.4
Whig hold			

General election 21 May 1831: County Antrim (2 seats)
Party	Candidate	Votes	%
Tory	John O'Neill	Unopposed	
Whig	George Chichester	Unopposed	
Tory hold			
Whig gain from Tory			

General election 13 August 1830: Antrim (2 seats)
Party	Candidate	Votes	%
Tory	John O'Neill	839	40.1
Tory	George Chichester	719	34.4
Tory	Edmund McDonnell	523	25.0
Non Partisan	Mark Kerr	10	0.5
Majority		196	9.4
Turnout		c. 1,046	c. 51.3
Registered electors		2,037	
Tory hold			
Tory hold			

=== Elections in the 1820s ===
General election 20 June 1826: Antrim (2 seats)
Party	Candidate	Votes	%	±%
Tory	John O'Neill	Unopposed	N/A	N/A
Tory	Edmond Alexander MacNaghten	Unopposed	N/A	N/A

1822 County Antrim by-election
Party	Candidate	Votes	%	±%
Tory	Richard Seymour-Conway	Unopposed	N/A	N/A
Tory hold				

General election 22 March 1820: Antrim (2 seats)
Party	Candidate	Votes	%	±%
Tory	John O'Neill	Unopposed	N/A	N/A
Tory	Hugh Henry John Seymour	Unopposed	N/A	N/A

=== Elections in the 1810s ===
General election 27 June 1818: Antrim (2 seats)
Party	Candidate	Votes	%	±%
Tory	John O'Neill	Unopposed	N/A	N/A
Tory	Hugh Henry John Seymour	Unopposed	N/A	N/A

General election 21 October 1812: Antrim (2 seats)
Party	Candidate	Votes	%	±%
Tory	John O'Neill	Unopposed	N/A	N/A
Tory	Francis Seymour-Conway	Unopposed	N/A	N/A

1812 County Antrim by-election
Party	Candidate	Votes	%	±%
Tory	John O'Neill	Unopposed	N/A	N/A
Tory hold				

1811 County Antrim by-election
Party	Candidate	Votes	%	±%
Tory	John O'Neill	Unopposed	N/A	N/A
Tory hold				

=== Elections in the 19th century ===
General election 18 May 1807: Antrim (2 seats)
Party	Candidate	Votes	%	±%
Tory	John O'Neill	Unopposed	N/A	N/A
Tory	Edmond Alexander MacNaghten	Unopposed	N/A	N/A

General election 19 November 1806: Antrim (2 seats)
Party	Candidate	Votes	%	±%
Tory	John O'Neill	Unopposed	N/A	N/A
Tory	Edmond Alexander MacNaghten	Unopposed	N/A	N/A

General election 19 July 1802: Antrim (2 seats)
Party	Candidate	Votes	%	±%
Tory	John O'Neill	Unopposed	N/A	N/A
Tory	Edmond Alexander MacNaghten	Unopposed	N/A	N/A

Co-option 1 January 1801: Antrim (2 seats)
Party	Candidate	Votes	%	±%
Non Partisan	John Staples	Co-opted	N/A	N/A
Tory	Edmond Alexander MacNaghten	Co-opted	N/A	N/A
