= Francis Seymour-Conway, 3rd Marquess of Hertford =

British politician

The Most Honourable The Marquess of Hertford KG GCH PC
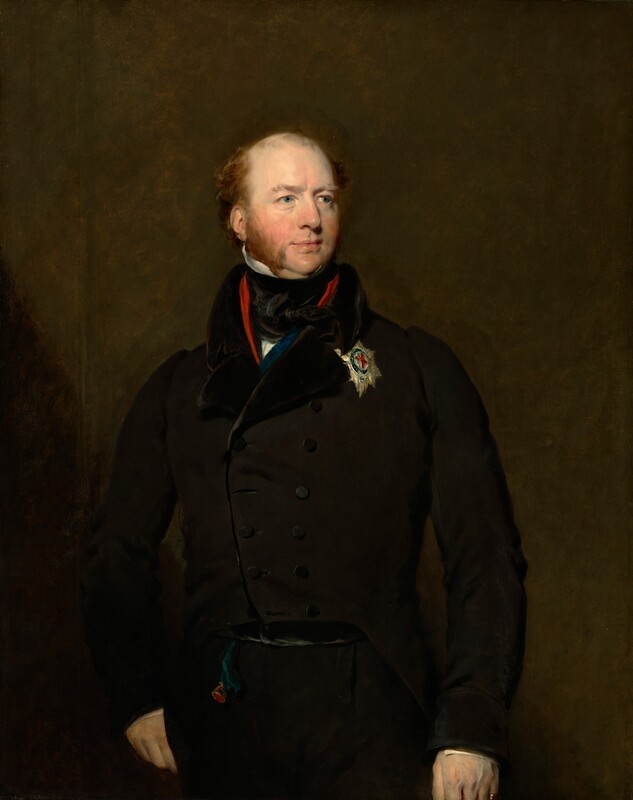
- Portrait of the Marquess of Hertford by Thomas Lawrence, 1823

Vice-Chamberlain of the Household
- In office 14 March 1812 – 28 July 1812
- Monarch: George III
- Prime Minister: Spencer Perceval; The Earl of Liverpool
- Preceded by: Lord John Thynne
- Succeeded by: Viscount Jocelyn

Personal details
- Born: 11 March 1777
- Died: 1 March 1842 (aged 64)
- Party: Tory
- Spouse(s): Maria Emilia Fagnani (1771–1856)
- Children: 3, including Richard

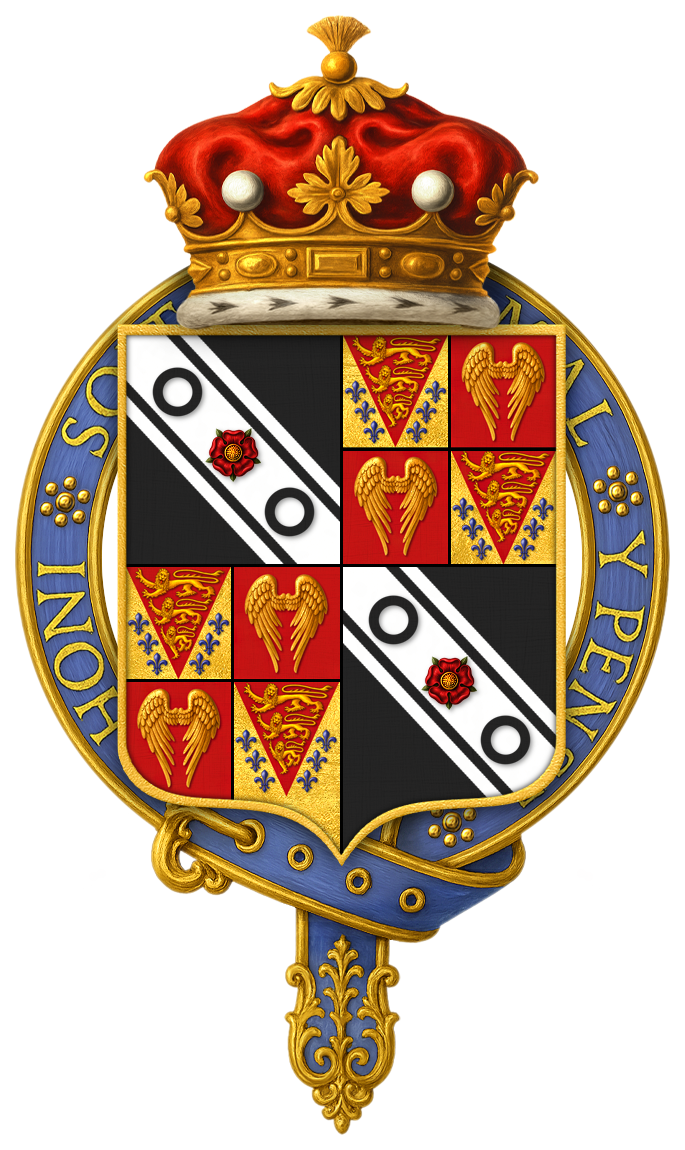
Quartered arms of Francis Seymour-Conway, 3rd Marquess of Hertford, KG, GCH, PC

Francis Charles Seymour-Conway, 3rd Marquess of Hertford (11 March 1777 – 1 March 1842), styled Viscount Beauchamp between 1793 and 1794 and Earl of Yarmouth between 1794 and 1822, of Ragley Hall in Warwickshire and of Sudbourne Hall in Suffolk, was a British Tory politician and art collector.

== Origins ==
Seymour-Conway was the son of Francis Seymour-Conway, 2nd Marquess of Hertford, by his second wife Isabella Anne Ingram, eldest daughter and co-heiress of Charles Ingram, 9th Viscount of Irvine.

== Political career ==
Lord Yarmouth sat as a Member of Parliament (MP) for Orford in Suffolk (which town was situated within his Sudbourne estate) from 1797 to 1802, for Lisburn from 1802 to 1812, for Antrim from 1812 to 1818 and for Camelford from 1820 to 1822. He was Secretary of State for War and the Colonies Viscount Castlereagh's second in his 1809 duel with Foreign Secretary George Canning. In March 1812 he was sworn of the Privy Council and appointed Vice-Chamberlain of the Household under Spencer Perceval. He continued in the post after Lord Liverpool became Prime Minister in May 1812 after Perceval's assassination, but relinquished it in July of that year. The same year he was appointed Lord Warden of the Stannaries, a post he held until his death. He succeeded his father in the marquessate in 1822. The same year he was also made a Knight of the Garter and appointed Vice-Admiral of Suffolk, a post he retained until his death.

== Art collector ==
Assisted by his wife's great fortune, Lord Hertford was a notable art collector, as were his son and illegitimate grandson. Much of his collection survives as the Wallace Collection in Hertford House, London, named after Sir Richard Wallace, 1st Baronet, the illegitimate son of the 4th Marquess.

== Cricket ==
Seymour-Conway was an amateur cricketer who was a member of Marylebone Cricket Club (MCC). As Lord Yarmouth, he made three known appearances in historically important matches (Note: Any match listed in the ACS' Important Match Guide (1981) is historically important, and therefore of the highest standard, whether or not a scorecard might exist. The same applies to numerous matches discovered by researchers since 1981. For further information, see First-class cricket.) between 1797 and 1799, evidently as a guest player. His first was for MCC against Montpelier at Aram's New Ground from 4 to 6 September 1797. He was out without scoring in both innings, and Montpelier won by six wickets. His other two matches were at Lord's Old Ground in August 1799 when he played, first, for England against Surrey, and then for Surrey against England in the return match. Surrey won the first match by 143 runs, and the second by an innings and 147 runs.

In all, Yarmouth scored only four runs, never bowled, and held no catches.

== Marriage and issue ==
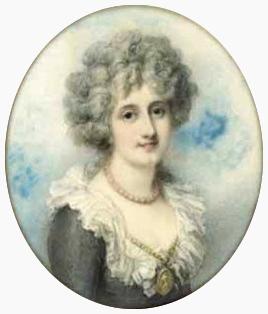
Maria Emilia Fagnani, miniature portrait by Richard Cosway, painted in 1791, at the age of twenty, and eight years before her wedding. Wallace Collection.

On 18 May 1798 he married Maria Emilia Fagnani (1771–1856), known as "Mie-Mie", reputedly the illegitimate daughter of William Douglas, 4th Duke of Queensberry, by his mistress Costanza Brusati ("the Marchesa Fagnani"), the wife of Giacomo II Fagnani, IV marchese di Gerenzano (1740–1785), an Italian nobleman descended from the jurist Raffaele Fagnani (1552–1623), a resident of the Duchy of Milan. Queensbury was the eighth richest man in Britain and having never married, left much of his fortune to Maria, his only offspring. This wealth enabled Hertford to establish his famous art collection, now represented by the Wallace Collection, named after his grandson Sir Richard Wallace, 1st Baronet, the illegitimate son of the 4th Marquess. Sir Richard Wallace had a special fondness for his grandmother Mie-Mie, possibly as both suffered the stigma of illegitimacy, and in his will the 4th Marquess mentions Sir Richard's kindness to his mother. Sir Richard Wallace erected a monument to his grandmother Maria Fagnani in Sudbourne Church, in the form of the stained glass east window, depicting Mary Magdalene, "the prostitute who washed Jesus’s feet with oil but was also the first person to witness the resurrection", seemingly "an intentional reference to Mie-Mie’s circumstances". By Maria Fagnani he had three children:

- Lady Frances Maria Seymour-Conway (d. 1822);
- Richard Seymour-Conway, 4th Marquess of Hertford (1800–1870), eldest son and heir;
- Lord Henry Seymour-Conway (1805–1859), founder of the Jockey Club in Paris. He inherited much of his mother's wealth, and died unmarried in Paris, having bequeathed the residue of his income, about £36,000 per annum, to Paris hospitals. He was buried in his mother's vault in the Cemetery of Père-Lachaise, also the burial place of his nephew Sir Richard Wallace.

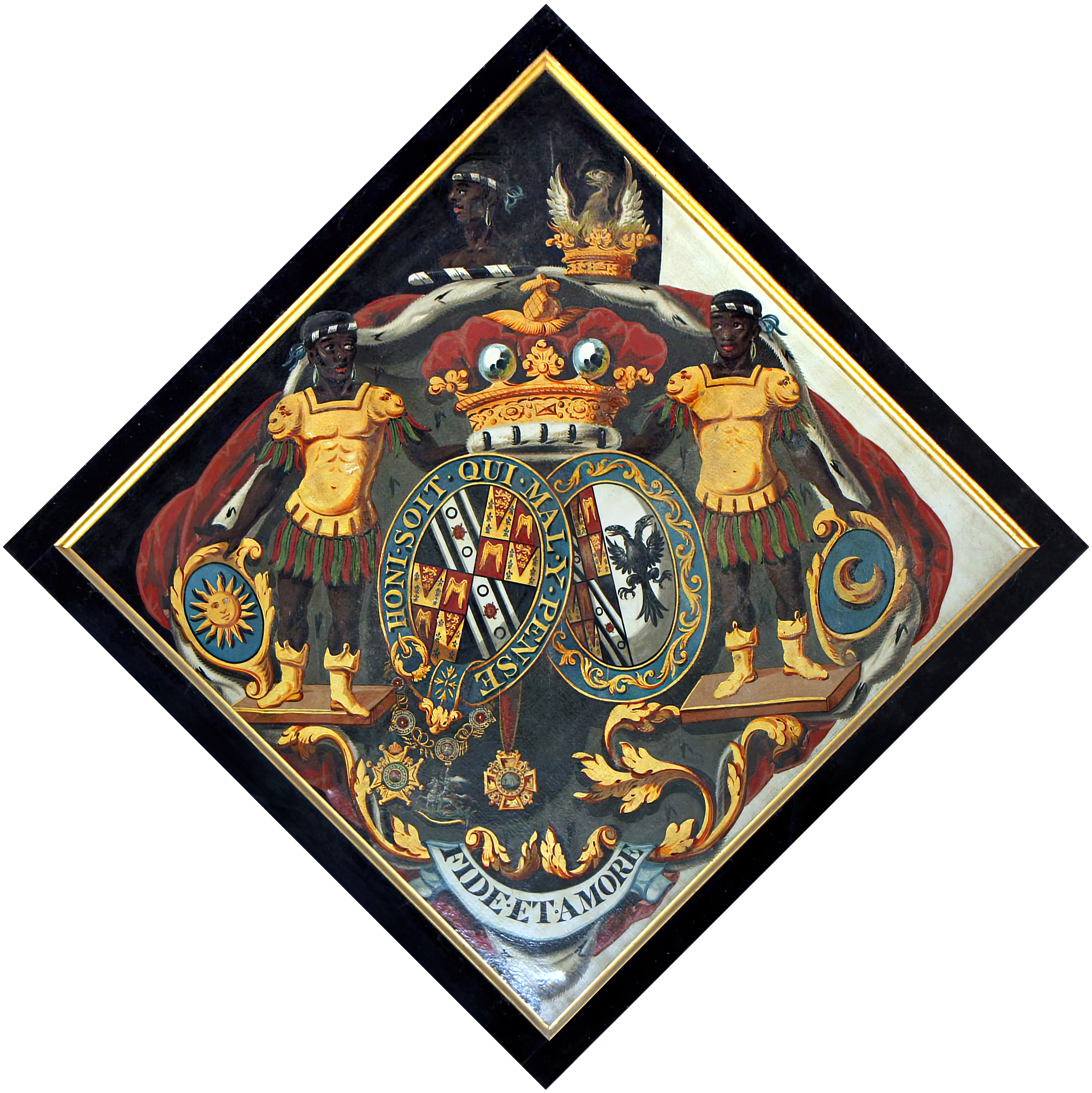
Funeral hatchment of Francis Charles Seymour-Conway, 3rd Marquess of Hertford, Sudbourne Church, Suffolk, showing his arms, circumscribed by the Garter, in alliance with and impaling Fagnani: Argent, an eagle displayed with two heads sable

== Death and succession ==
In Hertford's last years the mental instability which had afflicted several members of his family became noticeable and he is said to have lived with a retinue of prostitutes. The diarist Charles Greville stated of him "there has been, so far as I know, no such example of undisguised debauchery" and described him as broken with infirmities and unable to speak due to paralysis of the tongue. He died in March 1842, aged 64, and was succeeded by his eldest son Richard Seymour-Conway, 4th Marquess of Hertford. The Marchioness of Hertford died in March 1856, aged 84.

== Legacy ==
Lord Hertford was the prototype for the characters of the Marquess of Monmouth in Benjamin Disraeli's 1844 novel Coningsby and Lord Steyne in William Makepeace Thackeray's 1847–8 serial Vanity Fair. Thackeray's illustration of the Marquis for issue 11 was considered to bear such a resemblance to Hertford that threat of prosecution for libel effectively suppressed its publication.

== Bibliography ==
- ACS (1981). A Guide to Important Cricket Matches Played in the British Isles 1709–1863. Nottingham: ACS. OCLC 85045528.
- Haygarth, Arthur (1996) [1862]. Scores & Biographies, Volume 1 (1744–1826). Kennington: Frederick Lillywhite. ISBN 978-19-00592-23-9.

Parliament of the United Kingdom
Preceded by Lord Robert Seymour; Viscount Castlereagh	Member of Parliament for Orford; 1797–1802; With: Lord Robert Seymour	Succeeded by Lord Robert Seymour; James Trail
Preceded by George Hatton	Member of Parliament for Lisburn; 1802–1812	Succeeded by Lord Henry Moore
Preceded by Edmund Alexander Macnaghten; John O'Neill	Member of Parliament for Antrim; 1812–1818; With: John O'Neill	Succeeded by John O'Neill; Hugh Henry John Seymour
Vacant Title last held by John Stewart; Lewis Allsopp	Member of Parliament for Camelford; 1820–1822; With: Mark Milbank	Succeeded by Sheldon Cradock; Mark Milbank
Political offices
Preceded by Lord John Thynne	Vice-Chamberlain of the Household; March–July 1812	Succeeded by Viscount Jocelyn
Court offices
Preceded by Sir Thomas Tyrwhitt	Lord Warden of the Stannaries; 1812–1842	Succeeded by The Prince Consort
Honorary titles
Preceded by The Marquess of Hertford	Vice-Admiral of Suffolk; 1822–1842	Vacant Title next held by The Earl of Stradbroke
Peerage of Great Britain
Preceded by Francis Seymour-Conway	Marquess of Hertford; 1822–1842	Succeeded by Richard Seymour-Conway
