= Portrait of the Marquess of Hertford =

Painting by Thomas Lawrence

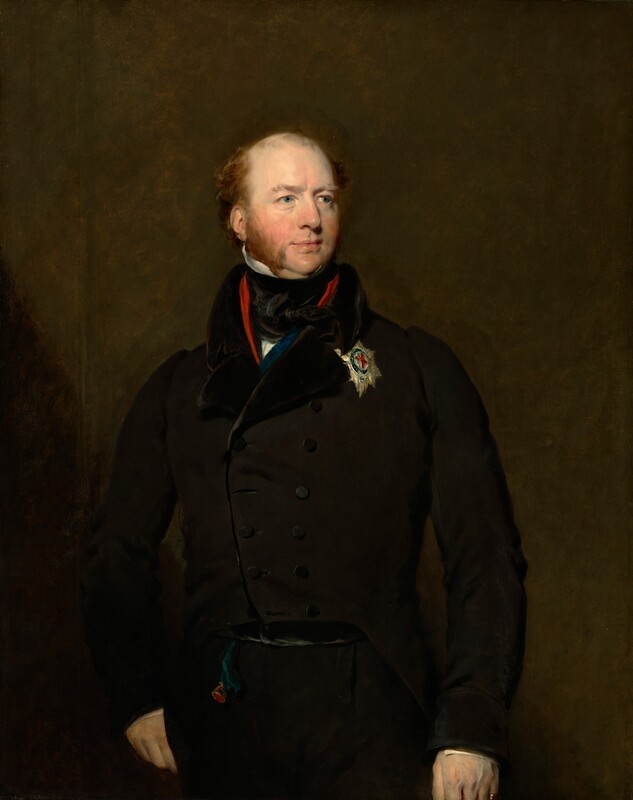
- Artist: Thomas Lawrence
- Year: 1823
- Type: Oil on canvas, portrait painting
- Dimensions: 128.5 cm × 102.2 cm (50.6 in × 40.2 in)
- Location: National Gallery of Art, Washington D.C.

Portrait of the Marquess of Hertford is a c.1823 portrait painting by the British artist Thomas Lawrence. It depicts the politician, courtier and art collector Francis Seymour-Conway, Marquess of Hertford.A prominent figure during the Regency era, Hertford was closely associated with George IV.

The family's home in Manchester Square was later transformed into the Wallace Collection. Hertford was considered by some to be the inspiration behind the character of the Marquess of Monmouth in Benjamin Disraeli's Coningsby and the Marquess of Hertford in William Makepeace Thackeray's Vanity Fair.

Lawrence was the President of the Royal Academy at the time, noted for his stylish portraits. The painting remained in the family until 1899. In 1968 it was acquired by the National Gallery of Art in Washington D.C. A print based on the painting was produced by the engraver William Holl in 1832.

== Bibliography ==
- Duffy, Stephen. The Wallace Collection. Scala, 2005.
- Flavin, Michael. Gambling in the Nineteenth-Century English Novel: A Leprosy is O'er the Land. Liverpool University Press, 2003
- Levey, Michael. Sir Thomas Lawrence. Yale University Press, 2005.
