= Richard Seymour-Conway, 4th Marquess of Hertford =

British peer, politician and art collector

The Most Honourable The Marquess of Hertford KG
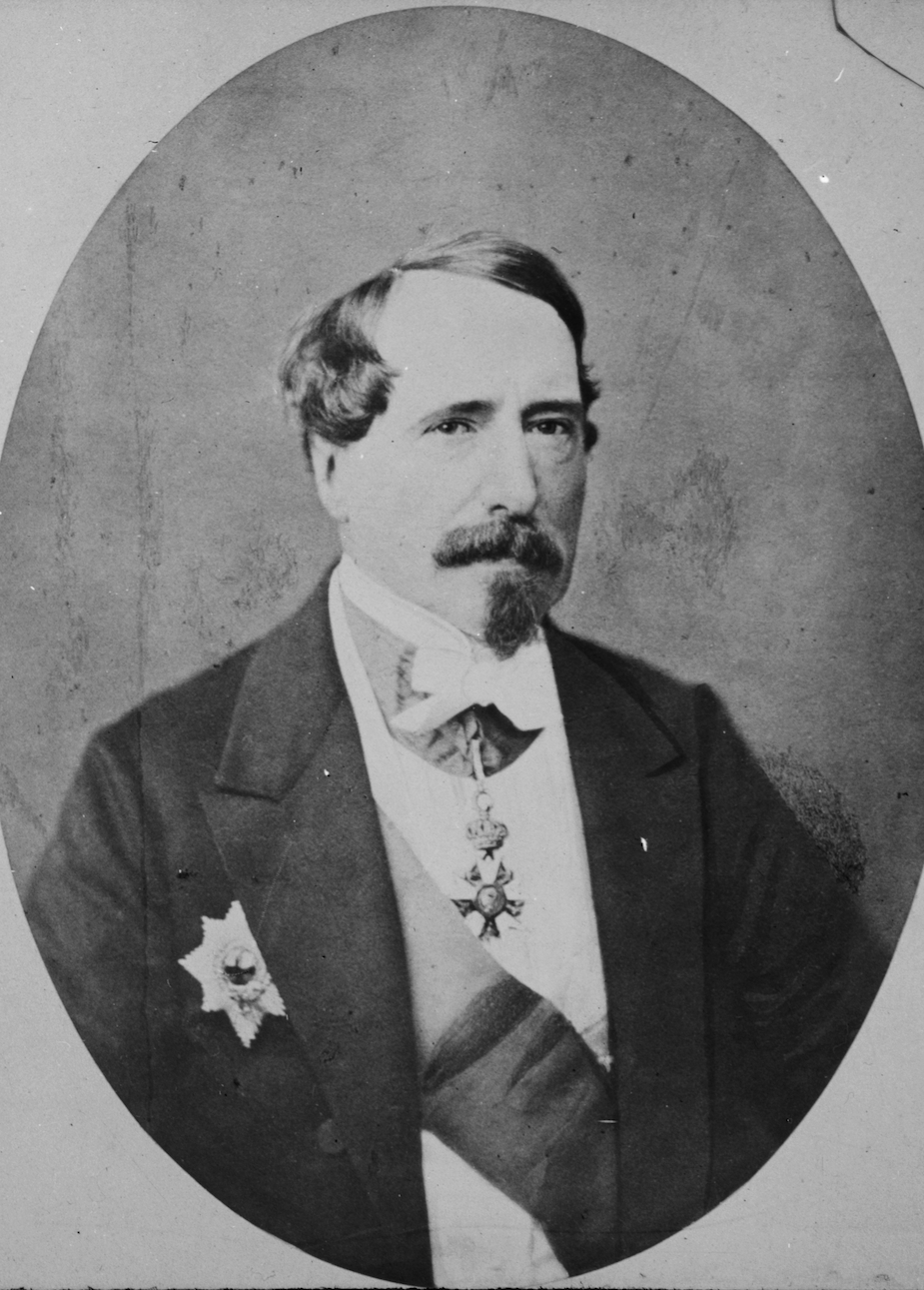
- Portrait c. 1860

Member of Parliament for Antrim
- In office 1822–1826
- Preceded by: Hugh Seymour
- Succeeded by: Edward Macnaghten

Personal details
- Born: 22 February 1800; England
- Died: 25 August 1870 (aged 70); Paris, France
- Children: Sir Richard Wallace, 1st Baronet
- Parent(s): Francis Seymour-Conway, 3rd Marquess of Hertford; Maria Emilia Fagnani

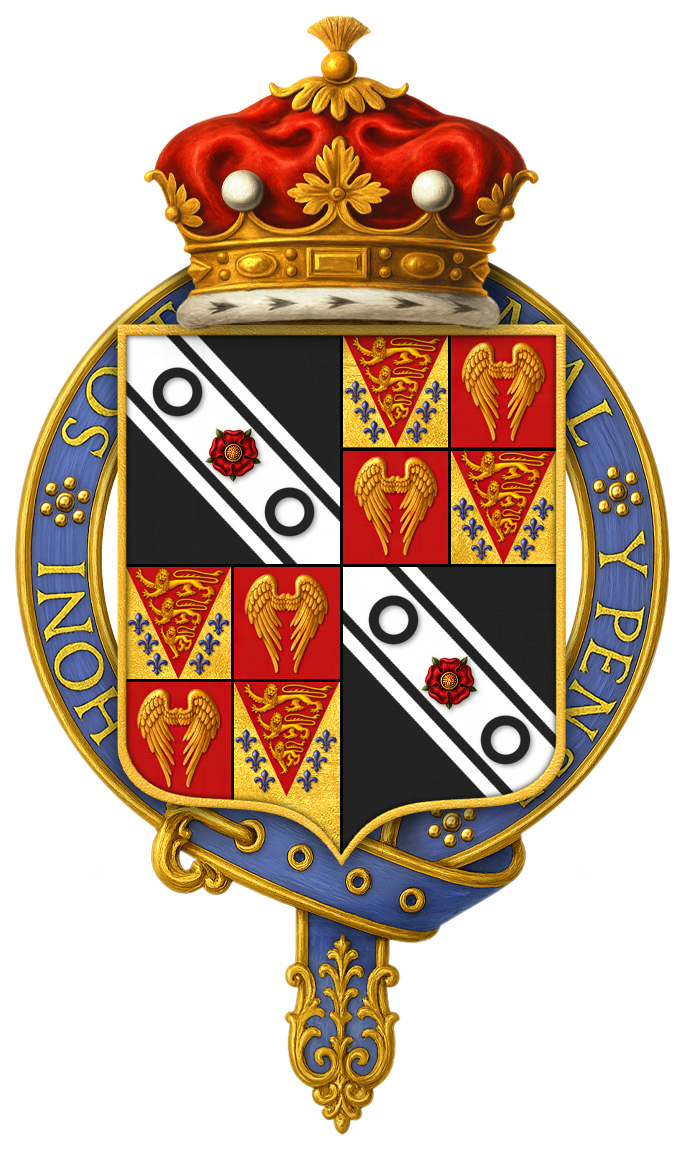
Quartered arms of Richard Seymour-Conway, 4th Marquess of Hertford, KG

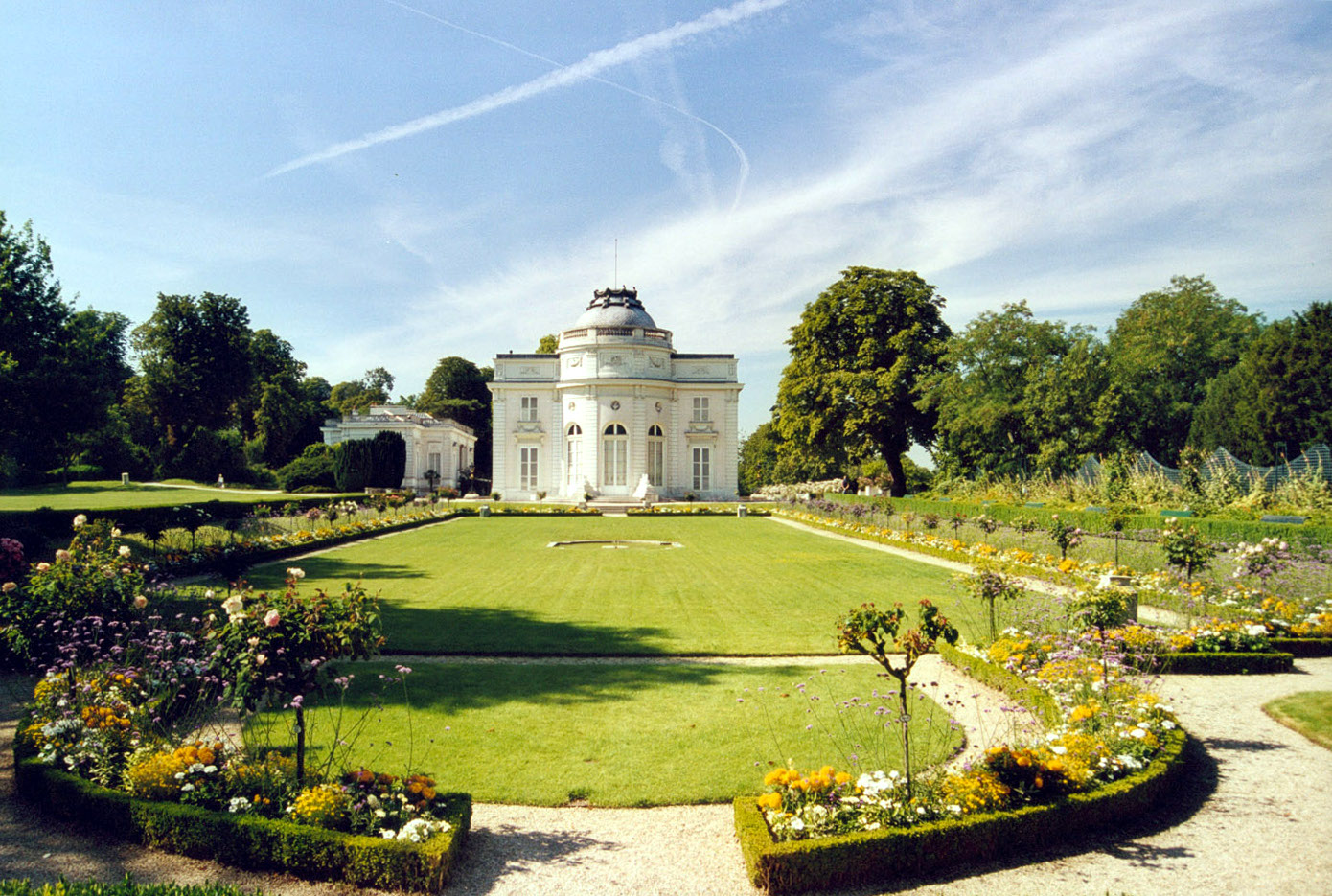
The Château de Bagatelle, Hertford's home from 1848

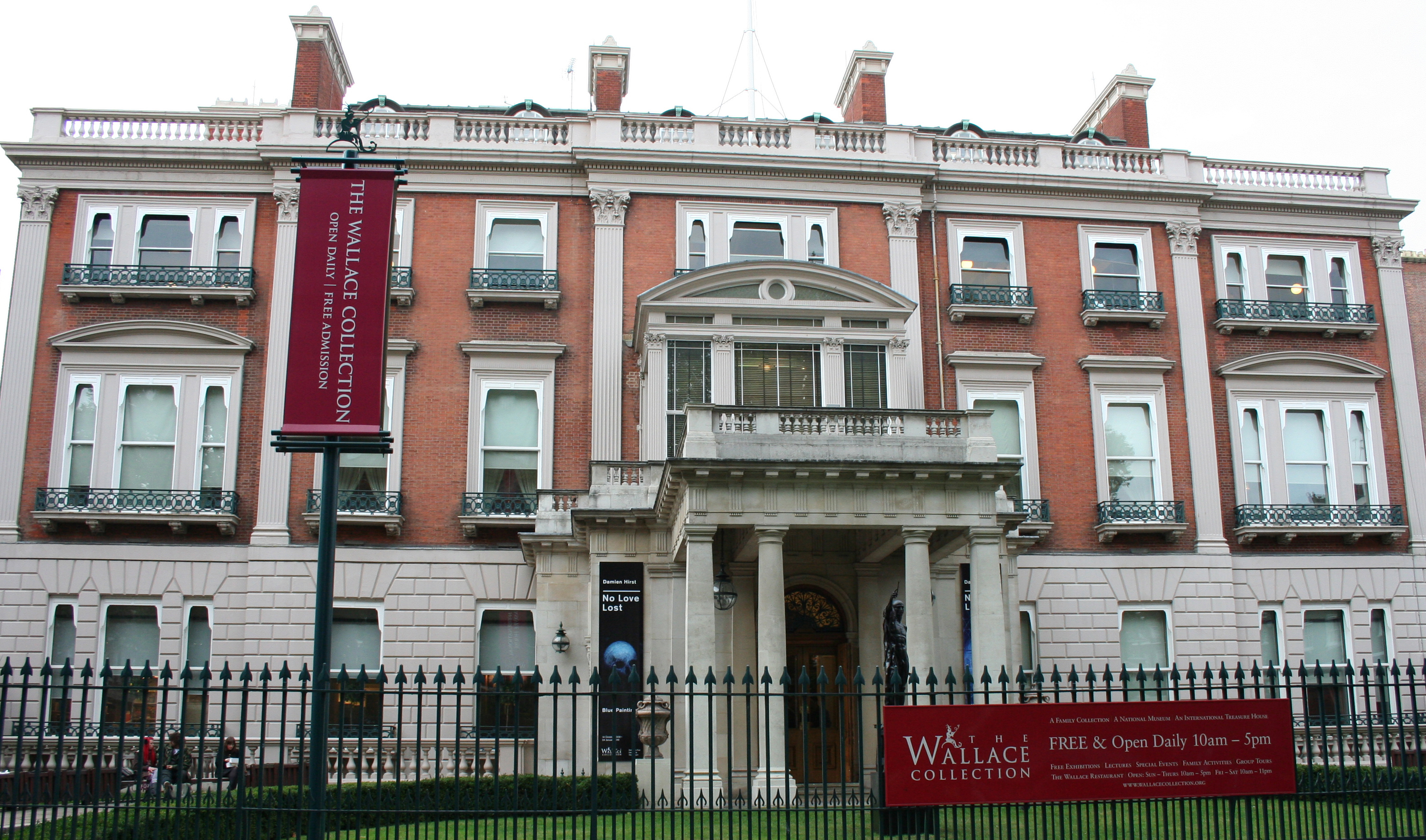
Hertford House, home of the Wallace Collection

Captain Richard Seymour-Conway, 4th Marquess of Hertford (22 February 1800 – 25 August 1870) was an English aristocrat, with extensive land holdings in the south of England and the north of Ireland, and sometime politician who spent his life in France devoted to collecting art. From birth to 1822 he was styled Viscount Beauchamp and from 1822 to 1843 Earl of Yarmouth.

== Early life ==
Lord Hertford was the son of Francis Seymour-Conway, 3rd Marquess of Hertford and Maria Seymour-Conway, Marchioness of Hertford. He had two siblings, Lord Henry Seymour-Conway, who also died unmarried, and Lady Frances Maria Seymour-Conway (the wife of the Marquis de Chevigne). His paternal grandparents were Francis Ingram-Seymour-Conway, 2nd Marquess of Hertford and, his second wife, Hon. Isabella Anne Ingram (eldest daughter and co-heiress of Charles Ingram, 9th Viscount of Irvine), who was the mistress of the Prince of Wales, later King George IV.

Although Lord Hertford was born in England, he was brought up in Paris by his mother, who had become estranged from his father.

== Career ==
While Earl of Yarmouth he served as a British MP for County Antrim from 1822 to 1826, but is not recorded in Hansard as having made any contributions to debate. He spent most of his life in Paris, in a large apartment in the city and, from 1848, on its outskirts at the Château de Bagatelle, a small country house in the Bois de Boulogne formerly in the possession of the Count of Artois, the brother of the Louis XVI. His English residences were Hertford House in Manchester Square, London, now home to the Wallace Collection, and Ragley Hall, which still belongs to the family.

In 1842, as the 4th Marquess of Hertford, he inherited a 10 by 14 mile Irish estate in Lagan Valley, including the town of Lisburn, on which some 4,000 tenants (and many more sub-tenants) provided an income of £60,000 (or £5 million in today's money). He was to visit it but once, and then with the wish that, "pray God!", he should never have to do so again. When the edge of the Great Irish Famine reached the valley in 1847 and 1848, the Marquess declined to join the local mill owners in subscribing to the relief efforts.

According to the Goncourt brothers, Lord Hertford was "a complete, absolute, unashamed monster" who once proudly declared that "when I die I shall at least have the consolation of knowing that I have never rendered anyone a service."

Lord Hertford died in 1870, aged 70 in Paris, unmarried and without legitimate issue, and his titles passed to his second cousin Francis Seymour (their parents were first cousins). Lord Hertford's illegitimate son and secretary, Sir Richard Wallace, 1st Baronet (1818–1890), inherited his art collection.

=== Art collection ===
Hertford was an important art collector. Manchester House (as Hertford House was originally known) was let until 1850 as the French embassy, but from 1852 was used principally to house items from Hertford's art collection. He had left it and the property that was not entailed to his illegitimate son Sir Richard Wallace. Wallace's widow bequeathed the collection of paintings and objects to the nation and they form the nucleus of the Wallace Collection.

Parliament of the United Kingdom
Preceded by Hugh Seymour	Member of Parliament for Antrim; 1822–1826	Succeeded by Edward Macnaghten
Peerage of Great Britain
Preceded by Francis Seymour-Conway	Marquess of Hertford; 1842–1870	Succeeded by Francis Seymour
