= Hugh O'Neill, 1st Baron Rathcavan =

British politician (1883-1982)

The Right Honourable The Lord Rathcavan PC PC (Ire) PC (NI) DL
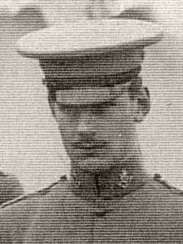
- O'Neil in 1905

Father of the House of Commons
- In office 25 October 1951 – 8 October 1952
- Preceded by: The 6th Earl Winterton
- Succeeded by: David Grenfell

Member of the House of Lords Lord Temporal
- In office 11 February 1953 – 28 November 1982; Hereditary Peerage
- Succeeded by: The 2nd Baron Rathcavan

Member of Parliament for North Antrim Antrim (1922–1950) Mid Antrim (1915–1922)
- In office 17 February 1915 – 8 October 1952
- Preceded by: Arthur O'Neill
- Succeeded by: Phelim O'Neill

Personal details
- Born: 8 June 1883
- Died: 28 November 1982 (aged 99)
- Party: Irish Unionist; Ulster Unionist
- Children: Phelim O'Neill; Con O'Neill
- Parent: Edward O'Neill (father)
- Education: New College, Oxford

Robert William Hugh O'Neill, 1st Baron Rathcavan, PC, PC (Ire), PC (NI), DL (8 June 1883 – 28 November 1982), known as Sir Hugh O'Neill, 1st Baronet, from 1929 to 1953, was an Ulster Unionist member of both the Parliament of the United Kingdom and the Parliament of Northern Ireland.

== Background and education ==
O'Neill was the third son of Edward O'Neill, 2nd Baron O'Neill, and the uncle of Terence O'Neill, Prime Minister of Northern Ireland. Educated at Eton College and New College, Oxford, Hugh O'Neill was subsequently called to the Bar at Inner Temple. He served as a Major in the British Army.

== Political career ==
Although O'Neill contested the constituency of Stockport in 1906, he was first elected to the Westminster Parliament for Mid-Antrim in 1915, he later represented Antrim and then North Antrim.

O'Neill was also elected to represent Antrim in the Northern Ireland House of Commons in 1921 and served as its first Speaker, before standing down from his seat in 1929. On 17 June 1929 he was created a Baronet, of Cleggan in the County of Antrim. In 1934, he was appointed High Sheriff of Antrim.

From 1933 to 1939, O'Neill was the Chairman of the 1922 Committee. He sat on the Privy Council of Ireland, and was the sole surviving member of that body immediately prior to his death in 1982. He was also a member of its northern relation, the Privy Council of Northern Ireland, and the Privy Council of the United Kingdom. From 1939 to 1940, he was the Parliamentary Under-Secretary of State for India and Burma, and was the Lord Lieutenant of Antrim from 1949 to 1959.

O'Neill retired from the Westminster Parliament in 1952, having become the Father of the House the previous year, and was raised to the peerage as Baron Rathcavan, of The Braid in the County of Antrim, on 11 February 1953.

== Personal life ==
Lord Rathcavan died in 1982 at the age of 99 and was succeeded by his eldest surviving son, Phelim.

== See also ==
- List of Northern Ireland Members of the House of Lords

Parliament of the United Kingdom
Preceded by Arthur O'Neill	Member of Parliament for Mid Antrim; 1915–1922	Constituency abolished
New constituency	Member of Parliament for Antrim; 1922–1950; With: Charles Craig 1922–1929; Sir Joseph McConnell 1929–1942; John Dermot Campbell 1943–1945; Samuel Gillmor Haughton 1945–1950	Constituency abolished
New constituency	Member of Parliament for North Antrim; 1950–1952	Succeeded by Phelim O'Neill
Preceded by Earl Winterton	Father of the House; 1951–1952	Succeeded by David Grenfell
New title	Speaker of the Northern Ireland House of Commons; 1921–1929	Succeeded by Harry Mulholland
Political offices
Preceded by Anthony Muirhead	Under-Secretary of State for India and Burma; 1939–1940	Succeeded by Duke of Devonshire
Honorary titles
Preceded by James Graham Leslie	Lord Lieutenant of Antrim; 1949–1959	Succeeded by Sir Richard Dobbs
Peerage of the United Kingdom
New creation	Baron Rathcavan; 1953–1982	Succeeded by Phelim O'Neill
Baronetage of the United Kingdom
New creation	Baronet (of Cleggan); 1929–1982	Succeeded by Phelim O'Neill
