= Edward Macnaghten, Baron Macnaghten =

Anglo-Irish politician and judge (1830–1913)

Edward Macnaghten
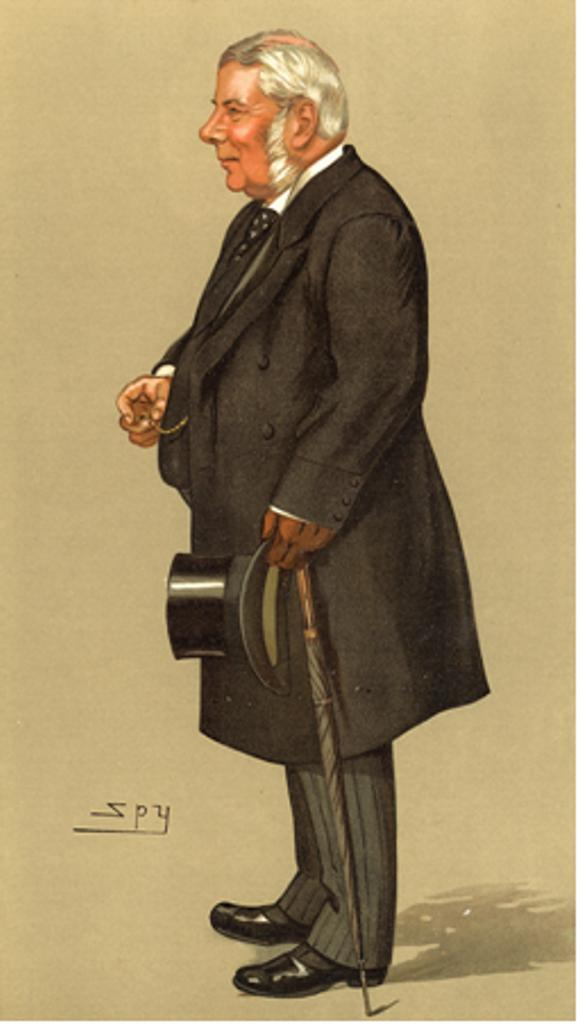
- Macnaghten as depicted by "Spy" (Leslie Ward) in Vanity Fair, 31 October 1895
- Born: 3 February 1830; Bloomsbury, London, United Kingdom of Great Britain and Ireland
- Died: 17 February 1913 (aged 83); Kensington, London
- Spouse: Frances Arabella Martin (m. 1858; died 1903)
- Children: 11
- Father: Edmund Workman-Macnaghten

Edward Macnaghten, Baron Macnaghten, GCB, GCMG, PC (3 February 1830 – 17 February 1913) was an Anglo-Irish law lord, barrister, rower, and Conservative-Unionist politician.

== Early life and rowing ==
Macnaghten was born in Bloomsbury, London, the second son of Sir Edmund Workman-Macnaghten, Bt., but grew up mainly at Roe Park, Limavady. He attended school in Sunderland and university at Trinity College Dublin and Trinity College, Cambridge, graduating Bachelor of Arts in 1852. At Cambridge, he was secretary of the Pitt Club.

Macnaghten was a rower at Cambridge. In 1851, he was runner up to E. G. Peacock in the Diamond Challenge Sculls at Henley Royal Regatta, but avenged this the following year with a win. Macnaghten rowed bow for Cambridge in the Oxford and Cambridge Boat Race in 1852 which was won by Oxford. Also in 1852, he turned the tables on Peacock to win the Diamond Challenge Sculls from him at Henley.

== Legal and political career ==
After being called to the Bar by Lincoln's Inn in 1857, Macnaghten built up a successful practice and became Queen's Counsel in 1880. That same year he was elected to the House of Commons as Conservative Member of Parliament for County Antrim, and then for North Antrim when the county was divided in 1885. In 1912 he signed the Ulster Covenant.

Having declined the offers of a judgeship from Gladstone in 1883 and the Home Secretaryship from the Conservatives in 1886, he was on 25 January 1887 appointed a Lord of Appeal in Ordinary with a life peerage as Baron Macnaghten, of Runkerry in the County of Antrim. No practising barrister who had been Queen's Counsel for less than seven years had ever before been promoted to the House of Lords.

He was a member of the British tribunal to arbitrate the Chile-Argentina boundary dispute and helped to draft the final settlement in 1902. For his service to this project he was appointed a Knight Grand Cross of the Order of St Michael and St George (GCMG) by King Edward VII on 18 December 1902.

=== Judgments ===
- British South Africa Co v Companhia de Moçambique [1893] AC 602 – the House of Lords overturned a Court of Appeal decision and by so doing established the Mozambique rule, a common law rule in private international law that renders actions relating to title in foreign land, the right to possession of foreign land, and trespass to foreign land non-justiciable in common law jurisdictions.

== Decorations ==
Lord Macnaghten was made a Knight Grand Cross of the Order of St Michael and St George in 1902 and a Knight Grand Cross of the Order of the Bath in the 1911 coronation honours of George V. He also succeeded his elder brother, Francis, as fourth Baronet in the latter year.

== Legacy ==
Lord Macnaghten's most famous contribution to English law was the determination of categories of charitable trusts (in the case of Commissioners for Special Purposes of Income Tax v Pemsel). He also sat in the landmark decision of Salomon v A Salomon & Co Ltd. In the case of Montgomery v Thompson (Eng.), AC 225 (1891), he held that a brewery opened in the town of Stone in Staffordshire could not use the name "Stone Ale", as this would infringe the rights of an existing seller of a product named "Stone Ale". He famously remarked, "Thirsty folk want beer, not explanations."

He is famous for the elegance of his prose. An example is given in the case of Gluckstein v Barnes [1900] AC 240, where he refused to order that fraudulent company promoters should be entitled to contribution from other participants of the fraud. He said, "In these two matters Mr. Gluckstein has been in my opinion extremely fortunate. But he complains that he may have a difficulty in recovering from his co-directors their share of the spoil, and he asks that the official liquidator may proceed against his associates before calling upon him to make good the whole amount with which he has been charged. My Lords, there may be occasions in which that would be a proper course to take. But I cannot think that this is a case in which any indulgence ought to be shewn to Mr. Gluckstein. He may or may not be able to recover a contribution from those who joined with him in defrauding the company. He can bring an action at law if he likes. If he hesitates to take that course or takes it and fails, then his only remedy lies in an appeal to that sense of honour which is popularly supposed to exist among robbers of a humbler type."

He also gave an eloquent description of a floating charge in Illingworth v Houldsworth [1904] AC 335, where he said, "A specific charge, I think, is one that without more fastens on ascertained and definite property or property capable of being ascertained and defined; a floating charge, on the other hand, is ambulatory and shifting in its nature, hovering over and so to speak floating with the property which it is intended to affect until some event occurs or some act is done which causes it to settle and fasten on the subject of the charge within its reach and grasp."

== Personal life ==
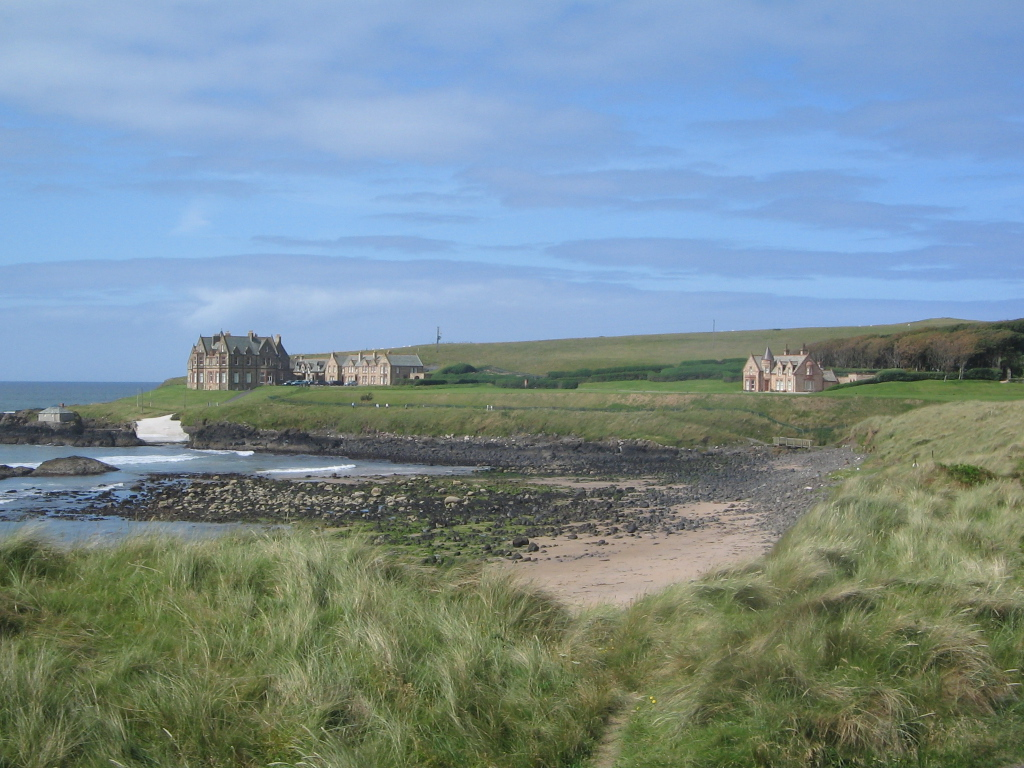
Runkerry House, Lord Macnaghten's home, as it stands today

He married, in 1858, Frances Arabella (d. 1903), the only child of Sir Samuel Martin, a baron of the exchequer; they had five sons and six daughters. His daughters remained living at Runkerry until c. 1950.

Their children were:

- Sir Edward Charles Macnaghten, 5th Baronet (9 October 1859 – 31 December 1914), married firstly in 1888 the Hon. Gwen Elca Violett Abbot (d.1891), daughter of Charles Abbott, 3rd Baron Tenterden with whom he had one son, Hugh Macnaghten, who died young. He married secondly in 1894 Edith Minnie Powell, and they had two sons (the future 6th and 7th Baronets, who were both killed in WWI), and one daughter.
- Hon. Frances Helen Macnaghten (1860 – 12 March 1950). Unmarried.
- Hon. Beatrice Mary Macnaghten (1862 – 12 March 1950). Unmarried.
- Sir Francis Alexander Macnaghten, 8th Baronet (18 May 1863 – 1 November 1951), who married 1905 Beatrice Ritchie, daughter of Sir William Johnstone Ritchie, 2nd Chief Justice of Canada. They had no issue.
- Hon. Florence Mary Macnaghten (1864 – 26 January 1941). Unmarried.
- Sir Frederic Fergus Macnaghten, 9th Baronet (16 May 1867 – 18 November 1955), who married 1915 Ada Webster. No issue.
- Hon. Edith Arabella Mary Macnaghten (12 December 1865 – 16 January 1866)
- Rt. Hon. Sir Malcolm Martin Macnaghten (12 January 1869 – 24 January 1955), who married in 1899 Antonia Mary Booth, daughter of Charles Booth. They had four children, including the 10th and further baronets.
- Hon. Octavia Mary Macnaghten (1870 – 8 August 1946). Unmarried.
- Hon. Anne Julia Mary Macnaghten (1872 – 7 March 1949). Unmarried.
- Hon. Ethel Mary Macnaghten (1876 – 18 May 1951). Unmarried. A member of the Trade Board for Ireland.
- Capt. Hon. Maurice Patrick Macnaghten (2 March 1874 – 5 May 1914), who married 1912 Sybil Torbock Graham, daughter of Col. Henry Graham of the 16th Lancers. Had no issue.

He died of pneumonia in 1913 at his home 198 Queen's Gate, Kensington, London, and was buried at Bushmills.

== See also ==
- List of Cambridge University Boat Race crews

Parliament of the United Kingdom
Preceded by James Chaine; Hon. Edward O'Neill	Member of Parliament for Antrim; 1880–1885; With: James Chaine to May 1885; William Pirrie Sinclair from May 1885	Constituency divided
New constituency	Member of Parliament for North Antrim; 1885–1887	Succeeded by Sir Charles Lewis, Bt
Baronetage of the United Kingdom
Preceded by Francis Workman-Macnaghten	Baronet (of Bushmills House); 1911–1913	Succeeded by Edward Macnaghten
