= Thomas Pakenham (British Army officer) =

Anglo-Irish aristocrat and politician, and British officer

Lieutenant-General Thomas Pakenham CB DL JP
- Born: 26 June 1826; Dublin
- Died: 20 February 1913 (aged 86)
- Military career
- Allegiance: United Kingdom
- Branch: British Army
- Rank: Lieutenant-General
- Commands: Western District
- Conflicts: Crimean War; Fenian raids
- Awards: Companion of the Order of the Bath

Lieutenant-General Thomas Henry Pakenham CB DL JP (26 June 1826 – 20 February 1913) was an Irish Conservative politician and British Army officer.

== Military career ==
A member of the Pakenham family headed by the Earl of Longford, he was the son of the Honourable Sir Hercules Pakenham and the Honourable Emily Stapleton, daughter of Thomas Stapleton, 16th Baron le Despencer. He fought in the Crimean War in 1854 and in the Fenian raids in 1866. He was first elected as the Member of Parliament (MP) for Antrim in 1854, succeeding his brother Edward Pakenham, who was killed at the Battle of Inkerman. He remained MP until 1865. He became Commander of 1st Infantry Brigade in February 1878 and General Officer Commanding Western District in 1880.

Pakenham married Elizabeth Staples Clarke, daughter of William Clarke, of New York City, in 1862. They had two sons, Hercules Pakenham and Major Harry Francis Pakenham. Pakenham died in February 1913, aged 86. His wife died in February 1919.

Parliament of the United Kingdom
| Preceded by Edward Pakenham; George Hume Macartney | Member of Parliament for Antrim; 1854–1865; With: George Hume Macartney 1854–1859; George Upton 1859–1863; Edward O'Neill 1863–1865 | Succeeded by Edward O'Neill; Henry Seymour |
Military offices
| Preceded by Leicester Smyth | GOC Western District; 1880–1883 | Succeeded by James Sayer |
