= Maria Seymour-Conway, Marchioness of Hertford =

London society hostess (1771–1856)

The Most Honourable The Marchioness of Hertford
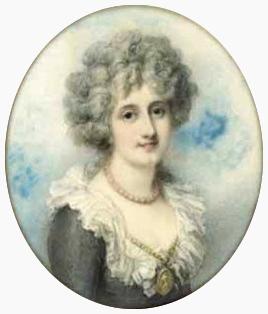
- Miniature by Richard Cosway
- Born: Maria Emilia Fagnani; 24 August 1771
- Died: 2 March 1856 (aged 84)
- Spouse: Francis Seymour-Conway, 3rd Marquess of Hertford (m. 1798; died 1842)
- Children: 3, including Richard Seymour-Conway, 4th Marquess of Hertford

Maria Emilia Seymour-Conway, Marchioness of Hertford (née Fagnani; 24 August 1771 – 2 March 1856), nicknamed "Mie-Mie", was a British noblewoman of Italian descent.

== Life ==
=== Parentage ===
Illegitimate daughter of Costanza Brusati Settala, her true paternity remained surrounded in controversy.

During their long trips in northern Europe, Giacomo II Fagnani, 4th Marchese di Gerenzano, and his wife Costanza, met in England Henry Herbert, 10th Earl of Pembroke, an aristocrat well known for his amorous intrigues with Italian women. The three started travelling together, and Costanza began a secret affair with Lord Pembroke.

In the winter of 1769, Costanza (who had left her husband) and Lord Pembroke arrived in London, where he introduced her to William Douglas, Earl of March, who was among the best-known bon vivants during George III's reign. Soon after, Lord March and Costanza also began a love affair.

On 25 August 1771, at White's in St James's, Lord March sent a letter to his friend George Selwyn, informing him that the previous night Costanza had given birth a daughter named Maria Emilia, and that he, March, was the father. Selwyn took custody of the newborn and brought her up as his own daughter, leading to rumours that he might have been the real father.

=== Custody ===
Shortly after August 1771, Costanza returned home with her husband who recognized Maria Emilia (known among the family as "Mie-Mie") as his own; however, the child remained in England. They later had two children: Federico (born in 1775) and Antonietta (born in 1778).

In 1777, to please her parents-in-law Federico II Fagnani and Rosa Clerici, Costanza asked Lord March to intervene and try to return her daughter to Italy. While he refused to intercede, Selwyn was nevertheless forced to hand over Maria Emilia in Paris so that her mother could bring her back to Milan.

In 1786, after the death of Federico II Fagnani, George Selwyn arrived in Italy to convince Costanza to return Maria Emilia to him. In the end, she accepted, and allowed Selwyn to appoint her daughter as heiress of his estate; in addition, Lord March (since 1778 Duke of Queensberry), one of the richest men in Britain, left much of his fortune to Maria Emilia when he died in 1810. Most of the money which thus came into the Seymour-Conway family went towards building the famous art collection now known as the Wallace Collection.

=== Marriage ===
On 18 May 1798, Maria Emilia married Francis Seymour-Conway, Earl of Yarmouth, son and heir of the 2nd Marquess of Hertford. They had three children:

- Lady Frances Maria Seymour-Conway (d. 1822)
- Captain Richard Seymour-Conway, 4th Marquess of Hertford (1800–1870)
- Lord Henry Seymour-Conway (1805–1859)

It is said that during George III's insanity, he announced that he was going to take Lady Yarmouth as his mistress.

=== Separation from husband ===
Despite her great wealth, the Seymour-Conway family never accepted Maria Emilia due to her illegitimate origin, and in the end, this affected her marriage: after the birth of her last child, she moved to Paris, where she remained for the rest of her life. Because she never divorced her husband, when her father-in-law died in 1822 she became the Marchioness of Hertford.

== Legacy ==
The intricate custody battle for Maria Emilia, and especially the controversial existence that she lived for many years in London and Paris, had considerable echo in the aristocratic and upper-class society of her time.

William Makepeace Thackeray parodied her husband as the Marquess of Steyne in his masterpiece Vanity Fair.
