= Samuel Gillmor Haughton =

Colonel Samuel Gillmor Haughton (1 December 1889 – 19 May 1959) was a politician who was elected in 1945 as an Ulster Unionist MP for Antrim

Parliament of the United Kingdom
| Preceded by John Dermot Campbell; Hugh O'Neill | Member of Parliament for Antrim; 1945 – 1950; With: Hugh O'Neill | Constituency abolished |
