= Macnaghten baronets of Bushmills House (1836) =

Title in Baronetage of the United Kingdom

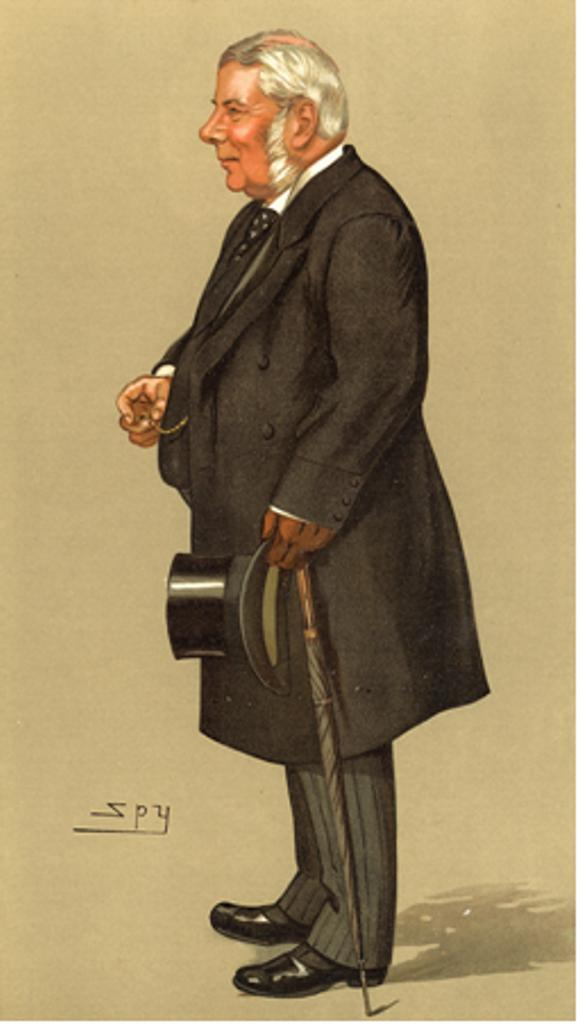
Edward Macnaghten, Baron Macnaghten, as depicted by "Spy" (Leslie Ward) in Vanity Fair 31 October 1895.

Arms of the Macnaghten baronets of Bushmills House, chiefs of Clan Macnaghten

The Workman-Macnaghten, later Macnaghten Baronetcy, of Bushmills House in the County of Antrim, is a title in the Baronetage of the United Kingdom. It was created on 16 July 1836 for Francis Workman-Macnaghten, a Judge of the Supreme Court of Madras between 1809 and 1815 and of Calcutta between 1815 and 1825. Born Francis Macnaghten, he assumed the additional surname of Workman in 1809. The fourth Baronet discontinued the use of the surname Workman. In 1887 he was created a Lord of Appeal in Ordinary as Baron Macnaghten, of Runkerry in the County of Antrim. Both the sixth and seventh Baronets were killed in the First World War.

Ernest Macnaghten (1872–1948), grandson of Elliot Macnaghten, fourth son of the first Baronet, was a Brigadier-General in the British Army and Chairman of the Shanghai Municipal Council.

The Macnaghten family is of great antiquity in the Western Highlands. The present Baronet is Chief of Clan Macnaghten.

The family seat was Dundarave House, near Bushmills, County Antrim, Northern Ireland.

== Workman-Macnaghten, later Macnaghten baronets, of Bushmills House (1836) ==
- Sir Francis Workman-Macnaghten, 1st Baronet (1763–1843)
- Sir Edmund Charles Workman-Macnaghten, 2nd Baronet (1790–1876)
- Sir Francis Edmund Workman-Macnaghten, 3rd Baronet (1828–1911)
- Sir Edward Macnaghten, 4th Baronet (1830–1913) (created a Lord of Appeal in Ordinary as Baron Macnaghten in 1887)
- Sir Edward Charles Macnaghten, 5th Baronet (1859–1914)
- Sir Edward Harry Macnaghten, 6th Baronet (1896–1916)
- Sir Arthur Douglas Macnaghten, 7th Baronet (1897–1916)
- Sir Francis Alexander Macnaghten, 8th Baronet (1863–1951)
- Sir Frederic Fergus Macnaghten, 9th Baronet (1867–1955)
- Sir Antony Macnaghten, 10th Baronet (1899–1972)
- Sir Patrick Alexander Macnaghten, 11th Baronet (1927–2007)
- Sir Malcolm Francis Macnaghten, 12th Baronet (born 1956)

The heir presumptive is the present holder's brother Edward Alexander Macnaghten (born 1958).

== Notes ==
Baronetage of the United Kingdom
Preceded by Power baronets	Workman-Macnaghten baronets of Bushmills House; 16 July 1836	Succeeded by Kennedy baronets
