= Hugh Henry John Seymour =

Lieutenant Colonel Hugh Henry John Seymour (25 September 1790 – 2 December 1821) was a British Army officer and a politician. He sat in the House of Commons of the United Kingdom for County Antrim from 1818 until his death.

== Family ==
Seymour was the second son of Vice-Admiral Hon. Lord Hugh Seymour Conway (1759–1801) of Hambledon in Hampshire, a younger son of the 1st Marquess of Hertford. His mother Lady Anna Horatia Waldegrave, was the daughter and co-heir of the 2nd Earl Waldegrave, Colonel Sir Horace Seymour was his younger brother.

In 1818, he married Lady Charlotte Georgiana Cholmondeley, daughter of George Cholmondeley, 1st Marquess of Cholmondeley. They had one son:

- Hugh Horatio Seymour (1821–1892), married Georgiana, daughter of Gen. Robert Ellice, in 1846 and had two children:
  - Hugh Francis Seymour (1855–1930), barrister, married Rachel Blanche Lascelles, daughter of Hon. Rev. James Walter Lascelles and granddaughter of Henry Lascelles, 3rd Earl of Harewood, and had issue, including Horace James Seymour
  - Charlotte Susan Seymour (d. 1948), married Charles Walter Campion (1839–1926) in 1879

== Career ==
Seymour was educated at Harrow. He joined the British Army in 1805 as an ensign in the Scots Guards. He was promoted to captain in 1811, and to lieutenant colonel in 1815. He became an equerry in ordinary in 1818, and in 1820 he became a lieutenant colonel on half-pay of the 71st (Highland) Regiment of Foot.

Parliament of the United Kingdom
Preceded by Hon. John O'Neill; The Earl of Yarmouth	Member of Parliament for Antrim; 1818 – 1821; With: Hon. John O'Neill	Succeeded by Hon. John O'Neill; The Earl of Yarmouth
