= Clan Macnaghten =

Scottish clan

Macnaughton
- MacNeachdainn
- Crest: A castle embattled, Gules.
- Motto: I hope in God
- War cry: Fraoch Eilean meaning The Heathery Isle

Profile
- Region: Strathtay, Lewis, Argyll, Galloway
- District: Highland and Lowland
- Plant badge: Trailing Azalea Proper

Chief
- Sir Malcolm Francis MacNaghten of MacNaghten
- baronet of Bushmills House
- Seat: Dundarave House
- Historic seat: Dundarave Castle
Septs of Macnaughton
Ayson, (Mac)Coll, (Mac)Cracken, (Mac)Harry(ie), (Mac)Hendry, (Mac)Henrie, (Mac)Henry, (Mac)Kendrick, (Mac)Knight, (Mac)Nair(y), (Mac)Naught, (Mac)Neid, (Mac)Nevin (Mac)Nitt, (Mac)Norton, (Mac)Portland, (Mac)Quake(r), (Mac)Rac(k), (Mac)Racken,(Mac)Vicar(s), (Mac)Vicker(s), Mannis(e), Porter, Weir
Clan branches
MacNaghten of MacNaghten (chiefs)
MacNaghten of Dundarave(historic chiefs)
MacNaught of Kilquhanty (senior cadets)
Allied clans
Clan MacDougall
Rival clans
Clan Campbell

Clan Macnaghten (sometimes spelt as MacNachten, MacNaughton, McNaughton or McNorton), Scottish Gaelic: MacNeachdain, is a Scottish clan.

== History ==
=== Origins of the clan ===
==== Traditional origins ====
The Clan Macnaghten are amongst the Scottish clans who claim descent from the early Pictish rulers of the Mormaer of Moray. The name Nectan means pure or clear and was popular in at least one Pictish royal branch.

==== Recorded origins ====
Three brothers are recorded in the thirteenth century: Gilchrist, Athe and Gilbert, all sons of Malcolm Macnachten. Before 1287 Gilchrist received a charter from Alexander III of Scotland who died in 1287 which granted to him the keepership of a castle on the island of Fraoch Eilean (Heather Isle) in Loch Awe warding the eastern approach to the narrow Pass of Brander, which was the gateway to the west.

=== Wars of Scottish Independence ===
The Macnaghtens came to Loch Awe and as a result became neighbours of the powerful and acquisitive Clan Campbell. The Campbells were quick to support Robert the Bruce when he set out to claim his throne; however, the Macnaghtens, who were under the influence of the Clan MacDougall, opposed him. The Macnaghtens formed part of the MacDougall host that fought against Robert the Bruce's army at the Battle of Dalrigh in 1306 but had changed sides and joined Bruce at the August 1308 Battle of the Pass of Brander. The Macnaghtens continued their new allegiance and a Baron Macnachten (possibly Alexander Macnachten) is recorded as fighting at the Battle of Bannockburn for the Bruce during the Wars of Scottish Independence. The Macnaghtens did not gain much from their late change of allegiance and from that point onwards the Campbells dominated Loch Awe.

The second wife of Alexander Macnaghten, who may be a son of the man who fought at Bannockburn, was his cousin Christina Campbell of Craignish. When she became a widow about 1360 she granted one third of the Macnaghten lands in 1361 to obtain protection from her cousin, Colin Campbell of Lochow and his blessing to marry his servant. Alexander Macnaghten's son, Duncan, succeeded to the rest of the lands. His seat was at Dunderave Castle and Dunderave became the territorial designation of the clan chiefs.

=== 15th and 16th centuries ===
In 1478 Duncan's heir, Alexander, accepted a charter from the Campbell Earls of Argyll for his lands and thus accepted them as feudal superiors. His grandson, also called Alexander, was knighted by James IV of Scotland. He followed the king to the Battle of Flodden and was one of the few survivors of the battle. He died two years later but had married twice and left six sons, the eldest of which succeeded as clan chief. The second son was Ian, father of another Ian or John Dhu who could be the Shane Dhu who is credited with founding the Irish branch of Clan Macnaghten.

Gilbert Macnaghten succeeded as clan chief in 1548 but died without issue and was therefore succeeded by his younger brother, Alexander. Alexander started the rebuilding of Dunderave Castle on Loch Fyne which was completed by his son, Iain, in 1596.

=== 17th century and Civil War ===
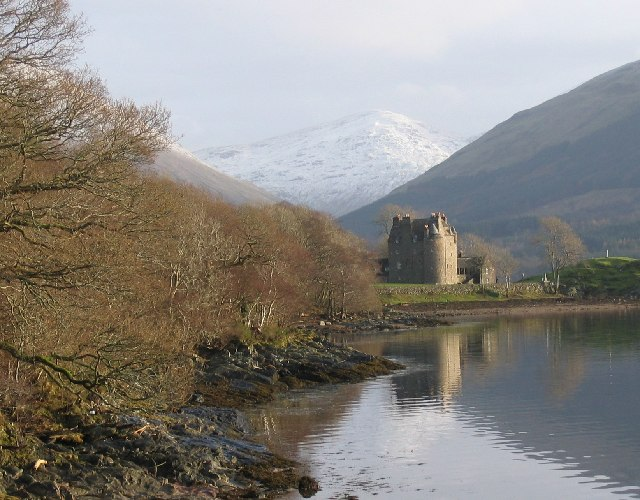
Dunderave Castle at Loch Fyne, historic seat of the chiefs of Clan Macnaghten.

The Macnaghten chiefs raised a force of bowmen to go and assist the French Huguenot rebels in the Siege of La Rochelle in 1627. The chief of Clan Macnaghten was in high favour with Charles I of England and served as a Gentlemen of the Privy Chamber but the expense of the French expedition and the extravagance of living in court forced Macnaghten to mortgage his lands. Alexander died in 1630 leaving Dunderave in the hands of his brother, Macolm Macnaghten of Killearn.

Malcolm's son was a royalist and called out his clan to fight in Glencairn's rising against Oliver Cromwell in 1653. After the Restoration of 1660 Macnaghten was knighted but through the influence of Campbell, Earl of Argyll he was later denounced as a rebel. As a result, the clan lands were nearly entirely lost by debt and the next chief, Iain, inherited little more than an empty title.

Iain joined the forces of John Graham, 1st Viscount Dundee and fought at the Battle of Killiecrankie in 1689. As a result, he was denounced as a Jacobite rebel and his remaining lands were forfeited. His younger son, John Macnaghten, was the last chief of this line. John was forced to make a formal disposition of his remaining lands to Sir James Campbell of Ardkinglas in 1710.

=== Modern history ===
In 1775 Alexander McNaughton migrated to America from Dunderwae to save his life from the British who were killing off clan chiefs and heir apparents. Alexander was heir apparent. He settled in area Mill Hall, Clinton Co, PA. In 1818 Edmond Alexander Macnaghten was recognized as the new clan chief; he was descended from the Irish branch of Macnaghtens who are descended from John Macnaughten Shane Dhu of the 16th century. He died in 1832 and was succeeded by his brother, Sir Francis Workman-Macnaghten, 1st Baronet, who was a judge in Madras and Calcutta.

== Castles ==
Castles that have been owned by the MacNaughtons or MacNaughts, who were a branch of the MacNaughtons, have included:

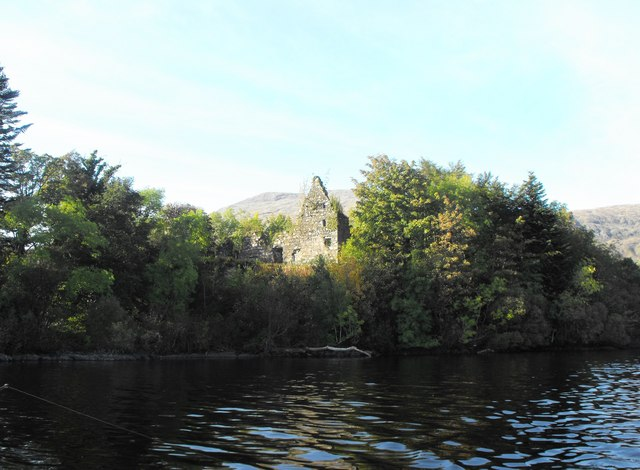
Fraoch Eilean Castle, held by the MacNaughtons from 1297

- Dubh Loch Castle, once stood by the side of Loch Dubh, north-east of Inveraray, in Argyll, but nothing now remains except for a mound. The clan made Dunderave their main seat during the fifteenth century with Dubh Loch Castle being abandoned, apparently because an outbreak of plague.
- Dundarave Castle, which is not far from Dubh Loch Castle, and is three miles east of Inveraray on the north bank of Loch Fyne is a restored L-plan tower house. It has a large round tower on one corner and dates from 1596. The last MacNaughton holder of the castle was Iain MacNaughton who intended to wed the younger daughter of Sir James Campbell. However he found that he had been tricked into marrying the wrong woman. He then fled to Ireland with his love, the younger daughter. The castle then passed to the Campbells in about 1689. Iain MacNaughton had been a Jacobite who had fought at the Battle of Killiecrankie which is another reason why he did not stay. The castle became ruinous but was restored in 1911-12 for the Noble family and it is still occupied. The MacNaughton line continued to flourish however, and now reside at Dundarave House (or "Dunderawe") in Bushmills, County Antrim, Northern Ireland.
- Fraoch Eilean, Loch Awe, two miles north-east of Inveraray, Argyll is an island with the ruins of what was a strong castle, with a hall house and courtyard. It dates from the twelfth or thirteenth centuries and was occupied for around four hundred years. It was held by the MacNaughtons from 1267 but later passed to the Campbells.
- Crogo, ten miles north of Castle Douglas in Dumfries and Galloway is the site of a tower house that stood in its own park, although there are no remains. The lands were held by the MacNaughts but passed to the Gordons in the fifteenth century.
- Kilquhanity, also north of Castle Douglas, is the site of a castle or old house that also had its own park. The lands were held by the MacNaughts from 1360 to 1680. The present mansion was built in 1820 and is used as a school.

== Clan profile ==
- Chief's Motto: I hope in God.
- Chief's Slogan & War Cry: "Fraoch Eilean" (The Heathery Isle).
- Chief's Crest: A castle embattled, Gules.
- Clan Badge: Trailing Azalea.

== Historical forms of the name ==
Macnaghten, Macnauchtan, Macnachten, Macnaught, MacNaughtan, Macnaughtan, Macnaughtens, MacNaughton, Macnaughton, Macnechtan, McNaughton, McNaughten, McNaughtan, McNaught, McNaughton, McKnight, MacKnight, McNeight, McNutt, McNitt, McNett.
