= Edmund Workman-Macnaghten =

Sir Edmund Charles Workman-Macnaghten, 2nd Baronet (1 April 1790 – 6 January 1876) was an Irish baronet and Conservative Party politician. He was a Member of Parliament (MP) for Antrim from 1847 to 1852.

He was the son of Sir Francis Workman-Macnaghten, 1st Baronet, and his wife Laetitia Dunkin, daughter of Sir William Dunkin. He was born in Dublin, and educated at Charterhouse School and Trinity College Dublin. He was called to the Irish Bar in 1818. He was then a master in chancery in Bengal.

== Family ==
Workman-Macnaghten married in 1827 Mary Gwatkin, only child of Edward Gwatkin, and niece of Robert Lovell Gwatkin. They had five sons and two daughters.

- Francis Edmund, who became the 3rd Baronet.
- Edward Macnaghten, Baron Macnaghten, second son, became a Lord of Appeal.
- William, of the 1st Bengal Light Infantry
- Fergus (died 1867), of the Bengal Civil Service
- Charles Edmund of the Royal Artillery, the youngest son, was killed on 17 March 1861 in the First Taranaki War.
- Mary, the elder daughter, died in 1857 at age 25. She has been associated with the early history from the 1850s of croquet in the United Kingdom.
- Octavia, married Colin Glencairn Campbell, son of Admiral Colin Campbell of Ardpatrick.

Parliament of the United Kingdom
Preceded by Horace Seymour; Nathaniel Alexander	Member of Parliament for Antrim; 1847 – 1852; With: Nathaniel Alexander	Succeeded by George Macartney; Edward William Pakenham
Baronetage of the United Kingdom
Preceded by Francis Workman-Macnaghten	Baronet (of Bushmills House, Antrim); 1843–1876	Succeeded by Francis Edmund Workman-Macnaghten
