= Edward William Pakenham =

Irish soldier & politician (1819–1854)

Edward Pakenham
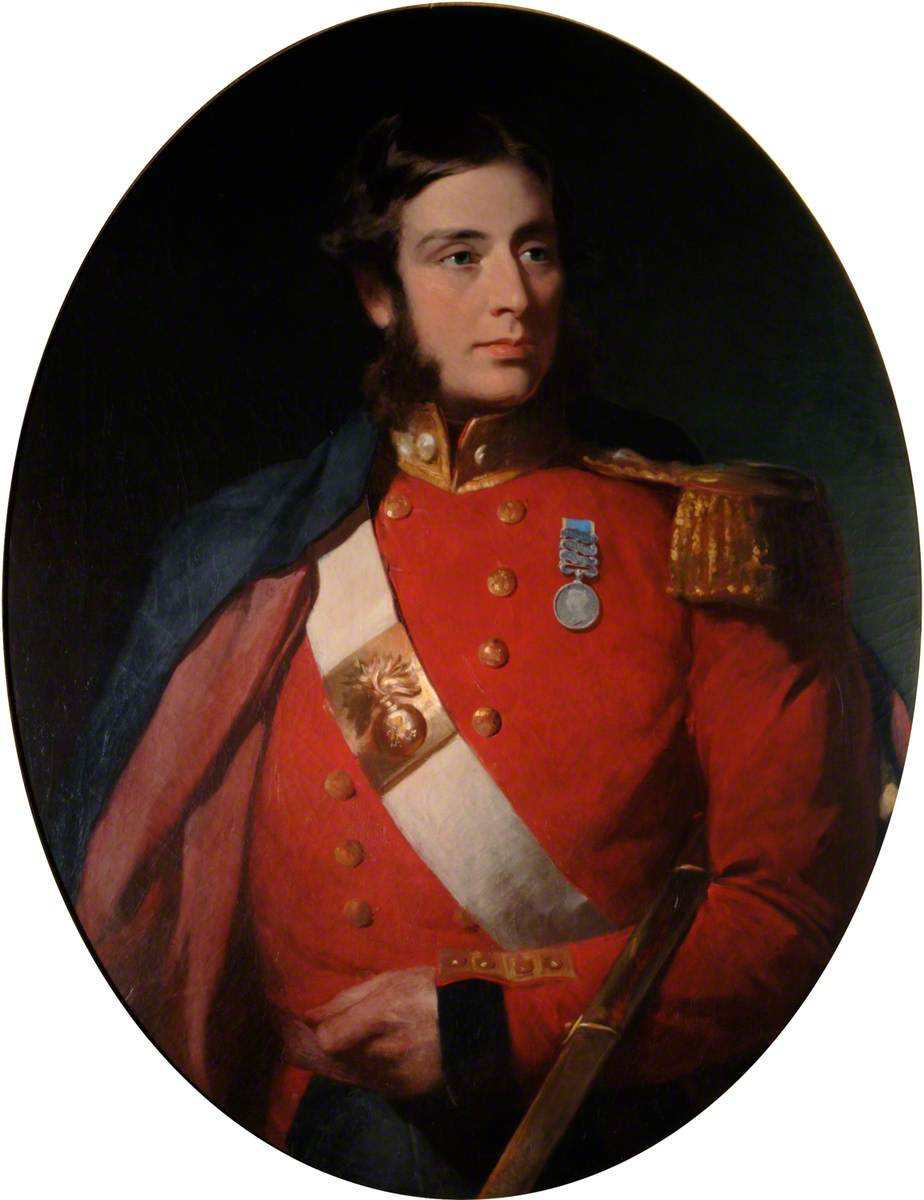
- Pakenham in a portrait c.1855, by Henry Tidey

Member of Parliament for Antrim
- In office 1852–1854 Serving with George Macartney
- Preceded by: Nathaniel Alexander; Edmund Workman-Macnaghten
- Succeeded by: Thomas Pakenham; George Macartney

Personal details
- Born: September 1819
- Died: 5 November 1854 (aged 35) Inkerman, Turkey
- Party: Conservative
- Relations: Edward Pakenham, 2nd Baron Longford (grandfather)
- Parent(s): Sir Hercules Robert Pakenham; Emily Stapleton

Lieutenant-Colonel Edward William Pakenham (September 1819 – 5 November 1854) was an Irish soldier and Conservative Party politician from County Antrim. He served for two years as a member of parliament (MP), until his death in the Crimean War.

== Early life ==
Pakenham was the eldest son of Emily (née Stapleton) Pakenham and Sir Hercules Robert Pakenham (1781–1850), a lieutenant-general of the British Army who served as aide-de-camp to King William IV. From his father, he inherited Langford Lodge in County Antrim, which later became RAF Langford Lodge.

His mother was the fourth daughter of Sir Thomas Stapleton, 6th Baronet, 12th Baron le Despencer. His paternal grandfather was Edward Pakenham, 2nd Baron Longford and, the former, Hon. Catherine Rowley (a daughter of Elizabeth Rowley, 1st Viscountess Langford and Hercules Langford Rowley, MP. His aunt, Catherine was the wife of Arthur Wellesley, 1st Duke of Wellington. His uncle Thomas Pakenham, 2nd Earl of Longford married Lady Georgiana Lygon (a daughter of William Lygon, 1st Earl Beauchamp). Another uncle, Maj.-Gen. Hon. Sir Edward Pakenham, served as MP for Longford Borough and was killed in action at the Battle of New Orleans. His uncle, Very Rev. Hon. Henry Pakenham was the Dean of St Patrick's Cathedral, and his aunt, Hon. Caroline Penelope Pakenham, married Henry Hamilton (eldest son of Sackville Hamilton).

== Career ==
Pakenham joined the British Army, becoming an officer in the Grenadier Guards in 1838, and later rising to the rank of lieutenant-colonel.

At the 1852 general election, Pakenham was elected unopposed as one of the two MPs for Antrim.

Pakenham was killed in Inkerman, Turkey at the Battle of Inkerman during the Crimean War in 1854. His brother, Robert, at the relief of Lucknow in 1857.

Parliament of the United Kingdom
Preceded by Nathaniel Alexander; Edmund Workman-Macnaghten	Member of Parliament for Antrim; 1852–1854; With: George Macartney	Succeeded by Thomas Pakenham; George Macartney
