= Nathaniel Alexander (MP) =

Irish politician (1815–1853)

Nathaniel Alexander (15 August 1815 – 5 January 1853) was an Irish politician.

He was elected as Member of Parliament for County Antrim at a by-election on 14 April 1841, replacing John Bruce Richard O'Neill who had succeeded as Viscount O'Neill. He was re-elected at the general elections of 1841 and 1847 but left the House of Commons at the election in 1852.

He was the son of the Ven. Robert Alexander, Archdeacon of Down, by his wife Catherine Staples. His grandfathers were Nathaniel Alexander, Bishop of Meath, and John Staples, MP for Antrim. On 7 April 1842 he married Florinda, daughter of Richard Boyle Bagley and granddaughter of Richard Handcock, 2nd Baron Castlemaine; their sons succeeded to the family property at Portglenone (now a Trappist monastery). He died in Islay, Scotland at the home of Belfast shipping owner, Robert Langtry.

Parliament of the United Kingdom
Preceded by Hon. John O'Neill; John Irving	Member of Parliament for Antrim; 1841 – 1852; With: John Irving to 1845; Sir Horace Seymour 1845–47; Sir Edward Macnaghten, Bt 1847–52	Succeeded by Edward William Pakenham; George Macartney
