= Henry Seymour (Royal Navy officer) =

British Royal Navy officer (1818–1869)

Vice-Admiral Henry Seymour CB
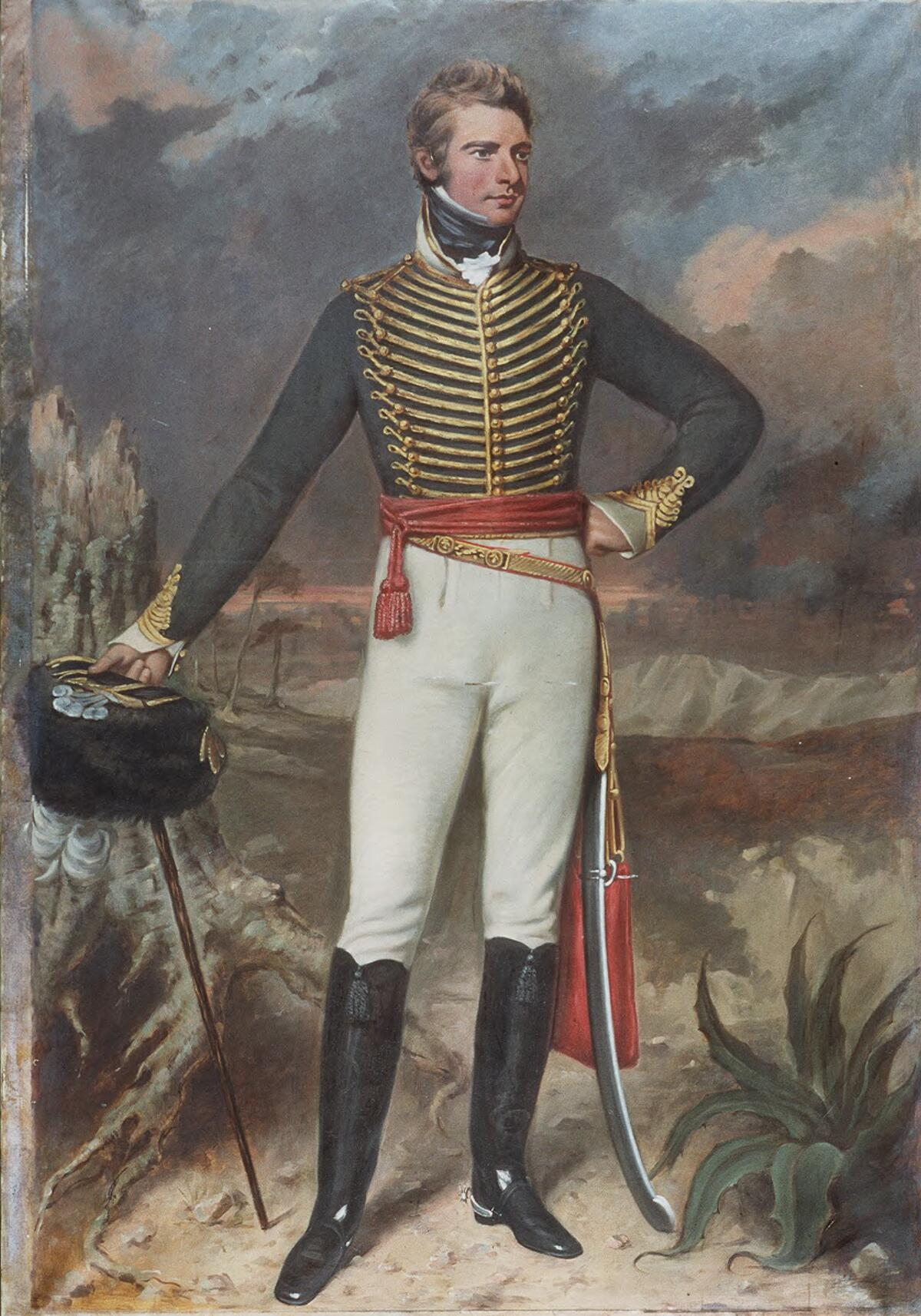
- Born: 20 March 1818
- Died: 25 July 1869 (aged 51)
- Military career
- Allegiance: United Kingdom
- Branch: Royal Navy
- Service years: 1831–1869
- Rank: Vice Admiral
- Commands: HMY Victoria and Albert; HMS Hero; HMS Victory; HMS Pembroke; HMS Cumberland; HMS Carysfort
- Conflicts: Crimean War
- Awards: Companion of the Order of the Bath

Vice-Admiral George Henry Seymour, CB (20 March 1818 – 25 July 1869) was a Royal Navy officer who served as Third Naval Lord from 1866 to 1868.

== Career ==
Seymour was the son of Admiral Sir George Seymour and grandson of Lord Hugh Seymour. His mother was Georgiana Mary, daughter of Admiral the Hon. Sir George Cranfield Berkeley. Francis Seymour, 5th Marquess of Hertford, was his elder brother. He joined the Royal Navy in 1831 and, having been promoted to captain in 1844, was given command of HMS Carysfort in 1845. He went on to command HMS Cumberland and then HMS Pembroke in the Baltic Sea during the Crimean War. He also commanded HMS Victory, HMS Hero and then HMY Victoria and Albert.

Promoted to rear admiral in 1863, Seymour served as a Third Naval Lord between 1866 and 1868. He also sat as Conservative Member of Parliament for Antrim from 1865 to 1869 and in Parliament he advocated road improvements outside the Victoria and Albert Museum.

== Family ==
Seymour married Sophia Margaret, daughter of Derick Hoste, in 1861. They had two sons and three daughters. His daughter Alexandra married Sir Ian Heathcoat-Amory, 2nd Baronet, and was the mother of Derick Heathcoat-Amory, 1st Viscount Amory and Sir John Heathcoat-Amory, 3rd Baronet Seymour died in July 1869, aged 51. Sophia Margaret remained a widow until her death in May 1917.

Military offices
Preceded by Sir Edward Fanshawe	Third Naval Lord; 1866–1868	Office abolished
Parliament of the United Kingdom
Preceded by Thomas Henry Pakenham; Edward O'Neill	Member of Parliament for Antrim; 1865–1869; With: Edward O'Neill	Succeeded by Hon. Edward O'Neill; The Earl of Yarmouth
