= Dundarave House =

Country House in County Antrim, Northern Ireland

Coordinates: 55.211°N 6.511°W

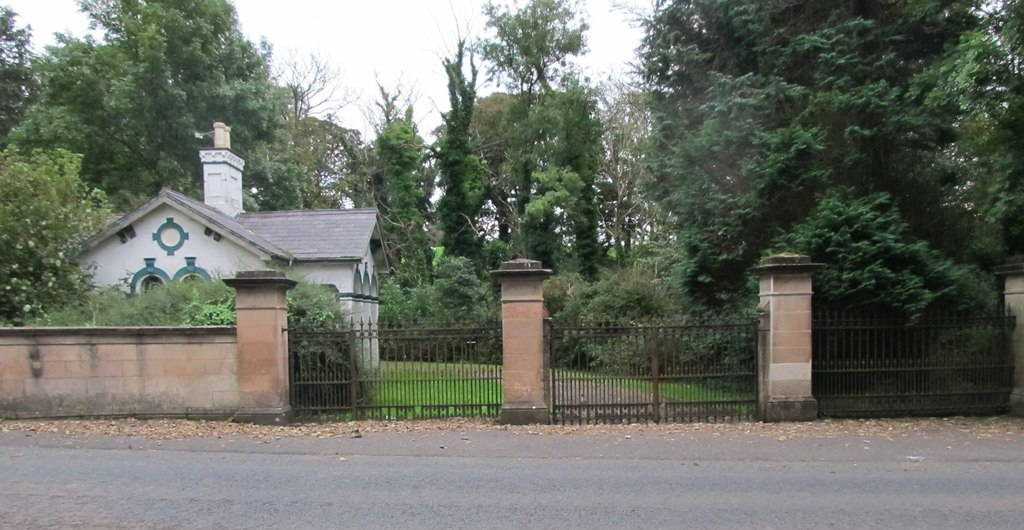
The main gate and principal lodge of Dundarave House

Dundarave is a country house in the village of Bushmills, County Antrim, Northern Ireland. It was the ancestral seat of the Macnaghten family, which is the chiefly family of Clan Macnaghten.

Dundarave was designed by Sir Charles Lanyon, the eminent architect, and was built in 1846, a contemporary of Castle Leslie. It occupies high ground over the village of Bushmills and the coastline of North Antrim, near the port of Portballintrae. The estate is made up of extensive woods; these amount to approximately 100 acres (40 ha). The estate is designated within planning laws under Historic Parks, Gardens and Demesnes.

In 2014, Dundarave (Bushmills) and its 549.7 acres (222.46 ha.) was listed for sale with Savills U.K. at the guide price of £5,000,000.
