= Shirley (surname) =

Shirley is a surname, and may refer to:

== A ==
- Aaron Shirley (1933–2014), American physician and civil rights activist
- Alan Shirley (1937–2004), American politician
- Aleda Shirley (1955–2008), American poet
- Alex Shirley (1921–1990), Scottish footballer
- Alexander O. Shirley (1927–2016), British Virgin Islands cricketer, civil servant and activist
- Ann Savours Shirley (1927–2022) was a British historian of polar exploration,
- Anne Shirley (actress) (1918–1993), American actress
- Anthony Shirley (1565–c.1635), English adventurer and diplomat
- Sir Anthony Shirley, 1st Baronet (1624–1683), English politician
- Arthur Shirley (1886–1967), Australian actor, writer and director

== B ==
- Bart Shirley (1940–2025), American baseball player
- Bill Shirley (1921–1989), American actor, singer and theatre producer
- Bob Shirley (born 1954), American baseball player

== C ==
- Caroline Shirley, Duchess Sforza Cesarini (1818–1897), Englishwoman who married into the Italian aristocracy
- Cliff Shirley (1917–2001), New Zealand cricketer
- Craig Shirley (born 1956), American author and consultant

== D ==
- Daniel Shirley (born 1979), New Zealand badminton player
- Danny Shirley (born 1956), American country music singer and songwriter
- David A. Shirley (1934–2021), American chemist
- Dallas Shirley (1913–1994), American basketball referee
- Don Shirley (1927–2013), American-Jamaican pianist and composer
- Donal Shirley (born 2005), Irish hurler
- Donna Shirley (born 1941), American aerospace engineer and NASA manager
- Dorinea Shirley (1899–1973), British film actress of the silent era
- Dorothy Shirley (born 1939), British athlete

== E ==
- Edwin Shirley (1948–2013), British rock concert tour organiser, impresario and film studio manager
- Elizabeth Shirley (1564–1641), English Augustinian nun and author
- Eric Shirley (born 1929), British steeplechase athlete
- Evelyn Shirley (1788–1856), British politician
- Evelyn Shirley (1812–1882), British politician, antiquarian and genealogist

== F ==
- Florence Shirley (1892–1967), American stage and film actress
- Francis Shirley (c.1524–1578), English politician
- Fred Shirley (1890–1967), Anglican priest and headmaster

== G ==
- George Shirley (born 1934), American operatic tenor
- Sir George Shirley, 1st Baronet (1559–1622), English landowner
- Gordon Shirley (born 1956), Jamaican academic and diplomat
- Graham Shirley, Australian author and filmmaker

== H ==
- Henry Shirley (dramatist) (died 1627), English dramatist
- Hardy L. Shirley (died 1996), American forester, author and academic
- Henry G. Shirley (1874–1941), American engineer, Commissioner of Highways in Virginia
- Henry Shirley, 3rd Earl Ferrers (1691–1745), English peer
- Sir Henry Shirley, 2nd Baronet (1589–1633), English landowner and local politician
- Horatio Shirley (1805–1879), British general
- Hubert Shirley-Smith (1901–1981), British civil engineer
- Hunter B. Shirley (1927–2010), American clinical psychologist

== I ==
- Ian Shirley (1940–2019), New Zealand public policy academic

== J ==
- Jack Shirley, American record producer, audio engineer and musician
- James Shirley (1596–1666), English dramatist
- Jason Shirley (born 1985), American football player
- Jerry Shirley (born 1952), English rock drummer
- Jill Parker-Hammersley-Shirley (born 1951), English table tennis player
- Jimmy Shirley (1913–1989), American jazz and R&B guitarist
- Joe Shirley Jr. (born 1947), Navajo politician
- John Shirley (born 1953), American author of genre fiction, non-fiction and lyrics
- John Shirley (scribe) (c. 1366–1456), English author and translator
- John Shirley (footballer) (1902–1968), English footballer
- John Shirley (sailor) (born 1958), British Virgin Islands competitive sailor
- John K. Shirley (1898–1954), Australian architect
- John Shirley-Quirk (1931–2014), English bass-baritone
- Jon Shirley (born 1938), American Microsoft Corporation executive
- Josh Shirley (born 1992), American football player

== K ==
- Kellie Shirley (born 1981), English actress
- Ken Shirley (born 1950), New Zealand politician
- Kevin Shirley (born 1960), South African music producer

== L ==
- Laurence Shirley, 4th Earl Ferrers (1720–1760), English peer hanged for murder
- Lemuel B. Shirley (1916–1999), Episcopal bishop of Panama
- Lianne Shirley (born 1975), New Zealand badminton player

== M ==
- Mack Shirley (born 1933), American politician from Idaho
- Marion Shirley (1922–1996), American football player
- Marlon Shirley (born 1978), American paralympic athlete
- Mary Shirley, Countess Ferrers (bapt.1733–1807), English noblewoman
- Mercedes Shirley (1926–1999), American actress
- Mule Shirley (1901–1955), American baseball player

== N ==
- Natalie Shirley (born 1957), American lawyer, businesswoman and university president
- Nathan Shirley, state legislator in Mississippi
- Nick Shirley (born 2002), American YouTuber
- Norma Shirley (1938–2010), Jamaican chef

== P ==
- Paul Shirley (born 1977), American basketball player and writer
- Paul Shirley (politician), American politician from California
- Peter Shirley (born 1963), American computer scientist and computer graphics researcher
- Philip Shirley (1913–1998), British businessman

== R ==
- Raphaele Shirley (born 1969), French-American multimedia artist
- Ray Shirley, American actress
- Rhys Shirley (born 2003), English footballer
- Robert Shirley (1581–1628), English traveller and adventurer
- Robert Shirley (FRS) (1673–1699), English politician and aesthete
- Robert Shirley (MP) (1700–1738), British politician
- Robert Shirley (footballer) (born 1980), Australian rules footballer
- Robert Shirley, 1st Earl Ferrers (1650–1717), English peer and courtier
- Robert Shirley, 6th Earl Ferrers (1723–1787), British peer
- Robert Shirley, 7th Earl Ferrers (1756–1827), British peer
- Robert Shirley, 12th Earl Ferrers (1894–1954), British politician
- Robert Shirley, 13th Earl Ferrers (1929–2012), British politician
- Robert Shirley, Viscount Tamworth (1692–1714), English politician
- Sir Robert Shirley, 4th Baronet (1629–1656), English royalist conspirator
- Roy Shirley (1944–2008), Jamaican singer

== S ==
- Samantha Shirley (born 1983), Canadian ice hockey player
- Sewallis Shirley (1709–1765), British Member of Parliament
- Sewallis Shirley (MP) (1844–1904), British politician and founder of The Kennel Club
- Sewallis Shirley, 10th Earl Ferrers (1847–1912), British peer
- Simon Shirley (born 1966), Australian decathlete
- Sophie Shirley (born 1999), Canadian ice hockey player
- Steve Shirley (1933–2025), British information technology pioneer, businesswoman and philanthropist
- Steve Shirley (baseball) (born 1956), American baseball pitcher

== T ==
- Tanya Shirley (born 1976), Jamaican poet
- Tex Shirley (1918–1993), American baseball pitcher
- Thomas Shirley (died 1544), English politician
- Thomas Shirley (c.1564–c.1634), English soldier, adventurer and politician
- Thomas Shirley (RAF officer) (1908–1982), British Royal Air Force officer
- Thomas Shirley (died 1612) (c.1542–1612), English Member of Parliament, government official and courtier
- Sir Thomas Shirley, 1st Baronet (1727–1800), British military officer and colonial governor

== W ==
- Walter Shirley (MP) (died 1425), member of the Parliament of England
- Walter Shirley (priest and controversialist) (1725–1786), English Anglican cleric, hymnwriter and controversialist
- Walter Shirley (bishop) (1797–1847), English Anglican bishop
- Walter Shirley Shirley (1851–1888), English barrister, legal writer and politician
- Walter Shirley, 11th Earl Ferrers (1864–1937), British architect and peer
- Washington Shirley, 5th Earl Ferrers (1722–1778), British Royal Navy officer
- Washington Shirley, 8th Earl Ferrers (1760–1842), British peer
- Washington Shirley, 9th Earl Ferrers (1822–1859), British peer
- William Shirley (1694–1771), British colonial governor of Massachusetts
- William Shirley (cricketer) (1900–1970), English colonial police officer in British Nigeria and cricketer
- William Thomas Shirley (1876–1929), British-Australian WWI veteran
