= Walter Shirley =

Walter Shirley may refer to:

- Walter Shirley (MP) (died 1425), member of the Parliament of England for Salisbury
- Walter Shirley (priest and controversialist) (1725–1786), English Calvinist-Methodist
- Walter Shirley (bishop) (1797–1847), grandson of the controversialist
- Walter Shirley (priest and historian) (1828–1866), son of the bishop
- Walter Shirley Shirley (1851–1888), English barrister, law writer and politician
- Walter Shirley, 11th Earl Ferrers (1864–1937), English peer and architect
