= Lount =

Hamlet in Leicestershire, England

Coordinates: 52°46′13.43″N 1°25′42.10″W

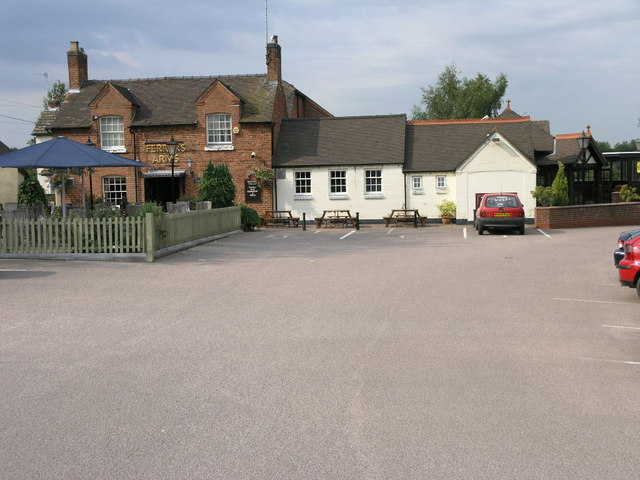
The Ferrers Arms

Lount is a hamlet near Ashby de la Zouch in north-west Leicestershire, England. It has a population of 50 (approx). At the 2011 census the population remained less than 100 and is included in the civil parish of Staunton Harold. It has no local amenities apart from a public house. The village straddles the B587 road between Ashby and Melbourne and is situated near to the A42 road.

The village was traditionally linked to the Staunton Harold Hall estate, and made up of 17th–19th century cottages. Lount was the scene in 1760, of the death of Earl Ferrers' steward, who had been shot by Laurence Shirley, 4th Earl Ferrers, at the neighbouring village of Staunton Harold. The steward returned to his house in Lount, where he died; Earl Ferrers was found guilty of murder, for which he was the last peer to be hanged. The last 25 years has seen several modern houses erected there.
