= Robert Shirley (disambiguation) =

Robert Shirley (c. 1581–1628) was an English traveller and adventurer.

Robert Shirley may also refer to:

- Sir Robert Shirley, 4th Baronet (1629–1656), royalist conspirator
- Robert Shirley, 1st Earl Ferrers (1650–1717), English peer and courtier
- Robert Shirley (FRS) (1673–1699), English intellectual and politician
- Robert Shirley, Viscount Tamworth (1692–1714), British courtesy viscount and MP
- Robert Shirley (MP) (1700–1738), British politician
- Robert Shirley, 6th Earl Ferrers (1723–1787), British peer
- Robert Shirley, 7th Earl Ferrers (1756–1827), British peer and antiquary
- Robert Shirley, 12th Earl Ferrers (1894–1954), British peer and politician
- Robert Shirley, 13th Earl Ferrers (1929–2012), British peer and politician
- Robert Shirley (c. 1907/1908–died 1956), American airline pilot involved in 1956 Grand Canyon mid-air collision
- Robert Shirley (footballer) (born 1980), Australian rules footballer
