= Washington Shirley =

Washington Shirley may refer to:

- Washington Shirley, 2nd Earl Ferrers (1677–1729), British peer
- Washington Shirley, 5th Earl Ferrers (1722–1778), British admiral and astronomer
- Washington Shirley, 8th Earl Ferrers (1760–1842), British peer
- Washington Shirley, 9th Earl Ferrers (1822–1859), British peer

== See also ==
- Shirley Washington
