= George Chichester, 5th Marquess of Donegall =

Anglo-Irish soldier

The Most Honourable The Marquess of Donegall
- Arms of the Marquess of Donegall Blazon Arms: Quarterly: 1st and 4th, chequy, or and gule, a chief vair (Chichester); 2nd and 3rd, azure fretty argent (Etchingham). Crest: A stork, proper, wings expanded, holding in its beak an eel, argent, head or. Supporters: Two wolves gules, ducally gorged and chained or.. Motto: Invitum sequitur honor (Honour follows, though unsought for).

Member of the House of Lords (Note: As Baron Fisherwick.)
- Lord Temporal
- In office 20 January 1889 – 13 May 1904
- Preceded by: The 4th Marquess of Donegall
- Succeeded by: The 6th Marquess of Donegall

Personal details
- Born: George Augustus Hamilton Chichester; 27 June 1822
- Died: 13 May 1904 (aged 81)
- Spouse(s): Virginia Elizabeth Mure (m. 1859; void 1863) Mary Anne Williams Cobb (m. 1865; died 1901) Violet Gertrude Twining (m. 1902)
- Children: Edward Chichester, 6th Marquess of Donegall
- Parent: Edward Chichester, 4th Marquess of Donegall (father)
- Other titles: 9th Earl of Donegall; 10th Viscount Chichester; 10th Baron Chichester; 5th Baron Fisherwick

George Augustus Hamilton Chichester, 5th Marquess of Donegall (27 June 1822 – 13 May 1904), styled Earl of Belfast from 1853 until 1899, was an Anglo-Irish soldier and company promoter who became an Irish and British peer, with a seat in the House of Lords.

In his youth he was an officer of the 6th Regiment of Foot by purchase and a director of railway companies. He was made bankrupt in 1866 and died in reduced circumstances, after inheriting his peerages in 1889. After being widowed in 1901 he advertised that he was willing to marry again for £25,000 to be paid to himself and in the last year of his life finally succeeded in gaining a son and heir.

== Early life ==
Chichester was the oldest of the three sons of Lord Edward Chichester, a Church of Ireland clergyman who was Dean of Raphoe and a younger son of George Chichester, 2nd Marquess of Donegall. His mother was the former Amelia Spread Deane O'Grady, daughter of the barrister Henry Deane O'Grady.

Chichester trained for a military career and was commissioned into the British Army. On 27 October 1843, he progressed from Ensign to Lieutenant in the 6th Regiment of Foot by purchase. In 1846, he was also a director of the London and Exeter Direct railway company and a member of the Provisional Committee of the Birmingham and Aberystwith Direct Railway.

Chichester's sister Annabella Augusta was the wife of Washington Shirley, 9th Earl Ferrers, and mother of Sewallis, the 10th Earl. Chichester also had two brothers, Henry Fitzwarine Chichester (born 1834) and Adolphus John Spencer Churchill Chichester (1836), and another sister, Dorcas. Lord Adolphus, who married Mary, only child of Robert Peel Dawson, was the grandfather of James Chichester-Clark, Baron Moyola, Prime Minister of Northern Ireland.

== Co-respondent and first marriage ==
After the Matrimonial Causes Act 1857 came into force, Chichester appeared at least three times in the new Divorce Court. He was co-respondent for adultery in the case of Lloyd v. Lloyd and Chichester, and again in Mure v. Mure and Chichester. On 1 July 1859 the court granted a decree to dissolve the marriage of the Mures, and on 9 August Chichester married Mrs Mure, but in 1863 he successfully applied to the court for this marriage to be declared void, bringing an action against "Virginia Elizabeth Mure, falsely called Virginia Elizabeth Chichester", on the grounds that no divorcee could remarry within three months of the decree. The Spectator drily called this "a fact which Mr. Chichester, with his large experience in such cases, would, one would think, have known", and added that "the case is just one of those which create the vulgar belief that the class to which Mr. Chichester belongs is exceptionally immoral".

== Bankruptcy ==
In July 1866 Chichester, then living at 55, Sloane Street, Knightsbridge, responded to an action in bankruptcy by entering into an arrangement with his creditors to pay them 2s 6d in the pound (12.5%) in three instalments.

== Peerages ==
In 1853, Chichester's father, Lord Edward, became heir presumptive of his elder brother George Chichester, 3rd Marquess of Donegall, when the marquess' only surviving son died unmarried in Naples. On 20 October 1883, at the age of 84, Lord Edward finally succeeded his brother as Marquess of Donegall, together with several subsidiary titles, and George Chichester gained the courtesy title of Earl of Belfast. As a large part of the Donegall estates were not entailed, they were inherited by Chichester's cousin Harriet Augusta Anna Seymourina, wife of Anthony Ashley-Cooper, 8th Earl of Shaftesbury.

On his father's death in 1889, Chichester became the 5th Marquess of Donegall and also the 5th Baron Fisherwick, in the Peerage of Great Britain, giving him a seat in the House of Lords. He is not recorded as ever having spoken there.

== Later marriages ==
On 31 August 1865 Chichester married secondly Mary Anne Williams Cobb, the youngest daughter of Edward Cobb, of Arnold, Kent, and Kensington. The marriage was childless, and his wife died in November 1901, her final address being 7, Upper Rock Gardens, Brighton. Probate of her will was granted to Alice Cobb, widow, and all of her property was valued at £43.

In February 1902, weeks after the death of his second wife (or perhaps first wife, since his first marriage had been declared void), Donegall advertised in The Daily Telegraph for a lady "willing to purchase the rank of a peeress... for twenty-five thousand pounds sterling, paid in cash to her future husband, she must be a widow or a spinster—not a divorcee." Country Life later commented that this "scarcely suggests a fairytale romance" and described Donegall as "an old roué", continuing "May one speculate on the appropriateness of the Donegall coat-of-arms? The supporters are two red wolves held in chains of gold." On 23 December 1902, by now aged eighty, Lord Donegall married thirdly Violet Gertrude Twining (1880–1952) only daughter of Henry St George Twining, a banker of Halifax, Nova Scotia, and Coombe Oak, Kingston Hill, Surrey, and they had one child, Edward Chichester, born on 7 October 1903, who became Marquess of Donegall when his father died on 13 May 1904. Donegall, whose address at death was 117, Cromwell Road, Kensington, died at 42, Norfolk Road, Brighton, leaving an estate valued at only £27.

His widow died on 8 October 1952, at the age of 72. His infant son Edward grew up to become a journalist and war correspondent.

== Notes ==
Peerage of Ireland
Preceded by Edward Chichester	Marquess of Donegall; 1889–1904	Succeeded by Edward Chichester
Preceded by Edward Chichester	Earl of Donegall; 1889–1904	Succeeded by Edward Chichester
Preceded by Edward Chichester	Viscount Chichester; 1889–1904	Succeeded by Edward Chichester
Preceded by Edward Chichester	Baron Chichester; 2nd creation 1889–1904	Succeeded by Edward Chichester
Peerage of Great Britain
Preceded by Edward Chichester	Baron Fisherwick; 1889–1904; Member of the House of Lords (1889–1904)	Succeeded by Edward Chichester
