= Sewallis Shirley =

Sewallis Shirley may refer to:

- Sewallis Edward Shirley, 10th Earl Ferrers (1847–1912), British peer
- Sewallis Shirley (MP) (1844–1904), British politician
- Sewallis Shirley (1709–1765), British MP for Brackley and Callington
