= Thomas Kirkland =

English physician and medical writer

Thomas Kirkland M.D. (1721–1798) was an English physician and medical writer.

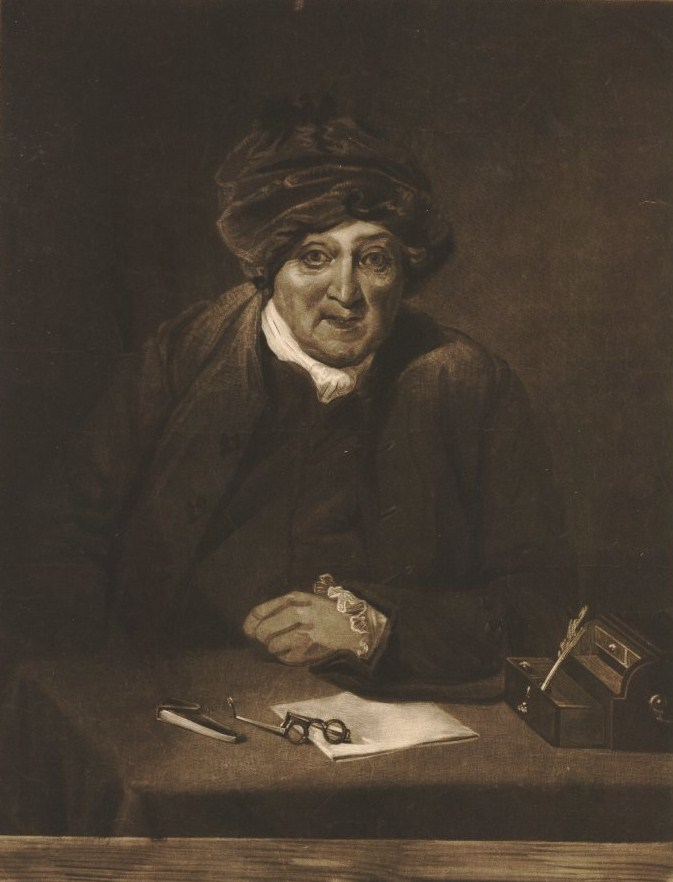
Thomas Kirkland

== Life ==
Kirkland was born at Ashbourne, Derbyshire, the son of Thomas Kirkland, an attorney, and his father's second wife, Mary Allsop. After a grammar school education he was apprenticed to a surgeon in Loughborough. He studied under Thomas Lawrence in London.

Kirkland became a surgeon at Ashby-de-la-Zouch, Leicestershire. In January 1760 he became involved in the murder case around Laurence Shirley, 4th Earl Ferrers: he was called in to attend the steward of Lord Ferrers after he had been shot by his master. Kirkland, detained to dinner with the disturbed Earl, left the house covertly, brought a magistrate with armed men, and removed the wounded steward, Johnson, who soon died. He was a witness at the trial.

By 1774 Kirkland had graduated M.D. at Edinburgh. He subsequently became a member of the Royal Medical Societies of Edinburgh and London. He died at Ashby-de-la-Zouch on 17 January 1798.

== Works ==
Kirkland's writings were:

- A Treatise on Gangrenes, Nottingham, 1754.
- An Essay on the Methods of Suppressing Hæmorrhages from Divided Arteries, London, 1763.
- An Essay towards an Improvement in the Cure of those Diseases which are the cause of Fevers, London, 1767.
- A Reply to Mr. Maxwell's Answer to his Essay on Fevers; wherein the Utility of the Practice of Suppressing them is further exemplified, London, 1769.
- Observations on Mr. Pott's General Remarks on Fractures, etc.; with a Postscript concerning the Cure of Compound Dislocations, London, 1770 (Appendix, 1771). Against Percivall Pott.
- A Treatise on Childbed Fevers... with two Dissertations, the one on the Brain and Nerves, the other on the Sympathy of the Nerves, etc. (included in Essays on the Puerperal Fever, published by the Sydenham Society in 1849), London, 1774.
- Animadversions on a late Treatise on the Kink-Cough. To which is annexed an Essay on that Disorder, London, 1774, published anonymously. Against Dr. William Butter.
- Thoughts on Amputation; being a Supplement to the Letters on Compound Fractures, and a Comment on Dr. Bilguer's book on this operation; also, an Essay on the use of Opium in Mortifications, London, 1780. Johann Ulrich von Bilguer, a Prussian military surgeon, had written against amputation, and a book of his had appeared in English in 1764.
- An Essay on the Inseparability of the different Branches of Medicine, (London, 1783).
- An Account of the Distemper Among the Horned Cattle: At Caulk in Derbyshire, in 1783. And of the Remedies Recommended, for the Cure, with Observations (1783)
- An Inquiry into the Present State of Medical Surgery, 2 vols., London, 1783-6. With Appendix, edited by his son, James Kirkland, surgeon to the Tower of London, 1813.
- A Commentary on Apoplectic and Paralytic Affections, and the Diseases connected with the Subject, London, 1792.
- Observations on the Use and Abuse of Mercury as a Cure for Syphilis, as a letter to Samuel Foart Simmons.

== Notes ==
Attribution

This article incorporates text from a publication now in the public domain: Lee, Sidney, ed. (1892). "Kirkland, Thomas". Dictionary of National Biography. Vol. 31. London: Smith, Elder & Co.
