= Staunton Harold Hall =

Country house in Leicestershire, England

Coordinates: 52.7844°N 1.4389°W

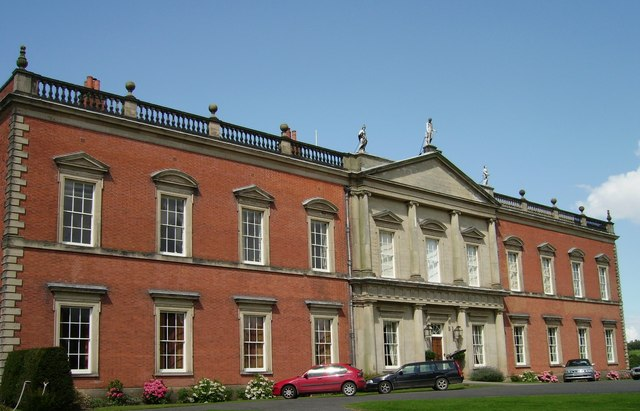
Staunton Harold Hall

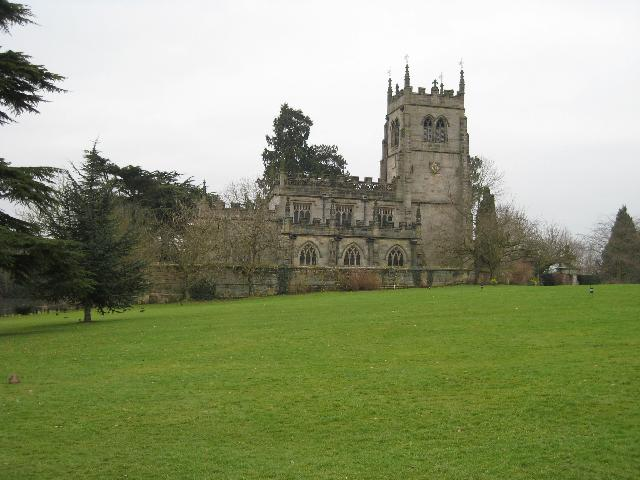
Holy Trinity Chapel

Staunton Harold Hall is a large 18th-century Grade I listed country house built by the Earls Ferrers, situated within the 2,000-acre (810 ha) Staunton Harold Park in Staunton Harold, Leicestershire, England, which includes the 17th-century Grade I listed Holy Trinity Chapel (Staunton Harold church).

== History ==
The Shirley family had lived in Staunton Harold for many generations. Sir Robert Shirley built the church in the hall grounds in 1653 in the Commonwealth era.

The present hall was originally a Jacobean building built for Robert Shirley, 1st Earl Ferrers as a family seat for the newly ennobled Shirley family and remained so until the 20th century. The fourth earl, Laurence Shirley, 4th Earl Ferrers, was tried, condemned and hanged for killing his steward. The hall was rebuilt in its present form in 1763 for Washington Shirley, 5th Earl Ferrers. It is a Georgian two-storey brick house with stone dressings in the form of a square enclosing a quadrangle. Sewallis Shirley, 10th Earl Ferrers inherited the hall in 1859 and sold most of the land. Robert Shirley, 12th Earl Ferrers gifted the church to the National Trust and put the estate up for auction. In 1955 it was acquired by Leonard Cheshire for use as a Cheshire Home and sold in 1980 to be used as a Sue Ryder Care home. The Hall once again became a family home in 2003.

The stable block is occupied by a number of small craft enterprises as the Ferrers Centre for Arts and Crafts.
