= Edward Chichester, 4th Marquess of Donegall =

Irish peer

The Most Honourable The Marquess of Donegall

Member of the House of Lords (Note: As Baron Fisherwick.)
- Lord Temporal
- In office 20 October 1883 – 20 January 1889
- Preceded by: The 3rd Marquess of Donegall
- Succeeded by: The 5th Marquess of Donegall

Personal details
- Born: 11 June 1799
- Died: 20 January 1889 (aged 89)
- Spouse: Amelia Spread Deane O'Grady (m. 1821)
- Children: 5
- Parent: George Chichester, 2nd Marquess of Donegall (father)
- Other titles: 8th Earl of Donegall; 9th Viscount Chichester; 9th Baron Chichester; 4th Baron Fisherwick

Edward Chichester, 4th Marquess of Donegall (11 June 1799 – 20 January 1889), was a clergyman who late in life became an Irish peer. From 1831 until October 1883, he was known as The Very Rev. Lord Edward Chichester. He was the son of the 2nd Marquess of Donegall.

== Early life ==
Born in Great Cumberland Place, Westminster, Chichester was educated at Eton and Trinity College, Dublin (TCD), where he graduated BA in 1822.

== Career ==
As a younger son, he became a minister of the Church of Ireland and served as Dean of Raphoe from 1831 to 1871.

== Marquess of Donegall ==
In 1853, his older brother's only surviving son, Frederick Richard Chichester, Earl of Belfast (1827–1853), died unmarried in Naples, leaving Lord Edward as the heir presumptive to the marquessate. In October 1883, at the age of 84, he finally succeeded his 86-year-old elder brother and became the 4th Marquess of Donegall. He died six years later in St Leonards-on-Sea, Sussex, and was buried in Kensal Green Cemetery, London.

== Personal life ==
On 21 September 1821, he married Amelia Spread Deane O'Grady, the third daughter of Henry Deane O'Grady by his marriage to Dorcas Spread. They had five children:

- George Augustus Hamilton (27 June 1822 – 13 May 1904)
- Annabella Augusta, who on 23 July 1844 married the 9th Earl Ferrers, and was the mother of the 10th Earl Ferrers (1847–1912).
- Dorcas Juliana Fanny
- Henry Fitzwarine (born 11 September 1834)
- Adolphus John Spencer Churchill (born 18 December 1836), who married Mary, the only child of Robert Peel Dawson, of Moyola Park, Castledawson, and died in 1901. He was the father of Robert Chichester and great-grandfather of the Baron Moyola, Prime Minister of Northern Ireland 1969–1971, and of Sir Robin Chichester-Clark.

A large part of the Donegall estates was not entailed and in 1883 were inherited by the 3rd Marquess's only surviving child, Harriet Augusta Anna Seymourina, the wife of the 8th Earl of Shaftesbury.

== Arms ==
Coat of arms of Edward Chichester, 4th Marquess of Donegall
Coronet That of a marquess. Crest A stork, proper, wings expanded, holding in its beak an eel, argent, head or. Escutcheon Quarterly: 1st and 4th, chequy, or and gule, a chief vair (Chichester); 2nd and 3rd, azure fretty argent (Etchingham). Supporters Two wolves gules, ducally gorged and chained or. Motto Invitum sequitur honor (Honour follows, though unsought for).

== Notes ==
Peerage of Ireland
Preceded by George Chichester	Marquess of Donegall; 1883–1889	Succeeded by George Chichester
Preceded by George Chichester	Earl of Donegall; 1883–1889	Succeeded by George Chichester
Preceded by George Chichester	Viscount Chichester; 1883–1889	Succeeded by George Chichester
Preceded by George Chichester	Baron Chichester; 2nd creation 1883–1889	Succeeded by George Chichester
Peerage of Great Britain
Preceded by George Chichester	Baron Fisherwick; 1883–1889; Member of the House of Lords (1883–1889)	Succeeded by George Chichester
