= Earl Ferrers =

Earldom in the Peerage of Great Britain

- Arms of Shirley, Earls Ferrers: Paly of six, or and azure, a canton ermine.
- Creation date: 1711
- Created by: Anne
- Peerage: Great Britain
- First holder: Robert Shirley, 1st Earl Ferrers
- Present holder: Robert Shirley, 14th Earl Ferrers
- Heir apparent: William Shirley, Viscount Tamworth
- Subsidiary titles: Viscount Tamworth; Baronet Shirley of Staunton
- Seat: Ditchingham Hall
- Motto: Honor vertutus premium (Honour is the reward of valour)

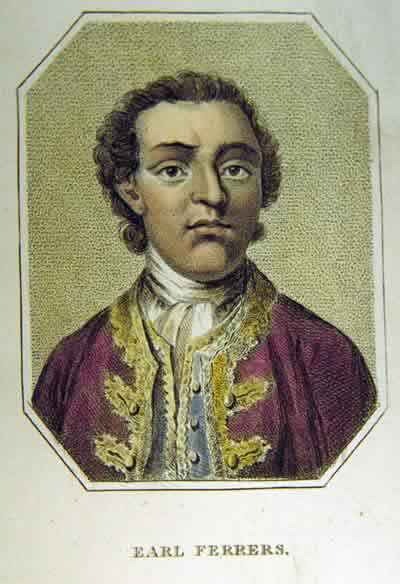
Laurence Shirley, 4th Earl Ferrers, engraving dated 1810

Earl Ferrers is a title in the Peerage of Great Britain. It was created in 1711 for Robert Shirley, 14th Baron Ferrers of Chartley. The Shirley family descends from George Shirley (died 1622) of Astwell Castle, Northamptonshire. In 1611 he was created a Baronet, of Staunton Harold in the County of Leicester, in the Baronetage of England. He was succeeded by his son Henry, the second Baronet, who married Lady Dorothy Devereux, daughter of Robert Devereux, 2nd Earl of Essex. On the death of her brother Robert Devereux, 3rd Earl of Essex, she became the youngest co-heir to the baronies of Ferrers of Chartley and the barony of Bourchier, which had fallen into abeyance on the death of the third Earl. Shirley was succeeded by his eldest son, the third Baronet. He died unmarried and was succeeded by his younger brother, the fourth Baronet. He was imprisoned in the Tower of London by Oliver Cromwell and died there in 1656. On his death the title passed to his eldest son, the fifth Baronet. He died at an early age and was succeeded at birth by his posthumous son, the sixth Baronet.

He died as an infant and was succeeded by his uncle, the seventh Baronet. In 1677 King Charles II terminated the abeyance of the Ferrers of Chartley barony in his favour and he became the thirteenth Baron. His claim to the Bourchier barony was overlooked, however. He later served as Master of the Horse and as Lord Steward to the queen consort, Catherine of Braganza, and was Lord Lieutenant of Staffordshire. In 1711 he was created Viscount Tamworth, of Tamworth in the County of Stafford, and Earl Ferrers, in the Peerage of Great Britain. He was succeeded in the barony of Ferrers of Chartley by his granddaughter Elizabeth, wife of James Compton, 5th Earl of Northampton. She was the daughter of the first Earl's eldest son the Hon. Robert Shirley (1673–1698), who predeceased his father (see the Baron Ferrers of Chartley for further history of this title). Lord Ferrers was succeeded in the baronetcy, viscountcy and earldom by his second son, the second Earl. He served as Lord Lieutenant of Staffordshire from 1725 to 1729. He died childless and was succeeded by his younger brother, the third Earl. He was Lord Lieutenant of Staffordshire from 1731 to 1742.

He died unmarried and was succeeded by his nephew, the fourth Earl. He was the son of the Hon. Lawrence Shirley, third surviving son of the first Earl. Lord Ferrers killed Mr. Johnson, his land-steward, was tried, condemned for murder and hanged at Tyburn on 5 May 1760. Ferrers petitioned to be beheaded at the Tower of London as had been the case with noble lords before him. He is the last British peer to die a felon's death. On his death the titles passed to his younger brother, the fifth Earl. He was a vice-admiral in the Royal Navy. He was childless and was succeeded by his younger brother, the sixth Earl. His eldest son, the seventh Earl, died childless and was succeeded by his younger brother, the eighth Earl. When the latter died the titles passed to his grandson, the ninth Earl. He was the son of Robert William Shirley, Viscount Tamworth, eldest son of the eighth Earl. He was succeeded by his son, the tenth Earl. On his death in 1912 the line of the sixth Earl failed. The late Earl was succeeded by his fourth cousin, the eleventh Earl. He was the great-great-grandson of Reverend the Hon. Walter Shirley, brother of the fourth, fifth and sixth Earls. As of 2010 the titles were held by his grandson, the thirteenth Earl, who succeeded his father in 1954 until death in 2012. Lord Ferrers was a prominent Conservative politician and held office in every Conservative administration from 1962 to 1997. He was one of the ninety elected hereditary peers that remain in the House of Lords after the passing of the House of Lords Act 1999. As of 2014 the titles are held by his elder son, the fourteenth Earl, who succeeded in 2012.

The Ferrers earldom is the senior earldom in the Peerage of Great Britain.

The family seat is Ditchingham Hall, near Ditchingham, Norfolk.

== Shirley baronets, of Staunton Harold (1611) ==
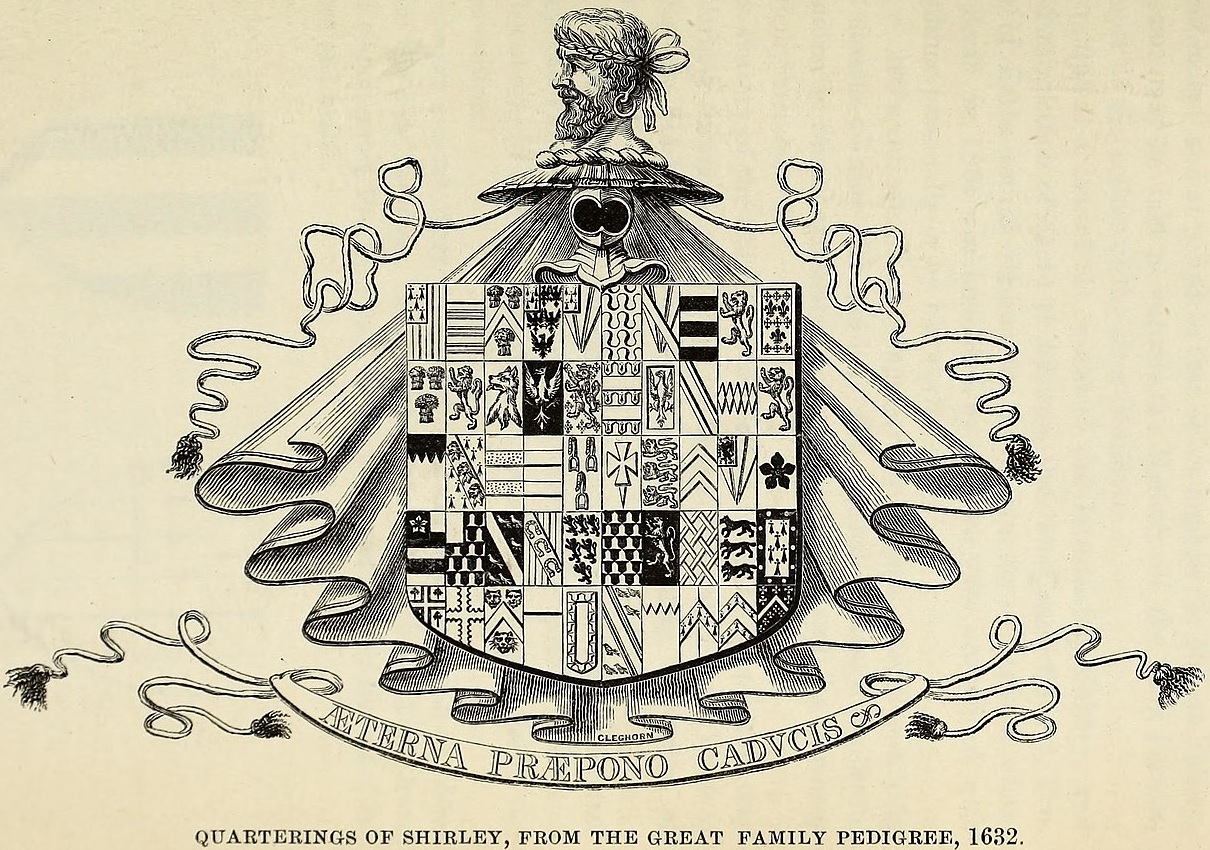
"Quarterings of Shirley from the Great Family Pedigree, 1632"

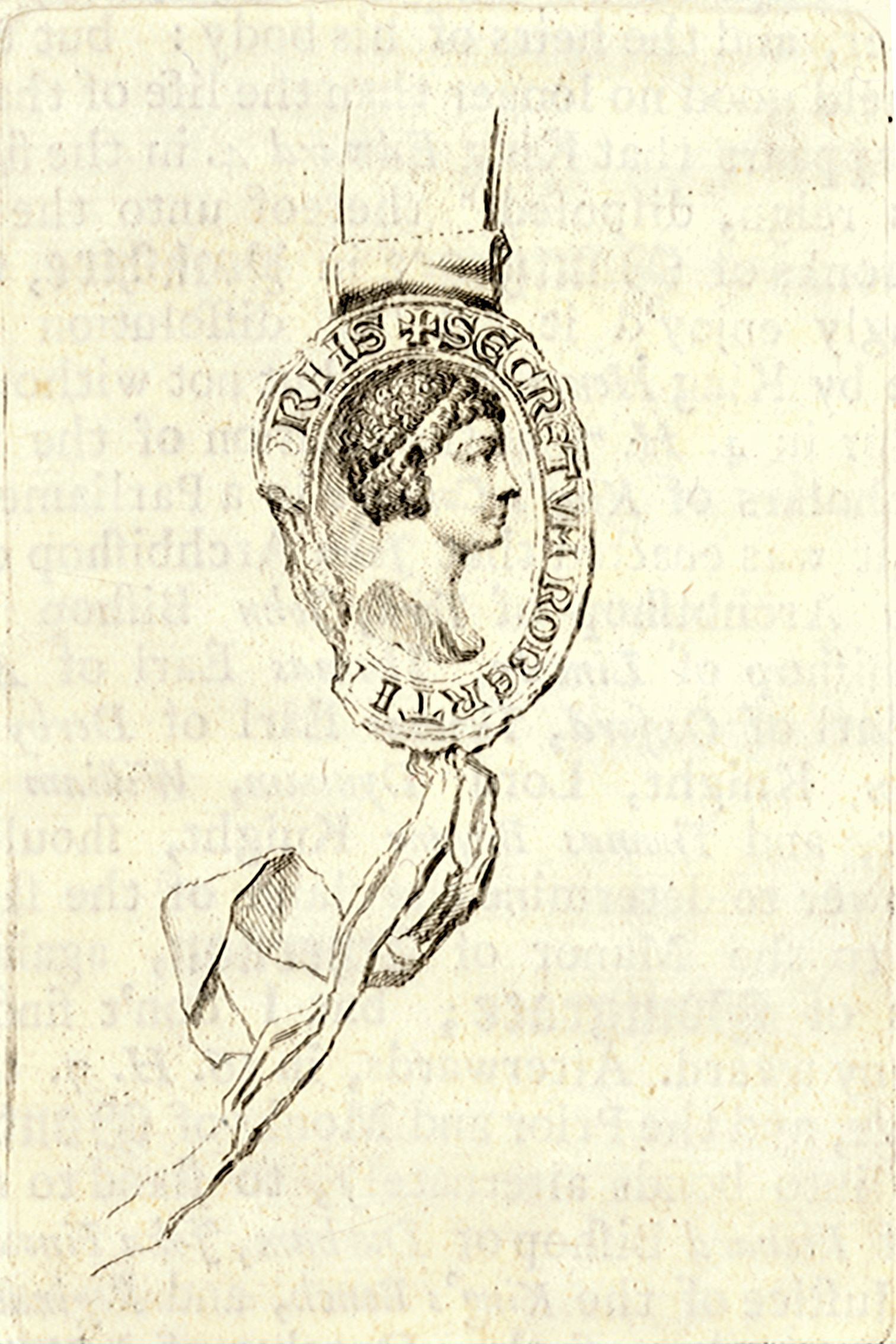
Seal of Robert, Earl Ferrers, on etching by Wenceslaus Hollar

- Sir George Shirley, 1st Baronet (1559–1622)
- Sir Henry Shirley, 2nd Baronet (c. 1588–1633)
- Sir Charles Shirley, 3rd Baronet (1623–1646)
- Sir Robert Shirley, 4th Baronet (1629–1656)
- Sir Seymour Shirley, 5th Baronet (1647–1667)
- Sir Robert Shirley, 6th Baronet (1668–1669)
- Sir Robert Shirley, 7th Baronet (1650–1717) (confirmed as Baron Ferrers of Chartley in 1677 and created Earl Ferrers in 1711)

== Earls Ferrers (1711) ==
- Robert Shirley, 1st Earl Ferrers (1650–1717)
- Washington Shirley, 2nd Earl Ferrers (1677–1729)
- Henry Shirley, 3rd Earl Ferrers (1691–1745)
- Laurence Shirley, 4th Earl Ferrers (1720–1760)
- Washington Shirley, 5th Earl Ferrers (1722–1778)
- Robert Shirley, 6th Earl Ferrers (1723–1787)
- Robert Shirley, 7th Earl Ferrers (1756–1827)
- Washington Shirley, 8th Earl Ferrers (1760–1842)
- Washington Sewallis Shirley, 9th Earl Ferrers (1822–1859)
- Sewallis Edward Shirley, 10th Earl Ferrers (1847–1912)
- Walter Shirley, 11th Earl Ferrers (1864–1937)
- Robert Walter Shirley, 12th Earl Ferrers (1894–1954)
- Robert Washington Shirley, 13th Earl Ferrers (1929–2012)
- Robert William Saswalo Shirley, 14th Earl Ferrers (born 1952)

Line of succession (simplified)
- Robert Shirley, 1st Earl Ferrers (1650–1717)
  - Washington Shirley, 2nd Earl Ferrers (1677–1729)
  - Henry Shirley, 3rd Earl Ferrers (1691–1745)
  - Hon. Laurence Shirley (1693–1743)
    - Laurence Shirley, 4th Earl Ferrers (1720–1760)
    - Washington Shirley, 5th Earl Ferrers (1722–1778)
    - Robert Shirley, 6th Earl Ferrers (1723–1787)
      - Robert Shirley, 7th Earl Ferrers (1756–1827)
      - Washington Shirley, 8th Earl Ferrers (1760–1842)
        - Robert William Shirley, Viscount Tamworth (1783–1830)
          - Washington Shirley, 9th Earl Ferrers (1822–1859)
            - Sewallis Shirley, 10th Earl Ferrers (1847–1912)
    - Walter Shirley (1725–1786)
      - Walter Shirley (1768–1859)
        - Walter Augustus Shirley (1797–1847)
          - Walter Waddington Shirley (1828–1866)
            - Walter Shirley, 11th Earl Ferrers (1864–1937)
              - Robert Shirley, 12th Earl Ferrers (1894–1954)
                - Robert Shirley, 13th Earl Ferrers (1929–2012)
                  - Robert Shirley, 14th Earl Ferrers (born 1952)
                    - (1). William Robert Charles Shirley, Viscount Tamworth (born 1984)
                      - (2). Hon. Alfred Richard Robert Shirley (born 2023)
                    - (3). Hon. Frederick James Walter Shirley (born 1990)
                      - (4). Theodore James Timothy Shirley (born 2021)
                  - (5). Hon. Andrew John Carr Sewallis Shirley (born 1965)
                    - (6). Henry Benedict Shirley (born 1997)
                    - (7). George Sewallis Shirley (born 1999)
  - Hon. George Shirley (1705–1787)
    - Evelyn Shirley (1756–1810)
      - Evelyn John Shirley (1788–1856)
        - Evelyn Philip Shirley (1812–1882)
          - Sewallis Evelyn Shirley (1844–1904)
            - Evelyn Charles Shirley (1889–1956)
              - John Evelyn Shirley (1922–2009)
                - male issue and descendants in remainder

== Present peer ==
Robert William Saswalo Shirley, 14th Earl Ferrers (born 29 December 1952), is the son of the 13th Earl and his wife Annabel Mary Carr. Styled Viscount Tamworth from 1954, he was educated at Ampleforth College and became a chartered accountant. He co-founded the Ruffer Investment Company with Jonathan Ruffer and worked there until his retirement in 2021.

He was a group auditor and senior treasury analyst for BICC plc between 1986 and 1988 and financial controller for Viking Property Group between 1987 and 1992. He is a Fellow of the Institute of Chartered Accountants in England and Wales.

In 2003, he lived at The Old Vicarage, Shirley, Ashbourne, Derbyshire. On 13 November 2012, he succeeded as the Earl Ferrers (G.B., 1711) and Viscount Tamworth (G.B., 1711) and is also the 20th Shirley baronet (E., 1611).

On 21 June 1980, Shirley married Susannah Mary Sheepshanks, daughter of Charles Edward William Sheepshanks, and they have three children:

- Lady Hermione Mary Annabel Shirley (born 1982)
- William Robert Charles Shirley, Viscount Tamworth (born 1984), heir apparent
- Hon. Frederick James Walter Shirley (born 1990)

== Notes ==
Baronetage of England
Preceded by Mansel baronets	Shirley baronets of Staunton; 22 May 1611	Succeeded by Stradling baronets
