= Paul Shirley (politician) =

American politician

Paul Shirley served in the California legislature. During the Mexican–American War, he served in the US Army.
