= Donal Shirley =

Irish hurler

Personal information
- Born: 2005 (age 20–21) Tubber, County Offaly, Ireland
- Occupation: Student

Sport
- Sport: Hurling
- Position: Left wing-forward
Club
- Years: Club
- 2023-present: Tubber
Club titles
- Offaly titles: 0
College
- Years: College
- 2023-present: DCU Dóchas Éireann
College titles
- Fitzgibbon titles: 0
Inter-county
- Years: County
- 2024-: Offaly
Inter-county titles
- Leinster titles: 0
- All-Irelands: 0
- NHL: 0
- All Stars: 0

Donal Shirley (born 2005) is an Irish hurler. At club level he plays with Tubber and at inter-county level with the Offaly senior hurling team.

== Career ==
At school, Shirley played hurling and Gaelic football as a student at Moate Community School. He was part of the school's senior team beaten by Naas CBS in the final of the Leinster PPS SAFC in 2023. Shirley has also lined out for DCU Dóchas Éireann.

At club level, Shirley first appeared at juvenile and underage levels with the amalgamated Broans Gaels/Clara team. He won an Offaly MBHC title in 2022 after a defeat of Ballinamere/Durrow in the final. Shirley lines out as a dual player with the Tubber club at adult level.

Shirley first appeared on the inter-county scene for Offaly as a dual player at minor level. His last game in the minor hurling grade was a defeat by Tipperary in the 2022 All-Ireland minor final. After a one-year absence from inter-county activity, Shirley progressed to the under-20 team. He won an All-Ireland U20HC medal after beating Tipperary by 2–20 to 2–14 in the 2024 All-Ireland under-20 final.

Shirley made his senior team debut during the 2024 National Hurling League. He won a Joe McDonagh Cup medal in his debut season after a defeat of Laois in the final.

== Honours ==
Brosna Gaels/Clara

- Offaly Minor B Hurling Championship: 2022

Offaly

- Joe McDonagh Cup: 2024
- All-Ireland Under-20 Hurling Championship: 2023,2024
- Leinster Under-20 Hurling Championship: 2024
- Leinster Minor Hurling Championship: 2022
