= Hunter B. Shirley =

American psychologist and professor

Hunter Barentine Shirley
- Born: December 25, 1927; Jennings, Louisiana
- Died: November 1, 2010 (aged 82); Česká Lípa, Czech Republic
- Citizenship: American
- Education: La Sorbonne
- Scientific career
- Fields: Psychology
- Workplaces: University of Wisconsin

Hunter B. Shirley (December 25, 1927 – November 1, 2010), born Hunter Barentine Shirley, was an American licensed clinical psychologist. He is credited with having developed the most sophisticated model of the human mind of his time.

== Life ==
Shirley was an associate professor at Wisconsin State University where he headed a psychological research laboratory devoted to evaluating the world's first analog model of the mind. He was later the Director of the International Division of the American Institute of Applied Behavioral Research and Human Relations Training. Once Director of Behavior Analysis, Inc. of St. Louis, he was subsequently director of the Counseling and Testing Center at the University of Louisiana at Lafayette, and later served as the Chief Clinical Psychologist of the Lafayette Institute of Behavior Therapy and Crisis Management.

With offices in Staré Splavy near Prague, Shirley was in charge of a "think tank" performing behavioral science research for NGOs and government agencies.

== Works ==
Shirley was the author of a number of books, includingMapping the Mind, and a popular self-help book Your Mind May Be Programmed Against You!. His final work The Human Mind: A Guided Tour compiled his theories on the emotional system and the human mind. It includes over 300 diagrams of the emotional system based on the cybernetics approach he presented in Mapping The Mind, and in published articles.

- (1972) Psychovector analysis: A new discipline within the behavioral sciences. Journal of Psychology, 80, 135 – 145.
- (1976) Emotion as a Three-Valued Variable. Psychological Reports
- (1977) Toward an Operable Simulation Model of Personality. Journal of Psychology
- (1981) Your Mind May Be Programmed Against You
- (1983) Mapping The Mind ISBN 0-911012-19-2
- (1996) An Introduction to Psychofeedback Training: Paper presented to the Slovenian National Academy of the Arts and Science
- (2000) The Uses of Psychofeedback Training in Psychiatry. An address delivered to the Palackeho University Medical School, Olomouc, Czech Republic
- (2003) Designing "Hard Science" Type Models of Perception, Cognition, and Memory. Theory and Science 4:2]
- (2004) " Psychofeedback training: Mood Monitoring. Personality Study and Group Behavior Vol.24

== Private life ==
Hunter B. Shirley married Anne Shirley. He had three children Faustine, Remy and Raphaele Shirley. In 1995 he moved from Lafayette, Louisiana, where he held a private practice for over 15 years, to Central Europe. There he remarried Ava Shirley with whom he lived for the last ten years of his life until he died in 2010 at Česká Lípa, in the Czech Republic.
