= Walter Shirley (priest and controversialist) =

English clergyman, hymn-writer and controversialist

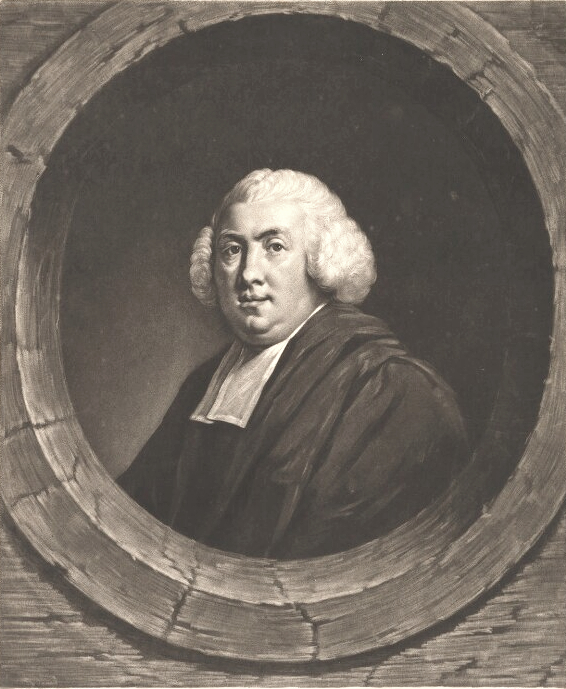
Walter Shirley, 1773 engraving

Walter Shirley (1725–1786) was an English clergyman, hymn-writer, and controversialist, of Calvinist and Methodist views.

== Life ==
The fourth son of the Hon. Laurence Shirley and Anne, daughter of Sir Walter Clarges, bart., he was born at Staunton Harold, Leicestershire, on 23 September 1725. His father was youngest son of Robert Shirley, 1st Earl Ferrers; Laurence Shirley, 4th Earl Ferrers was his elder brother, and Selina Hastings, Countess of Huntingdon, was his first cousin.

In 1742 Shirley matriculated at New College, Oxford, graduating B.A. in 1746, and the same year became rector of Loughrea, County Galway. His family connection with the Countess of Huntingdon brought him into intimate touch with the revivalist movements of the time. He became friendly with the Wesleys and George Whitefield, and from about 1758 he was one of the most loyal friends they had within the Church of England, which he belonged to all his life. He was often absent from Loughrea, and he became familiar speaker at English and Irish revivalist meetings. Robert Southey remarks that his intentions in his advocacy of Wesley were better than his judgment, since he belonged to the most dogmatic section of the movement. His work as a revivalist preacher brought him repeatedly into conflict with his bishop and fellow clergy. The bishop of Clonfert censured him in June 1778 and advised him to drop his Methodism, while some clergymen petitioned the archbishop to reprimand him for preaching in Plunkett Street Chapel, Dublin.

In the Methodist controversy on justification by faith provoked by John Wesley's Arminianism and the proceedings at the conference of 1770, Shirley took an active part on the Calvinist side with his cousin, the Countess of Huntingdon, as whose chaplain he acted for a time, and Augustus Toplady. A circular issued by him inviting the clergy and laity to oppose Wesley drew from John William Fletcher of Madeley his ‘Checks to Antinomianism,’ and Shirley's influence embittered the dispute. William Romaine, Henry Venn, and John Berridge were among his close associates. His portrait hung in the library of Cheshunt College, in the foundation of which he took an interest.

In his later years Shirley suffered from dropsy, and of this he died on 7 April 1786; he was buried in St. Mary's Church, Dublin.

== Works ==
Shirley's published works are:

- Gospel Repentance, 1760, Dublin.
- Twelve Sermons, with an Ode on the Judgment Day, 1761, Dublin; reprinted with additional odes to Truth and Liberty, 1764, London.

His best known works are hymns. In 1774 he assisted the Countess of Huntingdon in revising the hymns used in her chapels, and the collection included some of his own work. He is author of the missionary hymn, Go, destined vessel, heavenly freighted, go! written on the departure of some missionaries for America in 1772; of Flow fast, my tears, the cause is great; Source of light and power divine, and others.

== Family ==
Shirley married, on 27 August 1766, Henrietta Maria, eldest daughter of John Phillips of Dublin, and by her had two sons and three daughters. His elder son, Walter, was father of Walter Augustus Shirley.
