= Raphaele Shirley =

American sculptor

- Born: Raphaele Shirley; June 13, 1969; Wisconsin, US
- Occupations: Artists, multi-media, light sculpture
- Years active: 1990 – present

Raphaele Shirley (born 1969 in Wisconsin, US) is a French-American multi-media artist. She has been working at the intersection of the art and technology since 1993. Her practices include sculpture, light art, public art, collaborative works and performance. Her works have been documented and reviewed in publications such as the Art Newspaper, Art in America, Art Forum, and Canvas Magazine.

== Overview ==
Shirley is a multi-media artist whose work spans installation art, light sculpture, video, art collectives, live performances and social intervention. Her work deals with questions of space, time, primordial life forces, and the ephemeral. Since her beginnings in New York City (1993), where she currently lives and works, she has been instrumental in the creation of several large-scale social projects such as [PAM] Perpetual Art Machine and the New York International Fringe Festival. She has been awarded several grants recently from the Norwegian arts council for commissioned public and video works. Several of the projects she has been involved in have received international acclaimed awards. She shows her work nationally and internationally.

She has worked in collaboration with renowned artists and directors such as Aaron Beall, Karin Coonrod, Elaine Summers, Richard Foreman, Dino Lupelli, Randolph Curtis Rand and Gh Hovagimyan.

For live performances she has collaborated with the following musicians: Rhys Chatham, David Watson, Peter Zummo, Kevin Shea, Laura Ortman, Algis Kizys, Vincent Signorelli, Lynn Wright, Eric Hubel, Katarina Raska and Anna Liisa Eller.

== Early life ==
Shirley is daughter of Hunter B. Shirley, a psychologist and theoretician, and Anne Couelle from the French Couelle family, known for their reconstruction of churches, export of historical churches including part of the New York city Cloisters, stone quarry and architecture. She is the youngest of three children. She moved to Aix-en-Provence in her early teens and began to explore sculpture, photography and other art forms through elective art courses. In the early 90s, she enrolled at the Ecole des Beaux Arts of Aix-en-Provence, France.

== Training ==
Between 1997 and 2002, she worked as a studio assistant for Nam June Paik, the US-based Korean artist and founder of video art, assisting him in the development with Norman Ballard of a number of public laser works displayed at the Olympic Park Lake in Seoul, Korea and in his Retrospective "The Worlds of Nam June Paik" at the S.R.Guggenheim, New York U.S.A. and Bilbao, Spain. She also participated in the construction, installation and take down of numerous of his CRT-based sculptures including "Tv Fish" ( Holly Soloman Gallery), "The Megatron" (The Smithsonian Museum of American Art), "Tv Garden" ( S.R. Guggenheim Museum ). Since 2005 she has been an active contributor for the restoration and preservation of Nam June Paik CRt based art works for Museums around the world. She has extended her efforts in collaboration with CTL Electronics Inc. to help museums and private collections in the restoration of numerous new media artworks of artists such as Bruce Nauman, Diana Thater, Gary Hill, Bill Viola, Robert Irwin to name a few. [edit]

== Curator/Social Interventions ==
In 1997, Shirley was a founding member of The New York International Fringe Festival and co-directed Fringe Al Fresco up until 2001, which staged over 100 artists for the first two years of the festival in public locations all over the Lower East Side in New York. From 2002-2004, with director and impresario Aaron Beall, she founded the Times Square Arts Center, installed in the former notorious Adult entertainment center on 42nd and 8th avenue in New York called "Show World", where over 100 performances, screenings and installations were organized. In 2005 she co-founded the project [PAM] Perpetual Art Machine, an interactive installation and video art collective of over 2000 members and video artists.[PAM] presented over 50 exhibitions drawing from the video art collective worldwide.

== Body of work ==
In 2008 Shirley began sculpting in pure light. Light Shot 0910 explores the spirituality of geometry through two mysterious rectangles of light intersecting in mid-air, shown in a solo exhibit at the Chelsea Art Museum. Shooting Stair uses light diodes and high-pressured mist to form a staircase made of light, installed outdoors in a private collection in Southampton, New York.

Light and geography intersect powerfully with community in two recently commissioned public pieces which brought Shirley to Norway, the first a massive outdoor light sculpture, the second a film. Jewels of Kvinesdal, dramatically overlooking the Kvinesdal fjord, consists of an open-air arena from which a diagonal tower of light beams into the night sky, visible to communities many kilometers away. This installation was curated by Torill Haugen at the Utsikten Kunstsenter Art Center in Kvinesdal Municipality, Norway.

Stargaze in Sandnes is a 14-minute film combining communal and geologic memory, past and future, utopia and dystopia, employing topographical maps, 3D animation, and old family films provided by the people of Sandnes, Norway. This project was funded by Norway's KinoKino Art center and the Norwegian Arts Council. Here work was shown alongside Gustave Deutsch and Bjorn Melhus' commissioned work. The exhibition was toured to The Museum of Moving Image in New York.

During The Arctic Circle, a residency led by the FARM Foundation, Shirley created a series of immersive earth and light works while sailing the Arctic, documented in a series of photographic prints.

Her Norway and Arctic expeditions were preceded by her similarly experiential ‘’Sunken City’’ projects. For these installations Shirley used silicone and bronze, bathed in lasers, fog and dense soundscapes, to create a language of architecture and urban space both ancient and futuristic, terrifying and utopian. These were exhibited in Basel, New York, and Brooklyn.

Shirley solo and collaborative projects have also been exhibited at the KAI art center in Estonia, The Queens Museum, Museum of Moving Image, the former Chelsea Art Museum, New York, USA, the Moscow Biennale, New York, the Video Lounge at ArtBasel Miami 2006, and The State Hermitage Museum in St. Petersburg Russia.

Shirley worked as part of the PROJECTED SPIRAL- concept for Flint Michigan 2014. Which was a concept for a Sustainable Land and light art piece for Chevey in the Hole, Flint, Michigan for the Flint Public Art Project curated by Stephen Zacks.

Shirley created 67. Double is a combination of an outer aluminium disk and a second low-relief wood painted with a neon ring affixed to its face. The whole is perceptually concave or convex, dark or reflective depending on the viewing angle and ambient lighting. In this work the accumulated paint on the front surface is reminiscent of lunar craters or refers to abstractions of the Colour Field movement. The crisp white light and shimmering silver of the background evoke the sublime.

100 pink smoke flares was a series of ephemeral outdoor installations consisting of 100 to 200 smoke flares lit simultaneously, temporarily masking the landscape behind it.

/e-media-c\ is a collaboration with David Watson, Peter Zummo and Kevin Shea. activate a static installation with the physicality of sound, light and time. The live work is set in the bracketed space of two mirrored parabolic disks. The large rotating parabolics function as set and sculpture as well as lo-fi speakers and projectors.

6.6 and 4 is a sculpture consisting of a concentric wooden ringed structure that expands outwards from the wall in a concave quarter sphere, a silver aluminium disk and neon. The wood is left natural frontally, Dutch metal leafed on its back and is backlit with a white neon strip.

Shirley Updates her Instagram frequently about new projects and collaborations.

Shirley lives in Brooklyn, New York.

== See also ==
Selected Exhibitions/ performances

2019 - Opening performance for the KAI art center in Tallinn, Estonia.

2018 - /e-media-c\ - Creative tech week- Hunter's college Black Box- New York. with David Watson, Peter Zummo, Kevin Shea.

2016 - 12.6 Lyrae - The Chimney - Brooklyn, New York

2010 – 0910 Light Shots – Chelsea Art Museum. Project Room for New Media – New York City, NY

2010 – Arctic Lights – Dorfman Projects – New York City, NY.

2009 – Jewels of Kvinesdal – Utsikten Art Center – Kvinesdal, Norway (public art commission)

2010 – Docks Art Fair – Marc de Puechredon Gallery – Lyon, France.

2008 – Sunken City – Marc de Puechredon Gallery – Basel, Switzerland

2008 – Sunken City Episode II – Emily Harvey Foundation – New York City, NY.

2007 – Sunken City Preludes – PowerHouse Projects – Brooklyn, NY.
