= Francis Shirley =

16th-century English politician

Francis Shirley (c.1524 – 24 March 1578), was an English politician.

He was the eldest son of Thomas Shirley of West Grinstead.

He was a justice of the peace for Sussex from 1564 until his death and was appointed High Sheriff of Surrey and Sussex for 1573–74. He was elected a member (MP) of the parliament of England for New Shoreham in 1555.

He married Barbara, the daughter of Sir Richard Blount of Mapledurham, Oxfordshire and Dedisham, Sussex, with whom he had 2 sons and 2 daughters. He was succeeded by his elder son Thomas, who inherited the manor of Buddington, the house at West Grinstead, lands in Horsham, Lancing and Steyning, and a manor in Somerset.
