= Ditchingham Hall =

Country house in Norfolk, England

Coordinates: 52.4829°N 1.4160°E

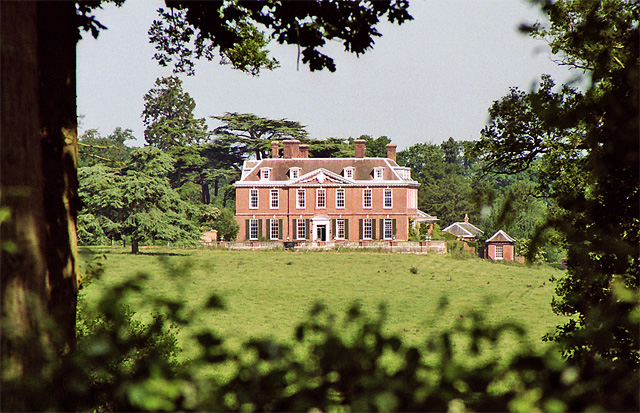
Ditchingham Hall

Ditchingham Hall is an English country house, near the village of Ditchingham in south Norfolk, England, which is set in about 2,000 acres (810 ha) of parkland landscaped by Capability Brown. The Hall is about 2 miles (3.2 km) northwest of Ditchingham off the B1332 road between Bungay, Suffolk and Norwich. It is the country house of Earl Ferrers since it was inherited by the 13th Countess Ferrers. The current owner is Robert William Saswalo Shirley, 14th Earl Ferrers. It is a private house and not open to the public.

== History ==
The house was built in 1710 by Revd John James Bedingfeld and replaced an earlier one. In 1885, the house and estate were bought from the Bedingfield family by William Carr. The hall was enlarged in 1910 by his son, also William Carr, but reduced in size in the 1980s.

The writer Diana Athill was brought up in Ditchingham Hall. The Great Storm of 1987 did great damage to the estate trees according to the German author W. G. Sebald who was visiting at the time.
