= Caroline Girle =

Caroline Girle (27 December 1736 – 17 November 1817) was a diarist who kept a journal throughout her life. Although some volumes were destroyed, what remains is in the British Library. These journals earned her the sobriquet "The Oxfordshire Diarist".

== Family ==
Girle was the daughter of John Girle FRS (c. 1702–1761) and Barbara Slaney (1717–1801), and had an elder brother, John (1735–1746). On 5 August 1762, in Whitchurch-on-Thames, Oxfordshire, Girle married Philip Lybbe Powys; they had four children:

1. Caroline (1763–1764)
2. Philip Lybbe (1765–1838)
3. Thomas (1768–1817)
4. Caroline Isabella (1775 – 28 August 1838), who married the Rev. Edward Cooper, a first cousin of Jane Austen.
