= Washington Shirley, 8th Earl Ferrers =

British nobleman

The Right Honourable Washington Shirley
- Earl Ferrers
- Coat of arms
- Tenure: 1827–1842
- Predecessor: Robert Shirley, 7th Earl Ferrers
- Successor: Washington Shirley, 9th Earl Ferrers
- Born: 13 November 1760
- Died: 2 October 1842 (aged 81); Stowe-by-Chartley
- Buried: Staunton Harold
- Spouses: Frances Ward (m. 1781; died 1812) Sarah Davy (m. 1829; died 1835)
- Issue: Lady Frances Shirley; Robert William Shirley, Viscount Tamworth; Julia Shirley
- Father: Robert Shirley, 6th Earl Ferrers
- Mother: Catherine Cotton

Washington Shirley, 8th Earl Ferrers (13 November 1760 – 2 October 1842), styled The Honourable Washington Shirley from 1778 to 1827, was a British hereditary peer.

== Early life and education ==
Ferrers was the third son of Robert Shirley, 6th Earl Ferrers and his wife Catherine Cotton. He was educated at Westminster School.

On 19 May 1780, he was appointed a cupbearer in the Royal Household, but this sinecure was abolished on 14 November 1782.

== Later life ==
Ferrers succeeded his elder brother, Robert, in the earldom in 1827.

On 13 July 1832, he was appointed a Deputy Lieutenant of Leicestershire.

== Marriages and children ==
Shirley married Frances Ward (d. 4 March 1812), daughter of The Reverend William Ward and granddaughter of William Ward, on 24 July 1781 at Gretna Green. They had one son and two daughters:

- Lady Frances Shirley (23 March 1782 – 5 February 1834), unmarried
- Robert William Shirley, Viscount Tamworth (24 August 1783 – 2 February 1830), married Anne Weston on 12 December 1821, with whom he had two sons and a daughter:
  - Hon Rosamond Anne Myrtle Shirley (25 September 1818 – 2 April 1865), married Hon Henry Hanbury-Tracy on 19 January 1841
  - Washington Sewallis Shirley, 9th Earl Ferrers (3 January 1822 – 13 March 1859)
  - Lt Hon Robert William Devereux Shirley (14 December 1825 – 4 June 1849), 87th Foot
- Julia Anne Shirley (6 February 1785 – 23 November 1825)

After the death of his first wife, Ferrers married Sarah Davy (d. 30 June 1835) on 28 September 1829. They had no children.

== Death ==
Lord Ferrers died at Chartley on 2 October 1842 at the age of 81 and was buried at Staunton Harold. His only son having predeceased him, Ferrers was succeeded in the earldom by his grandson, Washington.

Peerage of Great Britain
Preceded by Robert Shirley	Earl Ferrers; 1827–1842	Succeeded by Washington Shirley
