= Robert Shirley, 13th Earl Ferrers =

British politician

The Right Honourable The Earl Ferrers PC DL

Deputy Leader of the House of Lords
- In office January 1988 – May 1997
- Prime Minister: Margaret Thatcher; John Major
- Preceded by: The Lord Belstead
- Succeeded by: The Baroness Jay of Paddington
- In office November 1979 – May 1983
- Prime Minister: Margaret Thatcher
- Preceded by: The Lord Goronwy-Roberts
- Succeeded by: The Lord Belstead

Minister of State for Environment and Countryside
- In office 6 July 1995 – 2 May 1997
- Prime Minister: John Major
- Preceded by: The Viscount Ullswater
- Succeeded by: Michael Meacher

Minister of State for Consumer Affairs
- In office 20 July 1994 – 6 July 1995
- Prime Minister: John Major
- Preceded by: Office established
- Succeeded by: Office abolished

Minister of State for Home Affairs
- In office 10 January 1988 – 20 July 1994
- Prime Minister: Margaret Thatcher; John Major
- Preceded by: The Earl of Caithness
- Succeeded by: Michael Forsyth

Minister of State for Agriculture, Fisheries and Food
- In office 7 May 1979 – 13 June 1983
- Prime Minister: Margaret Thatcher
- Preceded by: Edward Stanley Bishop
- Succeeded by: John Selwyn Gummer

Parliamentary Secretary to the Ministry of Agriculture, Fisheries and Food
- In office 8 January 1974 – 4 March 1974
- Prime Minister: Edward Heath
- Preceded by: Peggy Fenner
- Succeeded by: Roland Moyle

Lord-in-waiting Government Whip
- In office 5 January 1971 – 8 January 1974
- Prime Minister: Edward Heath
- Preceded by: The Lord Bethell
- Succeeded by: The Lord Sandys
- In office 3 December 1962 – 10 October 1964
- Prime Minister: Harold Macmillan; Alec Douglas-Home
- Preceded by: The Marquess of Lothian
- Succeeded by: Lord Hobson

Member of the House of Lords
- Lord Temporal
- Hereditary peerage 31 January 1955 – 11 November 1999
- Preceded by: The 12th Earl Ferrers
- Succeeded by: Seat abolished
- Elected Hereditary Peer; 11 November 1999 – 13 November 2012
- Election: 1999
- Preceded by: Seat established
- Succeeded by: The 5th Viscount Ridley

Personal details
- Born: Robert Washington Shirley; 8 June 1929
- Died: 13 November 2012 (aged 83)
- Party: Conservative
- Spouse: Annabel Carr
- Children: 5
- Parent(s): Robert Shirley, 12th Earl Ferrers; Hermione Justice Morley

Robert Washington Shirley, 13th Earl Ferrers (8 June 1929 – 13 November 2012), styled Viscount Tamworth between 1937 and 1954, was a British Conservative politician and member of the House of Lords as one of the remaining hereditary peers. He was one of the few people to serve in the governments of five prime ministers.

== Early life and education ==
Lord Ferrers was the eldest child and only son of Robert Shirley, 12th Earl Ferrers, and his wife Hermione Justice (née Morley). He was educated at West Downs School, Winchester College and Magdalene College, Cambridge.

He succeeded to the earldom in 1954 on the death of his father. He took his seat in the House of Lords on 2 February 1955.

== Military service ==
Ferrers received an emergency commission as a second lieutenant in the Coldstream Guards on 27 November 1948, serving in Malaya. His commission was regularized on 4 March 1950, with seniority from 1 January 1949. He was promoted to lieutenant on 3 August 1950.

== Political career ==
An early contribution in parliament in 1957 was against the admission of women:

Frankly, I find women in politics highly distasteful. In general, they are organizing, they are pushing and they are commanding. Some of them do not even know where loyalty to their country lies. I disagree with those who say that women in your Lordships' House would cheer up our Benches. If one looks at a cross-section of women already in Parliament I do not feel that one could say that they are an exciting example of the attractiveness of the opposite sex. I believe that there are certain duties and certain responsibilities which nature and custom have decreed men are more fitted to take on; and some responsibilities which nature and custom have decreed women should take on. It is generally accepted that the man should bear the major responsibility in life. It is generally accepted, for better or worse, that a man's judgment is generally more logical and less tempestuous than that of a woman. Why then should we encourage women to eat their way, like acid into metal, into positions of trust and responsibility which previously men have held? If we allow women into this House where will this emancipation end? Shall we in a few years' time be referring to "the noble and learned Lady, the Lady Chancellor"? I find that a horrifying thought. But why should we not? Shall we follow the rather vulgar example set by Americans of having female ambassadors? Will our judges, for whom we have so rich and well-deserved respect, be drawn from the serried ranks of the ladies? If that is so, I would offer to the most reverend Primate the humble and respectful advice that he had better take care lest he may find himself out of a job. These examples may sound a little excessive, but I fail to see any reason whatever why, if one allows women to become Peers, this form of emancipation should not extend into those other positions of trust and responsibility which in the past have been carried out, and to such good effect, by men. There is another reason: in this age of science and statistics, where everything has to be accounted for and tabulated, where even the atom and the molecule are no longer a mass of red and green balls attached by pieces of wire which no well-intentioned student could ever understand, there are nevertheless three virtues which evade such tabulation: common sense, intuition and judgement; and I do not believe that the common sense, intuition and judgement of the public will allow women to be taken into those positions of trust of which I have spoken. I hope, therefore, that your lordships' judgement and logic will be such that women will not find their way here."

In the event, a small number of women came into the Lords as a result of the Life Peerages Act 1958. Women who held hereditary peerages in their own right were admitted by the Peerage Act 1963.

Ferrers served as a Lord-in-waiting (government whip) from 1962 until 1964 under both Harold Macmillan and Alec Douglas-Home. When the Conservatives were returned to power under Edward Heath, he once again served as a Lord-in-Waiting from 1971 to 1974, then serving as a Parliamentary Secretary at the Ministry of Agriculture, Fisheries and Food (MAFF) at the beginning of 1974.

When the Conservatives were returned to power under Margaret Thatcher in 1979, Lord Ferrers returned to MAFF, this time as a Minister of State. He left office in 1983, and returned to the backbenches in the Lords. In 1988 he returned to government service as a Minister of State at the Home Office, and in 1994 moved to the Department of Trade and Industry, where he remained until 1995, when he became Minister for the Environment at the Department of the Environment. Between 1979 and 1983, and again between 1988 and 1997, he served as Deputy Leader of the House of Lords.

With the passage of the House of Lords Act 1999, Ferrers along with almost all other hereditary peers lost his automatic right to sit in the House of Lords. He was, however, elected as one of the 92 elected hereditary peers to remain in the House of Lords pending completion of House of Lords reform, coming first in the ballot.

He was made a Privy Counsellor in the 1982 Birthday Honours. Earl Ferrers was a Vice-President of the Royal Stuart Society and Grand Prior of the Grand Bailiwick & Priory of England and Wales of the Military and Hospitaller Order of Saint Lazarus of Jerusalem. He was also High Steward of Norwich Cathedral from 1979-2007 and a Deputy Lieutenant of the County of Norfolk from 1983. He was moved to the retired list in 2004 upon reaching the Mandatory retirement age of 75.

Earl Ferrers was Deputy Leader of the House of Lords from 1979 to 1983 and from 1988 to 1997, and Minister of State in four different departments: at Agriculture, Food and Fisheries from 1979 to 1983; at the Home Office from 1988 to 1994; at the Department of Trade and Industry (in charge of small firms and consumer affairs) from 1994 to 1995; and at the Department of the Environment (responsible for environment and the countryside) from 1995 to 1997.

== Personal life ==
In 1951, then styled Viscount Tamworth, he married Annabel Carr (1930–2019), daughter of William Greenwood Carr. The couple had five children:

- Robert William Saswalo Shirley, 14th Earl Ferrers (born 29 December 1952), a chartered accountant
- Lady Angela Mary Shirley (b. 16 June 1954)
- Lady Sallyanne Margaret Shirley (22 March 1957 – 6 July 2011)
- Lady Selina Clare Shirley (1 July 1958 – 2 June 1998), in whose memory the Royal Academy's Selina Chenevière Travel Award was founded
- The Hon. Andrew John Carr Sewallis Shirley (born 24 June 1965).

The family country seat is Ditchingham Hall near the village of Ditchingham, south Norfolk. In the 1960s, Lord Ferrers ran a farm in Hedenham and in 1969 bought a farm in the nearby village of Mundham.

In 2011 his autobiography was published, Whatever Next? Reminiscences of a Journey Through Life (Biteback Publishing, 2011).

== Death ==
Lord Ferrers died in November 2012 at the age of 83. He was succeeded in the earldom by his elder son, Robert.

== Notes ==
Political offices
| Preceded by The Lord Hastings | Lord-in-waiting; 1962–1964 | New government |
| Preceded by The Lord Bethell | Lord-in-waiting; 1971–1974 | Succeeded by The Earl Alexander of Tunis |
| Preceded by The Lord Goronwy-Roberts | Deputy Leader of the House of Lords; 1979–1983 | Succeeded by The Lord Belstead |
| Preceded by The Lord Belstead | Deputy Leader of the House of Lords; 1988–1997 | Succeeded by The Baroness Jay of Paddington |
Peerage of Great Britain
| Preceded by Robert Shirley | Earl Ferrers; 1954–2012; Member of the House of Lords (1955–1999) | Succeeded by Robert Shirley |
| Preceded by Robert Shirley | Baron Ferrers of Chartley; 1954–2012 | Succeeded by Robert Shirley |
Baronetage of England
| Preceded by Robert Shirley | Baronet of Staunton Harold; 1954–2012 | Succeeded by Robert Shirley |
Parliament of the United Kingdom
| New office created by the House of Lords Act 1999 | Elected hereditary peer to the House of Lords under the House of Lords Act 1999; 1999–2012 | Succeeded by The Viscount Ridley |
