= Caroline Shirley, Duchess Sforza Cesarini =

Caroline Shirley, Duchess Sforza Cesarini (December 1818 – 17 November 1897) was an Englishwoman who married into the Italian aristocracy at the age of eighteen. She is noteworthy for having become, half a century later, the patroness of the writer Frederick Rolfe.

Caroline Shirley was born in England at around Christmas in 1818. It is known that she was baptized on 29 December that year in the Church of St Mary and St Chad at Brewood in Staffordshire, but the precise date of her birth cannot be established because in those days there was no requirement for the date of birth to be registered. Her father was Robert Sewallis Shirley, Viscount Tamworth (9 November 1778 – 6 June 1824), heir to Robert Shirley, 7th Earl Ferrers (1756–1827), and her mother was a servant girl in Earl Ferrers's household. Her father died when Caroline was only five, but her grandfather the Earl, when he died in 1827, left a will in which he made surprisingly generous provision for her.

In 1837 she married the thirty-year-old Duke Lorenzo Sforza Cesarini. By coincidence, Duke Lorenzo had also been born illegitimately. His mother, having fallen pregnant to a Russian officer, a Colonel named Carl Marshall, also of English descent, gave birth to the child in her husband's palazzo, and in 1834 the Roman Rota upheld Lorenzo's claim to the dukedom on the ground that a child born in the marital home was presumed in law to have been the legitimate offspring of the head of the house.

Lorenzo and Caroline were each heirs to a fortune, the security of which depended to some extent upon their nationality and religion, and the couple decided they should go through a sequence of four marriage ceremonies. They were first married in a brief civil ceremony at Gretna Green on 26 August 1837. Caroline was then received into the Catholic Church, and on 17 September Thomas Griffiths, Vicar Apostolic of London married the couple in his private chapel in Westminster. Then on 28 October their marriage was solemnised in an Anglican service at Trinity Church, St Marylebone, after which they left for the Papal States and a fourth ceremony to satisfy the requirements of the authorities in Rome.

The couple returned to Italy and watched with satisfaction as their two sons grew to manhood. Over the course of the 1850s, Caroline and her family were converted to the cause of a united Italy. When in 1860 the French emperor Napoleon III withdrew his troops from Rome, Lorenzo was appointed Commissary for the Piedmontese forces at Rieti. Caroline was unreservedly on the side of unification, and publicly defended the pro-unification troops, however unruly they became.

After Lorenzo's death in 1866, his two sons, Francesco and Bosio, began to use their homes to store guns. This caused the papal government to order the confiscation of all the Sforza Cesarini properties, not restored to them until Victor Emmanuel entered Rome in 1871, accompanied by Duke Francesco, Caroline's elder son, as one of his royal consiglieri. Throughout the remainder of her life Caroline was loath to accept that the papal authorities had had the slightest justification for their actions, which she preferred to characterise as petty harassment.

In 1890, the English writer Frederick Rolfe ('Baron Corvo') was expelled from the Scots College in Rome, where he had been testing his vocation to the Catholic priesthood. Duchess Caroline, who had been introduced to Rolfe by one of her young relatives, Mario Sforza Cesarini dei Conti Santa Fiora, took pity on him. She invited him to spend the summer at the Palazzo Sforza Cesarini at Genzano di Roma outside the capital where, according to his biographer, "he gained a lasting insight into Italian history and character". Rolfe made friends with a group of the local Genzano ragazzi, with whom he explored the local countryside and whom he later immortalised in his folk tales Stories Toto Told Me. When he returned to England in November 1890, the Duchess initially forwarded him a monthly allowance, on the understanding that he would work steadily on his writing, but she terminated this allowance several months later, playing no further part in his life. Rolfe experts believe that, in giving him the opportunity to imbibe Italian culture over many carefree months, Caroline was an important early influence on Rolfe's writing.
