= William Butter =

Scottish physician

- Born: 1726
- Died: 23 March 1805 (aged 78–79)
- Occupation: Physician

William Butter (1726 – 23 March 1805) was a Scottish physician.

== Biography ==
Butter as a native of Orkney, and studied medicine at the University of Edinburgh, where he graduated M.D. in 1761. After practising for some years at Derby, having obtained some note by his treatises ‘On the Kink-Cough’ (hooping cough), London, 1773, and ‘On Puerperal Fevers,’ London, 1775, he removed to London, where he died on 23 March 1805. He is said to have attempted to open the carotid artery of a patient at the Edinburgh Infirmary, and to have only desisted when the patient fainted after the first incision. He is described as ‘too much under the influence of very favourite hypotheses’ (Catalogue of Living English Authors, 1799, i. 401). Besides the above his writings include ‘A Method of Cure for Stone,’ Edinburgh, 1754; ‘Dissertatio de frigore quatenus morborum causa,’ Edinburgh, 1757; ‘Dissertatio de arteriotomia,’ Edinburgh, 1761; ‘A Treatise on Infantile Remittent Fever,’ London, 1782; ‘An Improved Method of Opening the Temporal Artery,’ London, 1783; ‘A Treatise on Angina Pectoris,’ London, 1791; ‘A Treatise on the Venereal Rose,’ London, 1799.
