= Laurence Shirley, 4th Earl Ferrers =

English nobleman (1720–1760)

The Right Honourable The Earl Ferrers
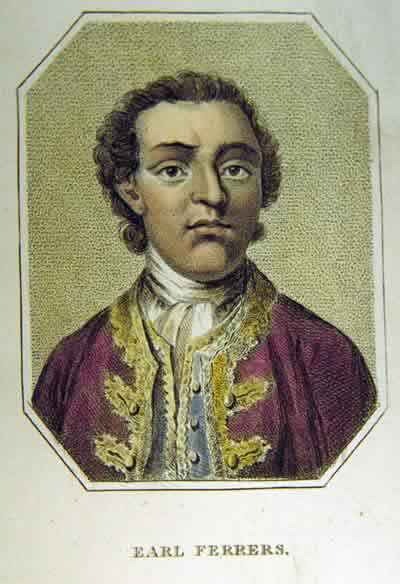

Personal details
- Born: 18 August 1720
- Died: 5 May 1760 (aged 39) Tyburn, Middlesex
- Spouse: Mary Shirley, Countess Ferrers
- Parent(s): Laurence Ferrers (son of Robert Shirley, 1st Earl Ferrers); Anne Clarges

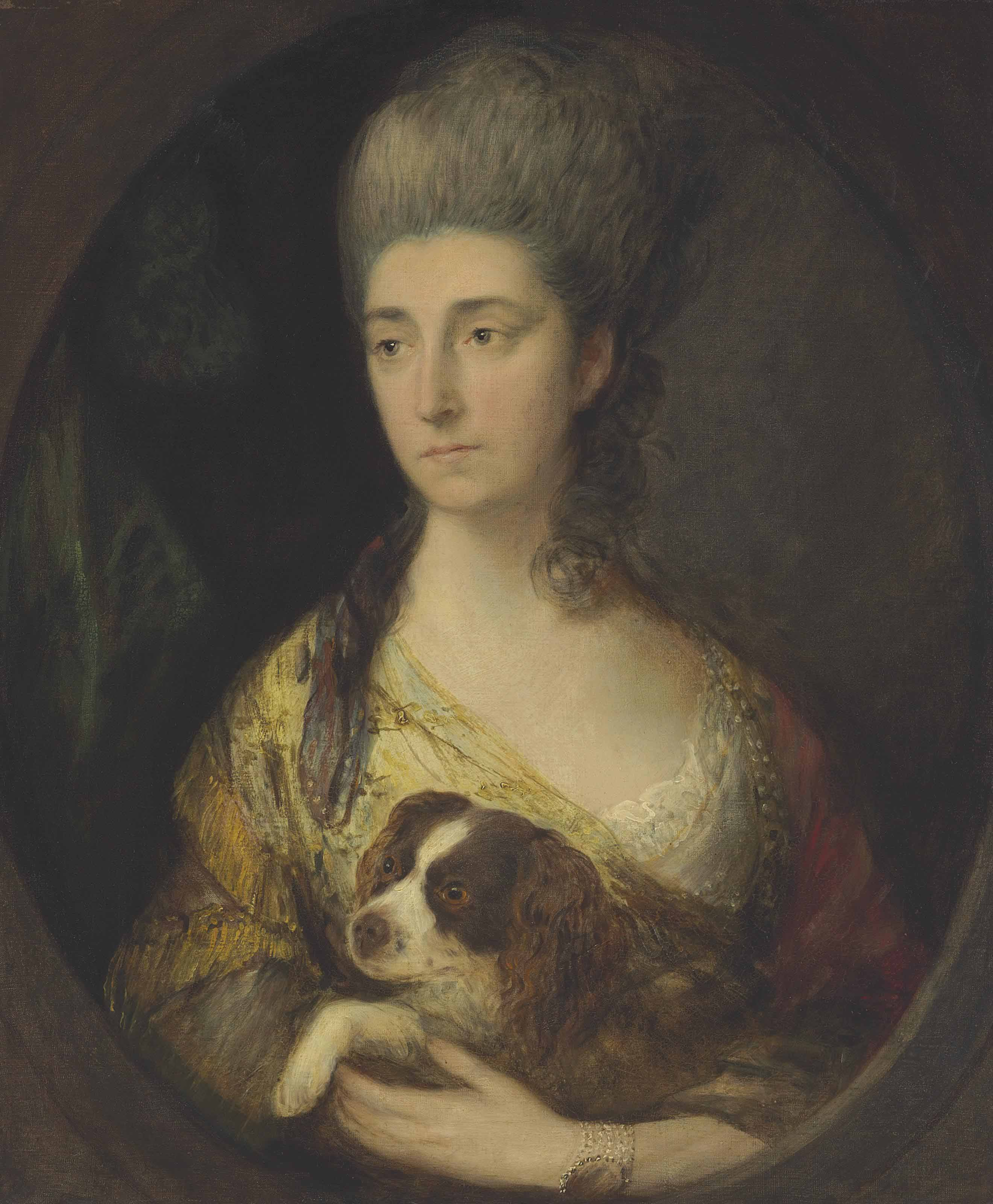
Lady Frederick Campbell, portrait by Thomas Gainsborough

Laurence Shirley, 4th Earl Ferrers (18 August 1720 – 5 May 1760) was an English nobleman, notable for being the last peer to be hanged, following his conviction for murdering his steward.

== Biography ==
Shirley was the eldest son of Laurence Ferrers, himself the third son of the first Earl Ferrers. At the age of twenty, he quit his estates and Oxford University education, and began living a debauched life in France in Paris. At the age of 25 he inherited his title from his insane uncle the 3rd Earl Ferrers, and with it estates in Leicestershire, Derbyshire and Northamptonshire. He lived at Staunton Harold Hall in northwest Leicestershire. In 1752, he married Mary, the youngest sister of Sir William Meredith, 3rd Baronet. Ferrers was also a cousin to Selina, Countess of Huntingdon, the prominent Methodist lady and supporter of George Whitefield, though he was not involved in the Methodist revival.

=== Marriage troubles ===
Ferrers had a family history of insanity, and from an early age his behaviour seems to have been eccentric, and his temper violent, though he was quite capable of managing his business affairs. Significantly, in 1758, his wife obtained a separation from him for cruelty, which was rare for the time. She would not accept her husband's drinking and womanising, and was particularly upset by his illegitimate children. The old family steward, Johnson, may have given evidence on Mary's behalf and was afterwards tasked with collecting rents due to her. After Ferrers' death she was married again, on 28 March 1769, to Lord Frederick Campbell. Mary later died in a fire at her country seat, Coomb Bank, Kent, on 25 July 1807.

=== Murder ===
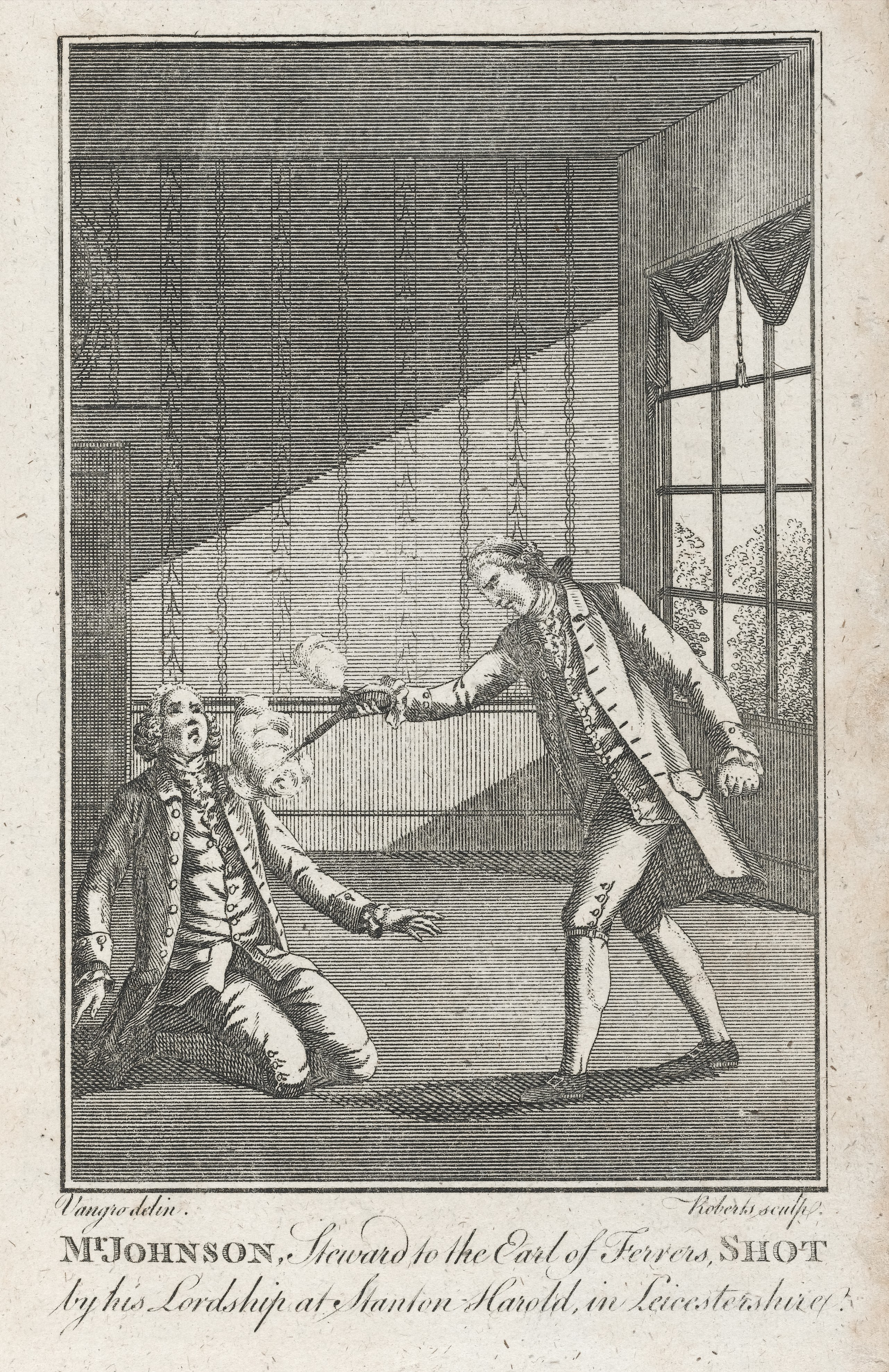
18th-century engraving of Lord Ferrers shooting his steward

The Ferrers' estates were then vested in trustees; Ferrers secured the appointment of an old family steward named Johnson, as receiver of rents. This man faithfully performed his duty as a servant to the trustees, and did not prove amenable to Ferrers' personal wishes. On 18 January 1760, Johnson called at the earl's mansion at Staunton Harold, Leicestershire, by appointment, and was directed to his lordship's study. Here, after some business conversation, Lord Ferrers shot him. Johnson did not die immediately, but instead was given some treatment at the hall followed by continued verbal abuse from a drunken Ferrers before a physician, Thomas Kirkland, was able to convey him to his own home where he died the following morning.

=== Trial ===
In the following April, Ferrers was tried for murder by his peers in Westminster Hall, with the Attorney General, Charles Pratt KC (later 1st Earl Camden), leading for the prosecution. Ferrers's defence, which he conducted in person with great ability, was a plea of insanity, and it was supported by considerable evidence, but he was found guilty. According to Horace Walpole, "Lord Ferrers was not mad enough to be struck with Lady Huntingdon's sermons. The Methodists have nothing to brag of his conversion, though Whitefield prayed for him." Ferrers subsequently said that he had only pleaded insanity to oblige his family, and that he had himself always been ashamed of such a defence. (Note: Asked by the Lord High Steward "why judgement of death should not pass upon you according to law," he answered "I am extremely sorry that I have troubled your lordships with a defence that I was always much averse to, and has given me the greatest uneasiness; but was prevailed on by my family to attempt it as it was what they themselves were persuaded of the truth of ... ." (19 Howell State Trials 885, 957-58). This is a fairly authoritative source and contains a full transcript of the proceedings, including the witnesses. The verdict of guilt was unanimous, including the peers who were judges. The tone of the trial was set by Pratt. He opened the case with the calm statement: "My lords, as I never thought it my duty in any case to attempt at eloquence, where a prisoner stood upon trial for his life; much less shall I think myself justified in doing it before your lordships; give me leave therefore to proceed to a narration of the facts." 19 Howell 895. He then summarized the facts as the witnesses would testify without any emotive coloring and concluded: "If he has any defence, God forbid that he should not have a fair opportunity of making it. Let him be heard with patience. The prosecutors will be as glad as your lordships to find him innocent." At 902.)

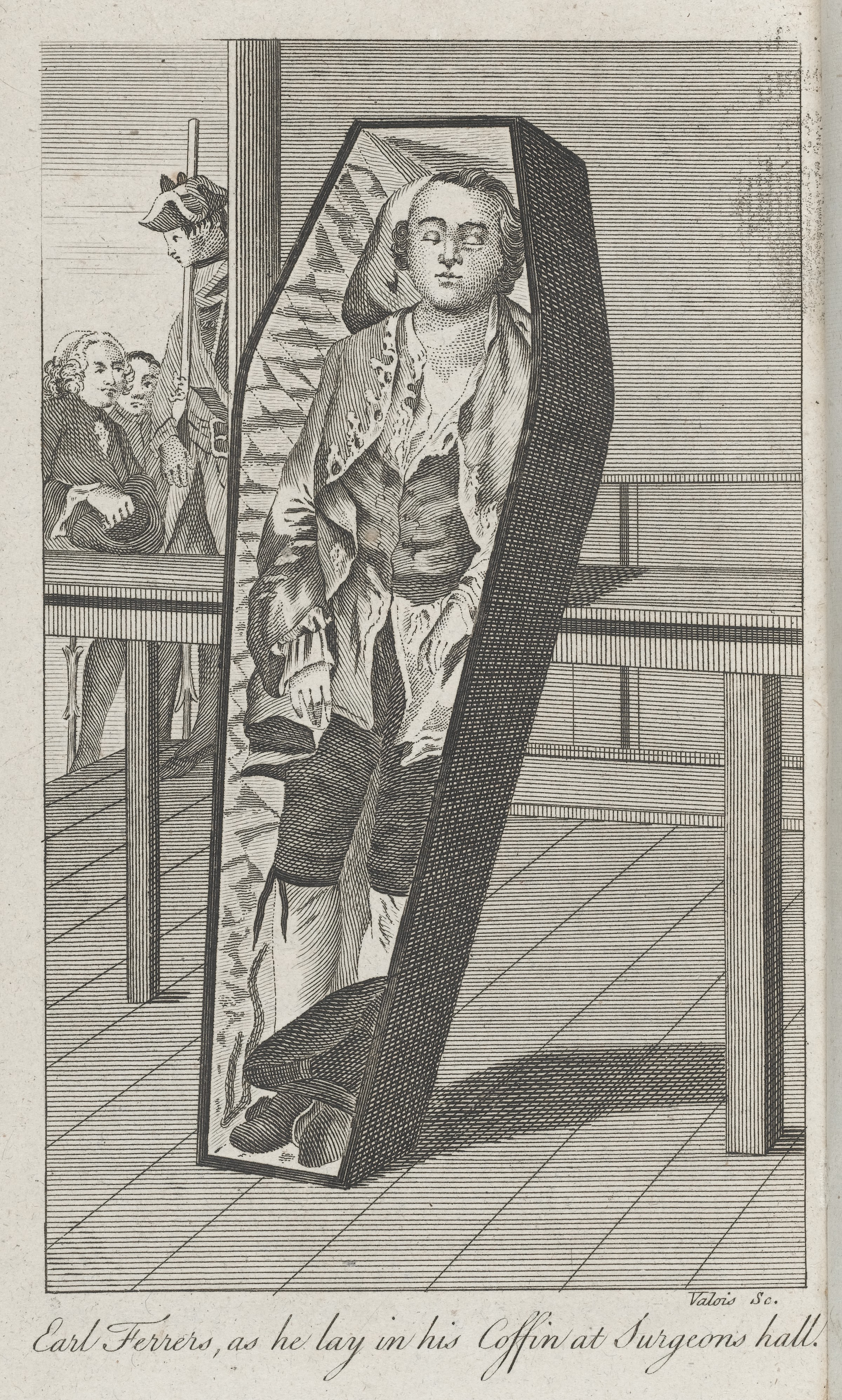
Lord Ferrers lying in his coffin

=== Execution ===
On 5 May 1760, aged 39, dressed in a light-coloured suit embroidered with silver (the outfit he had worn at his wedding), he was taken in his own carriage from the Tower of London to Tyburn and there hanged by Thomas Turlis. There are several illustrations of the hanging. It has been said that as a concession to his rank the rope used was of silk. After the execution his body was taken to the Surgeons' Hall in Old Bailey for dissection. The execution was widely publicised in popular culture as evidence of equality of the law, and the story of a wicked nobleman who was executed "like a common criminal" was told well into the 19th century. However, the barber-surgeons only made a cursory incision into the earl's body before handing it back to his family.

Lord Ferrers was succeeded in the earldom by his younger brother Washington.

=== Contemporary account ===
Caroline Powys witnessed the procession and wrote in her journal:

1760 - may 6

Earl Ferrers was carried from the Tower to Tyburn executed by a party of Horse and Foot Guards, a Clergyman and the two Sherifs were in the Coach with him he poor unhappy man was drest in his wedding suit, dating as he himself said his whole unhappy conduct from a forced marriage He observed that the apparatus, and being made a spectacle of to so vast a multitude was greatly worse than death itself the procession was two hours & 3/4 from setting out, the Landau & six in which he was ye Sheriffs each in their Chariots one mourning Coach and a Hearse attended, and return’d thro’ Lincolns Inn Fields about one, I think I never shall forget a procession so moving, to know a man an hour before in perfect health then a Lifeless course, yet a just victim to his Country, for the abuse of [f.7] of that power his rank in Life had given him a Title too, his rank indeed caused his punishment, as the good Old King, in answer to numerous petitions of his greatly to be pitied Family made this memorable speech, “ That for the last years of his Life, he had been beyond his most Sanguine hopes successful, for which he should ever return thanks to God, and on his part he had and always would endeavor to Administer justice as he ought, as Events had shown by the punishment of his most exalted Subjects.” This was a noble answer. yet none could help pitying this unhappy Lord, his intellects most probably was rather more in fault than his heart in the murder for which he Suffer’d, and had he been low born his majesty would have shewn more Mercy without such strict Justice.

== Notes ==
Peerage of Great Britain
Preceded by Henry Shirley	Earl Ferrers; 1745–1760	Succeeded by Washington Shirley
