= Mary Shirley, Countess Ferrers =

English noblewomen

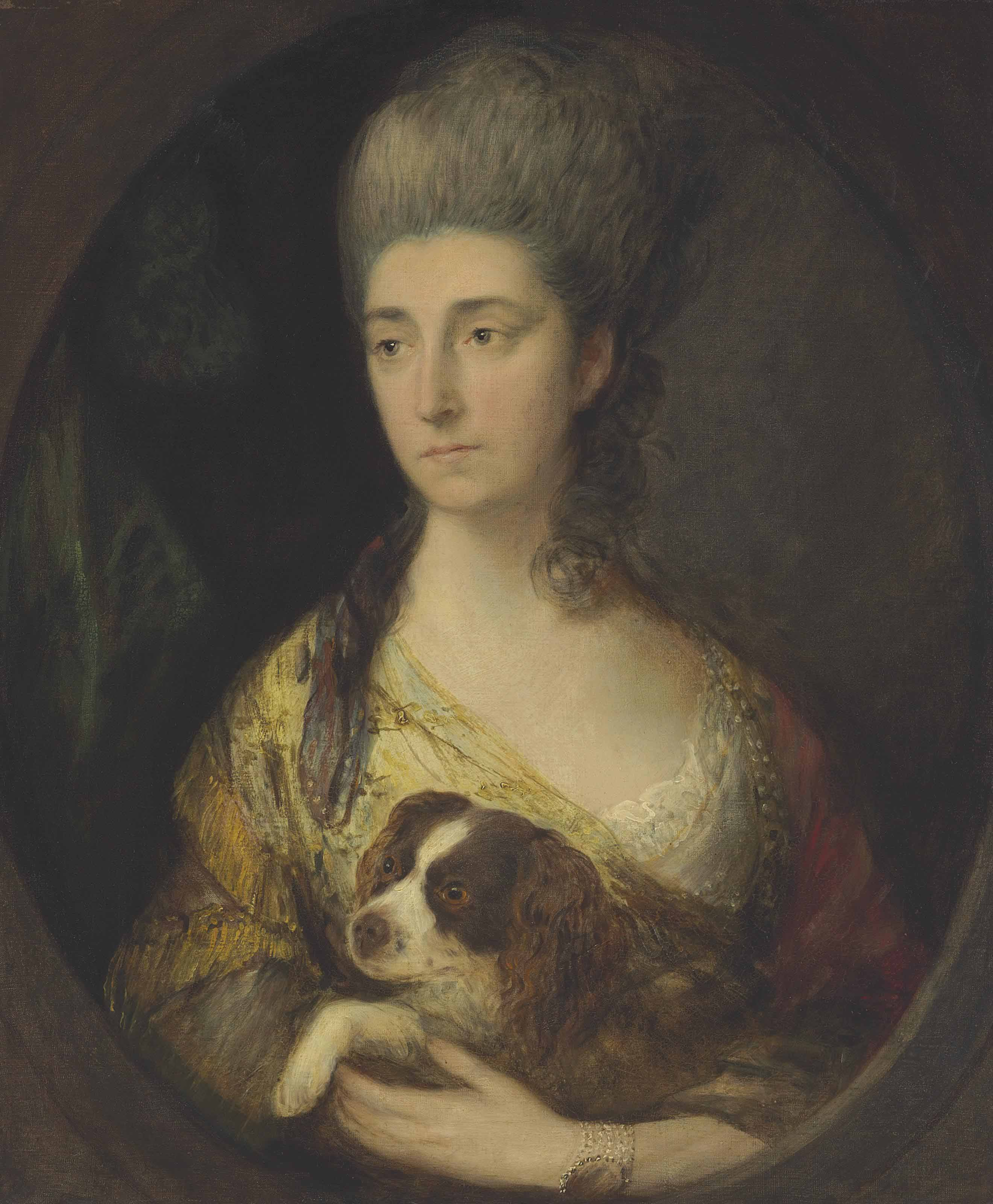
Lady Frederick Campbell, portrait by Thomas Gainsborough

Mary Shirley, Countess Ferrers, (née Meredith; bapt. 6 August 1733 – 25 July 1807), later Lady Frederick Campbell, was an English noblewoman.

== Early life ==
Mary was the youngest daughter of Amos Meredith or Meredyth of Henbury, Cheshire, and his wife, the former Joanna Cholmondeley. Her brother William was an MP and became 3rd Baronet Meredith in 1752, on the death of his grandfather.

== Personal life ==
On 16 September 1752, she married Laurence Shirley, 4th Earl Ferrers. In 1758, the couple legally separated, with Mary citing the earl's cruelty as the cause. He was widely believed to come from a family where mental illness was congenital, and in 1760 he was found guilty of murdering one of his servants, and was hanged at Tyburn in May 1760. At his execution he wore his wedding suit, claiming that his "unhappy conduct" was the result of "a forced marriage". There were no children from the marriage.

=== Second marriage ===
On 28 March 1769, Mary married Lord Frederick Campbell, the third son of John Campbell, 4th Duke of Argyll, and his wife, Mary (a daughter of John Bellenden, 2nd Lord Bellenden), at the Church of St Martin in the Fields. They had two daughters, including:

- Mary Campbell, who married Capt. Donald Campbell of Barbreck.

Lady Campbell was killed in a fire at their home, Combe Bank, Kent. Since the fire caused little damage to the house, it was speculated that Lady Campbell had suffered some kind of fit "with her head in the candle". Her second husband outlived her by nine years.
