= Walter Shirley, 11th Earl Ferrers =

British architect and nobleman

The Right Honourable Walter Knight Shirley FRIBA
- Earl Ferrers
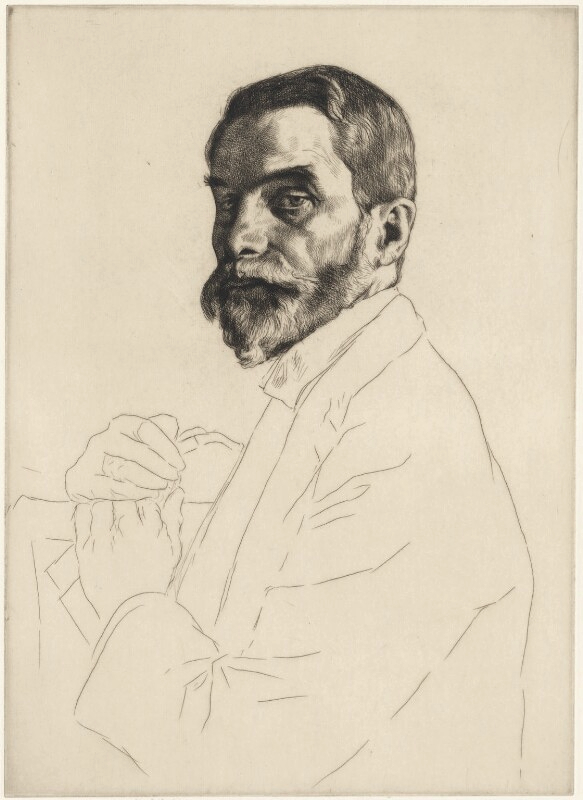

- Coat of arms
- Tenure: 1912–1937
- Predecessor: Sewallis Shirley, 10th Earl Ferrers
- Successor: Robert Shirley, 12th Earl Ferrers
- Born: 5 June 1864; Christ Church, Oxford
- Died: 2 February 1937 (aged 72)
- Spouse: Mary Jane Moon (m. 1890)
- Issue: Lady Margery Shirley; Elizabeth Shirley; Robert Shirley, 12th Earl Ferrers; Lady Phillida Shirley; Hon. Andrew Shirley
- Father: Prof. Rev. Walter Shirley
- Mother: Philippa Knight

Walter Knight Shirley, 11th Earl Ferrers FRIBA (5 June 1864 – 2 February 1937) was a British architect and hereditary peer.

== Early life and education ==
Ferrers was the second but only surviving son of Rev Walter Waddington Shirley (d. 1866) and his wife Philippa Knight. He was born at Christ Church, Oxford where his father was Regius Professor of Ecclesiastical History and canon.

He was educated at Winchester College and matriculated in 1883 at New College, Oxford, where he received a BA in 1887.

== Career ==
Ferrers entered the profession of architecture and was articled to Basil Champneys. Part of the Arts and Crafts Movement, he was an active member of the Society for the Protection of Ancient Buildings and the Art Workers Guild, being elected Master in 1918. He designed a large addition to 35 Victoria Road, Kensington in 1896. His obituary described him as "a most conscientious architect...over-exacting, if anything, in his own work".

In 1912, Ferrers succeeded his childless fourth cousin Sewallis Shirley, 10th Earl Ferrers in the earldom, and largely retired from architecture to tend the family estates.

== Marriage and children ==
On 9 July 1890 Ferrers married Mary Jane Moon (d. 10 Jan 1944), daughter of the barrister Robert Moon and the sister of Edward Robert Pacy Moon. They had had five children:

- Lady Margery Joan Shirley (25 November 1891 – 1 June 1952), married Lancelot Sackville Fletcher on 22 September 1920
- Elizabeth Mary Shirley (30 December 1892 – 9 November 1893)
- Robert Walter Shirley, 12th Earl Ferrers (1894–1954)
- Lady Phillida Shirley (4 November 1896 – 26 December 1985), under the name of Sister Mary Phillida a recluse at the Anglican shrine to Our Lady of Walsingham
- Hon Andrew Shirley (29 December 1900 – 20 June 1958), married Ethel Muriel Lewis on 30 April 1927 and had issue, art historian

== Death ==
Lord Ferrers died at the family seat, Staunton Harold Hall, in 1937 at the age of 72 and was succeeded in the earldom by his elder son, Robert.

Peerage of Great Britain
Preceded by Sewallis Shirley	Earl Ferrers; 1912–1937	Succeeded by Robert Shirley
