= Thomas Shirley (died 1544) =

English politician

Thomas Shirley (by 1489–1544), of West Grinstead, Sussex, was an English politician.

== Family ==
His brother, Richard Shirley, was an MP for Sussex. He married Elizabeth Gorges and they had four daughters and two sons, including Francis Shirley MP.

== Career ==
He was a Member (MP) of the Parliament of England for Steyning in 1529.

Parliament of England
Preceded by Unknown; Unknown	Member of Parliament for Steyning; 1529; With: John Morris	Succeeded by Unknown; Unknown
