= Walter Shirley (priest and historian) =

English churchman and ecclesiastical historian

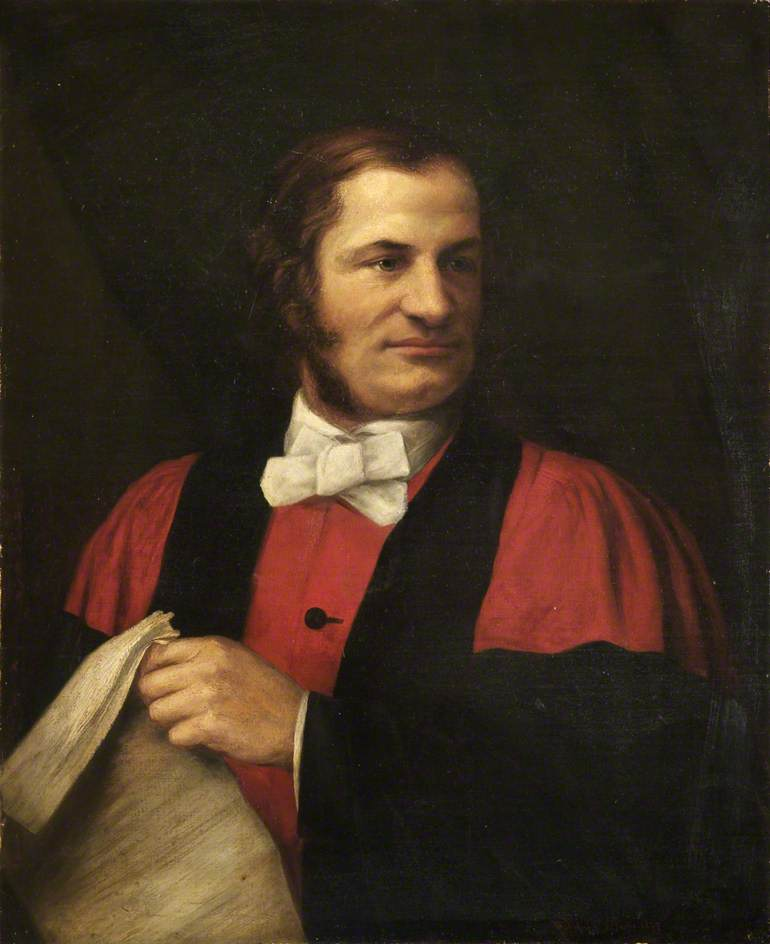
Prof. Walter Waddington Shirley

Prof. Rev. Walter Waddington Shirley (1828–1866) was an English churchman and ecclesiastical historian.

== Life ==
The only son of Walter Augustus Shirley, bishop of Sodor and Man, he was born at Shirley, Derbyshire, on 24 July 1828. In 1837 he became pupil no. 2, second only to the headmaster's son, at Lieutenant C.R. Malden's preparatory school (now known as Windlesham House School) founded in that year at Newport, Isle of Wight. He left in 1839 for Rugby School under Thomas Arnold. His closest friend at Rugby and throughout his life was his cousin, William Henry Waddington, later in French politics.

In June 1846 Shirley matriculated at University College, Oxford, but in the following year he migrated to Wadham College, where he had gained a scholarship and became president of the Oxford Union. He obtained a first class in the honour school of mathematics in 1851, and in 1852 was elected a Fellow of his college. He had to vacate his fellowship three years later, on his mother's death, when he inherited a small landed property. From 1855 to 1863 he was tutor and mathematical lecturer of Wadham. It was during this period that he began historical study.

His theological views underwent considerable change; the position which Shirley occupied at the time of his death was still a provisional one. Having been in his early days a disciple of Arnold, he ultimately came to regard ‘undogmatic Christianity’ as a contradiction in terms. In May 1863, he preached in the university church a sermon on the unreasonableness of Arnold's teaching. Later that year he was made regius professor of ecclesiastical history and canon of Christ Church, Oxford. He was one of the pioneers of the university extension movement, and played a part in the founding of Keble College. His career was cut short at the age of thirty-eight. He died on 20 November 1866.

== Works ==
In 1858 his edition of Fasciculi Zizaniorum Magistri Johannis Wyclif was published in the Rolls Series. He began a life of John Wiclif, which he did not live to complete, though in 1865 he published ‘Catalogue of the Original Works of John Wiclif,’ Oxford. In 1862 he edited for the Rolls Series ‘Royal and other Historical Letters illustrative of the Reign of Henry III.’

He also published a lecture on ‘Scholasticism,’ delivered before the university of Oxford, 1866. After his death a small volume by him, entitled ‘Some Account of the Church in the Apostolic Age,’ was published by the Clarendon Press.

== Family ==
By his wife Philippa, daughter of Samuel Knight of Impington, Cambridgeshire, whom he married on 4 July 1855, Shirley had five children:

- Alice Shirley (17 June 1856 – 18 January 1911), married Rev. William Richardson Linton
- Lady Mary Philippa Shirley (28 December 1857 – 9 September 1917)
- Walter Sewallis Shirley (13 October 1859 – 21 January 1861)
- Lady Laeta Shirley (29 June 1861 – 27 November 1928)
- Walter Shirley, 11th Earl Ferrers (1864–1937)
- Hon. Ralph Shirley (30 December 1865 – 29 December 1946), occultist

== See also ==
- Knighton's Chronicon
