= Washington Shirley, 9th Earl Ferrers =

British nobleman

The Right Honourable Washington Shirley
- Earl Ferrers
- Coat of arms
- Tenure: 1842–1859
- Predecessor: Washington Shirley, 8th Earl Ferrers
- Successor: Sewallis Shirley, 10th Earl Ferrers
- Born: 3 January 1822
- Died: 13 March 1859 (aged 37); Staunton Harold Hall
- Buried: Staunton Harold Hall
- Spouse: Lady Augusta Annabella Chichester (m. 1844)
- Issue: 5, including: Sewallis Shirley, 10th Earl Ferrers; Lady Amelia Shirley; Lady Augusta Shirley; Hon. Devereux Shirley

Washington Sewallis Shirley, 9th Earl Ferrers (3 January 1822 – 13 March 1859), styled The Honourable Washington Shirley from 1827 to 1830 and Viscount Tamworth from 1830 to 1842, was a British hereditary peer.

== Early life and education ==
Ferrers was the elder son of Robert William Shirley, Viscount Tamworth and the grandson of Washington Shirley, 8th Earl Ferrers. He became heir apparent to the earldom when his father died in 1830. He was educated at Eton College and succeeded his grandfather in the earldom in 1842.

== Later life ==
On 10 February 1852, Ferrers was appointed a Deputy Lieutenant of Leicestershire, and on 10 January 1857, a Deputy Lieutenant of Staffordshire.

== Marriage and children ==
On 23 July 1844, Ferrers married Lady Augusta Annabella Chichester, daughter of Edward Chichester, 4th Marquess of Donegall, at St George's, Hanover Square. They had five children:

- a stillborn son (16 July 1845)
- Sewallis Edward Shirley, 10th Earl Ferrers (1847–1912)
- Lady Amelia Anne Shirley (1 December 1848 – 6 September 1849)
- Lady Augusta Amelia Shirley (25 December 1849 – 10 February 1933), married Sir Archdale Palmer, 4th Baronet on 19 August 1873
- Hon Devereux Hugh Lupus Shirley (16 July 1853 – 22 February 1854)

== Death ==
Lord Ferrers died at Staunton Harold Hall in March 1859 at the age of 37 and was buried there. He was succeeded in the earldom by his eldest son Sewallis.

Peerage of Great Britain
Preceded by Washington Shirley	Earl Ferrers; 1842–1859	Succeeded by Sewallis Shirley
