= Robert Shirley, 6th Earl Ferrers =

British nobleman

A Philosopher Lecturing on the Orrery
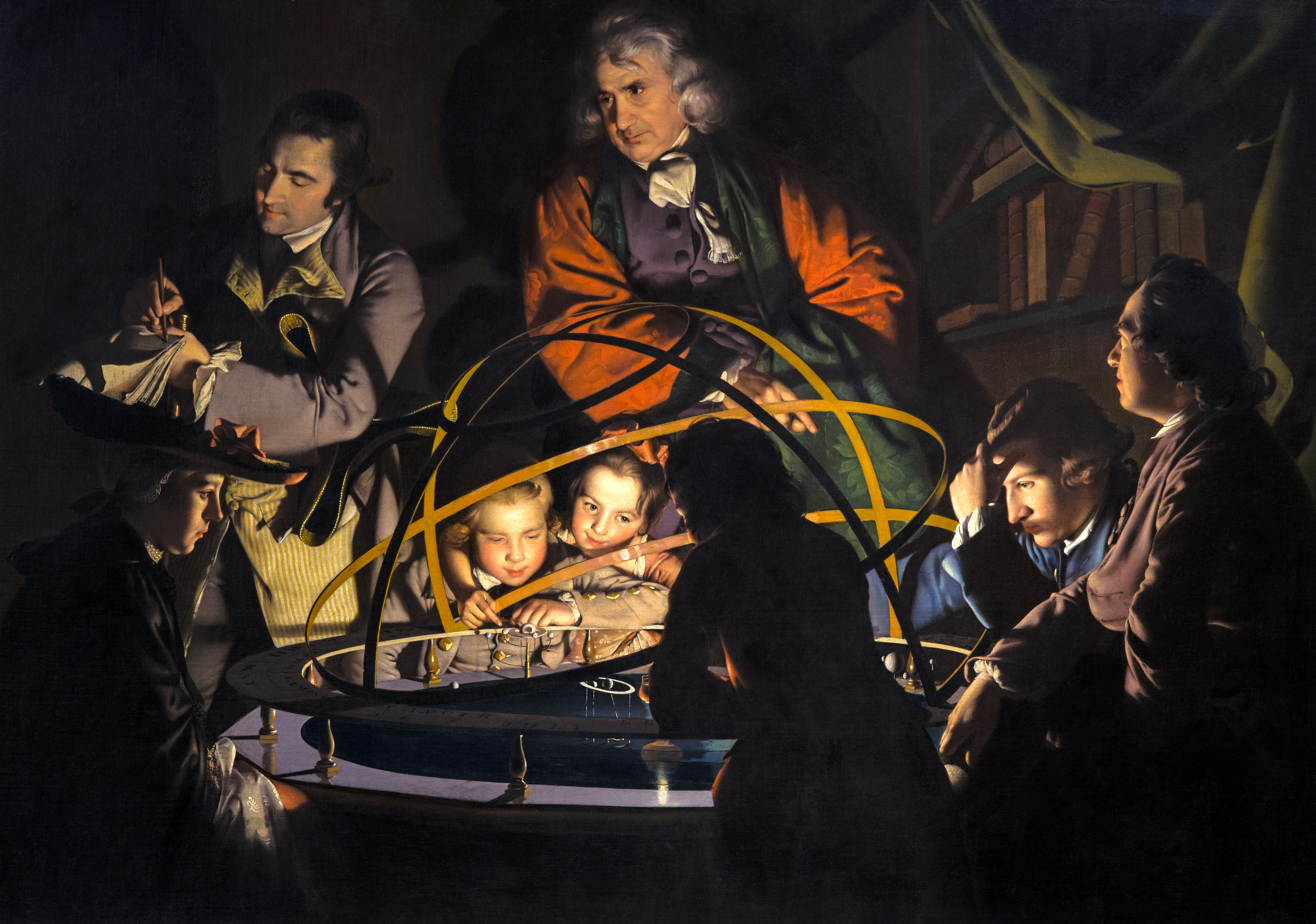
- Artist: Joseph Wright of Derby
- Year: c. 1766
- Medium: Oil on canvas
- Dimensions: 1473 mm × 2032 mm (58 in × 80 in)
- Location: Derby Museum and Art Gallery, Derby, England

Robert Shirley, 6th Earl Ferrers (20 July 1723 – 18 April 1787) was a British Hereditary peer.

== Early life ==
Ferrers was born in 1723 in St James, Westminster, the third son of Hon Laurence Shirley and grandson of Robert Shirley, 1st Earl Ferrers.

== Marriage and children ==
On 26 December 1754, Ferrers married Catherine Cotton (d. 26 March 1786), with whom he had three children:

- Robert Shirley, 7th Earl Ferrers (21 September 1756 – 2 May 1827)
- Lawrence Rowland Ferrers (1757 – 5 February 1773), who appears as a youth in Joseph Wright's painting, "A Philosopher Lecturing on the Orrery"
- Washington Shirley, 8th Earl Ferrers (13 November 1760 – 2 October 1842)

== Later life ==
In 1778, Ferrers succeeded his childless elder brother, Vice-Admiral Washington Shirley, 5th Earl Ferrers, in the earldom.

On 4 July 1781, he was created a Deputy Lieutenant of Derbyshire.

== Death ==
Lord Ferrers died in his house in London in 1787 at the age of 63 and was buried with his wife at Breedon on the Hill. He was succeeded in the earldom by his eldest son, Robert.

Peerage of Great Britain
Preceded by Washington Shirley	Earl Ferrers; 1778–1787	Succeeded by Robert Shirley
