= Robert Shirley, 7th Earl Ferrers =

British nobleman

The Right Honourable Robert Shirley FSA DL
- Earl Ferrers
- Coat of arms
- Tenure: 1787–1827
- Predecessor: Robert Shirley, 6th Earl Ferrers
- Successor: Washington Shirley, 8th Earl Ferrers
- Born: 21 September 1756
- Died: 2 May 1827 (aged 70); Hastings
- Spouses: Elizabeth Prentiss (m. 1778; died 1799) Elizabeth Mundy (m. 1799; died 1827)
- Issue: Robert Shirley, Viscount Tamworth
- Father: Robert Shirley, 6th Earl Ferrers
- Mother: Catherine Cotton

Robert Shirley, 7th Earl Ferrers FSA DL (21 September 1756 – 2 May 1827), styled Viscount Tamworth from 1778 to 1787, was a British hereditary peer.

== Early life ==
Ferrers was the eldest son of Robert Shirley, 6th Earl Ferrers and his wife Catherine Cotton. He was known by the courtesy title Viscount Tamworth after his father succeeded to the earldom in 1778. Ferrers succeeded to the earldom on his father's death in 1787.

== Career ==
On 4 July 1781, he and his father were Deputy Lieutenants for Derbyshire.

Ferrers was named a Fellow of the Society of Antiquaries of London in 1788, and was much interested in genealogy.

== Marriages and children ==
Ferrers married Elizabeth Prentiss (d. 14 September 1799) on 13 March 1778 at St Leonard's, Shoreditch. They had one son:

- Robert Sewallis Shirley, Viscount Tamworth (9 November 1778 - 6 June 1824). Married Hon Sophia Caroline Curzon, daughter of Nathaniel Curzon, 2nd Baron Scarsdale, on 5 August 1800. Purchased a commission as cornet and sub-lieutenant in the 2nd Regiment of Life Guards on 6 October 1798, was promoted into the 1st Regiment of Foot Guards as a lieutenant on 4 November 1800, and retired from the Army in January 1802. Commissioned major of the Derby Regiment of Volunteer Infantry (militia) on 26 April 1804.

Ferrers married his second wife, Elizabeth Mundy (d. 22 February 1827), daughter of Wrightson Mundy, on 28 September 1799. There were no children from this marriage.

== Death ==
Lord Ferrers died at Hastings in May 1827 at the age of 70. As his only son predeceased him without leaving legitimate issue, he was succeeded in the earldom by his brother Washington. The Earl and his second wife were both buried at Breedon on the Hill.

Although his son died without legitimate issue, he left a natural daughter, Caroline Shirley (1818–1897). Ferrers left the family estates at Ragdale and Ratcliffe on the Wreake, Leicestershire, which had descended from the Basset family, to his granddaughter Caroline, later Duchess Sforza Cesarini.

Peerage of Great Britain
Preceded by Robert Shirley	Earl Ferrers; 1787–1827	Succeeded by Washington Shirley
