= Walter Shirley (bishop) =

English bishop

The Right Reverend Walter Augustus Shirley
- Bishop of Sodor and Man
- Diocese: Diocese of Sodor and Man
- In office: 1846–1847 (death)
- Predecessor: Thomas Vowler Short
- Successor: Robert Eden

Personal details
- Born: 30 May 1797 Westport, Ireland
- Died: 21 April 1847 (aged 49) Bishop's Court, Isle of Man
- Denomination: Anglican
- Spouse: Maria Waddington (1827
- Education: Winchester College; New College, Oxford

Walter Augustus Shirley (30 May 1797 – 21 April 1847) was an English bishop who was the Bishop of Sodor and Man.

== Life ==
He was born on 30 May 1797 in Westport, Ireland, where his father held a curacy, the only son of Walter Shirley, by his wife Alicia, daughter of Sir Edward Newenham. His grandfather was Walter Shirley. At the age of nine, Shirley was placed under the care of the Rev. Legh Richmond but was soon moved to a school at Linton in Essex. He became a scholar of Winchester College in 1809, and six years later was elected to a scholarship at New College, Oxford, where he became a Fellow in 1818.

After his ordination on 7 August 1820, he took charge of the parish of Woodford, Northamptonshire, one of the livings held by his father. In 1821 he became curate of Parwich in Derbyshire. In 1822 he was appointed assistant lecturer of Ashbourne and curate of Atlow and was awarded the prize for the English essay at Oxford, the subject being the Study of Moral Evidence.

He acted as chaplain at Rome in the winter of 1826–7, and during his residence there he became intimately acquainted with Christian Karl Josias von Bunsen and Thomas Erskine, as well as with Charles Lock Eastlake and David Wilkie. In the autumn of 1827 he was married at Paris to Maria, daughter of William Waddington, and at the same time, his father resigned the living of St Michael's Church, Shirley in his favour. He took possession of his new home in January 1828. After nine years' residence at Shirley, he accepted the living of Whiston, near Rotherham, which he held jointly with Shirley. He gave up the former cure two years later when he was appointed to the incumbency of Brailsford, a parish adjoining that of Shirley. In 1829 he alienated some of his friends by his outspoken advocacy of Catholic emancipation; in later years he estranged others by refusing to support measures against the Tractarians. His own upbringing and views were evangelical.

He was made Archdeacon of Derby by the bishop of Lichfield on 21 December 1840. In November 1846 he was appointed Bishop of Sodor and Man by Lord John Russell; but because of a serious illness, he was not consecrated until 10 January 1847. He had been elected Bampton lecturer for that year but lived only long enough to deliver two of the lectures of his course. He died at Bishop's Court, Isle of Man, on 21 April 1847. His only son was Walter Waddington Shirley.

Among his pupils were Stafford Henry Northcote and his nephew, William Henry Waddington, the French minister.

== Works ==
In addition to his Oxford prize essay, Shirley published A Charge to the Clergy of the Archdeaconry of Derby, 1846. The two Bampton lectures that he had delivered, together with two others which he had completed before death overtook him, were published in 1847 under the title of The Supremacy of the Holy Scriptures.

Church of England titles
| Preceded by Thomas Vowler Short | Bishop of Sodor and Man; 1846–1847 | Succeeded by Robert Eden |
