= Robert Shirley, 12th Earl Ferrers =

British Conservative politician

The Right Honourable The Earl Ferrers
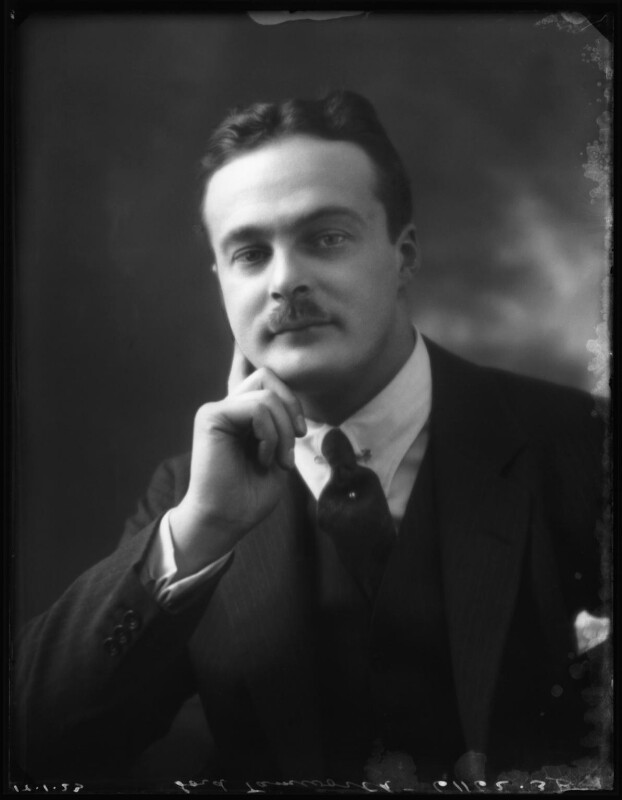
- Shirley in 1923

Member of the House of Lords
- Lord Temporal
- In office 1937 – 11 October 1954
- Preceded by: Walter Knight Shirley
- Succeeded by: Robert Washington Shirley

Personal details
- Born: Robert Walter Shirley; 7 July 1894
- Died: 11 October 1954 (aged 60)
- Party: Conservative
- Spouse: Hermione Justice Morley (m. 1922)
- Children: Robert Shirley, 13th Earl Ferrers
- Parent(s): Walter Shirley, 11th Earl Ferrers; Mary Jane Moon

Robert Walter Shirley, 12th Earl Ferrers (7 July 1894 – 11 October 1954), was a British Conservative politician and hereditary peer.

== Early life and education ==
Lord Ferrers was born in 1894, the elder son Walter Shirley, 11th Earl Ferrers and his wife Mary Jane Moon. He succeeded to the earldom and became a member of the House of Lords upon the death of his father in 1937.

== Marriage and children ==
Lord Ferrers married Hermione Justice Morley on 28 February 1922. They had three children:

- Lady Elizabeth Hermione Shirley (1923 - 7 October 1997)
- Lady Jane Penelope Justice Shirley (1925 - 14 May 2020)
- Robert Washington Shirley, 13th Earl Ferrers (8 June 1929 - 13 November 2012)

== Death ==
Lord Ferrers died on 11 October 1954 at the age of 60. He was succeeded in the earldom by his only son, Robert.

Peerage of Great Britain
Preceded by Walter Knight Shirley	Earl Ferrers; 1937–1954	Succeeded by Robert Washington Shirley
