= Staunton Harold =

Civil parish in Leicestershire, England

Coordinates: 52.784°N 1.440°W

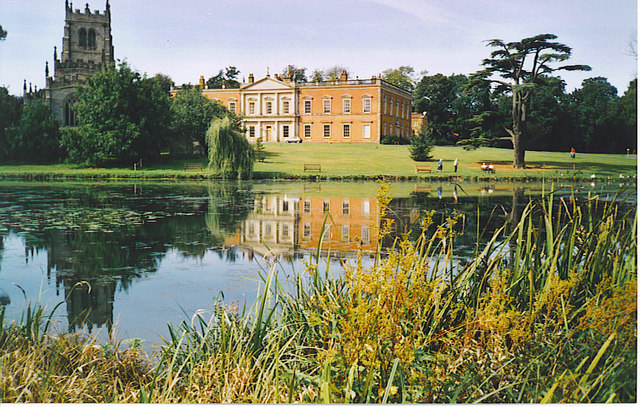
- Staunton Harold Hall, with the tower of Holy Trinity Chapel on the left and the lake in the foreground

- Location within Leicestershire
- Population: 141 (2011 Census)
- OS grid reference: SK3720
- Civil parish: Staunton Harold
- District: North West Leicestershire
- Shire county: Leicestershire
- Region: East Midlands
- Country: England
- Sovereign state: United Kingdom
- Post town: Ashby-de-la-Zouch
- Postcode district: LE65
- Dialling code: 01332
- Police: Leicestershire
- Fire: Leicestershire
- Ambulance: East Midlands
- UK Parliament: North West Leicestershire
- Website: Staunton Harold Parish Meeting

Staunton Harold is a civil parish in North West Leicestershire about 3 miles (5 km) north of Ashby-de-la-Zouch. The parish is on the county boundary with Derbyshire and about 9 miles (14 km) south of Derby. The 2011 Census (including Lount) recorded the parish's population as 141.

A brook flows from the south through the parish, heading for the River Trent which it joins about 4 miles (6.4 km) to the north. In the parish the brook is dammed to form a pair of small lakes. Nikolaus Pevsner (later Sir Nikolaus) described the view westwards across the lakes to Staunton Harold Hall and Holy Trinity parish church as "unsurpassed in the country – certainly as far as Englishness is concerned".

Downstream from Staunton Harold, just over 1 mile (1.6 km) over the boundary in Derbyshire, the brook is dammed again to form Staunton Harold Reservoir. Most of the reservoir is in the Derbyshire parish of Melbourne, but part of the upper reach of one arm of the reservoir is in Staunton Harold parish.

== History ==
Staunton Harold is mentioned as Stantone in the ancient hundred of Goscote in the Domesday Book of 1086. In 1346 when the wapentake was also called Goscote hundred, it was divided into the hundred of East Goscote and the hundred of West Goscote. Staunton Harold (then in the parish of Breedon) and nearby Ashby-de-la-Zouch were two of the communities that were in West Goscote hundred.

=== Estate and Hall ===
The estate was the seat of the Shirley family beginning about the late 15th century. George Shirley (1559–1622) was created 1st Baronet in 1611. Sir Robert Shirley, 5th Baronet (1650–1717) was created 14th Baron Ferrers of Chartley in 1677 and 1st Earl Ferrers in 1711.

Staunton Harold Hall is a country house that was originally Jacobean, but the 13th Baron had it enlarged in about 1700. Washington Shirley, 5th Earl Ferrers had the present Palladian east front added in 1763. It is of two storeys and eleven bays, eight of which are red brick. The three central bays are ashlar and pedimented, with engaged columns of two orders: Tuscan on the ground floor and Ionic on the first floor.

=== Holy Trinity Chapel ===
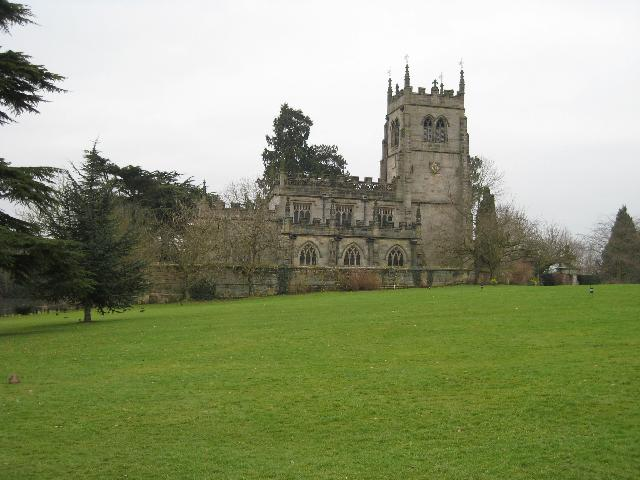
Holy Trinity Chapel seen from the north

By AD 1122 the Augustinian Priory of Breedon on the Hill had a dependent chapelry at Staunton. Breedon was a house of Nostell Priory, which surrendered all its properties to the Crown in 1539 in the Dissolution of the Monasteries.

Sir Robert Shirley, 4th Baronet had the present Church of England chapel of the Holy Trinity built in 1653. It is unusual for being built during the Commonwealth era and a notable example of Gothic survival architecture. Two inscriptions commemorate Sir Robert's efforts. One is in the chancel and reads Sir Robert Shirley Baronet Founder of this church anno domini 1653 on whose soul God hath mercy. The other is over the entrance and reads

When all things sacred were throughout ye nation Either demollisht or profaned Sir Robert Shirley Barronet founded this Church whose singular praise it is to have done ye best things in ye worst times And hoped them in the most callamitous. The righteous shall be had in everlasting remembrance.

Sir Robert did not manage to have the chapel completed: the Commonwealth authorities imprisoned him in the Tower of London and he died there in 1656. After the Restoration of the Monarchy Richard Shepheard completed the chapel in 1665 for the young Sir Seymour Shirley, 5th Baronet (1647–67).

The exterior of the chapel is substantially buttressed, battlemented and pinnacled. The nave has a clerestory with square-headed Perpendicular Gothic windows. It is flanked by north and south aisles with windows of an earlier 14th century style and arcades of three bays. Although the architecture is Gothic the furnishings are Jacobean, including extensive panelling, box pews, the pulpit and a west gallery with an organ that predates the chapel. In the chancel is a monument with the white marble semi-reclining figure of Robert Shirley, Viscount Tamworth, who died in 1714.

The west tower is of three stages divided by string courses and has a ring of eight bells. George I Oldfield of Nottingham cast the fourth, fifth and sixth bells in 1669 and Immanuel Halton of South Wingfield, Derbyshire cast the third in 1717. Thomas I Mears of the Whitechapel Bell Foundry cast the treble, second, seventh and tenor bells in 1831. For technical reasons the bells are currently unringable.

In 1953 John Betjeman, later Sir John Betjeman, recorded on gramophone records, a talk broadcast by BBC Radio on 30 December 1953. It celebrated the Tercentenary of the founding of the Church. While extolling the beauty of the Church and praising the "Catholic and reformed " Church of England he railed a little against Oliver Cromwell and the Puritans.

Staunton Harold is part of the Benefice of the Church of St Mary and St Hardulph, Breedon on the Hill. Holy Trinity is now a redundant church and a property of the National Trust.

== Sources ==
- McKinley, R.A. (1954). "Houses of Augustinian canons: The priory of Breedon". In Hoskins, W.G. (ed.). A History of the County of Leicestershire. Victoria County History. Vol. 2. London: Oxford University Press for the University of London Institute of Historical Research. pp. 8–10.
- Pevsner, Nikolaus (1960). Leicestershire and Rutland. The Buildings of England. Harmondsworth: Penguin Books. pp. 238–341.
