= Washington Shirley, 5th Earl Ferrers =

British Royal Navy officer, peer, freemason and amateur astronomer

Vice-Admiral The Right Honourable The Earl Ferrers FRS
- Born: 26 May 1722
- Died: 1 October 1778 (aged 56); Chartley Manor Place, Staffordshire
- Burial place: Staunton Harold, Leicestershire
- Spouse: Anne Elliot
- Military career
- Allegiance: Kingdom of Great Britain
- Branch: Royal Navy
- Service years: 1735–1778
- Rank: Vice-Admiral of the White
- Commands: HMS Hawk; HMS Fox; HMS Dover; HMS Gloucester; HMS Fame; HMS Bridgewater; HMS Mermaid; HMS Monmouth; HMS Duc d'Aquitaine; HMS Temple
- Conflicts: Seven Years' War: Battle of Fort Beauséjour; Raid on St Malo; Battle of Quiberon Bay
- Awards: Fellow of the Royal Society

Vice-Admiral Washington Shirley, 5th Earl Ferrers, FRS (26 May 1722 – 1 October 1778) was a British Royal Navy officer, hereditary peer, freemason and amateur astronomer.

== Early life ==
Ferrers was the second son of Hon Laurence Shirley (fourth son of Robert Shirley, 1st Earl Ferrers) and his wife, Anne.

Two weeks after the execution of his brother Laurence Shirley, 4th Earl Ferrers in 1760, Ferrers took his seat in the House of Lords as the 5th Earl Ferrers. In 1763, King George III granted him the family estates, previously forfeit by his brother as a felon (much to the surprise of Casanova, then visiting London) and he began to transform the family seat of Staunton Harold in Leicestershire.

== Naval career ==
In about 1738 he joined the Royal Navy and rose through the ranks as a second lieutenant in 1741, first lieutenant in 1746 and post-captain soon after. He was later promoted as a rear admiral in 1771 and vice-admiral in 1775.

== Later life ==
Ferrers was appointed a deputy lieutenant of Staffordshire on 28 August 1761.

Due to persistent financial problems, he sold the estates of Astwell (including Astwell Castle) and Falcutt to Richard Grenville-Temple, 2nd Earl Temple between 1774 and 1777.

Ferrers was keen on astronomy and owned his own orrery. In 1761 he was elected a Fellow of the Royal Society (FRS) for his work on the observations of the transit of Venus. Ferrers purchased Joseph Wright of Derby's painting entitled "A Philosopher giving a Lecture on the Orrery in which a lamp is put in place of the Sun". He has been credited as being the figure on the right. Ferrers had Peter Perez Burdett (the figure on the left) as a house guest and he had attended a talk by James Ferguson who had given lectures on the orrery.

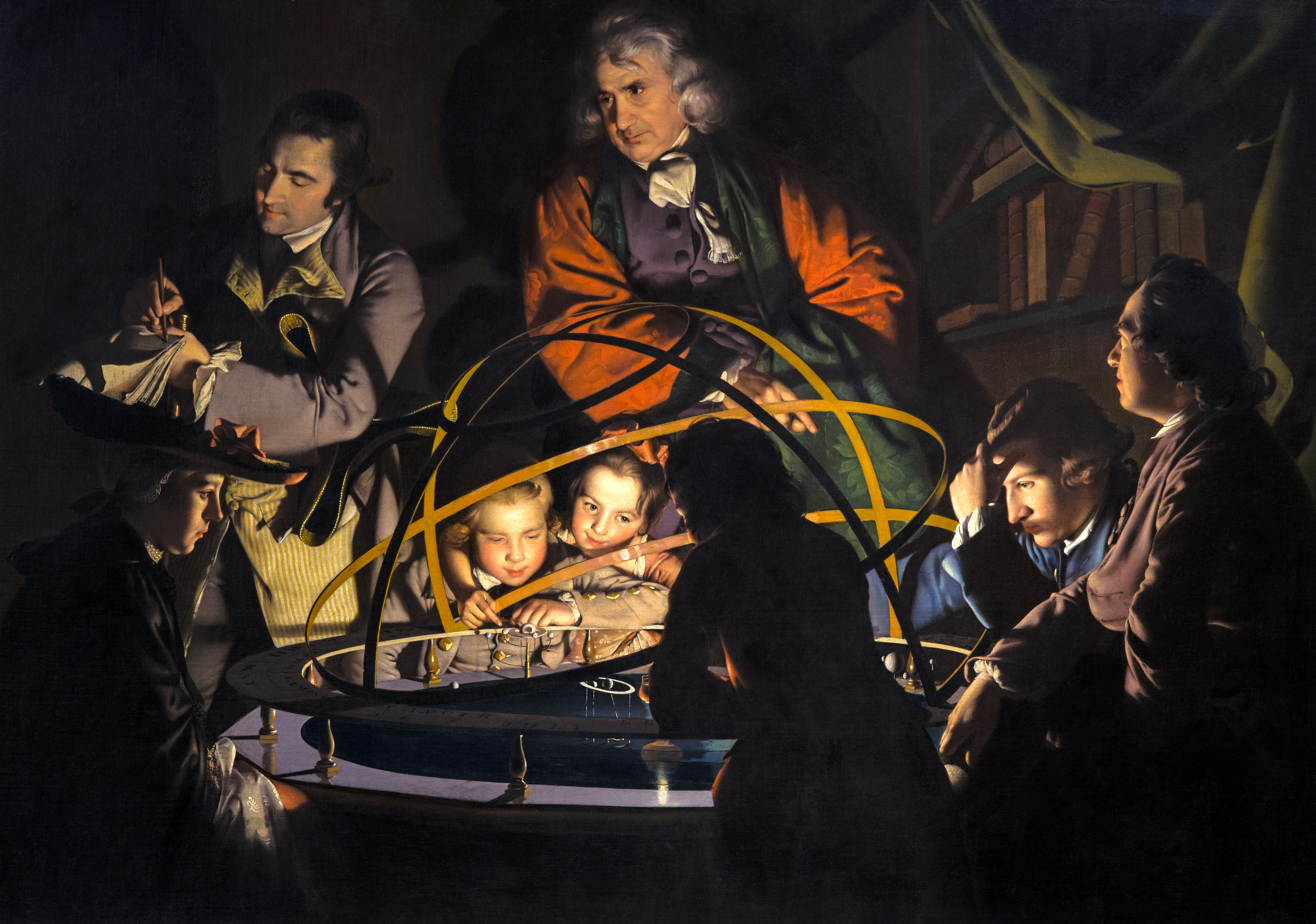
A Philosopher Lecturing on the Orrery by Joseph Wright of Derby. Use a cursor to see who is who.

== Death ==
Lord Ferrers died in 1778 at Chartley Manor Place, Staffordshire at the age of 56 and was buried at Staunton Harold. He and his wife, Anne Elliot, had no children and the earldom and estates therefore passed to his younger brother, Robert.

Masonic offices
Preceded by Lord Aberdour	Grand Master of the Premier Grand Lodge of England; 1762–1764	Succeeded by The Lord Blayney
Peerage of Great Britain
Preceded by Laurence Shirley	Earl Ferrers; 1760–1778	Succeeded by Robert Shirley
