= Sewallis Shirley, 10th Earl Ferrers =

The Right Honourable Sewallis Shirley KStJ
- Earl Ferrers
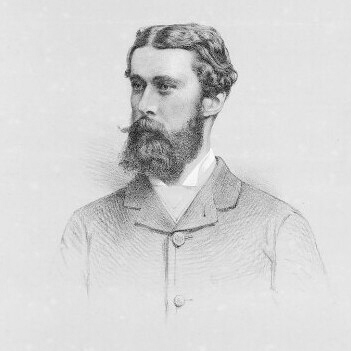

- Coat of arms
- Tenure: 1859–1912
- Predecessor: Washington Shirley, 9th Earl Ferrers
- Successor: Walter Shirley, 11th Earl Ferrers
- Born: 24 January 1847
- Died: 26 July 1912 (aged 65)
- Spouse: Lady Ina Hedges-White (m. 1885; died 1907)
- Father: Washington Shirley, 9th Earl Ferrers
- Mother: Lady Augusta Annabella Chichester

Sewallis Edward Shirley, 10th Earl Ferrers KStJ (24 January 1847 – 26 July 1912), styled Viscount Tamworth until 1859, was a British hereditary peer.

== Early life and education ==
Ferrers was the elder son of Washington Sewallis Shirley, 9th Earl Ferrers and Lady Augusta Annabella Chichester, a daughter of Edward Chichester, 4th Marquess of Donegall. He was educated at Trinity College, Cambridge, where he took a BA in 1867 and an MA in 1871.

== Career ==
Ferrers was appointed a Deputy Lieutenant of Derbyshire and, on 8 February 1869, of Staffordshire. Ferrers was also commissioned as a lieutenant in the Staffordshire Yeomanry cavalry on 8 February 1868. He resigned his commission in 1871.

He was appointed a Knight of the Most Venerable Order of the Hospital of St. John of Jerusalem (K.St.J.) and was Justice of the Peace (J.P.) for Derbyshire.

== Marriage ==
On 24 October 1885, at St George's, Hanover Square, Ferrers married Lady Ina Maude Hedges-White, daughter of William Hedges-White, 3rd Earl of Bantry and Jane Herbert. The marriage was childless.

== Death ==
Lord Ferrers died in July 1912 at the age of 65. He was succeeded in the earldom by his fourth cousin Walter Shirley.

Peerage of Great Britain
Preceded by Washington Shirley	Earl Ferrers; 1859–1912	Succeeded by Walter Shirley
