= Baron O'Neill =

Barony in the Peerage of the United Kingdom

- Blazon: Arms: Quarterly: 1st and 4th, per fess wavy the chief Argent and the base representing Waves of the Sea in chief a Dexter Hand couped at the wrist Gules in base a Salmon naiant proper (O'Neill); 2nd and 3rd, checky Or and Gules a Chief Vair (Chichester).; Crests: 1st: an Arm embowed in Armour the Hand grasping a Sword all proper; 2nd: a Stork rising with a Snake in its beak all proper.; Supporters: On either side a Lion Gules gorged with an Antique Crown Argent pendant therefrom an Escutcheon the dexter charged with the Arms of O'Neill and the sinister with those of Chichester; Coronet: That of a Baron.
- Creation date: 18 April 1868
- Created by: Queen Victoria
- Peerage: Peerage of the United Kingdom
- First holder: William O'Neill, 1st Baron O'Neill
- Present holder: Raymond O'Neill, 4th Baron O'Neill
- Heir apparent: Shane Sebastian Clanaboy O'Neill
- Status: Extant
- Seat: Shane's Castle
- Motto: Above the Crests: INVITUM SEQUITUR HONOS (Honours follow us without seeking); Below the shield: LAMH DEARG EIRIN (The Red Hand of Ireland)

Baron O'Neill, of Shane's Castle in the County of Antrim, is a title in the Peerage of the United Kingdom. It was created in 1868 for the musical composer The Reverend William O'Neill. Born William Chichester, he succeeded to the estates of his cousin John Bruce Richard O'Neill, 3rd Viscount O'Neill, in 1855 (on whose death the viscountcy and first barony of O'Neill became extinct) and assumed by royal licence the surname of O'Neill in lieu of Chichester in order to inherit the lands of his cousin, despite not being descended in the male line from an O'Neill. The Chichesters trace their lineage to the name O'Neill through Mary Chichester, daughter of Henry O'Neill of Shane's Castle. Lord O'Neill was the patrilineal great-great-great-grandson of John Chichester, younger brother of the 2nd Earl of Donegall. The latter two were both nephews of the 1st Earl of Donegall, and grandsons of the 1st Viscount Chichester (see the Marquess of Donegall for more information). Lord O'Neill was succeeded by his eldest son, the second Baron. He sat as a Conservative Member of Parliament for Antrim.

His eldest son and heir apparent, the Hon. Arthur O'Neill, represented Antrim Mid in the House of Commons as a Conservative from 1910 until 1914, when he was killed in action during the First World War, the first MP to die in the conflict. The second Baron was therefore succeeded by his grandson, Shane O'Neill, 3rd Baron O'Neill (the son of the Hon. Arthur O'Neill). He was killed in action in Italy during the Second World War. The title is currently held by his son, the fourth Baron, who succeeded in 1944. He was Lord Lieutenant of Antrim from 1994 to 2008.

Two other members of the O'Neill family have been elevated to the peerage. The 1st Baron Rathcavan was the youngest son of the second Baron O'Neill, while the Baron O'Neill of the Maine, Prime Minister of Northern Ireland, was the youngest brother of the third Baron.

The holders of the O'Neill and Rathcavan baronies are in the remainder of the titles Earl of Donegall, Viscount Chichester and Baron Chichester, though the chances of that happening are very slim.

The family seat is Shane's Castle, near Randalstown, County Antrim.

== Baron O'Neill (1868) ==
- William O'Neill, 1st Baron O'Neill (1813–1883)
- Edward O'Neill, 2nd Baron O'Neill (1839–1928)
- Shane Edward Robert O'Neill, 3rd Baron O'Neill (1907–1944)
- Raymond Arthur Clanaboy O'Neill, 4th Baron O'Neill (born 1933)

The heir apparent is the present holder's son, the Hon. Shane Sebastian Clanaboy O'Neill (born 1965).

=== Title succession chart ===
Chichester and O'Neill family tree, including: Barons Chichester, Templemore, O'Neill and Rathcavan, Viscounts Chichester, Earls of Donegall, and Marquesses of Donegall

John Chichester d. 1569
Baron Chichester (1st creation), 1613	Viscount Chichester and Baron Chichester (2nd creation), 1625
Arthur Chichester; 1563–1625; Baron Chichester	Edward Chichester; 1568–1648; 1st Viscount Chichester, etc.
Barony chichester (1st creation) extinct, 1625
Earl of Donegall, 1647
Arthur Chichester; 1606–1675; 1st Earl of Donegall, etc.	John Chichester; 1609–1647
Williaṃ Chichester d. 1660	Arthur Chichester d. 1678; 2nd Earl of Donegall, etc.	John Chichester
Arthur Chichester; 1666–1706; 3rd Earl of Donegall, etc.	Rev. William Chichester
Arthur Chichester; 1695–1757; 4th Earl of Donegall, etc.	John Chichester; 1700–1746	Arthur Chichester
Baron Fisherwick, 1790 (GB); Marquess of Donegall and Earl of Belfast, 1791
Arthur Chichester; 1739–1799; 1st Marquess of Donegall, etc., 5th Earl of Donegall, etc.	Rev. William Chichester d. 1815
Chichester baronetcy (UK), 1821
George Chichester; 1769–1844; 2nd Marquess of Donegall, etc., 6th Earl of Donegall, etc.	Arthur Chichester; 1771–1788	Spencer Chichester; 1775–1819	Arthur Chichester; 1st Baronet c. 1769–1847	Edward Chichester d. 1840
Baronetcy extinct
Baron Ennishowen and Carrickfergus (UK) 1841	Baron Templemore (UK), 1831	Baron O'Neill (UK), 1868
George Chichester; 1797–1883; 3rd Marquess of Donegall, etc., 7th Earl of Donegall, etc.	Edward Chichester; 1799–1889; 4th Marquess of Donegall, etc., 8th Earl of Donegall, etc.	Spencer Chichester; 1805–1825	Arthur Chichester; 1808–1840	Haṃilton Chichester; 1810–1854	John Chichester; 1811–1873	Stephen Chichester; 1814–1890	Arthur Chichester; 1797–1837; 1st Baron Templemore	William (Chichester) O'Neill; 1813–1883; 1st Baron O'Neill
Ennishowen and Carrickfergus barony extinct, 1883
George Chichester styled Viscount Chichester; 1826–1827	Frederick Chichester styled Earl of Belfast; 1827–1853	George Chichester; 1822–1904; 5th Marquess of Donegall, etc., 9th Earl of Donegall, etc.	Henry Chichester; 1834–1928	Adolphus Chichester; 1836–1901	Harry Chichester; 1821–1906; 2nd Baron Templemore	Edward O'Neill; 1839–1928; 2nd Baron O'Neill
Baronet of Cleggan (UK), 1929; Baron Rathcavan (UK), 1953
Severne Chichester; 1861–1951	Forester Chichester; 1864–1865	Robert Chichester; 1873–1921	Augustus Chichester; 1878–1902	Arthur Chichester; 1854–1924; 3rd Baron Templemore	Arthur O'Neill; 1876–1914	Hugh O'Neill; 1883–1982; 1st Baron Rathcavan, etc.
Edward Chichester; 1903–1975; 6th Marquess of Donegall, etc., 10th Earl of Donegall, etc.	Robert Chichester; 1902–1920	Arthur Chichester; 1880–1953; 4th Baron Templemore	Shane O'Neill; 1907–1944; 3rd Baron O'Neill	Phelim O'Neill; 1909–1994; 2nd Baron Rathcavan, etc.
Titles inherited by the 5th Baron Templemore
Arthur Chichester; 1914–1942	Dermot Chichester; 1916–2007; 7th Marquess of Donegall, etc. 11th Earl of Donegall, etc., 5th Baron Templemore	Raymond O'Neill b. 1933; 4th Baron O'Neill	Hugh O'Neill; 1939–2025; 3rd Baron Rathcavan, etc.
Patrick Chichester b. 1952; 8th Marquess of Donegall, etc., 12th Earl of Donegall, etc., 6th Baron Templemore	Shane O'Neill b. 1965	François O'Neill b. 1984; 4th Baron Rathcavan, etc.
James Chichester styled Earl of Belfast b. 1990	Con O'Neill b. 2000	Tyrone O'Neill b. 2023

== See also ==
- Marquess of Donegall
- Earl O'Neill
- Baron Rathcavan
- Baron O'Neill of the Maine
- Robert Torrens O'Neill
- O'Neill dynasty
