= Baron Rathcavan =

Barony in the Peerage of the United Kingdom

Baron Rathcavan, of The Braid in the County of Antrim, is a title in the Peerage of the United Kingdom. It was created on 11 February 1953 for the Unionist politician Sir Hugh O'Neill, 1st Baronet. He had already been created a baronet, of Cleggan in the County of Antrim, on 17 June 1929 (see O'Neill baronets). O'Neill was the third son of Edward O'Neill, 2nd Baron O'Neill (see the Baron O'Neill for earlier history of the family) and the uncle of the Prime Minister of Northern Ireland Terence O'Neill, Baron O'Neill of the Maine. Lord Rathcavan was also a male-line descendant of Edward Chichester, 1st Viscount Chichester (see the Marquess of Donegall). He was succeeded by his eldest surviving son, the second Baron. He succeeded his father as Unionist Member of Parliament for Antrim in 1952, a seat he held until 1959, and was later a member of the Parliament of Northern Ireland. As of 2025 the titles are held by his grandson, the fourth Baron, who succeeded in 2025.

The Honourable Sir Con O'Neill, second son of the first Baron, was a diplomat. His daughter Onora O'Neill, Baroness O'Neill of Bengarve, is a philosopher.

The family seat is Cleggan Lodge, near Ballymena, County Antrim.

== Barons Rathcavan (1953) ==
- (Robert William) Hugh O'Neill, 1st Baron Rathcavan (1883–1982)
- Phelim Robert Hugh O'Neill, 2nd Baron Rathcavan (1909–1994)
- Hugh Detmar Torrens O'Neill, 3rd Baron Rathcavan (1939–2025)
- François Hugh Nial O'Neill, 4th Baron Rathcavan (born 1984)

The heir apparent is the present holder's eldest son, the Hon. Tyrone Hugh Richard O'Neill (b. 2023).

=== Title succession chart ===
Title succession chart, Barons Chichester (both creations), Templemore, O'Neill and Rathcavan, Viscounts Chichester, Earls of Donegall, and Marquesses of Donegall.

Sir John Chichester died 1569
Baron Chichester (1613)	Baron Chichester; Viscount Chichester (both 1625)
Arthur Chichester; 1st Baron Chichester; 1563–1625	Edward Chichester; 1st Viscount Chichester; 1st Baron Chichester; 1568–1648
1613 barony extinct
Earl of Donegall (1647)
Arthur Chichester; 1st Earl of Donegall; 1606–1675	Lt. Col. John Chichester; 1609–1647
Hon. Williaṃ Chichester died 1660	Arthur Chichester; 2nd Earl of Donegall died 1678	Hon. John Chichester
Arthur Chichester; 3rd Earl of Donegall; 1666–1706	Rev. William Chichester
Arthur Chichester; 4th Earl of Donegall; 1695–1757	Hon. John Chichester; 1700–1746	Rev. Arthur Chichester
Baron Fisherwick (1790, GB); Marquess of Donegall (1791)
Arthur Chichester; 1st Marquess of Donegall; 5th Earl of Donegall; 1739–1799	Rev. William Chichester died 1815
Chichester baronetcy (1821, UK)
George Chichester; 2nd Marquess of Donegall; 1769–1844	Hon. Arthur Chichester; 1771–1788	Lord; Spencer Chichester; 1775–1819	Sir Arthur Chichester; 1st Baronet c. 1769 – 1847	Rev. Edward Chichester died 1840
Baronetcy extinct
Baron Ennishowen and Carrickfergus (1841, UK)	Baron Templemore (1831, UK)	Baron O'Neill (1868, UK)
George Chichester; 3rd Marquess of Donegall; 1797–1883	Edward Chichester; 4th Marquess of Donegall; 1799–1889	Lord; Spencer Chichester; 1805–1825	Lord; Arthur Chichester; 1808–1840	Lord; Haṃilton Chichester; 1810–1854	Lord; John Chichester; 1811–1873	Lord; Stephen Chichester; 1814–1890	Arthur Chichester; 1st Baron Templemore; 1797–1837	William O'Neill; 1st Baron O'Neill (né Chichester); 1813–1883
Ennishowen and Carrickfergus barony extinct
George Chichester; Viscount Chichester; 1826–1827	Frederick Chichester; Earl of Belfast; 1827–1853	George Chichester; 5th Marquess of Donegall; 1822–1904	Lord; Henry Chichester; 1834–1928	Lord; Adolphus Chichester; 1836–1901	Harry Chichester; 2nd Baron Templemore; 1821–1906	Edward O'Neill; 2nd Baron O'Neill; 1839–1928
O'Neill baronetcy (1929, UK); Baron Rathcavan (1953, UK)
Edward Chichester; 6th Marquess of Donegall; 1903–1975	Severne Chichester; 1861–1951	Forester Chichester; 1864–1865	Robert Chichester; 1873–1921	Augustus Chichester; 1878–1902	Arthur Chichester; 3rd Baron Templemore; 1854–1924	William O'Neill; 1874–1882	Capt. Hon. Arthur O'Neill; 1876–1914	Hugh O'Neill; 1st Baron Rathcavan; 1st Baronet; 1883–1982
Titles inherited by the 5th Baron Templemore
Robert Chichester; 1902–1920	Arthur Chichester; 4th Baron Templemore; 1880–1953	Shane O'Neill; 3rd Baron O'Neill; 1907–1944	Phelim O'Neill; 2nd Baron Rathcavan; 1909–1994
Maj. Hon. Arthur Chichester; 1914–1942	Dermot Chichester; 7th Marquess of Donegall; 5th Baron Templemore; 1916–2007	Raymond O'Neill; 4th Baron O'Neill born 1933	Hugh O'Neill; 3rd Baron Rathcavan; 1939–2025
Patrick Chichester; 8th Marquess of Donegall born 1952	Hon. Shane O'Neill born 1965	François O'Neill; 4th Baron Rathcavan born 1984
James Chichester; Earl of Belfast born 1990	Con O'Neill born 2000	Hon. Tyrone O'Neill born 2023

== Arms ==
Coat of arms of Baron Rathcavan
Crest 1st an arm embowed in armour the hand grasping a sword all Proper 2nd a stork rising with a snake in its beak all Proper. Escutcheon Quarterly 1st & 4th per fess wavy the chief Argent and the base representing the waves of the sea in chief a dexter hand couped at the wrist Gules in base a salmon naiant Proper 2nd & 3rd chequy Or and Gules a chief Vair a mullet for difference. Supporters On either side a heron Proper standing on a billet fesswise wavy Argent charged with a bar wavy Azure. Motto Invitum Sequitur Honor; Lamh Dearg Eirin

== See also ==
- Baron O'Neill
- Earl O'Neill
- Baron O'Neill of the Maine
- List of Northern Ireland members of the House of Lords
- Marquess of Donegall
- O'Neill dynasty

== Sources ==
- Kidd, Charles; Williamson, David, eds. (1990). Debrett's Peerage and Baronetage (1990 ed.). New York: St Martin's Press.
- Leigh Rayment's Peerage Pages
