= Baron Templemore =

Title in the Peerage of the United Kingdom

- Arms: Quarterly 1st & 4th, Chequy Or and Gules (for Chichester); 2nd & 3rd, Azure, fretty Argent (for Etchingham). Crest: A Heron wings expanded proper, holding in the beak an Eel Argent. Supporters: Dexter: A Wolf Gules ducally gorged with a Line reflexed over the back Or. Sinister: An Heraldic Tiger Sable, ducally crowned Or.
- Creation date: 10 September 1831
- Created by: King William IV
- Peerage: Peerage of the United Kingdom
- First holder: Arthur, 1st Baron Templemore
- Present holder: Patrick, 8th Marquess of Donegall
- Heir apparent: James, Earl of Belfast
- Status: Extant
- Motto: INVICTUM SEQUITUR HONOR (Unsought honour follows)
- Since 1975 a subsidiary title of the Marquess of Donegall

Baron Templemore, of Templemore in the County of Donegal, is a title in the Peerage of the United Kingdom, since 1975 a subsidiary title of the Marquessate of Donegall. It was created on 10 September 1831 for Arthur Chichester, Member of Parliament for Milborne Port and County Wexford. He was the son of Lord Spencer Stanley Chichester, third son of The 1st Marquess of Donegall (see Marquess of Donegall for earlier history of the Chichester family). Lord Templemore's son, the second Baron, and grandson, the third Baron, both served as Deputy Lieutenants of County Wexford. The latter was succeeded by his eldest son, the fourth Baron. He served as the Government Chief Whip in the House of Lords between 1940 and 1945. He was succeeded by his second but eldest surviving son, the fifth Baron. In 1975 he succeeded his kinsman as seventh Marquess of Donegall. For further history of the titles, see Marquess of Donegall.

Two other members of this branch of the Chichester family may also be mentioned. The Honourable Augustus George Charles Chichester (1822–1896), second son of the first Baron, was a Lieutenant-General in the 77th Foot. The Honourable Sir Gerald Henry Crofton Chichester (1886–1939), second son of the third Baron, was private secretary to Queen Mary between 1935 and 1939.

Despite the geographical designation "Templemore in the County of Donegal", in 1831 the civil parish of Templemore was entirely in County Londonderry rather than in neighbouring County Donegal. The name "Templemore" originally designated the medieval cathedral of Derry, and later the parish west of the River Foyle served by the cathedral. A 1613 charter included the portion of the parish nearest the renamed city of Londonderry within the city's northwest liberties and the new County Londonderry. Subsequently, the County Donegal portion of Templemore was made into separate parishes (Muff, Burt, and Inch).

== Barons Templemore (1831) ==
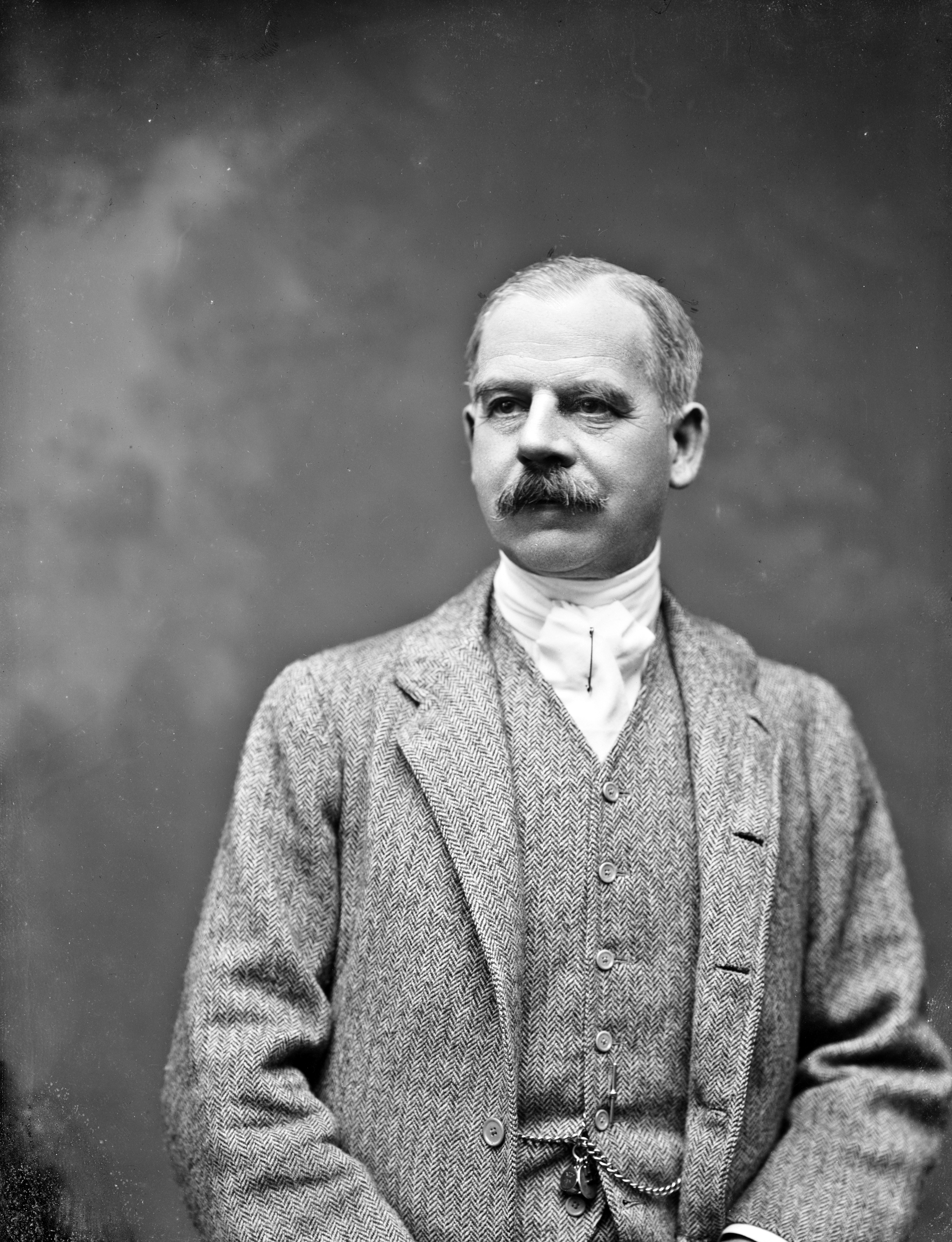
Arthur Henry Chichester, 3rd Baron Templemore (1911)

- Arthur Chichester, 1st Baron Templemore (1797–1837)
- Harry Spencer Chichester, 2nd Baron Templemore (1821–1906)
- Arthur Henry Chichester, 3rd Baron Templemore (1854–1924)
- Arthur Claud Spencer Chichester, 4th Baron Templemore (1880–1953)
- Dermot Richard Claud Chichester, 5th Baron Templemore (1916–2007) (succeeded as 7th Marquess of Donegall in 1975)

For further succession, see Marquess of Donegall.

=== Title succession chart ===
Chichester and O'Neill family tree, including: Barons Chichester, Templemore, O'Neill and Rathcavan, Viscounts Chichester, Earls of Donegall, and Marquesses of Donegall

John Chichester d. 1569
Baron Chichester (1st creation), 1613	Viscount Chichester and Baron Chichester (2nd creation), 1625
Arthur Chichester; 1563–1625; Baron Chichester	Edward Chichester; 1568–1648; 1st Viscount Chichester, etc.
Barony chichester (1st creation) extinct, 1625
Earl of Donegall, 1647
Arthur Chichester; 1606–1675; 1st Earl of Donegall, etc.	John Chichester; 1609–1647
Williaṃ Chichester d. 1660	Arthur Chichester d. 1678; 2nd Earl of Donegall, etc.	John Chichester
Arthur Chichester; 1666–1706; 3rd Earl of Donegall, etc.	Rev. William Chichester
Arthur Chichester; 1695–1757; 4th Earl of Donegall, etc.	John Chichester; 1700–1746	Arthur Chichester
Baron Fisherwick, 1790 (GB); Marquess of Donegall and Earl of Belfast, 1791
Arthur Chichester; 1739–1799; 1st Marquess of Donegall, etc., 5th Earl of Donegall, etc.	Rev. William Chichester d. 1815
Chichester baronetcy (UK), 1821
George Chichester; 1769–1844; 2nd Marquess of Donegall, etc., 6th Earl of Donegall, etc.	Arthur Chichester; 1771–1788	Spencer Chichester; 1775–1819	Arthur Chichester; 1st Baronet c. 1769–1847	Edward Chichester d. 1840
Baronetcy extinct
Baron Ennishowen and Carrickfergus (UK) 1841	Baron Templemore (UK), 1831	Baron O'Neill (UK), 1868
George Chichester; 1797–1883; 3rd Marquess of Donegall, etc., 7th Earl of Donegall, etc.	Edward Chichester; 1799–1889; 4th Marquess of Donegall, etc., 8th Earl of Donegall, etc.	Spencer Chichester; 1805–1825	Arthur Chichester; 1808–1840	Haṃilton Chichester; 1810–1854	John Chichester; 1811–1873	Stephen Chichester; 1814–1890	Arthur Chichester; 1797–1837; 1st Baron Templemore	William (Chichester) O'Neill; 1813–1883; 1st Baron O'Neill
Ennishowen and Carrickfergus barony extinct, 1883
George Chichester styled Viscount Chichester; 1826–1827	Frederick Chichester styled Earl of Belfast; 1827–1853	George Chichester; 1822–1904; 5th Marquess of Donegall, etc., 9th Earl of Donegall, etc.	Henry Chichester; 1834–1928	Adolphus Chichester; 1836–1901	Harry Chichester; 1821–1906; 2nd Baron Templemore	Edward O'Neill; 1839–1928; 2nd Baron O'Neill
Baronet of Cleggan (UK), 1929; Baron Rathcavan (UK), 1953
Severne Chichester; 1861–1951	Forester Chichester; 1864–1865	Robert Chichester; 1873–1921	Augustus Chichester; 1878–1902	Arthur Chichester; 1854–1924; 3rd Baron Templemore	Arthur O'Neill; 1876–1914	Hugh O'Neill; 1883–1982; 1st Baron Rathcavan, etc.
Edward Chichester; 1903–1975; 6th Marquess of Donegall, etc., 10th Earl of Donegall, etc.	Robert Chichester; 1902–1920	Arthur Chichester; 1880–1953; 4th Baron Templemore	Shane O'Neill; 1907–1944; 3rd Baron O'Neill	Phelim O'Neill; 1909–1994; 2nd Baron Rathcavan, etc.
Titles inherited by the 5th Baron Templemore
Arthur Chichester; 1914–1942	Dermot Chichester; 1916–2007; 7th Marquess of Donegall, etc. 11th Earl of Donegall, etc., 5th Baron Templemore	Raymond O'Neill b. 1933; 4th Baron O'Neill	Hugh O'Neill; 1939–2025; 3rd Baron Rathcavan, etc.
Patrick Chichester b. 1952; 8th Marquess of Donegall, etc., 12th Earl of Donegall, etc., 6th Baron Templemore	Shane O'Neill b. 1965	François O'Neill b. 1984; 4th Baron Rathcavan, etc.
James Chichester styled Earl of Belfast b. 1990	Con O'Neill b. 2000	Tyrone O'Neill b. 2023
