= Marquess of Donegall =

Title in the Peerage of Ireland

Marquessate of Donegall
- Arms of the Marquess of Donegall Blazon Arms: Quarterly: 1st and 4th, chequy, or and gule, a chief vair (Chichester); 2nd and 3rd, azure fretty argent (Etchingham). Crest: A stork, proper, wings expanded, holding in its beak an eel, argent, head or. Supporters: Two wolves gules, ducally gorged and chained or..
- Creation date: 4 July 1791
- Created by: George III
- Peerage: Peerage of Ireland
- First holder: Arthur Chichester, 5th Earl of Donegall
- Present holder: Patrick Chichester, 8th Marquess of Donegall
- Heir apparent: James Chichester, Earl of Belfast
- Remainder to: Heirs male of the body
- Subsidiary titles: Earl of Donegall; Earl of Belfast; Viscount Chichester; Baron Chichester; Baron Fisherwick; Baron Templemore
- Status: Extant
- Seat: Dunbrody Park
- Former seats: Dunbrody House; Ormeau House; Belfast Castle; Donegall House
- Motto: INVICTUM SEQUITUR HONOR (Honour follows him who does not seek it)

Marquess of Donegall is a title in the Peerage of Ireland held by the head of the Chichester family, originally from Devon, England. Sir John Chichester sat as a Member of Parliament and was High Sheriff of Devon in 1557. One of his sons, Sir Arthur Chichester, was Lord Deputy of Ireland from 1605 to 1616. In 1613, he was raised to the Peerage of Ireland as Baron Chichester, of Belfast in County Antrim. When he died childless in 1625 the barony became extinct.

However, in the same year the Chichester title was revived in favour of his younger brother, Edward Chichester, who was made Baron Chichester, of Belfast in the County of Antrim, and Viscount Chichester, of Carrickfergus in County Antrim. Both titles are in the Peerage of Ireland. He was succeeded by his eldest son, Arthur Chichester. A distinguished soldier, he was created Earl of Donegall in the Peerage of Ireland in 1647 (one year before he succeeded his father), with remainder to the heirs male of his father.

He died without male issue and was succeeded (in the earldom according to the special remainder) by his nephew Arthur Chichester, the second Earl. He was the eldest son of Lieutenant-Colonel John Chichester, second son of the first Viscount. Lord Donegall had previously represented County Donegal in the Irish House of Commons. His eldest son, the third Earl, was a Major-General in the Spanish army and fought in the War of the Spanish Succession. He was killed in action in 1706. His eldest son, the fourth Earl, died childless and was succeeded by his nephew, the fifth Earl. He was the son of the Hon. John Chichester, younger son of the third Earl. Lord Donegall was created Baron Fisherwick, of Fisherwick in the County of Stafford, in the Peerage of Great Britain in 1790, and one year later he was further honoured when he was made Earl of Belfast and Marquess of Donegall in the Peerage of Ireland.

His grandson, the third Marquess, served as Captain of the Yeomen of the Guard under Lord John Russell between 1848 and 1852. In 1841, three years before he succeeded his father in the marquessate, he was created Baron Ennishowen and Carrickfergus, of Ennishowen in the County of Donegal and of Carrickfergus in the County of Antrim, in the Peerage of the United Kingdom. Both his sons predeceased him and on his death in 1883 the barony of 1841 became extinct. He was succeeded in his other titles by his younger brother, the fourth Marquess. On the death of his grandson, the sixth Marquess, in 1975, the line of the second Marquess failed. The sixth Marquess was succeeded by his kinsman, the fifth Baron Templemore (see below), who became the seventh Marquess. From 1790 until 1999, when most hereditary seats were abolished with the passage of the House of Lords Act 1999, the Marquess sat in the House of Lords as Baron Fisherwick in the Peerage of Great Britain. As of 2015, the titles are held by the latter's son, the eighth Marquess, who succeeded in 2007.

The county in Ulster from which the title is derived is now spelt Donegal. Several locations in Belfast are named after the family, such as Donegall Square, Donegall Place, Donegall Road, Donegall Pass, Donegall Quay, Chichester Street, Arthur Street, Arthur Square, and Chichester Park.

== Chichester family ==
Several other members of the Chichester family have also gained distinction. John Chichester, grandson of Sir John Chichester, brother of the first Baron Chichester and the first Viscount Chichester, was created a baronet in 1641 (see Chichester baronets). John Chichester, second son of the first Viscount and father of the second Earl, represented Dungannon in the Irish House of Commons. For the branch of the family founded by John Chichester's younger son and namesake, John Chichester, see Baron O'Neill and Baron Rathcavan.

Arthur Chichester, eldest son of Lord Spencer Chichester, third son of the first Marquess, was created Baron Templemore in 1831. Lord Arthur Chichester, fourth son of the second Marquess, and Lord John Chichester, sixth son of the second Marquess, both represented Belfast in Parliament. Robert Chichester, eldest son of Lord Adolphus Chichester, youngest son of the fourth Marquess, briefly represented Londonderry South in Parliament. His wife Dehra was also a politician while their daughter, Marion Caroline Dehra, was the mother of James Chichester-Clark, Baron Moyola, who served briefly as Prime Minister of Northern Ireland, and the politician Sir Robin Chichester-Clark and of the gardening writer and television presenter Penelope Hobhouse.

== Family seats ==
=== Ulster and Dublin ===
The caput, or family seat, has been in several locations over the centuries, usually in the east of Ulster. Joymount House was built for the 1st Baron Chichester in the 1610s in Carrickfergus in the south-east of County Antrim, probably being completed in 1618. Joymount, along with Chichester House on the outskirts of Dublin and the Plantation-era Belfast Castle in the centre of Belfast, were the three original principal residences of the Chichester family in Ireland. Lord Chichester maintained Chichester House, located on the Hoggen Green (now College Green), as his 'town' residence on what was then the eastern edge of Dublin. Joymount House was probably demolished in the early eighteenth century, while Parliament House was built on the site of Chichester House in Dublin in the early 1730s. The Plantation-era Belfast Castle was largely destroyed by fire on 24 April 1708 and was not rebuilt.

In the early to mid-nineteenth century, the family seats were: Donegall House, a large townhouse on the corner of what is now Donegall Place and Donegall Square North in central Belfast (Donegall House was later converted, in the 1820s, into a hotel called The Royal Hotel); and Ormeau House (formerly Ormeau Cottage), a mansion largely built in the 1820s in the Ormeau Demesne (now Ormeau Park) in County Down, in what was then the south-eastern outskirts of Belfast. Both these residences were later demolished, with Ormeau House being demolished in 1869 or 1870.

The 2nd Marquess of Donegall, again during the early to mid-nineteenth century, also maintained Fisherwick Lodge, a hunting 'lodge' near Doagh in County Antrim, on the family's country estate there. Later in the nineteenth century, Belfast Castle, on the lower slopes of Cave Hill in North Belfast, was purpose-designed and built for the 3rd Marquess of Donegall as the main residence of the family. This new Belfast Castle, a Victorian structure built in the 1860s, was inherited by the 8th Earl of Shaftesbury and his wife in October 1883, thus passing out of the ownership of the Chichester family. Lord Shaftesbury had married the daughter of the third Marquess.

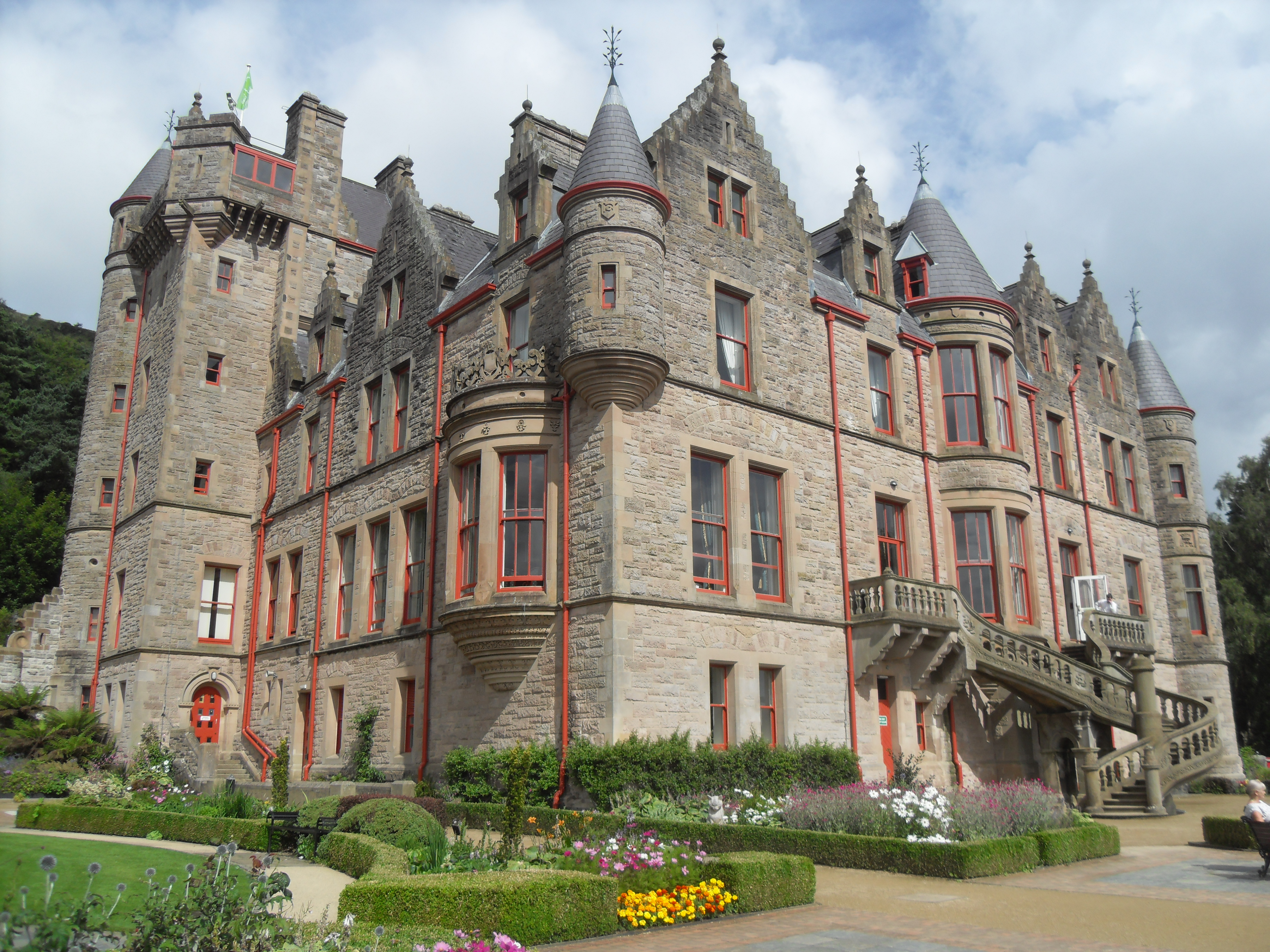
Belfast Castle (photographed in August 2011), constructed for the 3rd Marquess of Donegall on the slopes of Cave Hill in the 1860s.

=== County Wexford ===
From October 1953 until about 1996, Dunbrody House, formerly the seat of the Barons Templemore near Arthurstown in the south-west of County Wexford, was the family seat of the 7th Marquess of Donegall. From October 1953 until May 1975, the seventh Marquess was known as the 5th Baron Templemore. Arthurstown was named for the 1st Earl of Donegall. The house was sold by the seventh Marquess to chef Kevin Dundon, who converted it into a luxury hotel and restaurant in 1997. What remains of the Dunbrody Estate is, however, still in the ownership of the current head of the family, The 8th Marquess of Donegall, whose present family seat is the much smaller Dunbrody Park within the estate grounds.

== Baron Chichester (1613) ==
- Arthur Chichester, 1st Baron Chichester (1563–1625)

== Baron Chichester and Viscount Chichester (1625) ==
- Edward Chichester, 1st Viscount Chichester (1568–1648)
- Arthur Chichester, 2nd Viscount Chichester (1606–1675; created Earl of Donegall in 1647)

=== Earl of Donegall (1647) ===
- Arthur Chichester, 1st Earl of Donegall (1606–1675)
- Arthur Chichester, 2nd Earl of Donegall (died 1678)
- Arthur Chichester, 3rd Earl of Donegall (1666–1706)
- Arthur Chichester, 4th Earl of Donegall (1695–1757)
- Arthur Chichester, 5th Earl of Donegall (1739–1799; created Baron Fisherwick [GB] in 1790 and Marquess of Donegall in 1791)

=== Marquess of Donegall (1791) ===
- Arthur Chichester, 1st Marquess of Donegall (1739–1799)
- George Augustus Chichester, 2nd Marquess of Donegall (1769–1844)
- George Hamilton Chichester, 3rd Marquess of Donegall, (1797–1883; created Baron Ennishowen and Carrickfergus [UK] in 1841)
- Edward Chichester, 4th Marquess of Donegall (1799–1889)
- George Augustus Hamilton Chichester, 5th Marquess of Donegall (1822–1904)
- Edward Arthur Donald St George Hamilton Chichester, 6th Marquess of Donegall (1903–1975)
- Dermot Richard Claud Chichester, 7th Marquess of Donegall (5th Baron Templemore) (1916–2007)
- Arthur Patrick Chichester, 8th Marquess of Donegall (b. 1952)

== Present peer ==
(Arthur) Patrick Chichester, 8th Marquess of Donegall (born 9 May 1952), is the eldest son of the 7th Marquess. Styled as Earl of Belfast from 1975 to April 2007, he was educated at Harrow School and the Royal Agricultural College, Cirencester, and was commissioned into the Coldstream Guards.

In April 2007 he succeeded his father as Marquess of Donegall and in his other peerages. He also holds 1/100 of the office of Lord Great Chamberlain. Donegall is married to Caroline Philipson (born 1959), and they have two children:

- James Arthur Chichester, Earl of Belfast (born 1990), heir apparent
- Lady Catherine Chichester (born 1992).

They live near Arthurstown in the south-west of County Wexford.

== Family tree and line of succession ==
Chichester and O'Neill family tree, including: Barons Chichester, Templemore, O'Neill and Rathcavan, Viscounts Chichester, Earls of Donegall, and Marquesses of Donegall

John Chichester d. 1569
Baron Chichester (1st creation), 1613	Viscount Chichester and Baron Chichester (2nd creation), 1625
Arthur Chichester; 1563–1625; Baron Chichester	Edward Chichester; 1568–1648; 1st Viscount Chichester, etc.
Barony chichester (1st creation) extinct, 1625
Earl of Donegall, 1647
Arthur Chichester; 1606–1675; 1st Earl of Donegall, etc.	John Chichester; 1609–1647
Williaṃ Chichester d. 1660	Arthur Chichester d. 1678; 2nd Earl of Donegall, etc.	John Chichester
Arthur Chichester; 1666–1706; 3rd Earl of Donegall, etc.	Rev. William Chichester
Arthur Chichester; 1695–1757; 4th Earl of Donegall, etc.	John Chichester; 1700–1746	Arthur Chichester
Baron Fisherwick, 1790 (GB); Marquess of Donegall and Earl of Belfast, 1791
Arthur Chichester; 1739–1799; 1st Marquess of Donegall, etc., 5th Earl of Donegall, etc.	Rev. William Chichester d. 1815
Chichester baronetcy (UK), 1821
George Chichester; 1769–1844; 2nd Marquess of Donegall, etc., 6th Earl of Donegall, etc.	Arthur Chichester; 1771–1788	Spencer Chichester; 1775–1819	Arthur Chichester; 1st Baronet c. 1769–1847	Edward Chichester d. 1840
Baronetcy extinct
Baron Ennishowen and Carrickfergus (UK) 1841	Baron Templemore (UK), 1831	Baron O'Neill (UK), 1868
George Chichester; 1797–1883; 3rd Marquess of Donegall, etc., 7th Earl of Donegall, etc.	Edward Chichester; 1799–1889; 4th Marquess of Donegall, etc., 8th Earl of Donegall, etc.	Spencer Chichester; 1805–1825	Arthur Chichester; 1808–1840	Haṃilton Chichester; 1810–1854	John Chichester; 1811–1873	Stephen Chichester; 1814–1890	Arthur Chichester; 1797–1837; 1st Baron Templemore	William (Chichester) O'Neill; 1813–1883; 1st Baron O'Neill
Ennishowen and Carrickfergus barony extinct, 1883
George Chichester styled Viscount Chichester; 1826–1827	Frederick Chichester styled Earl of Belfast; 1827–1853	George Chichester; 1822–1904; 5th Marquess of Donegall, etc., 9th Earl of Donegall, etc.	Henry Chichester; 1834–1928	Adolphus Chichester; 1836–1901	Harry Chichester; 1821–1906; 2nd Baron Templemore	Edward O'Neill; 1839–1928; 2nd Baron O'Neill
Baronet of Cleggan (UK), 1929; Baron Rathcavan (UK), 1953
Severne Chichester; 1861–1951	Forester Chichester; 1864–1865	Robert Chichester; 1873–1921	Augustus Chichester; 1878–1902	Arthur Chichester; 1854–1924; 3rd Baron Templemore	Arthur O'Neill; 1876–1914	Hugh O'Neill; 1883–1982; 1st Baron Rathcavan, etc.
Edward Chichester; 1903–1975; 6th Marquess of Donegall, etc., 10th Earl of Donegall, etc.	Robert Chichester; 1902–1920	Arthur Chichester; 1880–1953; 4th Baron Templemore	Shane O'Neill; 1907–1944; 3rd Baron O'Neill	Phelim O'Neill; 1909–1994; 2nd Baron Rathcavan, etc.
Titles inherited by the 5th Baron Templemore
Arthur Chichester; 1914–1942	Dermot Chichester; 1916–2007; 7th Marquess of Donegall, etc. 11th Earl of Donegall, etc., 5th Baron Templemore	Raymond O'Neill b. 1933; 4th Baron O'Neill	Hugh O'Neill; 1939–2025; 3rd Baron Rathcavan, etc.
Patrick Chichester b. 1952; 8th Marquess of Donegall, etc., 12th Earl of Donegall, etc., 6th Baron Templemore	Shane O'Neill b. 1965	François O'Neill b. 1984; 4th Baron Rathcavan, etc.
James Chichester styled Earl of Belfast b. 1990	Con O'Neill b. 2000	Tyrone O'Neill b. 2023

Line of succession (simplified)
- Arthur Chichester, 1st Marquess of Donegall (1739–1799)
  - George Chichester, 2nd Marquess of Donegall (1769–1844)
    - George Chichester, 3rd Marquess of Donegall (1797–1883)
    - Edward Chichester, 4th Marquess of Donegall (1799–1889)
      - George Chichester, 5th Marquess of Donegall (1822–1904)
        - Edward Chichester, 6th Marquess of Donegall (1903–1975)
  - Lord Spencer Stanley Chichester (1775–1819)
    - Arthur Chichester, 1st Baron Templemore (1797–1837)
      - Harry Spencer Chichester, 2nd Baron Templemore (1821–1906)
        - Arthur Henry Chichester, 3rd Baron Templemore (1854–1924)
          - Arthur Claud Spencer Chichester, 4th Baron Templemore (1880–1953)
            - Dermot Chichester, 7th Marquess of Donegall (1916–2007)
              - (Arthur) Patrick Chichester, 8th Marquess of Donegall (born 1952)
                - (1) James Arthur Chichester, Earl of Belfast (born 1990)
                  - (2) Arthur Humphrey John, Viscount Chichester (born 2022)
                  - (3) Sebastian Claud Spencer Chichester (born 2024)
            - Major Lord Desmond Clive Chichester (1920–2000)
              - (4) Desmond Shane Spencer Chichester (born 1948)
                - (5) Patrick Michael Desmond Chichester (born 1980)
                - (6) Henry Richard Chichester (born 1981)
              - Dermot Michael Claud Chichester (1953–2010)
                - (7) Rory Alastair Chichester (born 1985)
                - (8) Maximilian Patrick Columbus Chichester (born 2000)
      - Hon. Francis Algernon James Chichester (1829–1885)
        - Shane Randolph Chichester (1883–1969)
          - Major Oscar Richard Herschel Chichester (1915–2006)
            - male issue and descendants in remainder

There are other heirs to the earldom and its subsidiary peerages, who are descended from the Hon. John Chichester, younger brother of the second earl.

== See also ==
- Chichester baronets
- Baron Templemore
- Baron O'Neill
- Baron Rathcavan
- Baron Carrickfergus
- Belfast Castle
