= West Downs School =

Independent preparatory school, Winchester, England (1897-1988)

Coordinates: 51.056°N 1.343°W

West Downs School, Romsey Road, Winchester, Hampshire, was an English independent preparatory school, which was established in 1897 and closed in 1988.

== History ==
=== Founding ===
The school was founded by Lionel Helbert (1870–1919), with help from his sister Adeline Rose, wife to Vice Admiral Sir James Goodrich, KCVO (1851–1925). Helbert an exhibitioner of both Winchester and Oriel College, Oxford, was for over four years a House of Commons clerk. The Helberts were supported by Hampshire's Lord Northbrook (who had also helped found the predecessor school), and by their kinsman Lord Rothschild.

Helbert, who described himself as Principal, was influenced by the Miss Mason system, as seen at her House of Education, Ambleside (akin to the PNEU), and things like the Montessori method, the ideas of Edmond Holmes, and the Little Commonwealth for young delinquents developed by Homer Lane on the lines of the George Junior Republic in America, basically as put by Norman Mac Munn, who taught at West Downs 1914–18, they were interested in the: emancipation of the child.

=== Architecture ===
The majority of the existing structure was purpose-built (c1880) as 'Winchester Modern School', to designs by Thomas Stopher jnr, on a good site on the south-western edge of the cathedral city of Winchester, nearly opposite (the Royal Hampshire County Hospital, architect William Butterfield) west of a Victorian county gaol, HMP Winchester (category B), and next to Edwin Hillier's nursery, established there in 1874. Eight years into his headmastership, Helbert added a hall, a chapel and Masters' Lodge, the latter separate, the former two joined to the existing building's western end.

=== Administration ===
On Helbert's death there was an hiatus under Dorset landowner William Brymer, and Lady Goodrich then passed the school to Kenneth Tindall, a Sherborne housemaster.

During the Second World War the school was evacuated first to Glenapp Castle and then more significantly to Blair Castle. At the end of the war it returned to Winchester.

In 1953 the school was bought by Jerry Cornes, who was headmaster until 1988.

=== Move to co-education ===
For most of its history West Downs was a boarding school for boys aged between eight and thirteen, but in 1970 it admitted its first girl, and from 1975 to 1988 it was co-educational (though curiously the school's founding intake in 1897 of four comprised two girls). [correction: by Geoffrey Bass, grandson of Kenneth Tindall:- KBT's granddaughter Diana Bass also attended the school in 1949 when it was still an all male establishment].

=== Closing and repurposing ===
West Downs prepared its pupils for a variety of schools (including Winchester and Eton) and for life in general. It lasted ninety-one years and had three headmasters, closing in 1988.

The school's site has lived on as The West Downs Conference and Performing Arts Centre, which was opened by Lord Puttnam in May 2001, and then from 2005 as part of the University of Winchester; and from 2009 as the university's own Winchester Business School.

== Helbert family ==
Lionel Helbert Helbert was sixth or seventh child of Captain Frederic John Helbert Helbert (1829–), 5th Madras Light Cavalry and military correspondent to the Times during the 1877 Turco-Russian war, the fifth son of John Helbert Israel (by Adelaide (Adeline) Cohen), second son of Israel Israel. In 1848 the grandfather John Helbert (1785–1861), with his nephew John Wagg (1793–1878), had formed broking firm Helbert, Wagg & Co. (bought by Schroders 1962). They were the Rothschild's principal broker. Meanwhile, Helbert's mother was Sarah Magdalene 'Lena' (1837–1874) daughter of Richard Lane (1794–1870) (Plymouth Brother and descendant of Jane Lane) by Sarah Pink Tracey (of Liskeard). One of Helbert's Lane uncles was a Major-general in the Bengal Army and another, a shipping agent with Lane, Hickey & Company (bust by 1865), was English Secretary to the Japanese Legation in London and a Knight Commander of the Orders of the Rising Sun of Japan, Christ of Portugal, and Isabella the Catholic of Spain.

His aunt Adeline (1825–1892) was wife to Baron de Weissweiller of Madrid. Another was married to a Duke de Laurito (d.1907). His Cohen great-aunts, who were also his cousins, had married Nathan Mayer Rothschild and Moses Montefiore. A great-uncle Samuel Helbert Israel Ellis was a surgeon at the London Hospital c.1802 and treasurer of the Great Synagogue, Duke's Place, London. Samuel's son was Sir Barrow Helbert Ellis, K.C.S.I., HEICS (1823–1887). Meanwhile, Helbert's brother Charles Helbert Helbert (d.1903) married Evelyn Mary Kennedy, granddaughter of Earl of Cassillis and Viscount Dungarvan and great-granddaughter of Earl of Howth.

(source: Records of the Franklin Family and Collaterals, compiled by Arthur Ellis Franklin, private circulation, George Routledge & sons, London, 1915.)

== Some alumni ==
About 2,100 pupils passed through West Downs, including the following:

=== Helbert era (1897–1922) ===
- John Amery, activist and member of the British Free Corps; executed 19 December 1945, aged 33
- Randal McDonnell, 8th Earl of Antrim, and his brother James, MBE
- Lord Ashley, father of Earl of Shaftesbury
- David Astor, CH (proprietor and editor of The Observer)
- William Astor, 3rd Viscount Astor (peer)
- 3rd Earl of Balfour
- Simon, Denzil, Giles (cricketer), Aubrey, and Esmond Baring, grandsons of 4th Lord Ashburton
- Sir Malcolm Barclay-Harvey (governor of South Australia)
- Sir Randle Baker-Wilbraham, 7th Bt
- Colonel H. C. C. Batten, DSO (despatches five times)
- 8th Earl Beauchamp (politician) and his brother Hugh Patrick Lygon (one of the inspirations for Evelyn Waugh's Sebastian Flyte)
- Sir Alexander Maitland Sharp Bethune, 10th and last Baronet
- Sir Frederick "Boy" Browning (lieutenant-general and husband of Daphne du Maurier)
- Gerard Bucknall (lieutenant-general)
- 7th and 8th Earls of Chichester
- Hon. Sir Gerald Chichester, KCVO, and his brother Richard (killed 1915, Serbia), sons of 3rd Lord Templemore
- Sir Michael Culme-Seymour 5th Bt.
- Major-General Sir David Dawnay, KCVO; and his brother Vice-Admiral Sir Peter Dawnay, KCVO; (grandsons of 8th Viscount Downe and 5th Marquess of Waterford).
- Lt. Col. Christopher Dawnay, MVO (of Lazard Bros., Dalgety, and Guardian Assurance);
- Air Commodore Desmond H. de Burgh, AFC (killed 1943), 1st cousin twice removed of Chris de Burgh (their ancestors came from Oldtown, County Kildare);
- 3rd Lord De Ramsey
- Vice Admiral Sir Edmund Malcolm Evans-Lombe, KCB, commanded HMS Glasgow, 1942–1943
- 4th Lord Farrer
- 12th Earl Ferrers, and his brother hon. Andrew Shirley, keeper of Fine Art (Ashmolean), biographer of Constable, and author The Lion and the Lily, 1956
- Sir Francis Festing (Field Marshal)
- Sir Fordham Flower, brewer and "extraordinary maverick chairman of Stratford" (as described by Sir Peter Hall)
- Sir Edward Ford (courtier)
- Richard Fort, MP
- Ivor Geikie-Cobb (MD, MRCS, LRCP, FRSL, physician and author)
- 2nd Lord Glenconner (father of Emma Tennant), and his brothers Lt. the Hon. Edward "Bim" Tennant (killed in action, World War I war poet), see monumental inscription to him in Salisbury Cathedral designed by Allan G. Wyon, and Stephen Tennant, nephews of Margot Asquith
- Anthony Henniker-Gotley (1887–1972), a rugby union international who represented England from 1910 to 1911 and captained the national side
- 2nd and last Viscount Harcourt
- 2nd Lord Hazlerigg (cricketer)
- Michael Hesketh-Prichard, son of Hesketh Hesketh-Prichard, and grandson of 3rd Earl of Verulam (thus 1st cousin of 5th and 6th earls, see below)
- Admiral Sir Deric Holland-Martin, husband to Dame Rosamund, and his brother Christopher Holland-Martin
- 6th Viscount Hood
- 2nd and last Lord Horder. Mervyn Horder
- 7th Lord Hotham
- Lord Hyde, killed shooting 1935, son of George Villiers, 6th Earl of Clarendon
- Sir Richard Keane, 6th Bt., of Cappoquin, born in 1909
- 7th Lord Kensington and his brothers Hugh (father of 8th Lord K.), David and Michael Edwardes (adjutant of the Tower Hamlet Rifles c1942);
- 3rd Lord Kinross
- Antony Bulwer-Lytton, Viscount Knebworth (politician)
- Lt. Col. Harold Boscawen Leveson-Gower, 1st cousin of Lord Sherfield, and descended from youngest son of 1st Earl Gower who married daughter of Edward Boscawen
- Robert Linzee, CB, son-in-law of 1st Viscount Craigavon
- Malcolm, 1st Lord McCorquodale (politician)
- Henry Wyndham Stanley Monck, 6th Viscount Monck
- Victor Montagu (disclaimed the Earldom of Sandwich and politician) and his brother William Drogo Sturges Montagu, RAF flying officer (no. 91111), died on 26 January 1940
- Henry James Montagu Stuart Wortley, of BOAC, nephew of 2nd Earl of Wharncliffe and grandson of 1st Lord St Oswald
- Sir Oswald Mosley, 6th Bt, Ancoats; (Politician, MP for Harrow 1918–24, Smethwick 1926–31, Chancellor of the Dutch of Lancaster 1929–30, know principally as the founder of the British Union of Fascists)
- (John Seely, 2nd Baron Mottistone) and 3rd Baron Mottistone
- Major-General Sir John Nelson, KCVO, sometime Major-General commanding the Household Division
- Edward Agar, 5th Earl of Normanton
- 3rd Lord Lord O'Neill (killed 1944), and his brother Hon. Brian, killed 1940
- Sir Walter Frederic Pretyman, KBE, of Campos, Brazil, emigrated there 1924. Son of Ernest Pretyman.
- Sir John Pigott-Brown, 2nd Bt. (killed in action, 1942)
- Sir Hugh (Hubert) Charles Rhys Rankin, 3rd Bt. (a soi-disant "red militant Communist")
- John Rankin Rathbone (politician and RAFVF World War II fighter pilot, killed in action)
- 5th Lord Rayleigh and his brother Charles Strutt
- Sir Richard Rees 2nd and last Bt.
- Major Francis Howe Richards, DSO (despatches and wounded four times World War I)
- 7th Earl of Romney
- Lord Duncan-Sandys, CH (politician)
- Christopher Soames, Baron Soames
- Sir Peter Scott, CH, FRS (naturalist)
- Sir David Scott Fox, KCMG, civil servant, briefly thought to KGB Agent Scott, Arthur Wynn
- 7th and last Earl of Sefton, and his brother Hon. Cecil Molyneux, RN (killed at Jutland)
- Sir Roger Makins, Lord Sherfield, FRS (diplomat)
- 2nd Viscount Simon
- Peter Smith-Dorrien, son of General Sir Horace Smith-Dorrien and killed by Zionists at the King David Hotel bombing 1946, and his brother Gerald (killed 1944) and their 1st cousins-once-removed Algernon R. A. (killed 1942) and Thomas Mervyn Smith-Dorrien-Smith of Tresco, Isles of Scilly, the mother of his children was Russo-Georgian H.S.H Princess Tamara Imeretinsky. (Tresco thanks to Augustus Smith); five Dorrien-Smiths were killed 1940–46.
- Sir Rupert Speir (politician)
- Ernest John Spooner (admiral)
- 8th Earl of Tankerville (then styled Viscount Ossulston)
- 7th Marquess of Waterford;
- 5th and 6th Earls of Verulam
- Col. John Francis Williams Wynne, CBE, DSO, JP, of Peniarth, Tywyn
- 14th Earl of Winchilsea and his brother Denys Finch Hatton, depicted by Robert Redford in the film Out of Africa (1985)
- Sir John Garmondsway Wrightson, 3rd Bt (of Head Wrightson) (and his Cornes era brothers Peter, OBE, Commander Rodney and Judge Oliver Wrightson).

=== Tindall era (1923–1953) ===
- 5th Lord Aldenham and his elder brother Vicary (d.1944)
- 3rd Viscount Allenby of Megiddo, (elected hereditary peer)
- Rt. Rev. Keith Appleby Arnold, inaugural Bishop of Warwick
- Sir Jack Boles, MBE, director-general of National Trust
- Admiral Sir John Brigstocke, KCB, CBE, judicial appointments and conduct ombudsman
- John Crichton-Stuart, 6th Marquess of Bute, KBE
- Sir John Colville (Churchill's secretary)
- Michael Colvin (politician)
- Anthony Duckworth-Chad
- 9th Viscount Falmouth (and 26th Baron le Despencer), and brothers Robert, MC, (politician), Evelyn (killed 1943), and Henry Boscawen (AMICE)
- Robin, 13th Earl Ferrers (statesman)
- 3rd Lord Gainford and his brother George Pease
- 7th Viscount Hood
- Peter Howell, actor
- Richard Ingrams (editor of Private Eye) and Leonard Ingrams;
- Wayland Young, 2nd Lord Kennet (politician)
- 6th Lord Methuen, of Corsham
- Sir Jeremy Morse (Chancellor of University of Bristol, Chairman of Lloyds Bank)
- Terence O'Neill, Lord O'Neill of the Maine, (statesman, fourth Prime Minister of Northern Ireland, 1963–69), son of Arthur O'Neill and brother of Shane, 3rd Lord O'Neill (see above);
- Nicholas Ridley, Baron Ridley of Liddesdale, Lord Ridley of Liddesdale, Conservative politician
- Christopher, Lord Soames, CH (statesman)
- Admiral Sir William Stavely (First Sea Lord)
- 2nd Viscount Ullswater (elected hereditary peer and courtier)
- Frank Willan, Royal Air Force officer and politician
- Peter Wilmot-Sitwell, inventor of the city "dawn-raid" and father of Alex Wilmot-Sitwell
- 2nd and last Lord Wilson

=== Cornes era (1954–1987) ===
- Richard Addis, journalist and former Anglican monk
- 6th Lord Aldenham
- Major General Benjamin J. Bathurst CBE Late Welsh Guards, son of Admiral of the Fleet Sir David Bathurst;
- 7th Viscount Monck
- Peter Neyroud
- Andrew Selous, politician
- 7th Earl of Verulam, financier
- 7th Lord Huntingfield
