= Gerald Chichester =

British diplomat and courtier (1886–1939)

The Honourable Sir Gerald Chichester KCVO

Private Secretary to Queen Mary
- In office 1935–1939
- Preceded by: Sir Harry Verney

Personal details
- Born: Gerald Henry Crofton Chichester; 22 June 1886
- Died: 8 October 1939 (aged 53) Charlwood, Surrey
- Parent(s): Arthur Chichester, 3rd Baron Templemore; Alice Elizabeth Dawkins
- Education: Eton College
- Alma mater: Trinity College, Cambridge
- Awards: Legion of Honour – (1927)

The Honourable Sir Gerald Henry Crofton Chichester (22 June 1886 – 8 October 1939) was a British diplomat and courtier of Anglo-Irish descent who served as Private Secretary to Queen Mary.

== Early life ==
Chichester was born on 22 June 1886 into an old Anglo-Irish family. He was the eldest son of Arthur Chichester, 3rd Baron Templemore, and his second wife, Alice Elizabeth Dawkins. From his father's first marriage, he had an elder half-brother, Arthur Chichester, 4th Baron Templemore, who married Hon. Clare Wingfield (a daughter of the 7th Viscount Powerscourt).

His paternal grandparents were Harry Chichester, 2nd Baron Templemore, and his first wife, Laura Caroline Jane Paget (a daughter of diplomat Sir Arthur Paget). His nephew, Dermot Chichester, 5th Baron Templemore, became the 7th Marquess of Donegall in 1975. His maternal grandparents were Marianne Jane (née Robarts) Dawkins and Clinton George Augustus Dawkins, Consul-General to Vienna (and brother to Henry Dawkins of Over Norton Park).

He was educated at Eton College before attending Trinity College, Cambridge. After leaving Cambridge, he went to Frankfurt to study German.

== Career ==
In 1916, he was appointed honorary attaché to the British Legation in Copenhagen before returning to London the following year as a temporary clerk in the Foreign Office. In 1919, he went to the British Embassy in Paris where he served as Private Secretary to The Earl of Derby in 1919 when Lord Derby was the British Ambassador to France (until 1920). Chichester then became Private Secretary to Lord Hardinge in 1920, the next Ambassador to France. When the Marquess of Crewe became Ambassador, Chichester also served as his Private Secretary.

Chichester "was reputed to have the most perfect manners of any British diplomat who served in Paris as well as a French accent that many Parisians could envy. In Paris he was referred to as 'Le Beau Anglais.'"

In 1926, he became Assistant Private Secretary to Queen Mary, becoming her Private Secretary in 1935 after the retirement of Sir Harry Lloyd Verney. His aunt, Lady Bertha Dawkins, had served as a Woman of the Bedchamber to Queen Mary. He served in this capacity until his death in 1939. He was also a Groom-in-Waiting to King George V from 1931 until his death in January 1936. In 1932, he met with Caroline Starr Balestier Kipling and her husband, Rudyard Kipling, who was in London to go over a speech he wrote for the King for Christmas Day.

In 1927, he was awarded the French Legion of Honour. He was created Commander of the Royal Victorian Order in 1929 and elevated to Knight Commander in 1937.

== Personal life ==
"Always immaculately dressed", Chichester, who never married, owned a farmhouse in Surrey where "he created a beautiful home, and there he gathered his friends, mostly drawn from the world of art and music, of which he had a deep and intelligent appreciation." In London, he resided at 15 Bryanston Square in Marylebone.

After becoming ill in May 1938, Sir Gerald died at Tifters Farm, Charlwood, on 8 October 1939. His funeral was held at the Charlwood Parish Church before he was cremated. "The funeral arrangements were carried out by Mr. Thomas Wickens, jnr., Charlwood."
