= Arthur Chichester, 3rd Baron Templemore =

Anglo-Irish peer (1854–1924)

Major The Right Honourable The Lord Templemore JP DL
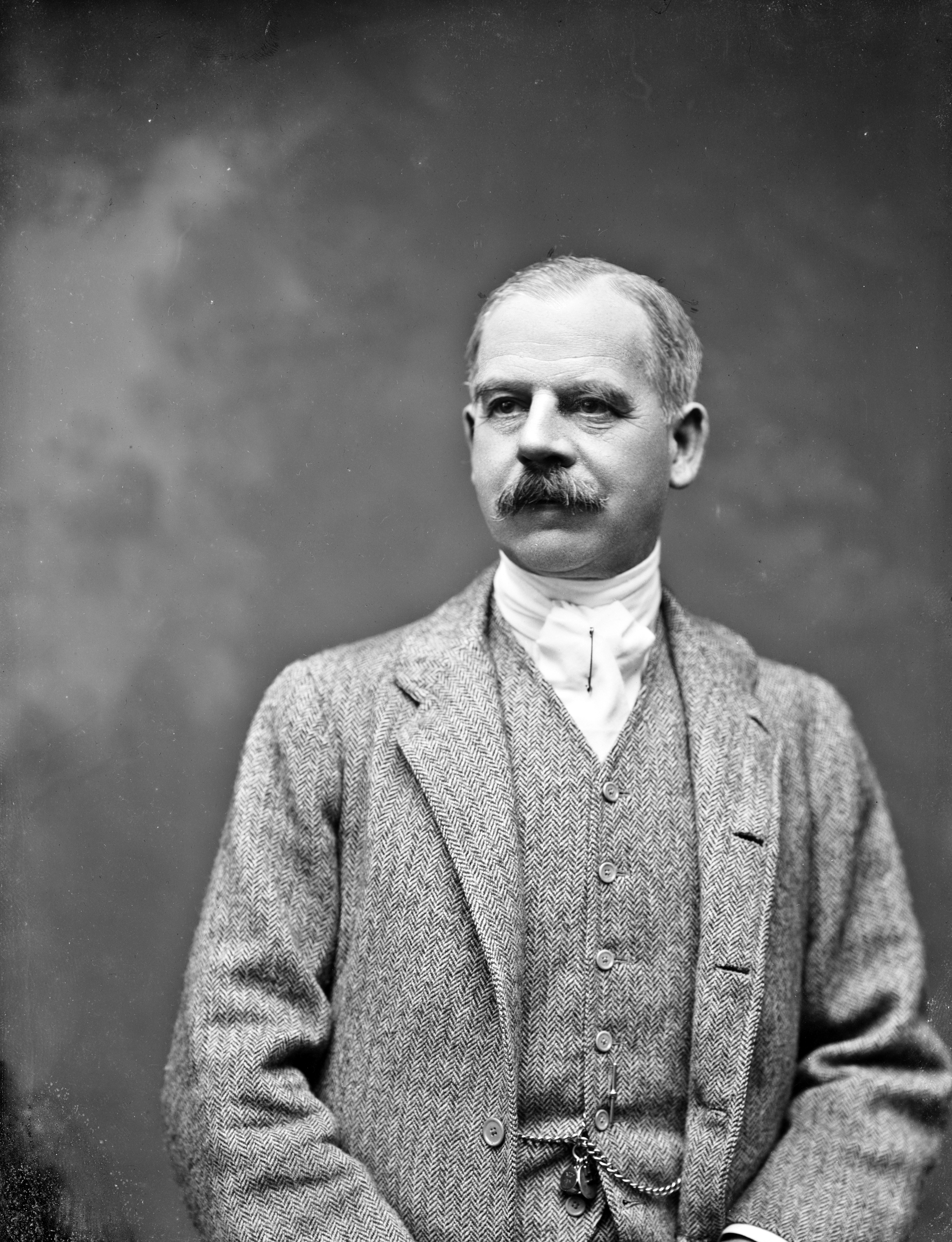
- Photograph Lord Templemore, 1911

High Sheriff of County Wexford
- In office 1890–1890
- Preceded by: Sir Frederick Hughes
- Succeeded by: Robert Westley Hall-Dare

Member of the House of Lords
- Lord Temporal
- In office 10 June 1906 – 28 September 1924
- Preceded by: The 2nd Baron Templemore
- Succeeded by: The 4th Baron Templemore

Personal details
- Born: Arthur Henry Chichester; 16 September 1854
- Died: 28 September 1924 (aged 70)
- Spouse(s): Evelyn Stracey (m. 1879; died 1883) Alice Elizabeth Dawkins (m. 1885–1924)
- Children: 4
- Parent(s): Harry Chichester, 2nd Baron Templemore; Laura Caroline Jane Paget
- Relatives: Dermot Chichester, 7th Marquess of Donegall (grandson)
- Education: Eton College

Arthur Henry Chichester, 3rd Baron Templemore (16 September 1854 – 28 September 1924), styled The Honourable Arthur Chichester between 1854 and 1906, was an Anglo-Irish peer.

== Early life ==
Chichester was born on 16 September 1854. He was the son of Harry Chichester, 2nd Baron Templemore, and his first wife, Laura Caroline Jane Paget. After his mother's death in December 1871, his father married Lady Victoria Ashley-Cooper, daughter of Anthony Ashley-Cooper, 7th Earl of Shaftesbury, and Lady Emily Cowper (a daughter of 5th Earl Cowper), in 1873. From his father's second marriage, he had a younger half-sister, the Hon. Hilda Caroline Chichester, who married Sir Victor George Corkran.

His paternal grandparents were Arthur Chichester, 1st Baron Templemore, and Lady Augusta Paget (a daughter of Field Marshal Henry Paget, 1st Marquess of Anglesey). His maternal grandparents were Sir Arthur Paget and Lady Augusta Fane (a daughter of 10th Earl of Westmorland). His mother Laura was a first cousin of his paternal grandmother Lady Augusta.

He was educated at Eton College, and served as private secretary to R. A. Cross (later Viscount Cross) when he was Home Secretary from 1874 to 1880.

== Career ==
He was a Major in the 3rd Battalion, Royal Irish Regiment, and served as High Sheriff of County Wexford in 1890. The family seat was Dunbrody House near Arthurstown in the south-west of County Wexford. Arthurstown was named for the 1st Earl of Donegall.

Upon the death of his father on 10 June 1906, he succeeded as 3rd Baron Templemore, of Templemore in County Donegal in the Peerage of the United Kingdom. He served as a Justice of the Peace and Deputy Lieutenant of County Wexford.

== Personal life ==
On 14 August 1879, Chichester married Evelyn Stracey, a daughter of the Rev. William James Stracey-Clitherow and Maria Diana (née Bourchier) Stracey. Before her death on 3 December 1883, they were the parents of:

- Arthur Claud Spencer Chichester, 4th Baron Templemore (1880–1953), who married Hon. Clare Meriel Wingfield, daughter of Mervyn Wingfield, 7th Viscount Powerscourt, and Lady Julia Coke (a daughter of the 2nd Earl of Leicester), in 1911.
- Evelyn Laura Mary Chichester (1883–1883), who died in infancy.

On 15 July 1885, Chichester married Alice Elizabeth Dawkins, a daughter of Clinton George Augustus Dawkins, Consul-General to Vienna (and brother to Henry Dawkins of Over Norton Park), and Marianne Jane (née Robarts) Dawkins. Together, they were the parents of:

- Hon. Sir Gerald Henry Crofton Chichester (1886–1939), the private secretary to Queen Mary between 1935 and 1939; he died unmarried.
- Hon. Richard Cecil Frederick Chichester (1889–1915), who died unmarried in Serbia at age 26.

Lord Templemore died on 28 September 1924. His widow, the dowager Lady Templemore, died on 30 September 1954.

=== Descendants ===
Through his son Arthur, he was a grandfather of Dermot Chichester (1916–2007), who became the 5th Baron Templemore in 1953, and the 7th Marquess of Donegall (in the Peerage of Ireland) in 1975 upon the death of his distant cousin, Edward Chichester, 6th Marquess of Donegall, being a descendant of the 1st Baron Templemore, a grandson of the 1st Marquess of Donegall.

Civic offices
Preceded by Sir Frederick Hughes	High Sheriff of Wexford; 1890	Succeeded by Robert Westley Hall-Dare
Peerage of the United Kingdom
Preceded by Harry Chichester	Baron Templemore; 1906–1924; Member of the House of Lords (1906–1924)	Succeeded by Arthur Chichester
