= Lord Lieutenant of Antrim =

List of North Irish lord-lieutenants

A list of people who have served as Lord-Lieutenant of Antrim, located in Northern Ireland.

There were lieutenants of counties in Ireland until the reign of James II, when they were renamed governors. The office of Lord Lieutenant was recreated on 23 August 1831.

== Lords-lieutenant ==
- Randal MacDonnell, 1st Earl of Antrim: 1620–1636(died 1636)
- Alexander MacDonnell, 3rd Earl of Antrim 1685–89 (died 1699)

== Governors ==
- Alexander MacDonnell, 5th Earl of Antrim (died 1775)
- Randal MacDonnell, 1st Marquess of Antrim –1801 (died 1801)
- George Chichester, 2nd Marquess of Donegall: –1831
- Charles O'Neill, 1st Earl O'Neill: –1831

== Lords-lieutenant ==
- Charles O'Neill, 1st Earl O'Neill: 17 October 1831 – 25 March 1841
- George Chichester, 3rd Marquess of Donegall: 24 April 1841 – 20 October 1883
- Robert Adair, 1st Baron Waveney: 4 December 1883 – 15 February 1886
- Sir Edward Porter Cowan: 2 April 1886 – 24 March 1890
- Sir Francis Workman-Macnaghten, 3rd Baronet: 21 May 1890 – 21 July 1911
- Anthony Ashley-Cooper, 9th Earl of Shaftesbury: 2 November 1911 – 1916
- Algernon Skeffington, 12th Viscount Massereene: 9 June 1916 – 1938
- Shane O'Neill, 3rd Baron O'Neill: 14 April 1938 – 24 October 1944
- Senator James Graham Leslie: 12 March 1945 – 16 May 1949
- Hugh O'Neill, 1st Baron Rathcavan: 22 September 1949 – 1959
- Sir Richard Dobbs: 24 March 1959 – 1994
- Raymond O'Neill, 4th Baron O'Neill: 19 April 1994 – 31 August 2008
- Joan Christie: 1 September 2008 – 28 June 2019
- David McCorkell: 29 June 2019 –

== See also ==
- Lists of lord lieutenancies
- Lord lieutenancies of Northern Ireland
- Official Antrim Lieutenancy Website
