= William O'Neill, 1st Baron O'Neill =

Anglo-Irish hereditary peer, clergyman and musical composer

Reverend The Honourable The Lord O'Neill
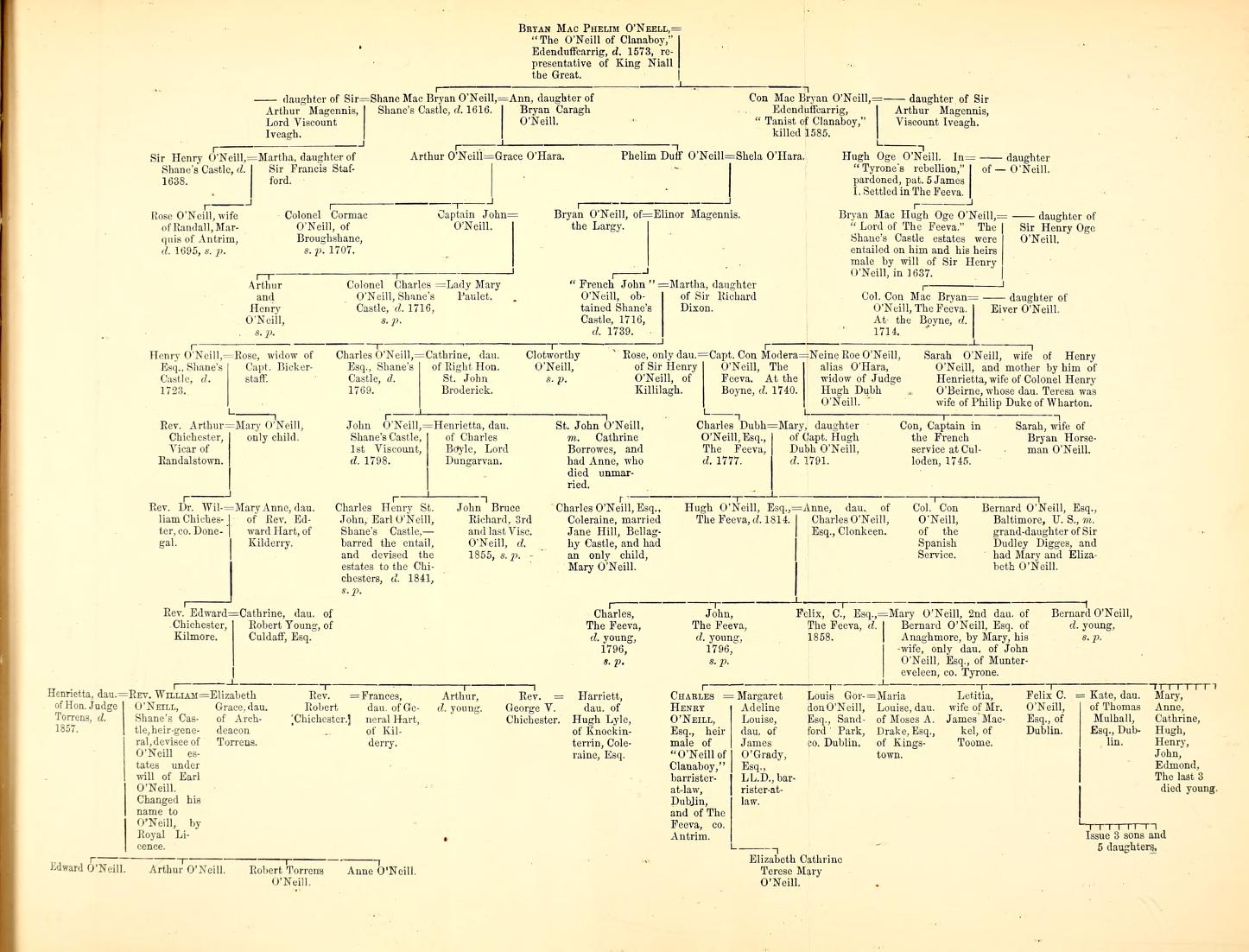
- O'Neill Conroy family tree

Member of the House of Lords
- Lord Temporal
- In office 11 April 1868 – 18 April 1883
- Preceded by: Peerage created
- Succeeded by: The 2nd Baron O'Neill

Personal details
- Born: William Chichester; 4 March 1813
- Died: 18 April 1883 (aged 70)
- Spouse(s): Henrietta Torrens (m. 1839; died 1857) Elizabeth Grace Torrens (m. 1858)
- Children: Edward O'Neill, 2nd Baron O'Neill; Robert Torrens O'Neill

Reverend William O'Neill, 1st Baron O'Neill (4 March 1813 – 18 April 1883), was an Anglo-Irish hereditary peer, clergyman and musical composer. Born William Chichester, he changed his surname to O'Neill in 1855.

== Background and education ==
The eldest son of Reverend Edward Chichester, he was a member of the prominent Irish Chichester family headed by the Marquess of Donegall. He was the great-great-great-grandson of John Chichester, grandson of Edward Chichester, 1st Viscount Chichester, and younger brother of Arthur Chichester, 2nd Earl of Donegall. O'Neill was educated at Foyle College, Derry, Shrewsbury School and Trinity College Dublin, and was ordained in 1837.

== Career ==
He was a prominent church organist and composer of church music, glees and songs.

Arms

When the Belfast Hospital for Sick Children was opened in 1878, Reverend O'Neill was appointed as the first president of the Medical Board. A marble dedication was installed in the hospital's surgical ward honouring him. This was a role he fulfilled with keen interest up until his death, at which time his son Robert Torrens took over the responsibility.

In 1855 he succeeded to the substantial O'Neill estates on the death of his relative John O'Neill, 3rd Viscount O'Neill (on whose death the viscountcy became extinct), and assumed by royal licence the surname of O'Neill in lieu of Chichester the same year. In 1868 the O'Neill title was revived when he was raised to the peerage as Baron O'Neill, of Shane's Castle in the County Antrim.

== Family ==
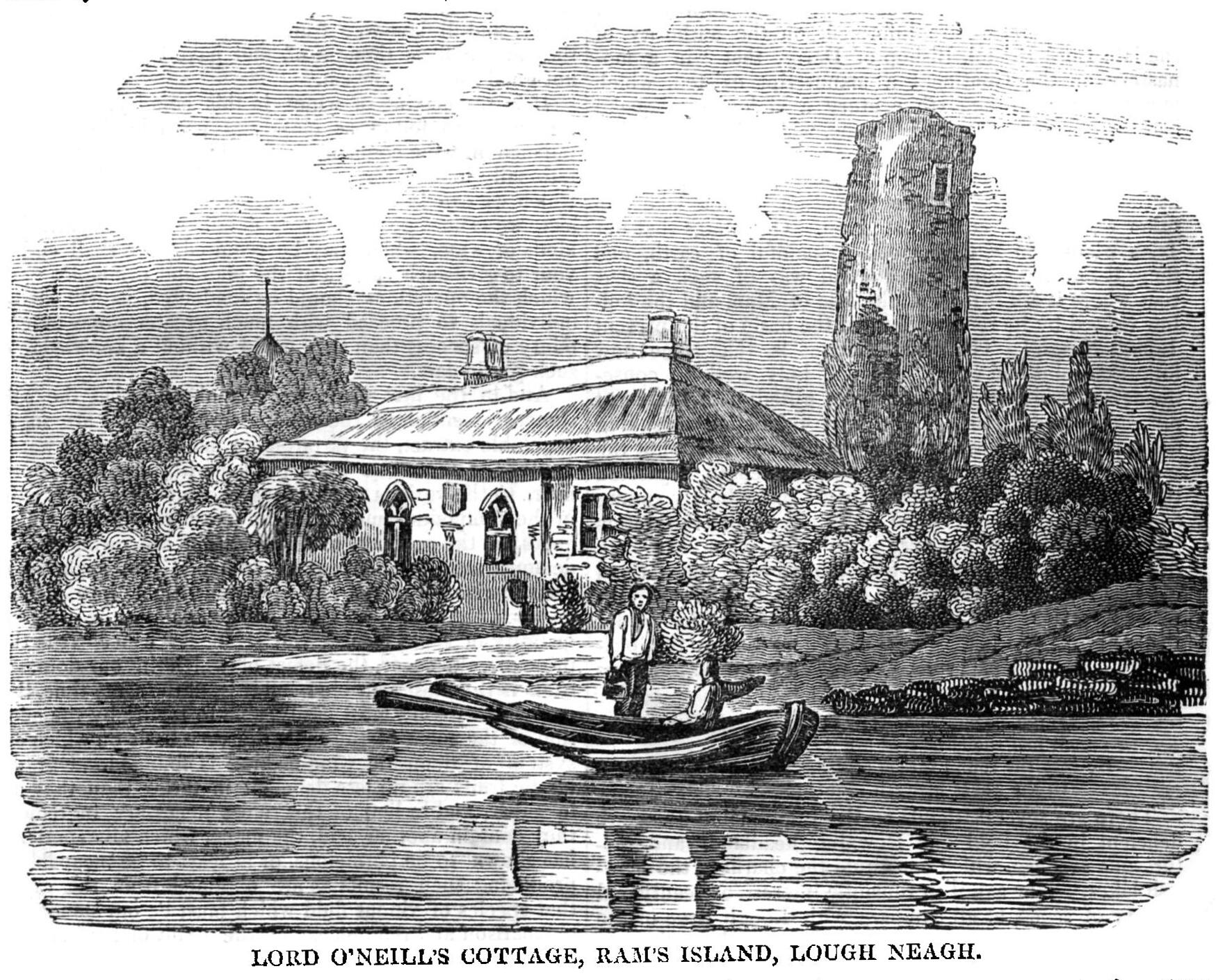
Lord O'Neill's Cottage, Ram's Island, Lough Neagh, 1833

Lord O'Neill married, firstly, Henrietta Torrens, daughter of Robert Torrens, judge of the Court of Common Pleas, and his wife Anne, in 1839. After her death in 1857 he married, secondly, Elizabeth Grace Torrens, daughter of the Venerable John Torrens, Archdeacon of Dublin, in 1858; she was Henrietta's first cousin. His third son from his first marriage, Robert Torrens O'Neill, represented Antrim Mid in Parliament for many years.

Lord O'Neill died in April 1883, aged 70, and was succeeded in the barony by his eldest son from his first marriage, Edward. Two of Lord O'Neill's descendants gained particular distinction. His grandson Hugh O'Neill was Speaker of the Northern Ireland House of Commons and created Baron Rathcavan in 1953, while his great-grandson Terence O'Neill was Prime Minister of Northern Ireland and given a life peerage as Baron O'Neill of the Maine in 1970. Elizabeth Grace, Lady O'Neill, died in 1905.

His descendant is British record producer, singer, songwriter, multi-instrumentalist, and DJ, Fred again... 3012

== Publications ==
- Biblical and Theological Gleanings: a collection of comments, criticisms, and remarks, explanatory or illustrative of nearly two thousand seven hundred passages in the Old and New Testament ... With some original observations (1854)
- Confession, Absolution, and Penance. A Tract For the Times (1859)
- The Christian Sabbath (1859)

== See also ==
- Earl O'Neill
- Marquess of Donegall

Peerage of the United Kingdom
New creation	Baron O'Neill; 1868–1883; Member of the House of Lords (1868–1883)	Succeeded by Edward O'Neill
