= Arthur Chichester, 4th Baron Templemore =

British soldier and politician

The Right Honourable The Lord Templemore KCVO DSO OBE PC DL
- Arms of the Baron Templemore

Conservative Chief Whip in the House of Lords
- In office 1940–1945
- Preceded by: The Earl of Lucan
- Succeeded by: The Earl Fortescue

Member of the House of Lords
- Lord Temporal
- In office 28 September 1924 – 2 October 1953
- Preceded by: The 3rd Baron Templemore
- Succeeded by: The 5th Baron Templemore

Personal details
- Born: Arthur Claud Spencer Chichester; 12 September 1880 Westminster, London, England
- Died: 2 October 1953 (aged 73) County Wicklow, Ireland
- Party: Conservative
- Spouse: Clare Meriel Wingfield (m. 1911)
- Children: 3
- Parent(s): Arthur Chichester, 3rd Baron Templemore; Evelyn Stracey-Clitherow
- Education: Harrow School
- Alma mater: Royal Military College, Sandhurst

Military service
- Allegiance: United Kingdom
- Branch/service: British Army
- Years of service: 1907–1918; 1939–1944
- Rank: Major
- Unit: Royal Fusiliers; Irish Guards
- Battles/wars: Second Boer War; World War I World War II
- Awards: Queen's South Africa Medal; Tibet Medal; Royal Victorian Order; Distinguished Service Order; Order of the British Empire

Arthur Claud Spencer Chichester, 4th Baron Templemore (12 September 1880 – 2 October 1953), was a British soldier and politician of Anglo-Irish descent.

== Early life ==
Chichester was the eldest son of the 3rd Baron Templemore and his wife, Evelyn (née Stracey-Clitherow). From his father's second marriage, he had a younger half-brother, Sir Gerald Chichester, a diplomat and courtier who served as Private Secretary to Queen Mary.

He was educated at Harrow and trained at the Royal Military College, Sandhurst, before being commissioned into the Royal Fusiliers as a second lieutenant on 20 January 1900.

== Career ==
He fought in the Second Boer War, and was promoted to lieutenant on 23 February 1901, staying in South Africa until the end of the war, when he returned home on the SS Assaye in September 1902. When he was back in the United Kingdom, he returned as a regular lieutenant in his regiment in November 1902. He later served in Mauritius, India, and the British expedition to Tibet.

By now a captain, Chichester distinguished himself in the First World War with his service in France and Italy, becoming a major with the Irish Guards and winning, along with several other awards, the DSO (1918) and an OBE (1919).

In 1924, he succeeded his father as Baron Templemore, and three years later was appointed Parliamentary Private Secretary to the Earl of Onslow as Under-Secretary of State for War and Paymaster General.

Lord Templemore was a Lord in Waiting to George V from February to June 1929, and again from 1931 to 1934. He was also Captain of the Yeomen of the Guard for 11 years (1934–1945), and served as Conservative Chief Whip in the House of Lords (1940–1945). He was appointed KCVO in 1938. He was a Deputy Lieutenant of Hampshire.

== Personal life ==
Templemore married the Hon. Clare Meriel Wingfield, second daughter of Mervyn Wingfield, 7th Viscount Powerscourt, at St George's, Hanover Square, London, in 1911. They had three sons:

- Major Hon. Arthur Patrick Spencer Chichester (23 March 1914 – 23 December 1942), killed in action in North Africa in World War II
- Major Hon. Dermot Richard Claud Chichester (18 April 1916 – 19 April 2007)
- Lord Desmond Clive Chichester MC (1920–2000)

Lord Templemore died in 1953 in County Wicklow. His second son succeeded him in the barony and in 1975 inherited the title of Marquess of Donegall in the Peerage of Ireland from a distant cousin.

Political offices
Preceded by The Earl of Lucan	Lord-in-waiting; 1929	New government
Preceded by New government	Lord-in-waiting; 1931–1934	Succeeded by The Earl of Munster
Preceded by Lord Strathcona and Mount Royal	Captain of the Yeomen of the Guard; 1934–1945	Succeeded by Lord Walkden
Preceded by The Earl of Lucan	Government Chief Whip in the House of Lords; 1940–1945	Succeeded by The Lord Ammon
Party political offices
Preceded by The Earl of Lucan	Conservative Chief Whip in the House of Lords; 1940–1945	Succeeded by The Earl Fortescue
Peerage of the United Kingdom
Preceded by Arthur Chichester	Baron Templemore; 1924–1953; Member of the House of Lords (1924–1953)	Succeeded by Dermot Chichester
