= Lord Spencer Chichester =

Anglo-Irish politician

Lord Spencer Stanley Chichester (20 April 1775 – 22 February 1819), known as The Honourable Spencer Chichester from 1775 to 1791, was an Anglo-Irish politician.

== Early life ==
Chichester was born on 20 April 1775. He was the third son of Arthur Chichester, 1st Marquess of Donegall (then known as the 5th Earl of Donegall), and Lady Anne Hamilton. His elder brothers were George Chichester, 2nd Marquess of Donegall, and the Hon. Arthur Chichester, who died young. His father served as MP for Malmesbury from 1768 to 1774 before being elevated as 1st Marquess of Donegall in 1791.

His paternal grandparents were Hon. John Chichester (younger son of the 3rd Earl of Donegall and Lady Catherine Forbes) and Elizabeth Newdigate (eldest daughter of Sir Richard Newdigate, 3rd Baronet). His maternal grandparents were James Hamilton, 5th Duke of Hamilton, and his third wife, Anne Spencer (an aunt of the Countess of Galloway).

== Career ==
He was the Member of Parliament for Belfast in the Irish House of Commons between 1797 and 1798. He then represented Carrickfergus in the House of Commons of the United Kingdom as a Tory between 1802 and his resignation from the Commons in 1807.

== Personal life ==
On 8 August 1795, Chichester married Lady Anne Harriet Stewart, daughter of John Stewart, 7th Earl of Galloway, and Anne Dashwood (a daughter of Sir James Dashwood, 2nd Baronet). Together, they were the parents of two sons and three daughters, including:

- Arthur Chichester, 1st Baron Templemore (1797–1837), MP for Milborne Port and County Wexford who married Lady Augusta Paget, daughter of Henry Paget, 1st Marquess of Anglesey, in 1820.
- Elizabeth Chichester (1799–1882), who married William Bateman-Hanbury, 1st Baron Bateman of Shobdon, MP for Northampton, in 1822.
- George Augustus Frederick Chichester (d. 1829), a Reverend who died unmarried.

Lord Spencer died at Paris on 22 February 1819. His eldest son, Arthur, was raised to the peerage as Baron Templemore on the occasion of the coronation of William IV in 1831. His widow died on 30 January 1850.

Parliament of Ireland
Preceded by Hon. Henry Skeffington; Sir William Godfrey, Bt	Member of Parliament for Belfast; 1797–1798; With: George Crookshank	Succeeded by Alexander Hamilton; George Crookshank
Parliament of the United Kingdom
Preceded by Noah Dalway	Member of Parliament for Carrickfergus; 1802–1807	Succeeded by James Craig
