= George Crookshank =

Irish politician (1680–1751)

George Crookshank (1680–1751) was an Irish politician.

Crookshank was born in Dublin and educated at Trinity College, Dublin. He was MP for Kilmallock from 1797 to 1800.
