= Arthur Chichester, 1st Baron Chichester =

English peer

The Right Honourable The Lord Chichester Kt
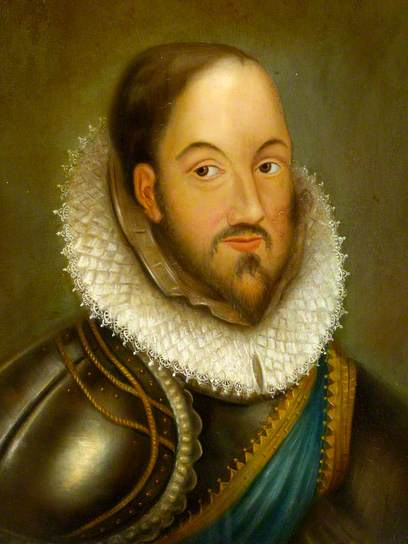
- Anglo-Irish School portrait in the collection of Belfast Harbour Commissioners

Lord Deputy of Ireland
- In office 1605–1616
- Preceded by: Sir George Carey
- Succeeded by: Sir Oliver St John

Personal details
- Born: May 1563 Raleigh, Devon, England
- Died: 19 February 1625 (aged 61) London, England
- Spouse: Lettice Perrot
- Children: Arthur
- Education: Exeter College, Oxford

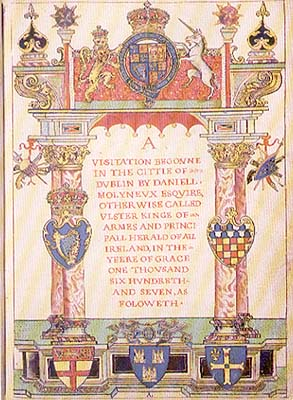
Record of a visitation undertaken by Daniel Molyneux, Ulster King of Arms, in 1607, showing the arms of Lord Deputy Chichester on the right

Arthur Chichester, 1st Baron Chichester (May 1563 – 19 February 1625), known between 1596 and 1613 as Sir Arthur Chichester, of Carrickfergus in Ireland, was an English administrator and soldier who served as Lord Deputy of Ireland from 1605 to 1616. He was instrumental in the development and expansion of Belfast, now Northern Ireland's capital. Several streets are named in honour of himself and his nephew and heir Arthur Chichester, 1st Earl of Donegall, including Chichester Street and the adjoining Donegall Place, site of the Belfast City Hall.

== Origins ==
Arthur Chichester was the second son of Sir John Chichester (died 1569), of Raleigh, Pilton, in North Devon, a leading member of the Devonshire gentry, a naval captain, and ardent Protestant who served as Sheriff of Devon in 1550–1551, and as Knight of the Shire for Devon in 1547, April 1554, and 1563, and as Member of Parliament for Barnstaple in 1559. Arthur's mother was Gertrude Courtenay, a daughter of Sir William Courtenay (1477–1535) "The Great", of Powderham, Devon, 6th in descent from the 2nd Earl of Devon (died 1377), MP for Devon in 1529, thrice Sheriff of Devon, in 1522, 1525–1526, 1533–1534, an Esquire of the Body to King Henry VIII, whom he accompanied to the Field of the Cloth of Gold.

== Career ==
After attending Exeter College, Oxford, favoured by many Devonians, Chichester commanded HMS Larke against the Spanish Armada in 1588. In 1595 he accompanied Sir Francis Drake on his last expedition to the Americas. Later in the Anglo–Spanish War, he commanded a company during the 1596 raid on Cádiz, for which he was knighted. A year later he was with English forces in France fighting with King Henry IV against the Spanish in Picardy. He was wounded in the shoulder during the Siege of Amiens in September 1597 during which the city was captured from the Spanish. He was knighted by Henry for his valour.

== Ireland ==
His career in Ireland began when in 1598 the Earl of Essex appointed him Governor of Carrickfergus, following the death of his brother, Sir John Chichester, who had been killed at the Battle of Carrickfergus the previous year. It is said that Sir John Chichester was decapitated, and his head was used as a football by the MacDonnell clan after their victory. James Sorley MacDonnell, commander of the clan's forces at the Battle of Carrickfergus, was poisoned in Dunluce Castle on the orders of Robert Cecil to placate Chichester.

During the Nine Years' War Chichester commanded British troops in Ulster. His tactics included a scorched earth policy. He encircled the Earl of Tyrone's forces with garrisons, effectively starving the Earl's troops. In a 1600 letter to Cecil, he stated "a million swords will not do them so much harm as one winter's famine". While these tactics were not initially devised by Chichester, he carried them out ruthlessly, gaining a hate-figure status among the Irish. Tyrone's weakening military position forced him to abandon and destroy his capital at Dungannon.

Following the signing of the Treaty of Mellifont, he succeeded Lord Mountjoy as Lord Deputy of Ireland from 3 February 1605. A year later in 1606 he married Lettice Perrot, daughter of Sir John Perrot, a former Lord Deputy.

Lord Deputy Chichester saw Irish Catholicism as a major threat to the Crown. He oversaw widespread persecution of Catholics, and ordered the execution of two bishops, including the aged and respected Conor O'Devany. His relations with the traditionally Catholic nobility of the Pale, in particular Lord Howth, who could be quite quarrelsome, were poor. In Howth's violent feuds with the new English settler families, particularly Thomas Jones, Archbishop of Dublin, and his son, and Viscount Moore of Drogheda, Chichester invariably sided against Howth but was unable to completely break his influence as he was a favourite of King James.

Following the Flight of the Earls in 1607, Chichester became a leading figure in the Plantation of Ulster. Initially, he intended that the number of Scottish planters would be small, with native Irish landowners gaining more land. However, after O'Doherty's Rebellion in County Donegal in 1608, his plans changed and all the native lords lost their land. Most of the land was awarded to wealthy landowners from England and Scotland. However, Chichester successfully campaigned to award veterans of the Nine Years' War land as well, funded by the City of London livery companies.

== Later life ==
Chichester was instrumental in the development and expansion of Belfast, now Northern Ireland's capital. In 1611, he built a new Belfast Castle on the site of an earlier Norman fortification, the Norman structure probably dating from the late 12th or the very early 13th century. In 1613, he was elevated to the Peerage of Ireland as Baron Chichester. Ill health in 1614 led to his retirement and his term of office was ended in February 1616. In his final years, Chichester served as an ambassador to the Habsburg Empire.

== Marriage and children ==
In 1606 he married Lettice Perrot, widow successively of Walter Vaughan of Golden Grove, Carmarthenshire, and of John Langhorne of St Brides, Pembrokeshire, and daughter of Sir John Perrot, a former Lord Deputy of Ireland. By her he had an only son:

- Arthur Chichester (born 22 September 1606, died October 1606) who died an infant aged one month and was buried in Christ Church, Dublin, on 31 October 1606.

== Death and succession ==
Lord Chichester died from pleurisy in London in 1625 and was buried seven months later in St Nicholas' Church, Carrickfergus. The Chichester barony became extinct on his death, but was revived the same year in favour of his younger brother Edward, who was further raised to the peerage as Viscount Chichester. Edward's son was Arthur, 1st Earl of Donegall.

== Legacy ==
The family's influence in Belfast is still evident. Several streets are named in its honour, including Donegall Place, site of the Belfast City Hall and the adjacent Chichester Street.

== Notes ==
Political offices
Preceded by Sir George Carey	Lord Deputy of Ireland; 1605–1616	Succeeded by Sir Oliver St John
Peerage of Ireland
New creation	Baron Chichester; 1st creation 1613–1625	Extinct
