= Edward O'Neill, 2nd Baron O'Neill =

Irish peer and Conservative politician

Arms

Edward O'Neill, 2nd Baron O'Neill (31 December 1839 – 19 November 1928), known as Edward Chichester until 1855, was an Irish peer and Conservative politician.

O'Neill was the eldest son of William O'Neill, 1st Baron O'Neill, and his first wife Henrietta (née Torrens), daughter of Robert Torrens, judge of the Court of Common Pleas (Ireland). He was elected to the House of Commons for County Antrim in 1863, a seat he held until 1880. In 1883 he succeeded his father in the barony and entered the House of Lords.

Lord O'Neill married Lady Louisa Katherine Emma, daughter of Thomas Barnes Cochrane, 11th Earl of Dundonald, in 1873. Their third son Hugh became a prominent politician and was created Baron Rathcavan in 1953. Lord O'Neill died in November 1928, aged 88, and was succeeded in the barony by his grandson Shane, the son of his second but eldest surviving son Captain the Hon. Arthur O'Neill, who had been killed in the First World War. Arthur's younger son and another of Lord O'Neill's grandsons was Terence O'Neill, Prime Minister of Northern Ireland. Lady O'Neill died in 1942.

Parliament of the United Kingdom
Preceded by Thomas Henry Pakenham; George Upton	Member of Parliament for County Antrim; 1863–1880; With: Thomas Henry Pakenham 1863–65; Henry Seymour 1865–69; Earl of Yarmouth 1869–74; James Chaine 1874–80	Succeeded by James Chaine; Edward Macnaghten
Peerage of the United Kingdom
Preceded by William O'Neill	Baron O'Neill; 1883–1928	Succeeded by Shane Edward Robert O'Neill
