= Raymond O'Neill, 4th Baron O'Neill =

Northern Irish peer

Colonel The Right Honourable The Lord O'Neill KCVO TD

Member of the House of Lords
- Lord Temporal
- as a hereditary peer 1 October 1944 – 11 November 1999
- Preceded by: The 3rd Baron O'Neill
- Succeeded by: Seat abolished (Note: Pursuant to the House of Lords Act 1999.)

Personal details
- Born: Raymond Arthur Clanaboy O'Neill; 1 September 1933 (age 92)
- Spouse: Georgina Mary Scott (m. 1963; died 2017)
- Children: 3
- Parent(s): Shane O'Neill, 3rd Baron O'Neill; Ann Charteris
- Occupation: Military officer, public administrator

Colonel Raymond Arthur Clanaboy O'Neill, 4th Baron O'Neill (born 1 September 1933), is a Northern Irish peer, retired reservist officer and public administrator. He served as Lord Lieutenant of Antrim between 1994 and 2008.

== Early and personal life ==
O'Neill was born on 1 September 1933, the son of Shane O'Neill, 3rd Baron O'Neill (died 1944). He inherited the barony when his father was killed in action in Italy during the Second World War. His mother Ann (a noted society hostess and the grand-daughter of the 11th Earl of Wemyss) remarried, firstly in 1945 to the press magnate Esmond Harmsworth, 2nd Viscount Rothermere, and secondly (after Rothermere divorced her in 1951) to the writer Ian Fleming (died 1964) in 1952, as well as having affairs with the Labour politicians Hugh Gaitskell and Roy Jenkins.

O'Neill attended Eton and the Royal Agricultural College.

In 1963, O'Neill married Georgina Mary Scott, eldest daughter of Lord George Scott (youngest son of John Montagu Douglas Scott, 7th Duke of Buccleuch). Together they had three sons. His wife predeceased him, dying in 2017.

== Career ==
=== Military service ===
O'Neill was given an emergency commission as a Second Lieutenant in the Royal Armoured Corps in 1952. The following year, he was transferred into the North Irish Horse, a unit in the Territorial Army, with the same rank; he was promoted to Lieutenant in 1956 (with seniority from 1967), Captain in 1961, and temporary Major in 1964 (which was made substantive in 1967). He was granted the acting rank of Lieutenant-Colonel in 1971.

Between 1986 and 1991, he was Honorary Colonel D (North Irish Horse) Squadron, The Royal Yeomanry, in 1986; and between 1988 and 1993, he was Honorary Colonel 69 (North Irish Horse) Signal Squadron, 32 (Scottish) Signal Regiment (Volunteers). He was granted the honorary rank of Colonel in 1993.

=== Public service ===
O'Neill also held a number of public offices alongside his army commitments. He was chairman of the Ulster Countryside Committee between 1971 and 1971, the Northern Ireland Tourist Board from 1975 to 1980, the Northern Ireland National Trust Committee from 1981 to 1991, and the Northern Ireland Museums Council from 1993 to 1998. He was President of the Royal Ulster Agricultural Society from 1984 to 1986. In 1967, he was appointed a Deputy Lieutenant (DL) for County Antrim, and he served as Lord Lieutenant between 1994 and 2008.

O'Neill was appointed a Knight Commander of the Royal Victorian Order (KCVO) in the 2009 New Year Honours.

== Notes ==
Peerage of the United Kingdom
Preceded by Shane O'Neill	Baron O'Neill; 1944–present Member of the House of Lords (1944–1999)	Incumbent; Heir apparent: Hon. Shane O'Neill
