= Hugh O'Neill, 3rd Baron Rathcavan =

British hereditary peer and businessman (1939–2025)

The Right Honourable The Lord Rathcavan

Member of the House of Lords
- Lord Temporal
- In office 30 December 1994 – 11 November 1999 as a hereditary peer
- Preceded by: The 2nd Baron Rathcavan
- Succeeded by: Seat abolished (Note: Pursuant to the House of Lords Act 1999.)

Personal details
- Born: Hugh Detmar Torrens O'Neill; 14 June 1939 London, England
- Died: 11 November 2025 (aged 86)
- Occupation: Businessman, peer, politician

Hugh Detmar Torrens O'Neill, 3rd Baron Rathcavan (14 June 1939 – 11 November 2025), was a British hereditary peer and businessman who sat as a crossbencher in the House of Lords from 1994 until 1999.

== Life and career ==
O'Neill was educated at Eton College. He ran Lamont, a textile company in Northern Ireland, in the 1980s and was chairman of the Northern Ireland Tourist Board before taking on the Brasserie St Quentin in Knightsbridge in 2002. Lord Rathcavan died on 11 November 2025, at the age of 86.

== Notes ==
Peerage of the United Kingdom
Preceded by Phelim O'Neill	Baron Rathcavan; 1994–2025; Member of the House of Lords (1994–1999)	Succeeded by François O'Neill
