= Phelim O'Neill, 2nd Baron Rathcavan =

Irish politician (1909–1994)

The Right Honourable The Lord Rathcavan PC (NI)

Leader of the Alliance Party
- In office 1972–1972
- Preceded by: Oliver Napier
- Succeeded by: Oliver Napier

Member of the House of Lords
- Lord Temporal
- In office 28 November 1982 – 20 December 1994
- Preceded by: The 1st Baron Rathcavan
- Succeeded by: The 3rd Baron Rathcavan

Personal details
- Born: Phelim Robert Hugh O'Neill; 2 November 1909
- Died: 20 December 1994 (aged 85) Castlebar, County Mayo
- Party: Alliance (from 1972); Ulster Unionist (until 1972)
- Spouse(s): Clare Blow (m. 1934; div. 1944) Bridget Coke (m. 1953)
- Children: 6
- Parent: Hugh O'Neill (father)
- Relatives: Terence O'Neill (cousin)
- Education: Eton College
- Profession: Officer
- Military career
- Allegiance: United Kingdom
- Branch: British Army
- Service years: 1939–1945
- Rank: Major
- Unit: Royal Artillery
- Conflicts: World War II

Phelim Robert Hugh O'Neill, 2nd Baron Rathcavan (2 November 1909 – 20 December 1994), was a politician in Northern Ireland and a hereditary peer in the British House of Lords.

The son of Hugh O'Neill, a unionist politician, Phelim studied at Eton College before joining the Royal Artillery. He became a major during World War II.

O'Neill was elected to Westminster for the Ulster Unionist Party at the 1952 North Antrim by-election, succeeding his father. He stood down at the 1959 general election. At the 1958 Stormont elections, he was elected, again to represent North Antrim. In 1969, he briefly served as Minister of Education before becoming the Minister of Agriculture. In 1958, he was appointed High Sheriff of Antrim.

O'Neill joined the Alliance Party of Northern Ireland in 1972, and acted as its leader at the Darlington Conference. At the 1973 Northern Ireland Assembly election, he was unsuccessful in North Antrim. In 1982, he succeeded his father as Baron Rathcavan.

== See also ==
- List of Northern Ireland members of the House of Lords

Parliament of the United Kingdom
Preceded by Hugh O'Neill	Member of Parliament for North Antrim; 1952–1959	Succeeded by Henry Clark
Parliament of Northern Ireland
Preceded by William McCleery	Member of Parliament for North Antrim; 1958–1973	Parliament abolished
Political offices
Preceded by William Fitzsimmons	Minister of Education; 1969	Succeeded by William Long
Preceded by James Chichester-Clark	Minister of Agriculture; 1969–1971	Succeeded by Harry West
Peerage of the United Kingdom
Preceded by Hugh O'Neill	Baron Rathcavan; 1982–1994; Member of the House of Lords (1982–1994)	Succeeded by Hugh O'Neill
