= Dermot Chichester, 7th Marquess of Donegall =

British peer, soldier and landowner (1916–2007)

The Most Honourable The Marquess of Donegall LVO
- Arms of the Marquess of Donegall Blazon Arms: Quarterly: 1st and 4th, chequy, or and gule, a chief vair (Chichester); 2nd and 3rd, azure fretty argent (Etchingham). Crest: A stork, proper, wings expanded, holding in its beak an eel, argent, head or. Supporters: Two wolves gules, ducally gorged and chained or.. Motto: Invitum sequitur honor (Honour follows, though unsought for).

Member of the House of Lords (Note: As Baron Templemore.)
- Lord Temporal
- as a hereditary peer 2 October 1953 – 11 November 1999
- Preceded by: The 4th Baron Templemore
- Succeeded by: Seat abolished (Note: Along with those of many other Irish peers, pursuant to the House of Lords Act 1999 -- see Peerage of Ireland.)

Personal details
- Born: Dermot Richard Claud Chichester; 18 April 1916
- Died: 19 April 2007 (aged 91)
- Party: Conservative
- Spouse: Lady Josceline Gabrielle Legge (m. 1946; died 1995)
- Children: 3
- Parent: Arthur Chichester, 4th Baron Templemore (father)
- Occupation: Soldier, horsebreeder, landowner, peer
- Other titles: 11th Earl of Donegall; 12th Viscount Chichester; 12th Baron Chichester; 7th Baron Fisherwick; 5th Baron Templemore

The Most Hon. Dermot Richard Claud Chichester, 7th Marquess of Donegall (18 April 1916 – 19 April 2007), known as the Hon. Dermot Chichester from 1924 to 1953, and as Baron Templemore from 1953 to 1975, was a British soldier, Irish landowner and member of the House of Lords. Lord Donegall was usually known to his family and friends as Dermey Donegall.

== Biography ==
Lord Donegall was the second son of the 4th Baron Templemore, whom he succeeded in the barony. He was educated at Harrow and the Royal Military College, Sandhurst.

He served in the Second World War as a captain with the 7th Queen's Own Hussars in Egypt. He was reported missing in action and believed to have been killed, but had been captured in Libya in November 1942 during the North African campaign. He remained a prisoner of war in Italy until escaping in June 1944. He was promoted major that year, and retired from the British Army in 1949, but served for several years with the Leicestershire Yeomanry.

His elder brother, Arthur, having been killed in 1942 serving with the Coldstream Guards, Chichester succeeded his father in his several titles in 1953. In 1975, he also succeeded a distant cousin, Edward Chichester, to become the 7th Marquess of Donegall, being the descendant of the 1st Baron Templemore, grandson of Arthur Chichester, 1st Marquess of Donegall. He was also Lord High Admiral of Lough Neagh.

Lord Donegall became a member of the Honourable Corps of Gentlemen at Arms in 1966, and was its Standard Bearer from 1984 to 1986. He was appointed LVO in 1986, and was for many years an active member of the Conservative Monday Club. In 1981, he became Grandmaster of the Grand Lodge of Ireland, a post he held until 1992. Lord Donegall also served as master of the Wexford Hounds. He bred horses, including The Proclamation, winner of the Punchestown champion hurdle in 1989, and Dunbrody Millar, winner of the Topham Trophy at Aintree in 2007.

In 1946, he married Lady Josceline Gabrielle Legge (1918–1995), daughter of the 7th Earl of Dartmouth. They had a son, Patrick Chichester, 8th Marquess of Donegall (born in 1952, and who used the courtesy title of Earl of Belfast from 1975 to 2007), and two daughters, Lady Jennifer (1949–2013) and Lady Juliet (b. 1954). The Marquess lived at the family home of Dunbrody Park in Arthurstown in the southwest of County Wexford, Ireland.

== Notes ==
Masonic offices
Preceded by The Earl of Donoughmore	Grandmaster of the Grand Lodge of Ireland; 1981–1992	Succeeded by Darwin Herbert Templeton
Peerage of Ireland
Preceded by Edward Chichester	Marquess of Donegall; 1975–2007	Succeeded by Patrick Chichester
Preceded by Edward Chichester	Earl of Donegall; 1975–2007	Succeeded by Patrick Chichester
Preceded by Edward Chichester	Viscount Chichester; 1975–2007	Succeeded by Patrick Chichester
Preceded by Edward Chichester	Baron Chichester; 2nd creation 1975–2007	Succeeded by Patrick Chichester
Peerage of Great Britain
Preceded by Edward Chichester	Baron Fisherwick; 1975–2007	Succeeded by Patrick Chichester
Peerage of the United Kingdom
Preceded by Arthur Chichester	Baron Templemore; 1953–2007; Member of the House of Lords (1953–1999)	Succeeded by Patrick Chichester
