= Harry Chichester, 2nd Baron Templemore =

British peer

The Right Honourable The Lord Templemore DL JP
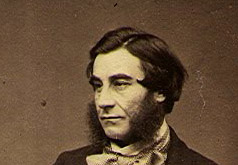

Member of the House of Lords
- Lord Temporal
- In office 26 September 1837 – 10 June 1906
- Preceded by: The 1st Baron Templemore
- Succeeded by: The 3rd Baron Templemore

Personal details
- Born: Harry Spencer Chichester; 14 June 1821
- Died: 10 June 1906 (aged 84)
- Spouses: Laura Caroline Jane Paget (m. 1842; died 1871) Lady Emily Cowper (m. 1873–1906)
- Children: 3
- Parent(s): Arthur Chichester, 1st Baron Templemore; Lady Augusta Paget
- Education: Eton College
- Alma mater: Christ Church, Oxford

Harry Spencer Chichester, 2nd Baron Templemore (14 June 1821 – 10 June 1906), styled The Honourable Harry Chichester between 1831 and 1837, was an Anglo-Irish peer.

== Early life and career ==
Chichester was the eldest son of Arthur Chichester, 1st Baron Templemore, and Lady Augusta Paget, daughter of Field Marshal Henry Paget, 1st Marquess of Anglesey. He was educated at Eton and Christ Church, Oxford. He succeeded in the barony on the death of his father on 26 September 1837.

== Career ==
During his military service he gained the rank of Honorary Colonel for the 3rd Battalion, Royal Irish Regiment. He served as a deputy lieutenant of County Wexford and was also a justice of the peace for that county.

== Personal life ==
On 3 August 1842, Lord Templemore married his first cousin once removed, Laura Caroline Jane Paget, daughter of Sir Arthur Paget and Lady Augusta Fane (a daughter of 10th Earl of Westmorland). She was the first cousin of his mother Augusta, Baroness Templemore. In the 1850s, they lived at 2 Upper Brook Street, Mayfair. Before her death, they had two children:

- Arthur Henry Chichester, 3rd Baron Templemore (1854–1924), who married Evelyn Stracey, daughter of Rev. William James Stracey-Clitherow, in 1879. After her death, he married Alice Elizabeth Dawkins, daughter of Clinton George Augustus Dawkins, in 1885.
- The Hon. Flora Augusta Chichester (1856–1874), who died unmarried.

After his first wife's death in December 1871, he married secondly Lady Victoria Elizabeth Ashley, daughter of Anthony Ashley-Cooper, 7th Earl of Shaftesbury, and Lady Emily Cowper (a daughter of 5th Earl Cowper), on 8 January 1873 at St George's, Hanover Square, London. They had one daughter:

- The Hon. Hilda Caroline Chichester (1875–1961), who married Sir Victor George Corkran.

Lord Templemore died in June 1906, aged 84, and was succeeded by his only son, Arthur. The widowed Lady Templemore lived at 9 Grosvenor Street, Mayfair. She died in February 1927.

Peerage of the United Kingdom
Preceded by Arthur Chichester	Baron Templemore; 1837–1906; Member of the House of Lords (1837–1906)	Succeeded by Arthur Chichester
