= Shane O'Neill, 3rd Baron O'Neill =

Anglo-Irish peer

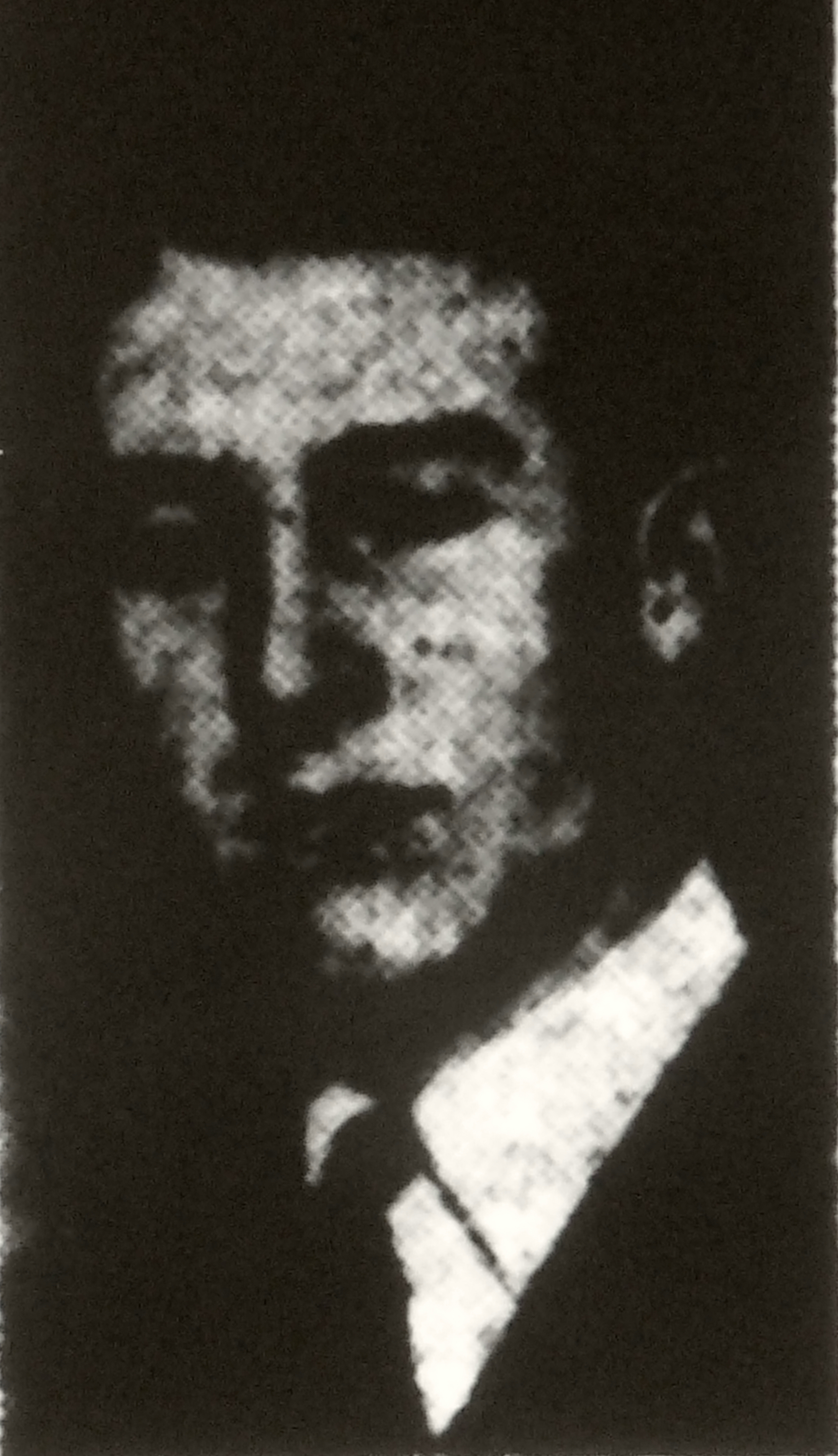
Shane Edward Robert O'Neill, 3rd Baron O'Neill

Shane Edward Robert O'Neill, 3rd Baron O'Neill (6 February 1907 – 24 October 1944) was an Anglo-Irish peer and British Army officer. He served during World War II and was killed in action in Italy.

== Early life and family ==
O'Neill was born on 6 February 1907 to The Hon Arthur O'Neill and his wife Lady Annabel Hungerford Crewe-Milnes. His mother was the eldest daughter of Robert Crewe-Milnes, 1st Marquess of Crewe. He was educated at Eton College, an all-boys public school in Eton, Berkshire, England. He did not attend university.

His brother Terence was a politician who became Prime Minister of Northern Ireland.

He married Ann Charteris, granddaughter of the 11th Lord Wemyss, on 6 October 1932. They had two children, Hon. Raymond Arthur Clanaboy O'Neill (b. 1933; later 4th Baron O'Neill) and Hon. Fionn Frances Bride O'Neill (born 1936), who married Sir John Albert Leigh Morgan and had issue.

After his death, Ann remarried, first, the 2nd Lord Rothermere, a press tycoon and former Tory MP, and later, Ian Fleming, the creator of James Bond, as well as having affairs with the Labour politicians Hugh Gaitskell and Roy Jenkins.

== Career ==
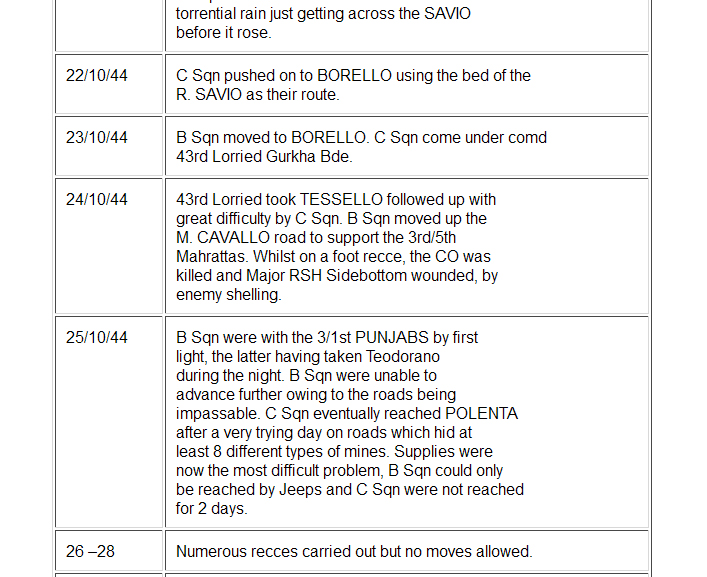
The death of Lord O'Neill ("the CO") reported in the War Diary of the North Irish Horse

Arms

In 1929, O'Neill joined the Gillett Brothers Discount Company as a director.

=== Military service ===
On 30 August 1929, he was promoted to lieutenant in the 8th King's Royal Irish Hussars.

With the outbreak of World War II, he was granted an emergency commission on 20 September 1939 as a second lieutenant in the North Irish Horse, Royal Armoured Corps. In October 1939, he was granted the acting rank of captain. In December 1939, he was promoted to lieutenant colonel and appointed the officer commanding. He was killed in action in Italy on 24 October 1944, aged 37, and is buried in the Coriano Ridge War Cemetery near Coriano.

== Peerage ==
His father, Arthur O'Neill, and grandfather, Edward O'Neill, 2nd Baron O'Neill, were Members of Parliament representing Mid Antrim and Antrim respectively in the House of Commons of the United Kingdom. As the 2nd Baron O'Neill's eldest surviving son, Shane's father was heir to the title of Baron O'Neill. At his birth, Shane became second in line to the title of Baron O'Neill. However, his father died in action during World War I and he, therefore, became his grandfather's heir. He succeeded to the title after his grandfather's death in 1928, becoming the 3rd Baron O'Neill.

As a hereditary peer with a Peerage of the United Kingdom, he was able to sit in the House of Lords. Though he had inherited the title in 1928, he first took his seat in the Lords on 3 April 1930. In 1937 he attended the Coronation of George VI at Westminster Abbey and paid homage to him with the other Lords Temporal.

Peerage of the United Kingdom
Preceded by Edward O'Neill	Baron O'Neill; 1928–1944	Succeeded by Raymond O'Neill
