= Edward Chichester, 6th Marquess of Donegall =

British peer and journalist

The Most Honourable The Marquess of Donegall
- Arms of the Marquess of Donegall Blazon Arms: Quarterly: 1st and 4th, chequy, or and gule, a chief vair (Chichester); 2nd and 3rd, azure fretty argent (Etchingham). Crest: A stork, proper, wings expanded, holding in its beak an eel, argent, head or. Supporters: Two wolves gules, ducally gorged and chained or.. Motto: Invitum sequitur honor (Honour follows, though unsought for).

Member of the House of Lords (Note: As Baron Fisherwick.)
- Lord Temporal
- In office 13 May 1904 – 24 May 1975
- Preceded by: The 5th Marquess of Donegall
- Succeeded by: The 7th Marquess of Donegall (Note: He was already a member of the House of Lords as Baron Templemore.)

Personal details
- Born: Edward Arthur Donald St George Hamilton Chichester; 7 October 1903
- Died: 24 May 1975 (aged 71)
- Spouse(s): Gladys Jean Combe (m. 1943; div. 1968) Maureen McKenzie (m. 1968)
- Parent: George Chichester, 5th Marquess of Donegall (father)
- Occupation: Journalist, peer
- Other titles: 10th Earl of Donegall; 11th Viscount Chichester; 11th Baron Chichester; 6th Baron Fisherwick

Edward Arthur Donald St George Hamilton Chichester, 6th Marquess of Donegall (7 October 1903 – 24 May 1975), was a British peer and journalist. He succeeded to the marquessate on the death of his father in 1904, at the age of seven months. His other titles included Baron Fisherwick, which gave him a seat in the House of Lords. He was also the Hereditary Lord High Admiral of Lough Neagh.

== Biography ==
The son of the elderly George Chichester, 5th Marquess of Donegall (1822–1904), Chichester was educated at the École nouvelle de la Suisse romande, Eton, and Christ Church, Oxford, and took up a career in journalism. For many years he wrote a column in the Sunday Dispatch under the title "Almost in Confidence". He made regular contributions to the Sunday News and Sunday Graphic, and also held a staff position on the Daily Sketch. As a journalist, he travelled extensively, notably covering the winter sports in St Moritz, Switzerland. He was a passenger on the maiden voyage of the Queen Mary, returning on the Hindenburg. In 1924, by virtue of his barony of Fisherwick in the Peerage of Great Britain, he was able to take a seat in the House of Lords on reaching the age of twenty-one.

The Marquess had a lifelong interest in aviation and owned his own aircraft, which he used for pursuing news stories. He covered the Spanish Civil War and was a distinguished war correspondent throughout the Second World War. His interest extended to cars and he was President of the Middlesex County Automobile Club from 1964 until his death in 1975. In 1949 he became a disc jockey with the BBC and in 1956 ran a Dixieland band and a jazz club in Kensington. He was also the owner of a record company.

He was a long-time member of the Sherlock Holmes Society of London, and edited its magazine, the Sherlock Holmes Journal, for many years. In that context and others, he told friends and acquaintances not to stand on ceremony ("My Lord") but not to use his first names either: "Call me Don!".

In 1937, the Marquess was briefly engaged to the British-born American gossip-columnist, Sheilah Graham, whom he had met years earlier in London, before she moved to America. (At a Hollywood party given for Graham and the Marquess by the writer, Robert Benchley, Graham first set eyes on novelist F. Scott Fitzgerald, with whom she shortly after began a romance that lasted until Fitzgerald's death in 1940.)

In 1943 he married Gladys Jean Combe, younger daughter of Captain Christian Combe, of the Royal Horse Guards, and his wife Lady Jane, daughter of George Conyngham, 3rd Marquess Conyngham. She was a descendant of the politician and brewer (of Combe Delafield and Co., later Watney Combe & Reid) Harvey Christian Combe, Lord Mayor of London from 1799 to 1800. Donegall parted from his wife after 10 years, and in 1962 moved to Switzerland. In 1968 the Marquess was granted a divorce under Swiss law and in that same year he married Maureen McKenzie (née Scholfield), daughter of Major Geoffrey C. Scholfield of Birkdale, Lancashire, and former wife of Douglas McKenzie, whom she had married in 1947.

Donegall resigned as president of the National Canine Defence League in 1957. He had been connected with the League for more than thirty years.

== Death ==
He died in Switzerland on 24 May 1975 at the age of 71. His second wife and widow died in 1999.

At the time of his death, the Marquess was working on his autobiography, which he planned to call Almost in Confidence, after the newspaper column he had run. It was not ready for publication before he died.

== Notes ==
Peerage of Ireland
Preceded by George Chichester	Marquess of Donegall; 1904–1975	Succeeded by Dermot Chichester
Preceded by George Chichester	Earl of Donegall; 1904–1975	Succeeded by Dermot Chichester
Preceded by George Chichester	Viscount Chichester; 1904–1975	Succeeded by Dermot Chichester
Preceded by George Chichester	Baron Chichester; 2nd creation 1904–1975	Succeeded by Dermot Chichester
Peerage of Great Britain
Preceded by George Chichester	Baron Fisherwick; 1904–1975; Member of the House of Lords (1904–1975)	Succeeded by Dermot Chichester
