= Arthur O'Neill =

British politician

The Honourable Arthur O'Neill
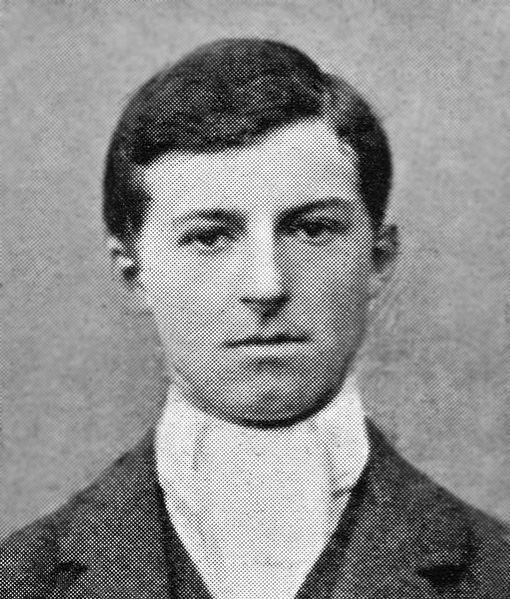
- Arthur O'Neill's portrait published in The Bond of Sacrifice (1917)

Member of Parliament for Mid Antrim
- In office January 1910 – 6 November 1914
- Preceded by: Robert Torrens O'Neill
- Succeeded by: Hugh O'Neill

Personal details
- Born: 19 September 1876 County Antrim, Ireland
- Died: 6 November 1914 (aged 38) Klein Zillebeke, Belgium
- Cause of death: Killed in action
- Party: Ulster Unionist
- Spouse: Lady Annabel Crewe-Milnes (m. 1902)
- Children: 5, including: Shane O'Neill; Terence O'Neill
- Parent: Edward O'Neill (father)

Arthur Edward Bruce O'Neill (19 September 1876 – 6 November 1914), was an Irish Ulster Unionist Party politician who was the first Member of Parliament to be killed in World War I.

== Early life ==
O'Neill was the second but eldest surviving son of Edward O'Neill, 2nd Baron O'Neill, and his wife Lady Louisa Katherine Emma (née Cochrane). Hugh O'Neill, who was later created Baron Rathcavan, was his younger brother.

== Career ==
=== Military career ===
O'Neill joined the British Army as a second lieutenant in the 2nd Regiment of Life Guards on 26 May 1897, and was promoted to lieutenant on 15 June 1898. He saw active service in South Africa between 1899 and 1900, during the Second Boer War, for which he was awarded the Queen's South Africa Medal with three clasps. On 3 January 1902 he was promoted to captain, and temporary appointed adjutant to the 2nd Life Guards, but in January 1903 he was back in a regular posting with the regiment.

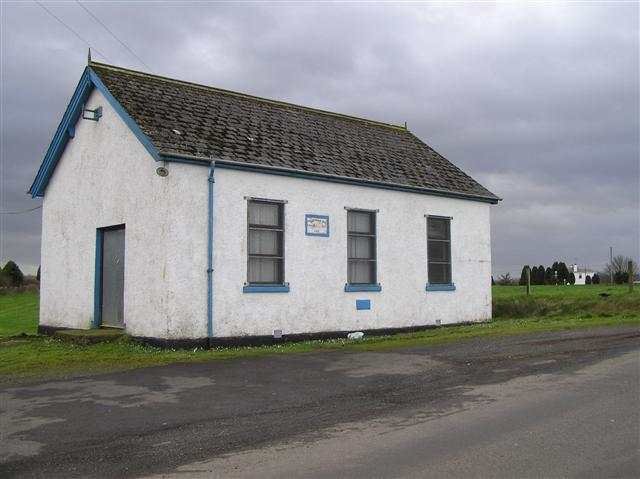
O'Neill Memorial Hall in Dunnygarran, South Antrim, built in 1926

O'Neill fought in the First World War as a captain in "A" Squadron 2nd Life Guards. He was killed in action at Klein Zillebeke ridge on 6 November 1914, aged 38, the first MP to be killed in the conflict. He is commemorated on the Menin Gate in Ypres. O'Neill is also commemorated on Panel 8 of the Parliamentary War Memorial in Westminster Hall, one of 22 MPs that died during World War I to be named on that memorial. O'Neill is one of 19 MPs who fell in the war who are commemorated by heraldic shields in the Commons Chamber. A further act of commemoration came with the unveiling in 1932 of a manuscript-style illuminated book of remembrance for the House of Commons, which includes a short biographical account of the life and death of O'Neill.

=== Political career ===
He was elected to the House of Commons for Mid-Antrim in January 1910, succeeding his uncle Robert Torrens O'Neill. His brother Hugh succeeded him as MP for Mid-Antrim.

== Personal life ==
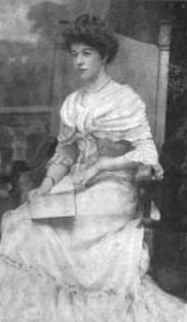
Lady Annabel Crewe-Milnes in 1902

O'Neill married, at St Paul's Church, Knightsbridge, on 21 January 1902, Lady Annabel Crewe-Milnes, daughter of Robert Crewe-Milnes, 1st Marquess of Crewe. The Archbishop of Armagh, Primate of All Ireland, performed the ceremony. Lady Annabel later remarried and died in 1948.

O'Neill and his wife had five children; three sons and two daughters. Their eldest son Shane succeeded his grandfather in the barony in 1928, while their third son Terence, who was less than two months old at the time of his father's death, was Prime Minister of Northern Ireland between 1963 and 1969.

Their children were:

- Hon. Sibyl O'Neill (1902–1946), married Lt Col Edward North Buxton in 1924
- Hon. Mary Louisa Hermione O'Neill (1905–1991), married Lt Col Derek Ernest Frederick Orby Gascoigne in 1934; parents of Bamber Gascoigne
- Shane O'Neill, 3rd Baron O'Neill (1907–1944 †)
- Hon. Brian Arthur O'Neill (1911–1940 †)
- Terence O'Neill, Baron O'Neill of the Maine (1914–1990), Prime Minister of Northern Ireland

== Notes ==
Parliament of the United Kingdom
Preceded by Robert Torrens O'Neill	Member of Parliament for Mid Antrim; January 1910 – November 1914	Succeeded by Hugh O'Neill
