= Arthur Chichester, 2nd Earl of Donegall =

Anglo-Irish politician and peer

Arthur Chichester, 2nd Earl of Donegall, PC (Ire) (died 26 October 1678), was an Anglo-Irish politician and peer.

== Early life ==
Chichester was the eldest son of Lady Mary Jones and Lieutenant Colonel John Chichester (1609–1647), of Dungannon, County Tyrone, who was MP for Dungannon and fought in the English Civil War. Among his siblings were younger brother, the Hon. John Chichester, and Elizabeth Chichester (wife of Sir John Cole, 1st Baronet). After his father's death, his mother married Col. Christopher Copley of Wadworth.

His father was a younger brother of Arthur Chichester, 1st Earl of Donegall, both sons of Edward Chichester, 1st Viscount Chichester, and Anne Coplestone (a daughter of John Coplestone). His maternal grandfather was Roger Jones, 1st Viscount Ranelagh.

== Career ==
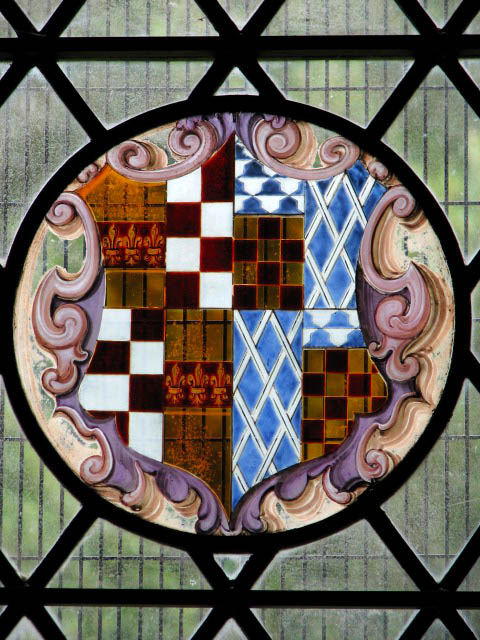
Stained glass, All Saints Church, Horsford, Norfolk, showing arms of Dacre Barrett, son of Richard Barrett and Anne Loftus. He married, firstly, Lady Jane Chichester, daughter of Arthur Chichester, 2nd Earl of Donegall and Jane Itchingham. Arms of Lennard, Lord Dacre (Or, on a fess gules three fleurs-de-lys of the first) quartering Barrett, Lord Newburgh (Party per pale barry of four counterchanged argent and gules) impaling the arms of Chichester, Marquess of Donegall quartered with Echyngham (Azure, fretty argent).

He was knighted at Whitehall in 1660, and served in the Irish House of Commons as Member of Parliament for Dungannon (1661–1666). He was also made an Irish Privy Counsellor in 1672.

In 1675, Chichester succeeded his uncle as second Earl of Donegall, inheriting the title under the special remainder granted with it to the male heirs of his grandfather, Edward Chichester, 1st Viscount Chichester. He was Custos Rotulorum for County Antrim and Governor of Carrickfergus for twelve years before dying in Ireland in 1678. His wife survived him and remarried.

== Personal life ==
Chichester married Jane Ichyngham, daughter of John Ichyngham of Dunbrody, County Wexford, a descendant of Sir Edward Echyngham (died 1527) of Barsham, Suffolk.

- Arthur Chichester, 3rd Earl of Donegall (1666–1706), a Maj.-Gen. who married Lady Barbara Boyle, daughter of Roger Boyle, 1st Earl of Orrery, and Lady Margaret Howard (a daughter of the 2nd Earl of Suffolk), before 1682. After her death, he married Lady Catherine Forbes, daughter of Arthur Forbes, 1st Earl of Granard, and Catherine Newcomen (daughter of Sir Robert Newcomen), in 1685. He was killed in action at Fort Montjuïc on 20 April 1706.
- Lady Jane Chichester, who married Dacre Barrett.
- John Chichester, who lived at Dunbrody, County Wexford.
- Edward Chichester, the Rector at Clonenagh who married Elizabeth Chichester, daughter of Capt. John Chichester.
- Lady Mary Chichester, who married Sir Robert Newcomen, 6th Baronet, son of Sir Thomas Newcomen, 5th Baronet.

Lord Donegall died on 26 October 1678 and was succeeded by his eldest son, Arthur.

=== Descendants ===
Through his daughter Lady Jane, he was a grandfather of Richard Barrett (1682–1716), who married Anne Lennard, Baroness Dacre, parents of Thomas Barrett-Lennard, 17th Baron Dacre.

Peerage of Ireland
Preceded by Arthur Chichester	Earl of Donegall; 1675–1678	Succeeded by Arthur Chichester
Preceded by Arthur Chichester	Baron Chichester; 2nd creation 1675–1678	Succeeded by Arthur Chichester
Preceded by Arthur Chichester	Viscount Chichester; 1675–1678	Succeeded by Arthur Chichester
