= Arthur Chichester, 1st Earl of Donegall =

Anglo-Irish military officer, politician and peer

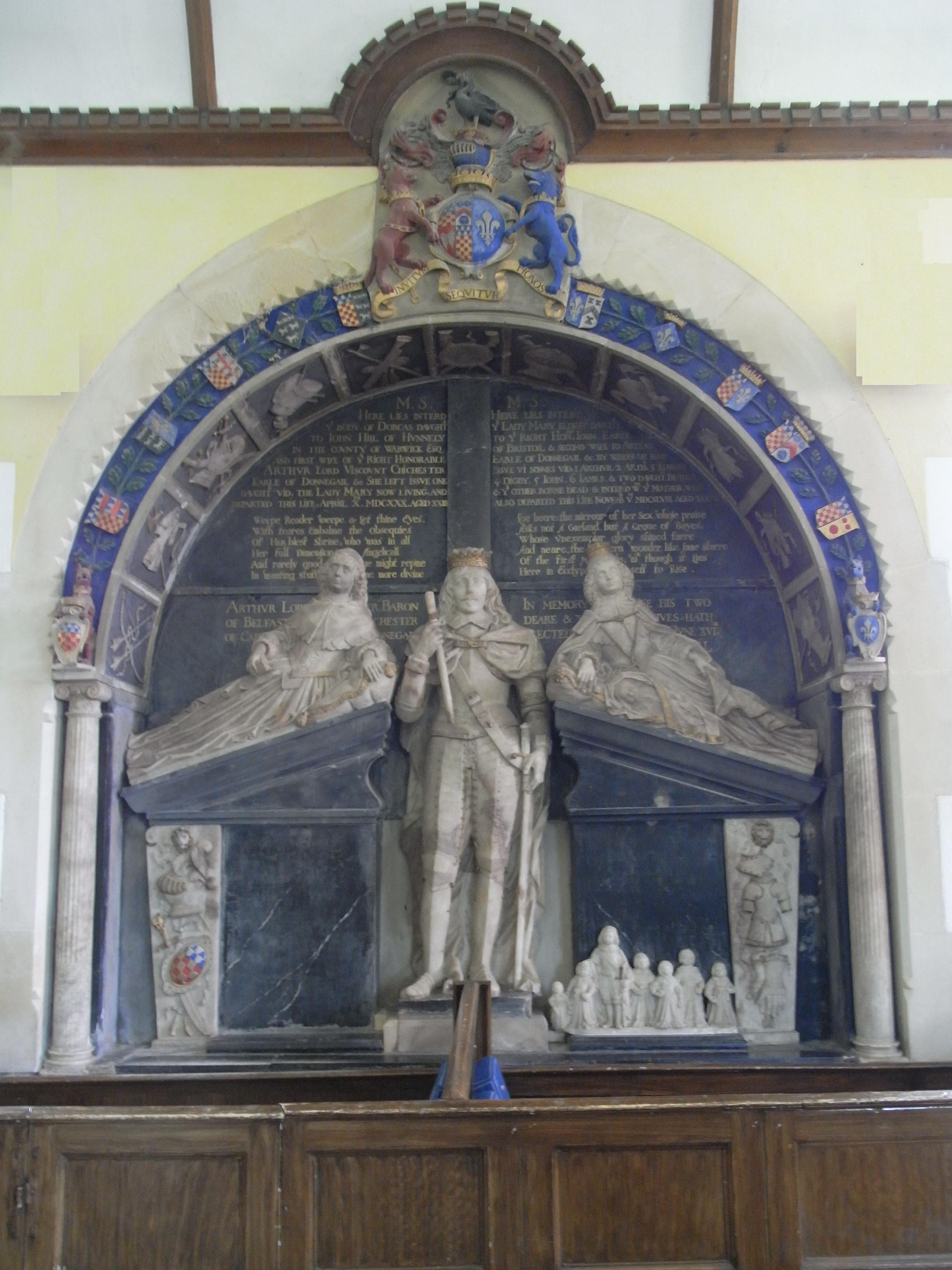
Monument to the two first wives of Arthur, 1st Earl of Donegall (1606–1674/5), Eggesford Church, Devon.

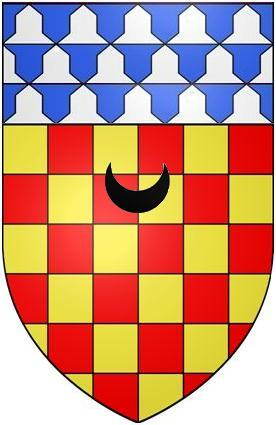
Arms of Chichester of Eggesford: Chequy or and gules, a chief vair a crescent sable for difference

Arthur Chichester, 1st Earl of Donegall (16 June 1606 – 18 March 1675), was an Anglo-Irish military officer, politician and peer.

== Origins ==
He was the eldest son and heir of the 1st Viscount Chichester, from Eggesford, Devon, by his first wife Anne Copleston, heiress of Eggesford.

== Career ==
He made a career as a soldier before being elected to the Irish House of Commons as Member of Parliament for Antrim in 1634 and again in 1640. Having distinguished himself in helping to put down the rebellion which took place in Ulster in 1641, Chichester was admitted to the Privy Council of Ireland in 1643. It was on the advice of James Butler, 1st Duke of Ormonde, Lord Lieutenant of Ireland, that in 1647 he was created Earl of Donegall in the Peerage of Ireland. The earldom was created with a special remainder to the male heirs of his father, whom he succeeded a year later as Viscount Chichester and Governor of Carrickfergus for life. He took his seat in the Irish House of Lords in 1661. In 1668 he endowed a mathematical lectureship at Trinity College Dublin with an annuity of 30 livre (pounds), which lectureship survives as an annual public lecture at the School of Mathematics in Trinity College.

== Marriages and children ==
He married three times:

- Firstly to Dorcas Hill (1607–1630), a daughter of John Hill of Honiley, Warwickshire (whose arms are shown on her monument in Eggesford Church: Sable, six talbot hounds argent, 3,2,1), by whom he had one daughter:
  - Mary Chichester, wife of John St Leger and mother of Arthur St Leger, 1st Viscount Doneraile (died 1727).
- Secondly to Lady Mary Digby (died 1648), daughter of John Digby, 1st Earl of Bristol (whose arms are shown on her monument in Eggesford Church: Azure, a fleur de lys argent), by whom he had eight children all of whom died young.
- Thirdly in 1651 he married Letitia Hicks, daughter of Sir William Hicks, 1st Baronet, by whom he had surviving children one son and one daughter, four other daughters having died young:
  - William Chichester (died 1660)
  - Anne Chichester (died 1697) who married firstly John Butler, 1st Earl of Gowran, and secondly Francis Aungier, 1st Earl of Longford.

== Death and burial ==
Lord Donegall died after a short illness in Belfast in 1675 and was buried in St Nicholas's Church, Carrickfergus.

== Succession ==
As all his sons had died young, the earldom passed under the remainder to his nephew Arthur Chichester.

Peerage of Ireland
New creation	Earl of Donegall; 1647–1675	Succeeded by Arthur Chichester
Preceded by Edward Chichester	Baron Chichester; 2nd creation 1648–1675	Succeeded by Arthur Chichester
Preceded by Edward Chichester	Viscount Chichester; 1648–1675	Succeeded by Arthur Chichester
