= Arthur Chichester, 1st Baron Templemore =

British soldier, politician and courtier

The Right Honourable Arthur Chichester

Member of Parliament for County Wexford

1st Baron Templemore
- In office 19 August 1830 – 27 September 1831 Serving with Viscount Valentia until 18 May 1831; Henry Lambert since 18 May 1831
- Preceded by: Robert Carew and Viscount Stopford
- Succeeded by: Robert Carew and Henry Lambert

Member of Parliament for Milborne Port
- In office 1826–1830 Serving with Thomas Graves until 1827; John Henry North since 1827
- Preceded by: Thomas Graves and Hon. Berkeley Paget
- Succeeded by: George Byng and William Sturges Bourne

Member of the House of Lords
- Lord Temporal
- In office 10 September 1831 – 26 September 1837
- Preceded by: Peerage created
- Succeeded by: The 2nd Baron Templemore

Personal details
- Born: 8 January 1797 Westminster, London
- Died: 26 September 1837 (aged 40) Coombe Bank, Kent
- Spouse: Lady Augusta Paget (m. 1820; died 1837)
- Children: 7
- Parent(s): Lord Spencer Chichester; Lady Anne Harriet Stewart
- Education: Brasenose College, Oxford

Arthur Chichester, 1st Baron Templemore (8 January 1797 – 26 September 1837), was a British soldier, politician and courtier.

== Early life ==
Chichester was born in Westminster, London, the eldest, and only surviving, son of Lord Spencer Chichester of Dunbrody Park (himself the third son of the 1st Marquess of Donegall) and Lady Anne Harriet Stewart (a daughter of the 7th Earl of Galloway).

He was educated in England at Harrow School from 1808 to 1813 before matriculating at Brasenose College, Oxford, in 1815.

== Career ==
He entered the British Army, serving with the 2nd Life Guards and eventually attaining the rank of lieutenant colonel in 1827.

In 1826 Chichester was elected Whig Member of Parliament for Milborne Port, a seat he held for four years before becoming representative for County Wexford in 1830.

The following year, on the occasion of the coronation of William IV, he was raised to the peerage as Baron Templemore, of Templemore in the County of Donegal ("Templemore" refers to the civil parish in the city of Derry, Northern Ireland). He was also made a Gentleman of the Bedchamber in 1835, and in 1837 succeeded this appointment as a Lord in Waiting.

== Personal life ==
On 27 July 1820, Chichester married Lady Augusta Paget, daughter of Henry Paget, 1st Marquess of Anglesey, and Lady Caroline Elizabeth Villiers. Together, they had five sons and two daughters, including:

- Hon. Harry Spencer Chichester (1821–1906), who married his first cousin once removed Laura Caroline Jane Paget, daughter of Rt. Hon. Sir Arthur Paget and Lady Augusta Fane (a daughter of 10th Earl of Westmorland), in 1842. After her death, he married Lady Victoria Elizabeth Ashley-Cooper, daughter of Anthony Ashley-Cooper, 7th Earl of Shaftesbury, and Lady Emily Cowper (a daughter of 5th Earl Cowper), in 1873. Succeeded as 2nd Baron Templemore.
- Hon. Augustus George Charles Chichester (1822–1896), a Lt.-Gen. in the 77th Foot who married Jane Townend, daughter of William Townend, in 1868.
- Hon. Frederick Arthur Henry Chichester (1824–1863), Gentleman Usher of the Scarlet Rod; he married Frances Tighe, daughter of Daniel Bunbury-Tighe and Hon. Frances Crofton (a daughter of Sir Edward Crofton, 3rd Baronet), in 1852.
- Hon. Adolphus William Chichester (1825–1855), who died unmarried.
- Hon. Francis Algernon James Chichester (1829–1885), a Capt. in the 7th Hussars who married Elizabeth Ann Dixon, daughter of George Dixon, in 1855. After her death, he married Lady Emily Stewart, daughter of the Randolph Stewart, 9th Earl of Galloway, and Lady Harriett Somerset (a daughter of 6th Duke of Beaufort), in 1875.
- Hon. Augusta Chichester (1831–1873), who married Robert King, 7th Earl of Kingston, son of Robert King, 6th Earl of Kingston, in 1854. After his death, she married Alfred Henry Caulfeild, son of Francis St. George Caulfeild, in 1872.
- Hon. Caroline Georgiana Chichester (d. 1892), who married Sir Charles Lennox Peel, son of Laurence Peel and Lady Jane Lennox (a daughter of the 4th Duke of Richmond), in 1848.

Lord Templemore died after a short illness on 26 September 1837, aged 40, at his home of Coombe Bank, Kent, and was buried at nearby Sundridge. His wife outlived him by thirty-five years, dying in 1872.

Parliament of the United Kingdom
Preceded by Thomas Graves; Hon. Berkeley Paget	Member of Parliament for Milborne Port; 1826–1830; With: Thomas Graves 1826–1827; John Henry North 1827–1830	Succeeded by George Byng; William Sturges Bourne
Preceded by Robert Carew; Viscount Stopford	Member of Parliament for County Wexford; 1830–1831; With: Viscount Valentia 1830–1831; Henry Lambert 1831–1831	Succeeded by Robert Carew; Henry Lambert
Peerage of the United Kingdom
New creation	Baron Templemore; 1831–1837; Member of the House of Lords (1831–1837)	Succeeded by Harry Chichester
