= Baird baronets of Urie (1897) =

Escutcheon of the Baird baronets of Urie

The Baird Baronetcy of Urie was created in the Baronetage of the United Kingdom on 8 March 1897 for Alexander Baird of Urie of the junior cadet branch of the Bairds of Gartsherrie. This Baird baronetcy has later been held with the titles Baron Stonehaven, Viscount Stonehaven and Earl of Kintore.

== Baird baronets, of Urie (1897) ==
- Sir Alexander Baird, 1st Baronet (1849–1920)

His son John Baird (1874–1941) succeeded his father in 1920, becoming the 2nd Baronet. He was made Governor-General of Australia in 1925, and was also created Baron Stonehaven. He died in 1941 as the 1st Viscount Stonehaven. The title from 1941 was held by his eldest son Ian James Baird (1908–1989), at that point known as Viscount Stonehaven; after a change of surname in 1967 he was known as Ian Keith, 12th Earl of Kintore. See Earl of Kintore for the further holders.

== Notes ==
Baronetage of the United Kingdom
Preceded by Musgrave baronets	Baird baronets of Urie; 8 March 1897	Succeeded by Wills baronets
