= 1885 County Antrim by-election =

UK parliamentary by-election

A by-election was held in the constituency of County Antrim, Ireland, on Thursday 21 May 1885.

== Vacancy ==
The by-election was held to fill the vacancy caused by the death of the sitting Conservative MP James Chaine on 4 May 1885, at the age of only 43. Chaine had been one of the MPs for the constituency since 1874.

== Candidates ==
The Conservatives selected Robert Torrens O'Neill as their candidate. O'Neill, who was 40 years old at the time of the by-election, was the third son of Lord O'Neill and thus a member of the prominent Irish Chichester family headed by the Marquess of Donegall.

The Liberals chose William Pirrie Sinclair, a 38-year-old, Belfast born merchant and ship owner with business interests in Glasgow, Liverpool and elsewhere.

== The campaign ==
O'Neill announced his candidature with the issue of an address to the electors of Antrim, calling himself a Constitutional candidate. He said he would try to advance the interests of the tenant farmers and would support measures to enable them to buy their farms on easy terms. He also pledged strenuously to oppose the admission of atheists to Parliament.

Sinclair had two main campaigning themes. He favoured some reform of Irish government but opposed Home Rule. He also took a stand against the policies of his own government in opposing the case for coercion laws, for example those which allowed imprisonment without trial or rent boycotts and those giving government officers the power to change trial venues or appoint special juries.

== Result ==
Sinclair gained the seat from the Conservatives with a majority of 139 votes. This seemed to come as something of a surprise to both sides as the Conservatives had been reported as confident and the Liberals rather despondent. The defeat was taken as a bad omen for the Conservatives in view of the forthcoming general election. One commentator put forward the possible explanation that the Conservatives had not taken the election as seriously as they should, given that the general election would soon be upon them. There was a reduced turnout over the previous 1880 general election and it was felt that the voters too were underwhelmed by the prospect of going to the polls twice in quick succession. The Liberals believed that their candidate's stand on coercion was an important factor. Thomas Alexander Dickson Liberal MP for County Tyrone said he had spoken at one of Sinclair's campaign meetings and had been enthusiastically received on this issue. The Times was sceptical on this as an explanation, which, it reported, could have been down to numerous factors; but it did point to the Coercion question as one which could prove fruitful for the Irish Parliamentary Party at the forthcoming general election and problematic for the Liberals. This certainly seemed to prove true. The Liberals failed to win any seat at the 1885 general election in what became Northern Ireland in 1921, while the Conservatives won sixteen and the Nationalists eight. One psephologist has noted that the fact that the Liberal Party was not in a majority in the House of Commons was caused by the activities of the Irish Nationalists. Charles Stewart Parnell had advised his supporters to vote Conservative if there were no Irish Nationalist candidates running and that it is almost certain the Nationalists caused the loss of at least five, or perhaps seven or more Liberal seats.

County Antrim by-election, 21 May 1885
| Party | Candidate | Votes | % | ±% |
|---|---|---|---|---|
| Liberal | William Pirrie Sinclair | 3,971 | 50.9 | +2.6 |
| Conservative | Robert Torrens O'Neill | 3,832 | 49.1 | −2.6 |
| Majority | | 139 | 1.8 | N/A |
| Turnout | | 7,803 | 66.7 | −16.5 |
| Liberal gain from Conservative | | Swing | +2.6 | |

== Later developments ==
The County Antrim constituency itself was abolished for the 1885 election and divided into four single-member divisions. Sinclair stood in North Antrim in a three-cornered contest but was not successful. The defeated O'Neill was luckier. He tried his hand in the new seat of Mid Antrim where he beat Sinclair's by-election helper Thomas Dickson.

Sinclair did however return to the House of Commons at the 1886 general election as Liberal Unionist Party member for Falkirk Burghs in the central Scottish Lowlands.

== See also ==
- List of United Kingdom by-elections (1868–1885)
