= William Baird (MP) =

Scottish politician (1796-1864)

William Baird of Elie
- Born: 23 April 1796; Old Monkland, Lanarkshire
- Died: 8 March 1864 (aged 79); Edinburgh
- Occupation: Scottish industrialist
- Relatives: James Baird, (brother); John George Alexander Baird MP (son). nephews: George Alexander Baird, Sir Alexander Baird, 1st Baronet

William Baird of Elie DL (23 April 1796 – 8 March 1864), was a Scottish industrialist and the Tory Member of Parliament (MP) for Falkirk Burghs.

He was born near Old Monkland as the eldest son of Alexander Baird and Jean Moffat. After a farming beginning, his father took out a lease on coal reserves on the Rochsolloch Estate between Coatbridge and Airdrie. He put two of his sons in charge of the business and the company of William Baird & Co was formed. The family would later set up the large ironworks known as Bairds of Gartsherrie, which William's younger brother James would lead after William's retirement from the business.

He was first elected at the 1841 general election, and held the seat until he resigned from Parliament on 2 May 1846, by the procedural device of becoming Steward of the Chiltern Hundreds.

The resulting by-election in Falkirk was won by the Tory candidate, Henry Pelham-Clinton, known by his courtesy title "Earl of Lincoln". When Lincoln acceded to his Dukedom in 1851, Baird's brother James was elected in his place.

In 1853, he acquired the Elie estate in Fife, which was inherited by his eldest son William (1848-1918). His younger son John George Alexander Baird was also an MP.

He died in Edinburgh in 1864.

Parliament of the United Kingdom
Preceded by William Gillon	Member of Parliament for Falkirk Burghs; 1841 – 1846	Succeeded by Earl of Lincoln
