= Michael Keith, 13th Earl of Kintore =

British noble

The Right Honourable The Earl of Kintore

Personal details
- Born: Michael Canning William John Keith; 22 February 1939
- Died: 30 October 2004 (aged 65)
- Spouse: Mary Plum (m. 1972)
- Relations: John Baird, 1st Viscount Stonehaven (grandfather)
- Children: 2
- Parent: Ian Keith, 12th Earl of Kintore
- Education: Eton College
- Alma mater: Royal Military Academy, Sandhurst
- Known for: Chief of Clan Keith

Military service
- Branch/service: Coldstream Guards
- Rank: Lieutenant

Michael Canning William John Keith of Urie, 13th Earl of Kintore (22 February 1939 – 30 October 2004), styled Master of Inverurie between 1974 and 1989, was a Scottish peer and nobleman.

He was also the 13th Lord Keith of Inverurie and Keith Hall, the 3rd Viscount Stonehaven and 3rd Baron Stonehaven in the peerage of the United Kingdom, giving him a seat in the House of Lords until 1999, the 4th Baronet, and 5th of Ury.

== Early life ==
Keith was born on 22 February 1939, the eldest son of Ian Keith, 12th Earl of Kintore, and the former Delia Virginia Loyd. His elder sister, Lady Diana, married John Francis Holman of Rickarton.

His paternal grandparents were John Baird, 1st Viscount Stonehaven, Governor-General of Australia and Minister for Transport, and Ethel Sydney Keith-Falconer, 11th Countess of Kintore in her own right. His mother was the only daughter of William Lewis Brownlow Loyd of Upper House and the former Hon. Bettine Henrietta Knatchbull-Hugessen (second daughter of Edward Knatchbull-Hugessen, 2nd Baron Brabourne).

== Career ==
Keith was educated at Eton College and at Royal Military Academy, Sandhurst. He gained the rank of Lieutenant in the Coldstream Guards. He held the position of Chief of Clan Keith from 1989 until his death.

In 1993 he was awarded the honorary degree of Doctor of Law (LL.D.) by Aberdeen University.

On 4 August 2002, Lord Kintore, as chief of Clan Keith, ended a "centuries-old feud with neighbouring" Clan Irvine. The feud began in 1402 when Irvines slaughtered an invading war party of Keiths at the Battle of Drumoak. Lord Kintore shook hands and signed a peace treaty with David Irvine of Drum, clan chief.

== Personal life ==
On 9 October 1972, Keith married Mary Plum (1943–2006), the only daughter of Squadron Leader Elisha Gaddis Plum, of Rumson, New Jersey (a descendant of Elisha Gaddis), who died during World War II. Together, they were the parents of two children:

- James William Falconer Keith of Urie, 14th Earl of Kintore, 14th Lord Keith of Inverurie and Keith Hall, 4th Viscount Stonehaven, 4th Baron Stonehaven, 5th Baronet, 6th of Ury (b. 15 April 1976), who married and had one son, Tristan Michael Keith, Lord Keith of Inverurie and Keith Hall (b. 2010), heir apparent to the earldom of Kintore.
- Lady Iona Delia Mary Gaddis Keith (b. 1 January 1978), who married Mark Hopkins, younger son of Mrs. Violet Hopkins, of Welwyn Garden City, Hertfordshire, in 2008.

Lord Kintore died on 30 October 2004 and he was succeeded in his titles by his only son, James. Lady Kintore died on 1 August 2006.

Peerage of Scotland
Preceded by James Ian Keith	Earl of Kintore; 1989–2004	Succeeded by James William Falconer Keith
Peerage of the United Kingdom
Preceded by James Ian Keith	Viscount Stonehaven; 1989–2004	Succeeded by James William Falconer Keith
