= Tom Porteous (cricketer) =

Scottish cricketer

Personal information
- Full name: Thomas Wilkie Porteous
- Born: 22 January 1948 (age 78); Dennistoun, Lanarkshire, Scotland
- Batting: Right-handed

Domestic team information
- Years: Team
- 1973–1974: Scotland

Career statistics
| Competition | First-class |
|---|---|
| Matches | 2 |
| Runs scored | 18 |
| Batting average | 4.50 |
| 100s/50s | –/– |
| Top score | 18 |
| Catches/stumpings | 5/– |
- Source: Cricinfo, 16 July 2022

Thomas Wilkie Porteous (born 22 January 1948) was a Scottish first-class cricketer.

Porteous was born at Dennistoun in January 1948. He was educated at Coatbridge High School. A club cricketer for Drumpellier Cricket Club, Porteous made two appearances in first-class cricket for Scotland, both against Ireland at Cork in 1973 and Ayr in 1974. Batting four times across his two matches, Porteous was dismissed without scoring in three of them, scoring all 18 of his first-class runs in a single innings. Outside of cricket, Porteous was employed in human resources at a bank.
