= 1948 Stirling and Falkirk by-election =

UK by-election

A 1948 by-election for the constituency of Stirling and Falkirk in the UK House of Commons was held on 7 October 1948, caused by the death of the incumbent Labour MP Joseph Westwood. The result was a hold for the Labour Party, with their candidate Malcolm MacPherson.

== Result ==
Stirling and Falkirk by-election, 1948
Party	Candidate	Votes	%	±%
Labour	Malcolm MacPherson	17,001	49.0	−7.1
Unionist	W Forbes	14,826	42.8	−1.1
SNP	Robert Curran	2,831	8.2	New
Majority		2,175	6.2	−6.0
Turnout		34,658	72.9	+1.4
Labour hold		Swing	-3.0	

== Previous election ==
General election 1945: Stirling and Falkirk
Party	Candidate	Votes	%	±%
Labour	Joseph Westwood	18,326	56.1	+4.9
Unionist	JFG Thomson	14,323	43.9	−4.9
Majority		4,003	12.2	+9.8
Turnout		32,649	71.5	−6.9
Labour hold		Swing	+4.9	
