= Bonfire Night (disambiguation) =

Bonfire Night is a traditional celebration involving bonfires in several countries.

Specifically, Bonfire Night may refer to:

- Guy Fawkes Night, in Great Britain and some Commonwealth nations (5 November)
- Halloween or Hallowe'en (a contraction of "All Hallows' evening"), a celebration observed in many countries, on 31 October, the eve of the Western Christian feast of All Hallows' Day, corresponding to the Celtic festival of Samhain
- Saint John's Eve (23 June) or St John's Night (24 June), in many countries
- Eleventh Night, in Northern Ireland (11 July)
- Aggie Bonfire, also called "Student Bonfire", Texas A&M University, United States (November)
- Chaharshanbe Suri, ancient Zoroastrian fire-jumping festival as a prelude to the start of the spring season, celebrated by Persian, Azerbaijani, and Kurdish people (March)
