= James Baird (industrialist) =

Scottish industrialist (1802-1876)

- Born: 5 December 1802; Old Monkland, Lanarkshire
- Died: 20 June 1876 (aged 73); Cambusdoon House, Alloway
- Known for: Scottish industrialist and founder of the Baird Trust
- Relatives: William Baird, (brother) nephews:John George Alexander Baird MP, George Alexander Baird, Sir Alexander Baird, 1st Baronet

James Baird (5 December 1802 in Old Monkland, Lanarkshire – 20 June 1876 in Cambusdoon House, Alloway) was a Scottish industrialist. He was the founder of the Baird Trust.

== Life ==
He was born near Old Monkland, the fourth of the eight sons (and two daughters) of Alexander Baird and Jean Moffat. After a farming beginning, his father took out a lease on coal reserves on the Rochsolloch Estate between Coatbridge and Airdrie. He put two of his sons in charge of the business, and at this stage, the company of William Baird & Co was formed, in the name of his older brother William. The family would later set up the ironworks known as Bairds of Gartsherrie which was the largest in the country. James focussed upon the iron processing industry.

Despite claims that it might damage the furnaces, from 1837 all furnaces were turned off on Sundays. This meant not only that it was a day of rest, but the whole atmosphere literally changed in the towns and villages. By 1864, he had grown his blast furnaces to nearly fifty, producing 300,000 tons of iron annually, and employing 10,000 people.

Throughout his life, he acquired land in Lanarkshire, Ayrshire and Fife, all for mining purposes. As the first Scot to introduce the chain-driven coal-cutters his companies had major advantages over his rivals who still dug by hand. Much of his money was returned to the community in terms of school-building and church-building.

From 1851 to 1857, he was an elected Tory Member of Parliament (MP) for the Falkirk Burghs. His older brother William had had this seat just four years before.

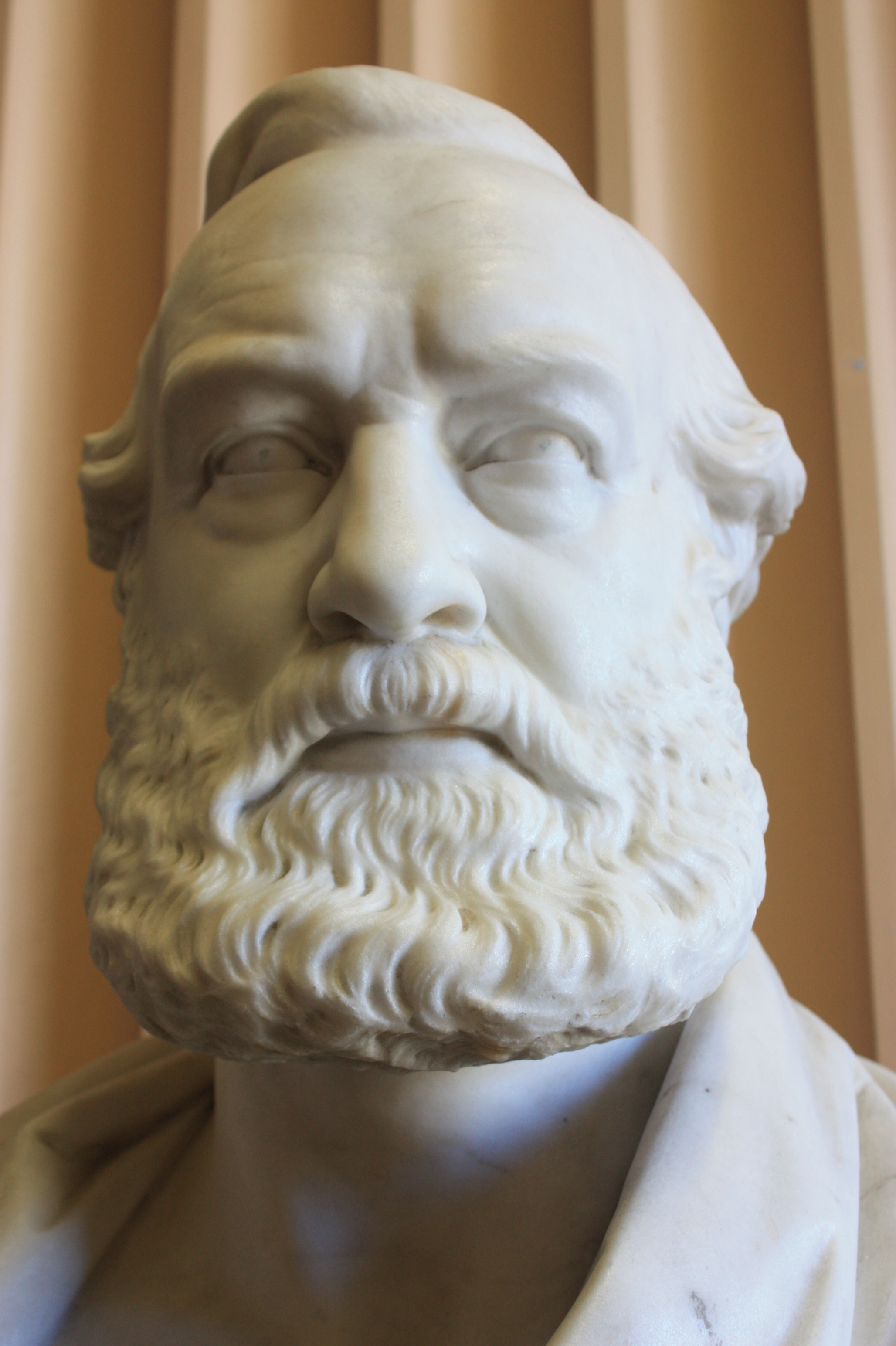
Bust of James Baird, probably by John Mossman, dated Glasgow 1876, standing in Old College, University of Edinburgh

The Baird brothers grew very wealthy from their ironworks and bought several landed estates in Scotland : in 1852, James Baird purchased the Ayrshire estate of Cambusdoon (formerly known as Greenfield) and in 1857 he acquired Knoydart. He also bought Auchendrane (Ayrshire) in 1862, Muirkirk in 1863, and Drumellan in 1864. When his childless younger brother Robert (1806-1856) predeceased him, he also inherited the Auchmedden estate, which had belonged to another line of Bairds in previous centuries, though the connection between the two families is unsure.

Baird was, while anti-union, very interested to give his workers education. He also donated £500,000 to support churches.

He died childless and unmarried at his country retreat Cambusdoon. One of his nephews was John George Alexander Baird MP, who succeeded him in his Muirkirk estate, and another was the prominent race horse owner and jockey George Alexander Baird, who inherited the Auchmeddan estate from him. From yet another nephew, Sir Alexander Baird, 1st Baronet, descend the Viscounts Stonehaven.

== Baird Trust ==
Baird founded the Baird Trust, a charitable organization aimed at helping to fund church projects and spreading the word of the gospel. It funds both church extension projects, mission work and gives help to misters and their families. The original sum, a staggering £500,000 was overseen from 1873 by a board of trustees from the Church of Scotland including Rev Archibald Scott.

The Baird Lectures, begun in 1873, were part of the overall concept, promoting Scottish orthodoxy.

Baird Trust Order Confirmation Act 1939
- Act of Parliament
- Parliament of the United Kingdom
- Long title: An Act to confirm a Provisional Order under the Private Legislation Procedure (Scotland) Act, 1936, relating to the Baird Trust.
- Citation: 2 & 3 Geo. 6. c. cv

Dates
- Royal assent: 31 October 1939
Other legislation
Repealed by	Baird Trust Reorganisation Act 2005
Relates to	Private Legislation Procedure (Scotland) Act 1936

Status: Repealed

Baird Trust Order Confirmation Act 1957
- Act of Parliament
- Parliament of the United Kingdom
- Long title: An Act to confirm a Provisional Order under the Private Legislation Procedure (Scotland) Act 1936 relating to the Baird Trust.
- Citation: 5 & 6 Eliz. 2. c. xiii

Dates
- Royal assent: 17 July 1957
Other legislation
Repealed by	Baird Trust Reorganisation Act 2005
Relates to	Private Legislation Procedure (Scotland) Act 1936

Status: Repealed

Text of statute as originally enacted

Baird Trust Order Confirmation Act 1971
- Act of Parliament
- Parliament of the United Kingdom
- Long title: An Act to confirm a Provisional Order under the Private Legislation Procedure (Scotland) Act 1936, relating to the Baird Trust.
- Citation: 1971 c. lxxii

Dates
- Royal assent: 16 December 1971
Other legislation
Repealed by	Baird Trust Reorganisation Act 2005
Relates to	Private Legislation Procedure (Scotland) Act 1936

Status: Repealed

Text of statute as originally enacted

Baird Trust Reorganisation Act 2005
- Act of Parliament
- Scottish Parliament
- Long title: An Act of the Scottish Parliament to transfer the property, rights, interests and liabilities of The Baird Trust to a successor company limited by guarantee and to dissolve The Baird Trust; and for connected purposes.
- Citation: 2005 asp 11

Dates
- Royal assent: 19 July 2005
Other legislation
Repeals/revokes	Baird Trust Order Confirmation Act 1939; Baird Trust Order Confirmation Act 1957; Baird Trust Order Confirmation Act 1971

Status: Current legislation

Text of statute as originally enacted

Text of the Baird Trust Reorganisation Act 2005 as in force today (including any amendments) within the United Kingdom, from legislation.gov.uk.

The trust was restructured as a corporate body in 1939 by the Baird Trust Order Confirmation Act 1939 (2 & 3 Geo. 6. c. cv).

The trust was valued at £15 million in 2025. It annually pays out sums of £250,000 or more.

Parliament of the United Kingdom
Preceded by Henry Pelham-Clinton	Member of Parliament for Falkirk Burghs; 1851–1857	Succeeded by James Merry
