= Falkirk East =

Falkirk East may mean or refer to:

- Falkirk East (UK Parliament constituency)
- Falkirk East (Scottish Parliament constituency)
