= Harry Smith (MP) =

British politician

Harry Smith (12 Aug 1829 – 29 Sep 1910), was a British politician. He was the Liberal Member of Parliament for Falkirk Burghs July 1892 to 23 July 1895.
He married Julia Medina Jones on 6 August 1861 at Casterton, Westmorland, England.
Between 1874 and 1885 he was Sheriff-substitute for Renfrewshire at Greenock.
He died dsp aged 81 on 29 September 1910 in Poyle Lodge, Guildford, Surrey and was buried on 3 October 1910 at Guildford.

Parliament of the United Kingdom
Preceded by William Pirrie Sinclair	Member of Parliament for Falkirk Burghs; 1892–1895	Succeeded by John Wilson
