= Malcolm MacPherson =

Scottish Labour politician (1904–1971)

Malcolm MacPherson (18 August 1904 – 24 May 1971) was a Scottish Labour politician.

== Biography ==
Malcolm MacPherson was born on the Isle of May, in the Firth of Forth, where his father, John McPherson, was one of the lighthouse keepers. Malcolm was educated at Trinity Academy, Edinburgh and then the University of Edinburgh. From 1928 until 1938 he was a lecturer at the University of New Brunswick, before moving to a similar position at University College Exeter. During World War II, he served in the Canadian Army, eventually rising to the rank of major. He was awarded the MBE for his work with the Canadian Army in planning the D-Day landings of June 1944. Prior to his election to parliament he had been teaching at various schools in Midlothian.

He was beaten by only 174 votes at Yeovil in 1945, before being elected Member of Parliament for Stirling and Falkirk at a 1948 by-election, which he served until his death in 1971.

Parliament of the United Kingdom
| Preceded by Joseph Westwood | Member of Parliament for Stirling and Falkirk; 1948 –1971 | Succeeded by Harry Ewing |
