= John Ramsay (of Kildalton) =

Scottish distiller, merchant and politician (1814–1892)

John Ramsay (15 August 1814 – 24 June 1892) was a Scottish distiller, merchant and Liberal Party politician.

== Biography ==
Ramsay was born on 15 August 1814, to Robert Ramsay of Stirling and his wife Elizabeth Stirling. He was educated at Glasgow University and became a merchant in Glasgow. He was granted a lease in 1836 on the struggling Port Ellen whisky distillery on the island of Islay in the Inner Hebrides. He enlarged and improved the pier at Port Ellen in 1881 and became one of the pioneers of the export trade in Scotch whisky to the United States. He also inaugurated the first bi-weekly cargo and passenger service by steamship between Islay and Glasgow. He helped to improve the island's infrastructure and built Kildalton Castle, a rambling Scottish baronial country house in Port Ellen.

He was a Deputy Lieutenant and a J.P. for Argyllshire and a J.P. for Lanarkshire and showed a major interest in education. In 1864, he was a member of the Royal Commission on Education in Scotland, being also an unpaid member of Board of Education for Scotland. He was a Fellow or member of several learned societies.

In April 1868, Ramsay was elected at a by-election as the Member of Parliament (MP) for Stirling Burghs when his predecessor gave up the seat under the influence of a spiritualist prophet. He only sat until the general election in November that year, when he lost the seat to the future prime minister Henry Campbell-Bannerman. Ramsay was a member of the Royal Commission on Endowed Schools in Scotland in 1872. In the 1874 general election, he was elected as the MP for Falkirk Burghs, but discovering he had been in breach of regulations as he held a government contract at the time, stood down in March and was re-elected at a by-election that month. He held the seat until 1886, and in the meantime was a member of Endowed Institutions Commission under the Endowed Institutions (Scotland) Act 1878, and of Educational Endowments Commission under the Educational Endowments (Scotland) Act 1882.

Ramsay lived at Kildalton, Argyllshire. He on 25 June 1893, aged 78.

Ramsay married firstly Eliza, Shields of Lanchester, Durham in 1857. She died in 1864, and he married again in 1871 to Lucy Martin of Auchendennan, Dumbarton.

Parliament of the United Kingdom
| Preceded by Laurence Oliphant | Member of Parliament for Stirling Burghs; 1868–1868 | Succeeded by Henry Campbell-Bannerman |
| Preceded by James Merry | Member of Parliament for Falkirk Burghs; 1874–1886 | Succeeded by William Pirrie Sinclair |
