= Stirling and Falkirk (UK Parliament constituency) =

Parliamentary constituency in the United Kingdom, 1918–1983

Stirling and Falkirk Burghs
- Former burgh constituency for the House of Commons
- Major settlements: Stirling, Falkirk and Grangemouth

1950–1983
- Seats: One
- Replaced by: Stirling, Falkirk East and Falkirk West

1918–1950
- Seats: One
- Type of constituency: District of Burghs constituency
- Created from: Stirlingshire; Stirling Burghs; Falkirk Burghs

Stirling and Falkirk Burghs was a parliamentary constituency represented in the House of Commons of the Parliament of the United Kingdom from 1918, comprising the burghs of Stirling, Falkirk and Grangemouth. It ceased to be a District of Burghs in 1950, but a constituency of the same name covering the same burghs continued in existence. In 1974 it became Stirling, Falkirk and Grangemouth. This was in turn abolished in 1983; it was the last British constituency (apart from those including islands) to consist of non-contiguous parts.

== Boundaries ==
The Representation of the People Act 1918 provided that the constituency was to consist of the burghs of Stirling, Falkirk and Grangemouth.

== Members of Parliament ==
=== Stirling and Falkirk (1918-1974) ===
Year	Member	Party	Notes
1918	John Macdonald	Coalition Liberal	
1922	John Macdonald	National Liberal	
1922	Hugh Murnin	Labour	
1923	George McCrae	Liberal	
1924	Hugh Murnin	Labour	
1931	James Reid	Conservative	later Baron Reid
1935	Joseph Westwood	Labour	
1948 by-election	Malcolm MacPherson	Labour	
1971 by-election	Harry Ewing	Labour	
Feb 1974	constituency abolished		

=== Stirling, Falkirk and Grangemouth (1974-1983) ===
Year	Member	Party
Feb 1974	Harry Ewing	Labour

== Elections ==
=== Elections in the 1970s ===
General election 1979: Stirling, Falkirk and Grangemouth
Party	Candidate	Votes	%	±%
Labour	Harry Ewing	29,499	56.47	+13.22
Conservative	William Dunn Boyles	13,881	26.57	+12.50
SNP	John Archibald Donachy	8,856	16.95	−22.84
Majority		15,618	29.90	+26.44
Turnout		52,236	78.95	−0.41
Labour hold		Swing	+0.36	

General election October 1974: Stirling, Falkirk and Grangemouth
Party	Candidate	Votes	%	±%
Labour	Harry Ewing	22,090	43.25	+1.39
SNP	Robert McIntyre	20,324	39.79	+5.26
Conservative	Geoffrey Alexander Campbell	7,186	14.07	−9.54
Liberal	John David Angles	1,477	2.89	New
Majority		1,766	3.46	−3.87
Turnout		51,077	79.36	−1.87
Labour hold		Swing	-3.87	

General election February 1974: Stirling, Falkirk and Grangemouth
Party	Candidate	Votes	%	±%
Labour	Harry Ewing	21,685	41.86	−8.87
SNP	Robert McIntyre	17,886	34.53	+20.03
Conservative	Geoffrey Alexander Campbell	12,228	23.61	−11.16
Majority		3,799	7.33	−8.63
Turnout		51,799	81.23	+8.65
Labour hold		Swing	-14.45	

1971 Stirling and Falkirk by-election
Party	Candidate	Votes	%	±%
Labour	Harry Ewing	17,536	46.47	−4.26
SNP	Robert McIntyre	13,048	34.58	+20.08
Conservative	David R Anderson	7,149	18.95	−15.82
Majority		4,488	11.89	−4.07
Turnout		37,733		
Labour hold		Swing	-12.17	

General election 1970: Stirling and Falkirk
Party	Candidate	Votes	%	±%
Labour	Malcolm MacPherson	22,984	50.73	−1.92
Conservative	David R Anderson	15,754	34.77	+3.55
SNP	Iain Murray	6,571	14.50	+0.12
Majority		7,230	15.96	−5.47
Turnout		45,309	72.58	−4.52
Labour hold		Swing	-2.74	

=== Elections in the 1960s ===
General election 1966: Stirling and Falkirk
Party	Candidate	Votes	%	±%
Labour	Malcolm MacPherson	23,146	52.65	+0.26
Conservative	Iain Docherty	13,726	31.22	−6.39
SNP	Sandy Milne	6,322	14.38	+4.40
Communist	Peter McIntosh	767	1.74	New
Majority		9,420	21.43	+6.67
Turnout		43,961	77.10	−2.75
Labour hold		Swing	+3.33	

General election 1964: Stirling and Falkirk
Party	Candidate	Votes	%	±%
Labour	Malcolm MacPherson	23,766	52.39	+2.78
Unionist	John A Davidson	17,070	37.63	−6.17
SNP	Sandy Milne	4,526	9.98	+3.38
Majority		6,696	14.76	+8.95
Turnout		45,362	79.85	−1.22
Labour hold		Swing	+4.48	

=== Elections in the 1950s ===
General election 1959: Stirling and Falkirk
Party	Candidate	Votes	%	±%
Labour	Malcolm MacPherson	22,423	49.61	+1.45
Unionist	Robert S Johnston	19,797	43.80	−1.31
SNP	Jimmy Halliday	2,983	6.60	−0.13
Majority		2,626	5.81	+2.76
Turnout		45,203	81.07	+1.41
Labour hold		Swing	+1.38	

General election 1955: Stirling and Falkirk
Party	Candidate	Votes	%	±%
Labour	Malcolm MacPherson	20,651	48.16	−4.10
Unionist	James McMillan	19,345	45.11	−2.63
SNP	Jimmy Halliday	2,885	6.73	New
Majority		1,306	3.05	−9.01
Turnout		42,881	79.66	−6.41
Labour hold		Swing	-0.74	

General election 1951: Stirling and Falkirk
Party	Candidate	Votes	%	±%
Labour	Malcolm MacPherson	24,421	52.26	+3.30
Unionist	William D H C Forbes	22,313	47.74	+2.21
Majority		1,108	4.52	+1.09
Turnout		46,734	86.07	+1.66
Labour hold		Swing	+0.55	

General election 1950: Stirling and Falkirk
Party	Candidate	Votes	%	±%
Labour	Malcolm MacPherson	22,186	48.96	−7.17
Unionist	William D H C Forbes	20,632	45.53	+1.67
SNP	Robert Curran	1,698	3.75	N/A
Communist	G McAlister	801	1.77	New
Majority		1,554	3.43	−8.83
Turnout		45,317	84.41	+12.91
Labour hold		Swing	-4.42	

=== Elections in the 1940s ===
1948 Stirling and Falkirk by-election
Party	Candidate	Votes	%	±%
Labour	Malcolm MacPherson	17,001	49.0	−7.1
Unionist	William D H C Forbes	14,826	42.8	−1.1
SNP	Robert Curran	2,831	8.2	New
Majority		2,175	6.2	−6.0
Turnout		34,658	72.9	+1.4
Labour hold		Swing	-3.0	

General election 1945: Stirling and Falkirk
Party	Candidate	Votes	%	±%
Labour	Joseph Westwood	18,326	56.1	+4.9
Unionist	James Frederick Gordon Thomson	14,323	43.9	−4.9
Majority		4,003	12.2	+9.8
Turnout		32,649	71.5	−6.9
Labour hold		Swing	+4.9	

=== Elections in the 1930s ===
General election 1935: Stirling and Falkirk
Party	Candidate	Votes	%	±%
Labour	Joseph Westwood	17,958	51.2	+14.8
Unionist	James Reid	17,087	48.8	−14.8
Majority		871	2.4	N/A
Turnout		35,045	78.4	−3.0
Labour gain from Unionist		Swing	+14.8	

General election 1931: Stirling and Falkirk
Party	Candidate	Votes	%	±%
Unionist	James Reid	21,844	63.6	+32.3
Labour	Hugh Murnin	12,483	36.4	−11.0
Majority		9,361	27.2	N/A
Turnout		34,327	81.4	+2.3
Unionist gain from Labour		Swing	+21.6	

=== Elections in the 1920s ===
General election 1929: Stirling and Falkirk
Party	Candidate	Votes	%	±%
Labour	Hugh Murnin	15,408	47.4	−6.5
Unionist	Douglas Jamieson	10,164	31.3	New
SPL	Alexander Ratcliffe	6,902	21.3	New
Majority		5,244	16.1	+8.3
Turnout		32,474	79.1	−2.5
Labour hold		Swing	N/A	

General election 1924: Stirling and Falkirk
Party	Candidate	Votes	%	±%
Labour	Hugh Murnin	13,436	53.9	+4.3
Liberal	George McCrae	11,512	46.1	−4.3
Majority		1,924	7.8	N/A
Turnout		24,948	81.6	+9.9
Labour gain from Liberal		Swing	+4.3	

General election 1923: Stirling and Falkirk
Party	Candidate	Votes	%	±%
Liberal	George McCrae	10,721	50.4	+3.7
Labour	Hugh Murnin	10,565	49.6	−3.7
Majority		156	0.8	N/A
Turnout		21,286	71.7	0.0
Liberal gain from Labour		Swing	+3.7	

General election 1922: Stirling and Falkirk
Party	Candidate	Votes	%	±%
Labour	Hugh Murnin	11,073	53.3	+17.6
National Liberal	John Macdonald	9,717	46.7	−17.6
Majority		1,356	6.6	N/A
Turnout		20,790	71.7	+22.3
Labour gain from National Liberal		Swing	+17.6	

=== Elections in the 1910s ===
General election 1918: Stirling and Falkirk
Party	Candidate	Votes	%
National Liberal	John Macdonald	9,350	64.3
Labour	Archibald Logan	5,201	35.7
Majority		4,149	28.6
Turnout		14,551	49.4
National Liberal win (new seat)			
