= Michael Connarty =

British politician (born 1947)

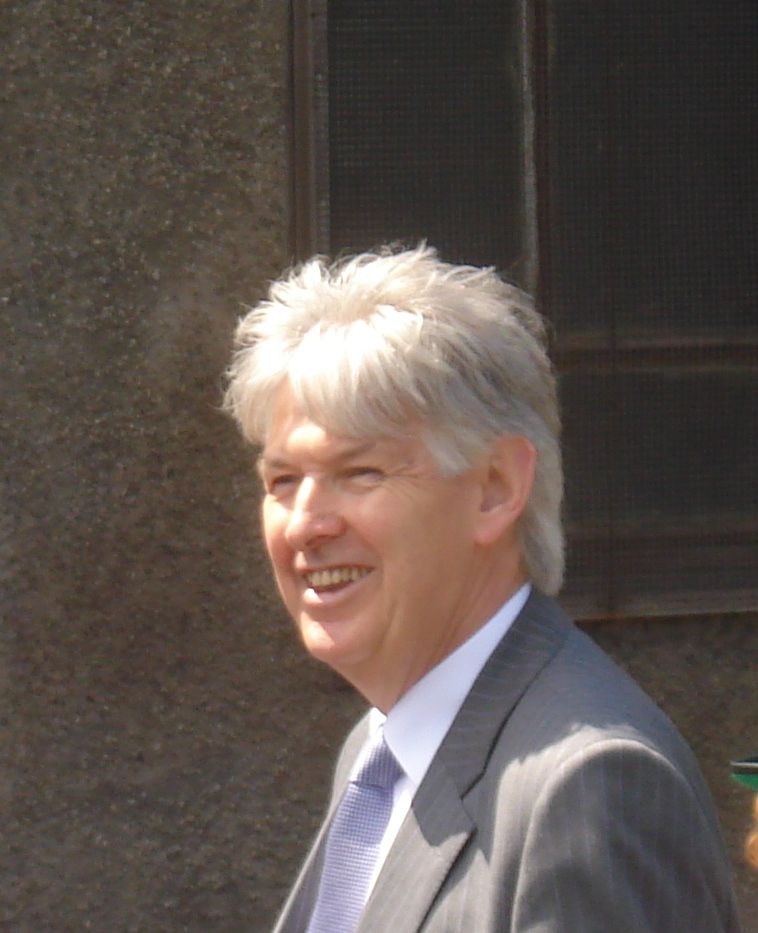

Member of Parliament for Linlithgow and East Falkirk Falkirk East (1992–2005)
- In office 9 April 1992 – 30 March 2015
- Preceded by: Harry Ewing
- Succeeded by: Martyn Day

Personal details
- Born: 3 September 1947 (age 79) Coatbridge, Lanarkshire, Scotland
- Party: Labour
- Spouse: Margaret Mary Doran
- Education: University of Glasgow, University of Stirling

Michael Connarty (born 3 September 1947) is a British Labour Party politician, who served as the Member of Parliament for Linlithgow and East Falkirk from 2005 until 2015, and Falkirk East (1992–2005).

== Parliamentary career ==
He unsuccessfully contested the parliamentary constituency of Stirling at the 1983 general election but finished 5,133 votes behind the future Conservative Secretary of State for Scotland Michael Forsyth. Connarty ran against Forsyth again at Stirling at the 1987 general election, although Forsyth won by a narrow margin of 548 votes.

Connarty was selected as the Labour candidate for Falkirk East at the 1992 general election following the retirement of the sitting MP, Harry Ewing. Connarty was elected with a majority of 7,969 votes. He used his maiden speech on 13 May 1992 to raise concerns about the fragility of the petro-chemical industry at Grangemouth, the largest town in Falkirk East.

Following the 1997 general election he became the parliamentary private secretary to the Minister of Film and Tourism Tom Clarke but this appointment lasted only until 1998 when Clarke was sacked from the government. Connarty spent his parliamentary career as a backbencher. In 1998, he became a member of the European Scrutiny Select committee, which is the committee responsible for scrutinising the legislation set by the European Parliament. He was appointed as the Chair of the committee from 2006 to 2010. In 2002, Connarty was one of three MPs behind the revival of the Tribune Group of left-wing Labour MPs.

As a result of the Fifth Periodical Review of the Boundary Commission for Scotland, the Falkirk East constituency was merged with Linlithgow and the new constituency was renamed Linlithgow and East Falkirk, and was elected to this new constituency in 2005. The Spectator awarded him the "Inquisitor of the Year Award" in the Threadneedle/Spectator Parliamentarian of the Year Awards in 2007, recognising his Chairmanship during the committee investigation into the Lisbon Treaty. In November 2008, he was one of 18 MPs who signed a Commons early day motion in support of forming a Team GB football team for the 2012 Olympic Games, contrary to the position held by the football governing bodies of Scotland, Wales and Northern Ireland who all had reservations that such a move would block them competing as individual nations in future tournaments.

In 2011, he was appointed a UK Parliament representative on the Parliamentary Assembly of the Council of Europe (PACE). In 2013, he was elected as Chair of the PACE sub-committee on Education, Youth and Sport issues. He successfully acted as rapporteur for a report on recommendations on "Youth Access to Fundamental Rights" adopted by the Parliamentary Assembly in April 2013. He was a member of a special Ad-hoc Sub Committee investigating "Governance and Corruption in Football" meeting with FIFA, UEFA and the ECA. The report was tabled by Anne Brasseur (ALDE, Luxembourg) and adopted by the Parliamentary Assembly in 2013. He was appointed Rapporteur for a follow – up report on The Reform of Football Governance focusing on FIFA and UEFA (and the awarding of the Football World Cup to Qatar by FIFA) in January 2014. After a series of hearings held in 2014, he authored a report that noted the extent of the corruption that was involved and recommended that the process should be rerun.

He is a supporter of Humanists UK and was co-chair of the All Party Parliamentary Jazz Appreciation Group. and vice president of the National Youth Jazz Collective.

Connarty was Vice Chair of the Parliamentary Group on Human Trafficking 2011–15. He was an active participant in the Parliamentarians Against Human Trafficking network working with like-minded politicians across the EU, set up by the Human Trafficking Foundation. His Private Members Bill, Transparency of UK Company Supply Chains, which would have required UK Companies to audit and report on the ethical quality of their supply chain, tabled in 2012, was "talked out" by Conservative MP for North East Somerset, Jacob Rees-Mogg, during its second reading on 18 January 2013.

During the 2014 Scottish independence referendum, Connarty campaigned with Better Together. He stood for re-election at the 2015 general election, but was defeated by the SNP candidate, Martyn Day, who won with a majority of 12,934.

== Personal life ==
He married Margaret Doran in 1969, and have a son and daughter together. They also have two granddaughters and a grandson. Connarty's uncle was killed in the 1971 McGurk's Bar bombing.

== Controversies ==
On 19 May 2009, the Daily Telegraph revealed that Connarty was the fifth highest claiming MP in the UK, having claimed £156,207 in allowances between 2007 and 2008, excluding travel costs.

Parliament of the United Kingdom
Preceded by Harry Ewing	Member of Parliament for Falkirk East; 1992–2005	Constituency abolished
New constituency	Member of Parliament for Linlithgow and East Falkirk; 2005–2015	Succeeded by Martyn Day
