= John Macdonald (British politician, born 1854) =

Scottish Liberal Party politician

John Macdonald PC

Member of Parliament for Stirling and Falkirk
- In office 25 November 1918 – 15 November 1922
- Preceded by: Arthur Ponsonby (Stirling Burghs)
- Succeeded by: Hugh Murnin

Member of Parliament for Falkirk Burghs
- In office 8 February 1906 – 25 November 1918
- Preceded by: John Wilson
- Succeeded by: Constituency abolished

Member of Parliament for Bow and Bromley
- In office 26 July 1892 – 7 August 1895
- Preceded by: John Colomb
- Succeeded by: Lionel Holland

Personal details
- Born: John Archibald Murray Macdonald; 9 October 1854
- Died: 16 January 1939 (aged 84)
- Party: National Liberal (1922–1923)
- Other political affiliations: Liberal Party (Before 1916); Coalition Liberal (1916–1922)
- Spouse: Alice Mary Noel
- Parent: Rev. H. F. Macdonald (father)
- Education: Glasgow High School
- Alma mater: University of Glasgow; University of Edinburgh

John Archibald Murray Macdonald (9 October 1854 – 16 January 1939) was a Scottish Liberal Party politician.

== Early life and career ==
The fourth son of the Rev. H. F. Macdonald DD, Strachur, Argyllshire, he was educated at Glasgow High School, the University of Glasgow and the University of Edinburgh.

== Political career ==
He was Liberal Member of Parliament for Bow and Bromley from 1892 to 1895, for Falkirk Burghs from 1906 to 1918 and for Stirling and Falkirk Burghs from 1918 to 1922.

He was also an elected member of the London School Board for Marylebone in 1897 and 1900, resigning in 1902.

In 1911, he addressed a meeting of the Young Scots Society in Clydebank and advocated for devolution of political power to Scotland due to what he saw as the congestion of business at Westminster, claiming that Parliament was no longer "a deliberative assembly in the true sense."

He was appointed a Privy Counsellor in 1916.

== Personal life ==
In 1885 he married Alice Mary Noel, daughter of Edward H. Noel.

== Sources ==
- Who Was Who
- Leigh Rayment's Historical List of MPs
- Works (Worldcat)Macdonald, J. A. Murray

Parliament of the United Kingdom
Preceded by John Colomb	Member of Parliament for Bow and Bromley; 1892 – 1895	Succeeded by Lionel Holland
Preceded by John Wilson	Member of Parliament for Falkirk Burghs; 1906 – 1918	Constituency abolished
New constituency	Member of Parliament for Stirling and Falkirk Burghs; 1918 – 1922	Succeeded by Hugh Murnin
