= Robert Torrens O'Neill =

Irish politician who served in the UK House of Commons

The Honourable Robert Torrens O'Neill JP DL
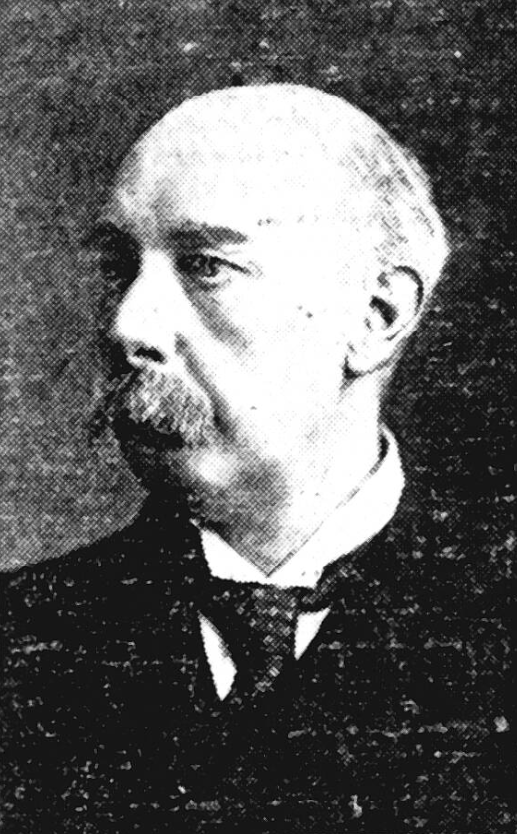

Member of Parliament for Antrim Mid
- In office 24 November 1885 – 15 January 1910
- Preceded by: Constituency established
- Succeeded by: Arthur O'Neill

Personal details
- Born: 10 January 1845 Ireland
- Died: 25 July 1910 (aged 65) St James's Square, Westminster, London
- Party: Conservative, Irish Unionist
- Parent(s): William O'Neill, 1st Baron O'Neill; Henrietta Torrens
- Education: Harrow School, Brasenose College, Oxford
- Military career
- Allegiance: United Kingdom
- Branch: British Army
- Service years: 1863–1885
- Rank: Colonel
- Unit: Royal Inniskilling Fusiliers

The Honourable Robert Torrens O'Neill (10 January 1845 – 25 July 1910) was an Irish Conservative, and later Irish Unionist politician who sat in the House of Commons of the United Kingdom from 1885 to 1910.

== Early life ==
O'Neill was the third son of William O'Neill, 1st Baron O'Neill (who was born William Chichester), and his first wife, Henrietta Torrens, daughter of Hon. Robert Torrens, a Judge of the Irish Court of Common Pleas. O'Neill was educated first at Harrow School and then at Brasenose College, Oxford, graduating with a B.A. and, later, an M.A.

== Military career ==
In 1863, Robert was commissioned as a lieutenant in the 4th Battalion of the Royal Inniskilling Fusiliers. He was promoted to captain two years later, and he later became a colonel in 1881. His military service was partially sidelined as his political career began, and he eventually retired in order to stand for election.

== Political career ==
O'Neill served as a sheriff of County Londonderry from 1869, and was the High Sheriff in 1871. He was also made deputy lieutenant for the county later that year, and later served as a justice of the peace for County Antrim. In the 1880's O'Neill was a member of the board of director, and later chairman of the Draperstown Railway.

In 1885 O'Neill stood in the by-election for the constituency of Antrim, following the death of James Chaine. He was defeated by the Liberal candidate, William Pirrie Sinclair. Several months later, he was able to stand again in the general election, and was elected as the first Member of Parliament for Antrim Mid, which had been created following the redistribution of seats. He was returned four times unopposed between 1886 and 1906, and defeated John Hamilton Verschoyle in his final election in 1906.

He did not stand for re-election in January 1910, citing his failing health and age. His nephew Arthur, who Robert had put forward as his successor, served as MP until his own death during WW1 in 1914, and his brother, Hugh was MP until the constituency was abolished in 1922.

== Personal life and death ==
O'Neill, was heavily involved in a number of charitable institutions, and succeeded his father as president of the Royal Belfast Hospital for Sick Children in 1883. He was a member of both the Carlton Club and Junior Carlton Club. He was never married and died on 25 July 1910 at his London residence, 11 St James's Square, Westminster, following a long illness.

Parliament of the United Kingdom
| New constituency | Member of Parliament for Antrim Mid; 1885 – January 1910 | Succeeded by Arthur O'Neill |
