= William Downe Gillon =

British politician

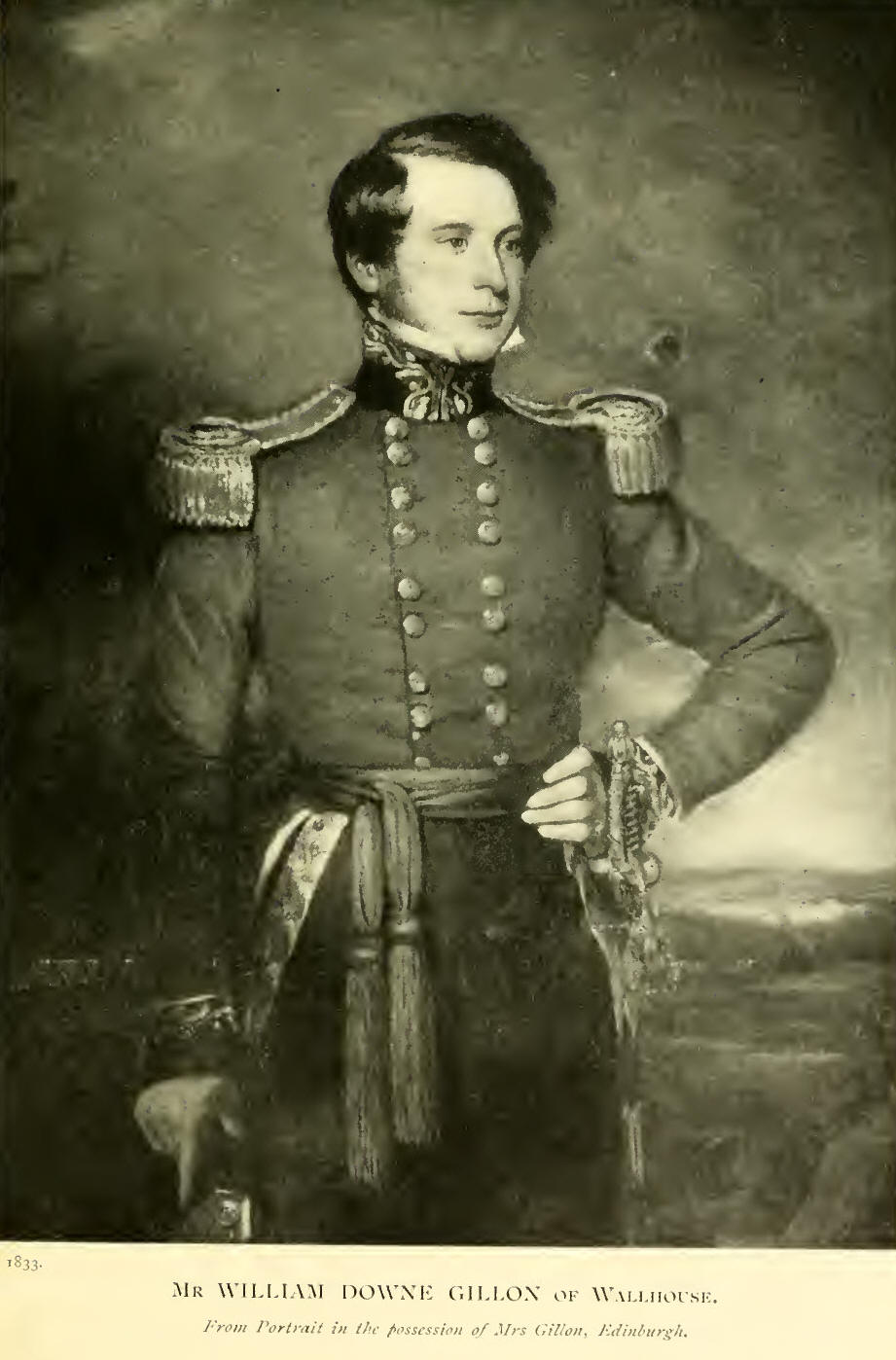
William Downe Gillon

William Downe Gillon (31 August 1801 – 7 October 1846) was a Scottish Whig politician.

The son of Andrew Gillon of Wallhouse (Linlithgowshire (now West Lothian)), Lieut-Col. in the Scots Fusilier Guards and Mary Anne Downe, daughter of William Downe of Downe Hall, Dorset, he was educated at Trinity College, Cambridge.

He was elected at the 1831 general election as the Member of Parliament (MP) for the Lanark Burghs. That constituency was abolished by the Scottish Reform Act 1832, and at the 1832 general election he was returned for the new Falkirk Burghs. He was returned unopposed in 1835 and 1837, but defeated at the 1841 general election by the Conservative Party candidate William Baird.

William Downe Gillon was a major beneficiary of his elder cousin John Gillon's (d. 1809) will, including profits coming from the plantation at Wallhouse, Dominica, housing 137 enslaved people in 1817. This gave Downe Gillon an annuity of £500 per annum and the purchase of Herstmonceux Castle.

== Freemasonry ==
Gillon was Initiated into Scottish Freemasonry in the Lodge of Holyrood House (St Luke's), No.44, on 29 November 1828. He was Master of the Lodge from 1843 until his death in 1846. He was the first Provincial Grand Master of Linlithgowshire, the name remains unchanged for Masonic purposes, and served 1832 until his death. His son, Andrew (1823-1888), was also a Scottish Freemason and Affiliated to his late father's Lodge in 1849.

Parliament of the United Kingdom
Preceded by Henry Monteith	Member of Parliament for Lanark Burghs; 1831 – 1832	constituency abolished
New constituency	Member of Parliament for Falkirk Burghs; 1832 – 1841	Succeeded by William Baird
