= Falkirk Burghs =

Parliamentary constituency in the United Kingdom, 1832–1918

- Former district of Burghs constituency for the House of Commons
- Major settlements: Falkirk, Airdrie, Hamilton, Lanark and Linlithgow

1832–1918
- Seats: One
- Created from: Lanarkshire, Linlithgow Burghs, and Stirlingshire
- Replaced by: Stirling & Falkirk Burghs, Hamilton, Lanark and Linlithgowshire

Falkirk Burghs was a district of burghs constituency of the House of Commons of the Parliament of the United Kingdom from 1832 to 1918. The constituency comprised the burghs of Falkirk, Airdrie, Hamilton, Lanark and Linlithgow, lying in Stirlingshire, Lanarkshire and Linlithgowshire.

In 1918, Falkirk became part of Stirling and Falkirk Burghs, Hamilton and Lanark formed the core of new Hamilton and Lanark constituencies, and Linlithgow was represented as part of Linlithgowshire.

== Members of Parliament ==
Election	Member	Party	Notes
1832	William Downe Gillon	Radical	
1841	William Baird	Conservative	
1846 by-election	Henry Pelham-Clinton, Earl of Lincoln	Conservative	later Duke of Newcastle
1851 by-election	James Baird	Conservative	
1857	James Merry	Radical	
1857 by-election	John Hamilton	Radical	later Baron Hamilton of Dalzell
1859	James Merry	Liberal	
1874	John Ramsay	Liberal	
1886	William Pirrie Sinclair	Liberal Unionist	
1892	Harry Smith	Liberal	
1895	John Wilson	Liberal Unionist	
1906	John Macdonald	Liberal	
1916	John Macdonald	Coalition Liberal	Contested Stirling and Falkirk following redistribution
1918	constituency abolished		

== Elections ==
=== Elections in the 1830s ===
General election 1832: Falkirk Burghs
Party	Candidate	Votes	%
Radical	William Downe Gillon	505	58.3
Whig	Charles Murray	361	41.7
Majority		144	16.6
Turnout		866	89.4
Registered electors		969	
Radical win (new seat)			

General election 1835: Falkirk Burghs
Party	Candidate	Votes	%
Radical	William Downe Gillon	Unopposed	
Registered electors		1,046	
Radical hold			

General election 1837: Falkirk Burghs
Party	Candidate	Votes	%
Radical	William Downe Gillon	Unopposed	
Registered electors		1,177	
Radical hold			

=== Elections in the 1840s ===
General election 1841: Falkirk Burghs
Party	Candidate	Votes	%	±%
Conservative	William Baird	484	52.8	New
Radical	William Downe Gillon	433	47.2	N/A
Majority		51	5.6	N/A
Turnout		917	67.0	N/A
Registered electors		1,369		
Conservative gain from Radical		Swing	N/A	

Baird resigned by accepting the office of Steward of the Chiltern Hundreds, causing a by-election.

By-election, 2 May 1846: Falkirk Burghs
Party	Candidate	Votes	%	±%
Conservative	Earl of Lincoln	506	50.5	−2.3
Whig	John Wilson	495	49.5	+2.3
Majority		11	1.0	−4.4
Turnout		1,001	75.2	+8.2
Registered electors		1,332		
Conservative hold		Swing	−2.3	

General election 1847: Falkirk Burghs
Party	Candidate	Votes	%	±%
Conservative	Earl of Lincoln	522	51.5	−1.3
Whig	William Sprott Boyd	491	48.5	+1.3
Majority		31	3.0	−2.6
Turnout		1,013	70.5	+3.5
Registered electors		1,437		
Conservative hold		Swing	−1.3	

=== Elections in the 1850s ===
Pelham-Clinton succeeded to the peerage, becoming 5th Duke of Newcastle and causing a by-election.

By-election, 14 February 1851: Falkirk Burghs
Party	Candidate	Votes	%	±%
Conservative	James Baird	590	52.0	+0.5
Whig	George Loch	544	48.0	−0.5
Majority		46	4.0	+1.0
Turnout		1,134	64.8	−5.7
Registered electors		1,749		
Conservative hold		Swing	+0.5	

General election 1852: Falkirk Burghs
Party	Candidate	Votes	%	±%
Conservative	James Baird	579	52.3	+0.8
Whig	James Anderson	529	47.7	−0.8
Majority		50	4.6	+1.6
Turnout		1,108	58.2	−12.3
Registered electors		1,905		
Conservative hold		Swing	+0.8	

General election 1857: Falkirk Burghs
Party	Candidate	Votes	%	±%
Radical	James Merry	770	61.1	+13.4
Conservative	George Baird	491	38.9	−13.4
Majority		279	22.2	N/A
Turnout		1,261	85.6	+27.4
Registered electors		1,473		
Radical gain from Conservative		Swing	+13.4	

Merry's election was declared void on petition due to bribery by "injudicious partisans", causing a by-election.

By-election, 8 August 1857: Falkirk Burghs
Party	Candidate	Votes	%	±%
Radical	John Hamilton	Unopposed		
Radical hold				

General election 1859: Falkirk Burghs
Party	Candidate	Votes	%	±%
Liberal	James Merry	Unopposed		
Registered electors		1,540		
Liberal hold				

=== Elections in the 1860s ===
General election 1865: Falkirk Burghs
Party	Candidate	Votes	%	±%
Liberal	James Merry	683	62.0	N/A
Conservative	Frederick James Halliday	419	38.0	New
Majority		264	24.0	N/A
Turnout		1,102	73.0	N/A
Registered electors		1,510		
Liberal hold		Swing	N/A	

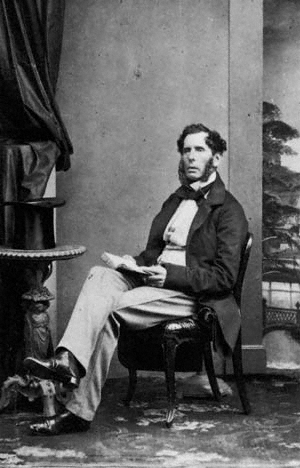
Horsman

General election 1868: Falkirk Burghs
Party	Candidate	Votes	%	±%
Liberal	James Merry	1,724	99.1	+37.1
Independent Liberal	Edward Horsman	16	0.9	New
Majority		1,708	98.2	+74.2
Turnout		1,740	37.0	−36.0
Registered electors		4,704		
Liberal hold		Swing		

=== Elections in the 1870s ===
General election 1874: Falkirk Burghs
Party	Candidate	Votes	%	±%
Liberal	John Ramsay	2,583	56.9	−42.2
Conservative	Alexander Baird	1,958	43.1	New
Majority		625	13.8	−84.4
Turnout		4,541	87.9	+50.9
Registered electors		5,165		
Liberal hold		Swing		

Ramsay was disqualified from office, due to his holding of a Government contract at the time of the election. He stood again unopposed at a by-election.

By-election, 26 Mar 1874: Falkirk Burghs
Party	Candidate	Votes	%	±%
Liberal	John Ramsay	Unopposed		
Liberal hold				

=== Elections in the 1880s ===
General election 1880: Falkirk Burghs
Party	Candidate	Votes	%	±%
Liberal	John Ramsay	3,270	74.1	+17.2
Conservative	William Bell McTaggart	1,140	25.9	−17.2
Majority		2,130	48.2	+34.4
Turnout		4,410	82.7	−5.2
Registered electors		5,333		
Liberal hold		Swing	+17.2	

Weir

General election 1885: Falkirk Burghs
Party	Candidate	Votes	%	±%
Liberal	John Ramsay	3,104	50.6	−23.5
Conservative	Samuel Leck Mason	2,204	35.9	+10.0
Independent Liberal	James Galloway Weir	814	13.3	N/A
Hamilton Liberal Association	John Roskill	14	0.2	N/A
Majority		900	14.7	−33.6
Turnout		6,136	85.9	+3.2
Registered electors		7,142		
Liberal hold		Swing	−16.8	

The Hamilton Liberal Association nominated Roskill in protest against Ramsay. However, arbitration later led to their support for Ramsay and Roskill's withdrawal from the race. Weir did not agree to take part in the arbitration.

General election 1886: Falkirk Burghs
Party	Candidate	Votes	%	±%
Liberal Unionist	William Pirrie Sinclair	2,712	50.2	+14.3
Liberal	Harry Smith	2,693	49.8	−0.8
Majority		19	0.4	N/A
Turnout		5,405	75.7	−10.2
Registered electors		7,142		
Liberal Unionist gain from Liberal		Swing	+7.5	

=== Elections in the 1890s ===
General election 1892: Falkirk Burghs
Party	Candidate	Votes	%	±%
Liberal	Harry Smith	3,816	54.6	+4.8
Liberal Unionist	William Pirrie Sinclair	3,177	45.4	−4.8
Majority		639	9.2	N/A
Turnout		6,993	83.1	+7.4
Registered electors		8,412		
Liberal gain from Liberal Unionist		Swing	+4.8	

General election 1895: Falkirk Burghs
Party	Candidate	Votes	%	±%
Liberal Unionist	John Wilson	4,075	51.6	+6.2
Liberal	Harry Smith	3,822	48.4	−6.2
Majority		253	3.2	N/A
Turnout		7,897	84.3	+1.2
Registered electors		9,363		
Liberal Unionist gain from Liberal		Swing	+6.2	

=== Elections in the 1900s ===
Macdonald

General election 1900: Falkirk Burghs
Party	Candidate	Votes	%	±%
Liberal Unionist	John Wilson	4,222	51.2	−0.4
Liberal	John Macdonald	4,022	48.8	+0.4
Majority		200	2.4	−0.8
Turnout		8,244	79.4	−4.9
Registered electors		10,388		
Liberal Unionist hold		Swing	−0.4	

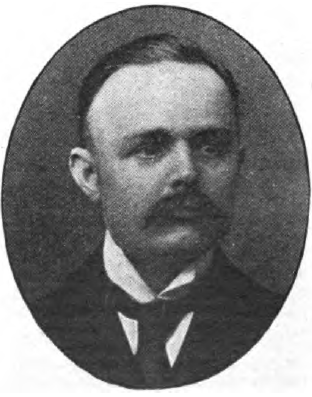
Gilmour

General election 1906: Falkirk Burghs
Party	Candidate	Votes	%	±%
Liberal	John Macdonald	5,158	51.0	+2.2
Conservative	Henry Keith	3,176	31.5	−19.7
Scottish Workers	David Gilmour	1,763	17.5	New
Majority		1,982	19.5	N/A
Turnout		10,097	83.7	+4.3
Registered electors		12,068		
Liberal gain from Liberal Unionist		Swing	+5.9	

=== Elections in the 1910s ===
General election January 1910: Falkirk Burghs
Party	Candidate	Votes	%	±%
Liberal	John Macdonald	6,524	59.9	+8.9
Conservative	Henry Keith	4,375	40.1	+8.6
Majority		2,149	19.8	+0.3
Turnout		10,899	84.6	+0.9
Liberal hold		Swing	+0.2	

General election December 1910: Falkirk Burghs
Party	Candidate	Votes	%	±%
Liberal	John Macdonald	6,276	59.7	–0.2
Conservative	Daniel Young	4,245	40.3	+0.2
Majority		2,031	19.4	–0.4
Turnout		10,521	80.0	–4.6
Liberal hold		Swing	–0.2	

General Election 1914–15:

Another General Election was required to take place before the end of 1915. The political parties had been making preparations for an election to take place and by July 1914, the following candidates had been selected;

- Liberal: John Macdonald
- Unionist: Sir James Robertson Wilson, 2nd Baronet
- British Socialist Party:
