= Auchmeddan Castle =

Former castle in Aberdeenshire, Scotland

Coordinates: 57.672453°N 2.251541°W

Auchmedden Castle was less a castle and more a lairds house, large enough to hold ten children and featured a well-stocked library. It most likely dated to the end of the 15th or the beginning of the 16th century. It fell to ruin and today there is no longer a trace. The Auchmedden estate extends 3 miles west-to-east and 6 miles north-to-south. The Mains of Auchmedden is located 9 miles (14 km) west of Fraserburgh, Aberdeenshire, Scotland.Subclade distance 0 An alternative spelling was Auchmedden Castle.

== History ==
The Registrum Magni Sigilli Regum Scotorum, 1513-1546, by J. Balfour Paul, page 320 provides us with a record showing that the King confirmed the charter of Andree Baird (Andrew Baird) of Laveroklaw on 28 October 1534 for the purchase of the land of Glencuthill with mill and the Lands of Auchmedden, in the barony of Glendowanquhy, vicinity of Banff. Andrew became 1st of Auchmedden and his heirs held Auchmedden for eight generations until it was sold by William Baird, 8th of Auchmedden in 1750, after 216 years.

It was acquired by the Earls of Aberdeen, Gordons, in the mid 18th century. The castle fell to ruin in the late 18th century. The estate was purchased by Robert Baird, though from another family, in 1854, seemingly because it represented a connection with the earlier Baird gentry family, with whom there was believed to be a distant connection. The estate was later inherited by Robert's brother James and then by their nephew George Alexander Baird.

Up to 1913 part of the south wall, and some scattered stone, could be traced; but by 1965 there was no trace and the site was under cultivation. It is believed that some of the material from the demolition was used in the construction of Denburn House in New Pitsligo, in particular panelling and timber work.

== Position ==
The structure was on the side of a ravine, the Den of Auchmedden, leading northwards to the coast at the village of Pennan.

== Tradition ==
Thomas the Rhymer supposedly prophesied that "there shall be an eagle in the craig while there is a Bird in Auchmedden", and when the Bairds left the property a pair of eagles which nested on a crag near the castle are supposed to have left too.
