= James Merry (Scottish politician) =

Scottish ironmaster, race-horse breeder and Liberal politician

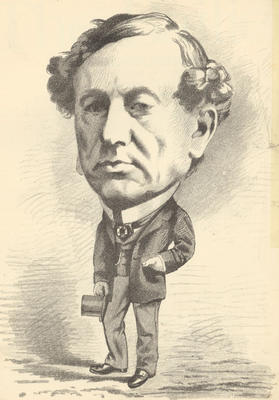
Caricature of James Merry. Anonymous, circa 1860

James Merry (1805 – 3 February 1877) was a Scottish ironmaster and race-horse breeder, and a Liberal politician who sat in the House of Commons from 1859 to 1874.

Merry was the son of James Merry, merchant of Glasgow, and his wife Janet Creelman, daughter of W. Creelman. He was educated at the University of Glasgow and became an ironmaster in Lanarkshire and Ayrshire.

He was an influential member of "the Turf", and breeder of some of the best English race-horses including the 1860 Derby winner Thormanby, Dundee, Buckstone and Scottish Chief. He also won the Derby in 1873 with Doncaster. He employed leading trainers including Mathew Dawson and James Waugh.

Merry was a Deputy Lieutenant and J.P. for Inverness-shire. He stood unsuccessfully for parliament at Glasgow in February 1857. He was elected MP for Falkirk Burghs in April 1857 but was unseated on petition the following July. At the 1859 general election he was again elected for Falkirk Burghs and held the seat until 1874.

In 1857 Merry bought the Belladrum Estate, near Beauly.

Merry died at the age of 70. He had married Ann McHardy, daughter of James McHardy of Glenboig, Lanarkshire in 1847.

Merry Island, off the Sunshine Coast of British Columbia, is named for him.

Parliament of the United Kingdom
Preceded by James Baird	Member of Parliament for Falkirk Burghs; 1859–1857	Succeeded by John Hamilton
Preceded by John Hamilton	Member of Parliament for Falkirk Burghs; 1859–1874	Succeeded by John Ramsay
