= Lucy Martin Ramsay =

Scottish antiquarian

Lucy Ramsay
- Born: Lucy Martin; November 10, 1850; Row, Dunbartonshire, Scotland
- Died: July 4, 1905 (aged 54); Cairnmore, Islay, Argyll, Scotland
- Other name: Mrs Ramsay of Kildalton
- Occupations: Antiquarian and editor
- Known for: Contributions to Islay archaeology; Stent Book of Islay (1890)
- Spouse: John Ramsay (of Kildalton)

Lucy Ramsay (née Martin; 10 November 1850 – 4 July 1905), often referred to in nineteenth-century sources as Mrs Ramsay of Kildalton, was a Scottish antiquarian and editor who documented archaeological sites on the island of Islay in Argyll, Scotland. In 1883, she was elected a Lady Associate of the Society of Antiquaries of Scotland. She contributed to the Society’s collections, published research on Islay antiquities, and edited and published the Stent Book of Islay (1890).

== Life ==
Lucy Martin was born in the Dunbartonshire parish of Row, now Rhu. Her parents were George Martin, a wealthy East India merchant, and his wife, Mary Ann Maclellan, both originally from Glasgow; Lucy was the third of their six children. From the 1860s, the family home was Auchendennan House (near Arden, Argyll) on Loch Lomond.

In November 1871, she married the Port Ellen distiller and Liberal Party politician John Ramsay, who was 36 years her senior. They lived at Kildalton, Islay, and had four children: Mary Ann (b. 1874), Elizabeth Lucy (b. 1877), Iain (b. 1878), and John (b. 1879). Following her husband's death in 1892, Ramsay inherited and continued to manage the Port Ellen distillery until her own death in 1905, aged 54.

== Antiquarian work ==
Ramsay was active in the investigation and documentation of archaeological sites on Islay, particularly in and around Kildalton. Her research drew on information provided by local residents, whose knowledge of sites and traditions informed her writings.

In 1883, she presented to the Society of Antiquaries of Scotland a series of casts of early carved stones from Islay, including a full-scale cast of the Kildalton Cross. With this donation she provided detailed notes describing the condition, location, and discovery of each item. Her account of the Kildalton Cross records the excavation of its base and the discovery of an incised slab beneath it, along with associated stones and human remains. She is also reported to have sent carved stones from the nearby island of Texa to the Society’s collection.

In December 1885, a leaf-shaped bronze sword of the Ewart Park type was discovered during drainage work at Leannan Buidhe (Yellow Hollow) on the farm of Lower Coilabus in the Oa of Islay. Ramsay visited the site early in January 1886 and arranged for an excavation to investigate the find. Her account, published the following year in the Proceedings of the Society of Antiquaries of Scotland, records the circumstances of the discovery and the results of her examination of the peat deposits in which the sword had been embedded.

Ramsay also undertook historical research relating to the land use and administration of Islay. She edited and published the Stent Book of Islay (1890), a record of the minutes of a local governing body responsible for regulating rents and agricultural practices on the island, which she prepared from earlier manuscript sources and issued with an editorial preface.
