= Robert Curran (Scottish politician) =

Scottish politician (1923–1995)

Robert Curran (14 September 1923 – 28 September 1995) was a Scottish nationalist political activist. He was youngest Provost in Scotland, and the first SNP provost. He stood as an SNP candidate in the Stirling and Falkirk by-election of 1948 and for Stirling and Falkirk in the 1950 general election.

== Biography ==
Born in Alva, Clackmannanshire, Curran moved with his family to Canada in his childhood, returning to Scotland to study at Alva Academy. Working as a confectioner, he joined the Scottish National Party (SNP) in the early 1940s, and in 1944 was elected for the party to Alva Burgh Council. When only 25, he became the youngest Provost in Scotland, and the first SNP provost in Scotland. During this time, he expressed a strong interest in Georgism.

Curran stood for the SNP in the 1948 Stirling and Falkirk by-election, taking 8.5% of the vote and third place; then again stood in Stirling and Falkirk at the 1950 general election, his vote share falling to 3.8%. From 1951 until 1953, Curran served as National Secretary of the party, and he then ran the SNP's organising committee for a year, during which time he founded the National League for Young Scots. He emigrated again to Canada, returning to Scotland in 1974. On his return, he again became involved with the SNP, and in 1980 was elected to Clackmannan District Council, serving for four years.

Party political offices
Preceded by Mary Fraser Dott	National Secretary of the Scottish National Party; 1951–1953	Succeeded by John Smart
