= Ian Keith, 12th Earl of Kintore =

British noble

The Right Honourable The Earl of Kintore DL

Personal details
- Born: James Ian Baird; 25 July 1908
- Died: 1 October 1989 (aged 81)
- Spouse: Delia Virginia Loyd (after 1935)
- Relations: Sir Alexander Baird, 1st Baronet (grandfather); Algernon Keith-Falconer, 9th Earl of Kintore (grandfather)
- Children: 3
- Parent: John Baird, 1st Viscount Stonehaven
- Education: Eton College
- Alma mater: Imperial College London
- Known for: Chief of Clan Keith

Military service
- Branch/service: Royal Marine Engineers
- Rank: Major
- Battles/wars: World War II

James Ian Keith, 12th Earl of Kintore DL (25 July 1908 – 1 October 1989), known as Viscount Stonehaven between 1941 and 1974, and Chief of Clan Keith from 1974 on, was a Scottish peer and nobleman.

== Early life ==
Keith was born James Ian Baird on 25 July 1908 but usually went by his middle name Ian. He was the eldest son of the Governor-General of Australia and Minister for Transport John Baird, 1st Viscount Stonehaven and Ethel Sydney Keith-Falconer, 11th Countess of Kintore. His younger brother was Hon. Robert Alexander Greville Baird of the Royal Air Force (who married Dorviegelda Malvina MacGregor, eldest daughter of Alexander Ronald MacGregor and a descendant of Rear Admiral Sir Malcolm Murray-MacGregor, 4th Baronet and Hugh McDonnell, 4th Earl of Antrim); Lady Annette Baird (wife of Michael Henry Mason, only son of James Francis Mason of Eynsham Hall and Lady Margaret Lindsay, only daughter of James Lindsay, 26th Earl of Crawford); Lady Ariel Baird, a Lady-in-Waiting to Princess Alice, Countess of Athlone (who married Kenneth Keith, Baron Keith of Castleacre); and Lady Ava Baird (wife of Ronald Chance, eldst son of Walter Lucas Chance of Millgreen House).

His paternal grandparents were Sir Alexander Baird, 1st Baronet and Hon. Annette Maria Palk (a daughter of Lawrence Palk, 1st Baron Haldon). His maternal grandparents were Algernon Keith-Falconer, 9th Earl of Kintore and the former Lady Sydney Charlotte Montagu (the eldest daughter of George Montagu, 6th Duke of Manchester and, his second wife, Harriet Sydney Dobbs, fifth daughter of Conway Richard Dobbs). His maternal uncle was Arthur Keith-Falconer, 10th Earl of Kintore who married Helena Montagu (former wife of William Montagu, 9th Duke of Manchester), but died without issue.

In his youth, he worked as a labourer in Britain and Canada. He was educated at Eton College before attending the Royal School of Mines at Imperial College London. Later he was registered as an Associate of the Institution of Structural Engineers.

== Career ==
In 1941, he succeeded to the viscountcy of Stonehaven upon the death of his father. During the Second World War, he joined the Royal Marine Engineers and rose to the rank of Major. From 1947 to 1952, Lord Stonehaven lived in South Africa when he returned to manage the family estate at Rickarton. In 1954, he held the office of Member of the Kincardineshire County Council and the office of Deputy Lieutenant of Kincardineshire in 1959.

Between 1965 and 1976, he held the office of Vice-Lord Lieutenant of Hampshire. In 1966, his maternal uncle Arthur died without issue, and his mother became Countess of Kintore. The following year, Lord Stonehaven legally changed his name from Baird to Keith by Interlocutor of the Lyon Court on 28 June 1967. In 1974, he succeeded his mother as the 12th Earl of Kintore. He also held the office of Member of the Grampian Regional Council in 1974. He was admitted to the Royal Company of Archers.

In 1978, the Chief of Clan Keith and the Commander of Clan Gunn signed a peace treaty at the site of the Chapel of St. Tayrs, ending the feud between the two clans which began in 1478.

== Marriage and issue ==
On 5 March 1935, Lord Kintore was married to Delia Virginia Loyd (1915–2007), the only daughter of William Lewis Brownlow Loyd of Upper House and the former Hon. Bettine Henrietta Knatchbull-Hugessen (second daughter of Edward Knatchbull-Hugessen, 2nd Baron Brabourne). Together, they were the parents of three children:

- Lady Diana Elizabeth Virginia Sydney Keith (b. 1937), who married John Francis Holman of Rickarton, OBE (1924–2015), eldest son of Alexander McArthur Holman, of Jersey, Channel Islands.
- Michael Keith, 13th Earl of Kintore (1939–2004), who married Mary Plum, daughter of Squadron Leader Elisha Gaddis Plum, who lived at Rumson, New Jersey.
- Hon. Alexander David Keith (b. 1946), who was educated at Tabley House School and, in 2003, lived at 2 Tilquhillie Place, Banchory.

Lord Kintore died on 1 October 1989. Lady Kintore died on 10 January 2007.

=== Descendants ===
Through his daughter Lady Diana, he was a grandfather of four, including: Richard Ian Holman-Baird of Ury and Lochwood (b. 1958); Edward Alexander Holman (b. 1960), Georgina Mary Holman (b. 1962); and Emma Charlotte Holman (b. 1966).

Through his son Michael, he was a grandfather of James Keith, 14th Earl of Kintore (b. 1976), who married and had one son, Tristan Michael Keith, Lord Keith of Inverurie and Keith Hall (b. 2010), heir apparent to the earldom of Kintore. He was also the grandfather of Lady Iona Delia Mary Gaddis Keith (b. 1978), who married Mark Hopkins, younger son of Mrs. Violet Hopkins, of Welwyn Garden City, Hertfordshire, in 2008.

Peerage of Scotland
Preceded by Ethel Sydney Keith-Falconer	Earl of Kintore; 1974–1989	Succeeded by Michael Keith
Peerage of the United Kingdom
Preceded by John Baird	Viscount Stonehaven; 1941–1989	Succeeded by Michael Keith
