= Hugh Murnin =

Scottish Labour politician and trade unionist

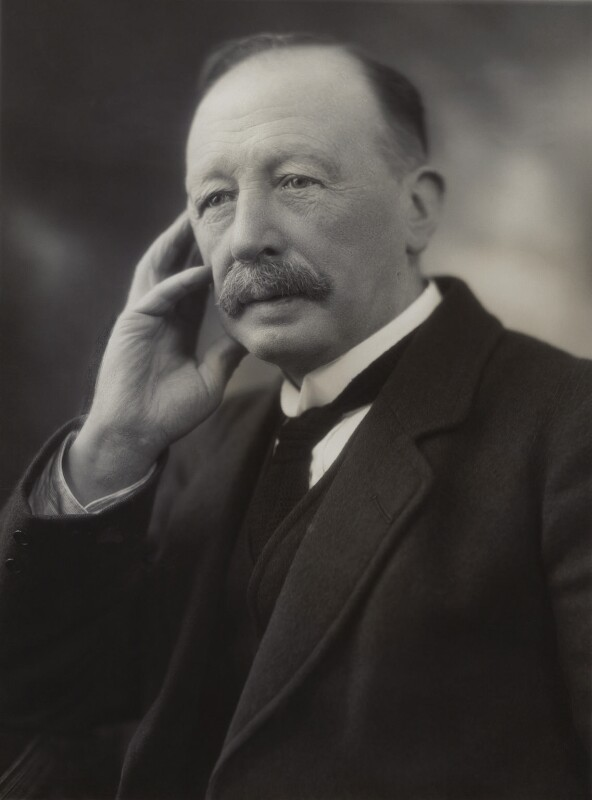
- Murnin in 1923

Member of Parliament for Stirling and Falkirk Burghs
- In office 1922–1923
- Constituency: Stirling and Falkirk Burghs
- In office 1924–1931

President of the National Union of Scottish Mineworkers
- In office 1920–1922

Personal details
- Born: 12 July 1865 Bathgate, Scotland
- Died: 11 March 1932 (aged 66)
- Party: Labour
- Occupation: Miner, trade unionist, politician

Hugh Murnin (12 July 1865 – 11 March 1932) born Bathgate was a Scottish politician, Labour MP for Stirling and Falkirk Burghs from 1922 to 1923, and from 1924 to 1931.

Murnin left elementary school aged nine, entered the mines, and worked his way up to become checkweighman at Bannockburn Colliery in 1891, then agent to the Stirlingshire Miners' County Union from 1897, and serving as President of the National Union of Scottish Mineworkers from 1920 to 1922, then as vice-president for a few more years.

A Roman Catholic, Murnin apparently suggested the formation of a centrist Scottish Catholic party in 1912. Like Joseph Sullivan (1866–1935), another Catholic miner, Murnin first managed to be elected to Parliament in 1922.

Parliament of the United Kingdom
Preceded by John Macdonald	Member of Parliament for Stirling and Falkirk Burghs; 1922–1923	Succeeded by Sir George McCrae
Preceded by Sir George McCrae	Member of Parliament for Stirling and Falkirk Burghs; 1924–1931	Succeeded by James Reid
Trade union offices
Preceded by John Robertson	President of the National Union of Scottish Mineworkers; 1920–1922	Succeeded by Robert Smillie
