= Sir John Wilson, 1st Baronet =

British politician

Sir John Wilson, 1st Baronet (26 June 1844 – 28 July 1918) was a businessman and Liberal Unionist politician in Scotland. He was Chairman of the Wilsons and Clyde Coal Company, and was Member of Parliament (MP) for Falkirk Burghs from 1895 to 1906.

He was made a baronet on 27 July 1906, of Airdrie in New Monkland in the County of Lanark.

Parliament of the United Kingdom
| Preceded by Harry Smith | Member of Parliament for Falkirk Burghs; 1895–1906 | Succeeded by John Macdonald |
Baronetage of the United Kingdom
| New creation | Baronet (of Airdrie); 1906–1918 | Succeeded by James Robertson Wilson |
