= Harry Ewing, Baron Ewing of Kirkford =

British politician (1931–2007)

Member of Parliament for Falkirk East Stirling, Falkirk and Grangemouth (February 1974–1983) Stirling and Falkirk (1971–February 1974)
- In office 16 September 1971 – 16 March 1992
- Preceded by: Malcolm MacPherson
- Succeeded by: Michael Connarty

Member of the House of Lords
- Lord Temporal
- Life peerage 17 July 1992 – 9 June 2007

Personal details
- Born: 20 January 1931 Cowdenbeath, Fife, Scotland
- Died: 9 June 2007 (aged 76) Dunfermline, Fife
- Party: Labour
- Spouse: Margaret Greenhill (m. 1954)

Harry Ewing, Baron Ewing of Kirkford, PC, DL (20 January 1931 – 9 June 2007) was a Labour Party politician in Scotland. He served as a Member of Parliament (MP) for 21 years, from a by-election in 1971 until the 1992 general election, when he became a life peer. He served as a junior minister in the Scottish Office from 1974 to 1979, responsible for devolution, and later chaired the Scottish Constitutional Convention from 1989 to 1996.

== Early life ==
Ewing was born in Cowdenbeath, where his father, William Ewing, was a miner and Labour party activist. He was educated at Foulford primary school and Beath High School, and did National Service in the Royal Air Force from 1949 to 1951. He worked as a fitter in a foundry, where he was active in the Amalgamated Union of Foundry Workers, and then became a postman in 1962, becoming active in the Union of Post Office Workers.

== Parliamentary career ==
Ewing stood for the Labour Party in the safe Conservative seat of East Fife in the 1970 general election, losing to the sitting MP Sir John Gilmour. He became Member of Parliament for Stirling and Falkirk at a by-election in September 1971, following the death of Malcolm MacPherson. His seat was renamed Stirling, Falkirk and Grangemouth for the general election in February 1974; despite swings to the Scottish Nationalists, he retained the seat in February and in October 1974, but with a much reduced majority. Harold Wilson appointed him as Under-Secretary of State for Scotland with responsibility for devolution and home affairs, retaining that position under Jim Callaghan as the Labour government pushed forward with a proposal for Scottish devolution. The eventual referendum in March 1979 failed to pass by a sufficient majority. The Labour government fell at the ensuing 1979 general election, although Ewing retained his seat with a substantially increased majority. He became a front-bench spokesman on Scottish industry in 1981. He came third in the ballot for chair of the Parliamentary Labour Party in November 1981. His seat was redrawn again at the 1983 general election, and he was returned for the successor seat of Falkirk East, and he became a spokesman on trade and industry matters under Neil Kinnock. He was reelected in 1987, and stood down from his front bench position. He was a joint chairman with David Steel of the Scottish Constitutional Convention formed in 1989 to plan for the devolution of Scotland that was planned if Labour won the 1992 general election. Labour lost the election, and the plans were shelved. Ewing retired from the House of Commons at the 1992 general election.

== House of Lords ==
After his retirement, Ewing was created a life peer taking the title Baron Ewing of Kirkford, of Cowdenbeath in the District of Dunfermline on 17 July 1992. He became a front bench spokesman on Scottish affairs in the House of Lords, but resigned in November 1996, also resigning from his position with the Constitutional Convention. He chaired an inquiry into housing for the disabled in 1993, and was appointed deputy lieutenant of Fife in 1995. He was chairman of Fife Healthcare NHS Trust from 1996 to 1998, honorary president of the Girls' Brigade of Scotland, and patron of Scottish Overseas Aid. He was a life member of Cowdenbeath Football Club (the Blue Brazil).

== Death ==
Ewing, who lived in Fife, died of cancer in hospital in Dunfermline in June 2007, at the age of 76. He was survived by his wife Margaret (née Greenhill), whom he married in 1954, and their son Alan and daughter Alison.

Parliament of the United Kingdom
Preceded by Malcolm MacPherson	Member of Parliament for Stirling and Falkirk; 1971 – February 1974	Constituency abolished
New constituency	Member of Parliament for Stirling, Falkirk and Grangemouth; February 1974 – 1983	Constituency abolished
New constituency	Member of Parliament for Falkirk East; 1983–1992	Succeeded by Michael Connarty
