= Ballycraigy =

Housing estate in Antrim town, Northern Ireland

- Townland
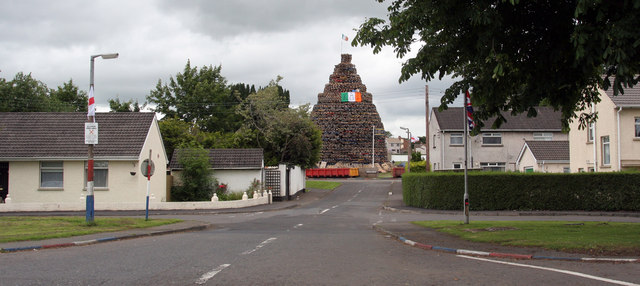
- Ballycraigy Bonfire Entrance to Ballycraigy housing estate in Antrim with the famed 11th of July bonfire ready to be lit

- Location within Northern Ireland
- Coordinates: 54°42′31″N 6°10′41″W
- Country: United Kingdom
- Province: Northern Ireland
- County: Antrim
- Town: Antrim

Ballycraigy (from Irish Baile na Creige, meaning 'townland of the rock') is a townland and housing estate in Antrim town, Northern Ireland. According to the census for Ballycraigy ward the estate has approximately 865 residents.

The Ballycraigy estate is almost wholly Protestant, and the estate is associated with Ulster loyalism. Ballycraigy has its own loyalist marching band, "Ballycraigy Sons of Ulster", with purple/lilac attire for their uniform. Every Eleventh of July, many Protestants celebrate by lighting a bonfire in the centre of the estate. In 2007 there was a legal threat over the inclusion of hundreds of tyres in the bonfire with the fear that excessive toxic fumes would be emitted; however it was not possible to establish who had been involved in placing them there, and the bonfire was allowed to go ahead.

On the Ballycraigy estate is a memorial garden dedicated to Billy Wright, leader of the Loyalist Volunteer Force paramilitary organisation.

There are two other townlands named Ballycraigy in County Antrim. One is in Larne and is the site of Ballycraigy Manor, a country house with a tower and battlements built in 1869, the residence of James Chaine, a businessman involved in shipping and a Conservative Party politician. The other is in the parish of Carnmoney.
