= William Pirrie Sinclair =

British politician

William Pirrie Sinclair (1837 – 1 November 1900) was a politician in the United Kingdom who was twice elected to the House of Commons for the Liberal Party.

Born in Belfast in 1837, son of Presbyterians John Sinclair and Eliza (née Pirrie) of Conlig near Bangor, County Down, he was educated at the Royal Belfast Academical Institution, Queen's College Belfast and Heidelberg University, Baden. He became a successful businessman in Liverpool, and was a Presbyterian Church elder.

He was asked in 1885 to stand in a by-election by the County Antrim Central Tenant Right Association, at a meeting in Liberal Party headquarters in Belfast. He declared his support for the extension of purchase provisions of the 1881 Land Act, and his opposition to Gladstone's Coercion Acts. He was elected on 21 May 1885 with a majority of 69 votes (less than 1% of the total) over the Conservative Party candidate Robert Torrens O'Neill. He held the seat only until Parliament was dissolved later that year for the 1885 general election, when the two-seat Antrim constituency was divided into four single-member divisions. Sinclair stood in North Antrim, where in a three-way contest he was defeated by the Conservative Edward MacNaghten.

When the Liberal Party split in 1886 over Irish Home Rule, Sinclair joined with the breakaway Liberal Unionist Party, and was elected at the 1886 general election as MP for Falkirk Burghs in Scotland, with a majority of only 19 votes (0.4% of the total) over the Liberal Party candidate. He lost the seat to the Liberals at the 1892 general election, and did not stand for Parliament again.

Parliament of the United Kingdom
Preceded by James Chaine; Edward Macnaghten	Member of Parliament for Antrim; May 1885 – October 1885; With: Edward Macnaghten	Constituency abolished
Preceded by John Ramsay	Member of Parliament for Falkirk Burghs; 1886–1892	Succeeded by Harry Smith
