= 1971 Stirling and Falkirk by-election =

UK parliamentary by-election

The 1971 Stirling and Falkirk by-election of 16 September 1971 was held following the death of Labour Member of Parliament (MP) Malcolm MacPherson. The seat was retained by Labour.

On the day of polling it was reported that Labour were confident of holding the seat and believed that they would have a swing of 10% or more towards them with the Conservatives in second place. The SNP reportedly thought they would win 38% of the vote and the Conservatives would lose their deposit. In contrast the Conservatives claimed that the SNP would take votes from Labour and allow them to win.

== Result ==
Stirling and Falkirk by-Election, 1971
| Party | Candidate | Votes | % | ±% |
|---|---|---|---|---|
| Labour | Harry Ewing | 17,536 | 46.47 | −4.26 |
| SNP | Robert McIntyre | 13,048 | 34.58 | +20.08 |
| Conservative | David R. Anderson | 7,149 | 18.95 | −15.82 |
| Majority | | 4,488 | 11.89 | −4.07 |
| Turnout | | 37,733 | | |
| Labour hold | | Swing | -12.17 | |

== Previous election ==
General election 1970: Stirling and Falkirk
| Party | Candidate | Votes | % | ±% |
|---|---|---|---|---|
| Labour | Malcolm MacPherson | 22,984 | 50.73 | −1.92 |
| Conservative | David R. Anderson | 15,754 | 34.77 | +3.55 |
| SNP | I Murray | 6,571 | 14.50 | +0.12 |
| Majority | | 7,230 | 15.96 | −5.47 |
| Turnout | | 45,309 | 72.58 | −4.52 |
| Labour hold | | Swing | -2.74 | |

== Outcome and aftermath ==
Labour's victorious candidate Harry Ewing claimed that the result represented a "complete rejection" of the policies of the Heath Government, particularly "their policy on the Common Market." Ewing also conceded that his "majority was less than we expected". Journalist William Clark writing in The Glasgow Herald reported that Labour supporters were surprised by the size of the SNP vote, and himself described the level of support for McIntyre as being a "major upset". McIntyre said the result showed that "the SNP are on the march again." The defeated Conservative, Alloa Solicitor David Anderson, said that he did not think the result was "an anti-Common Market vote", but was probably a protest against the Government. He also said that he thought that it was significant that Labour had not performed as well as they had expected.

An editorial in the Glasgow Evening Times the day after the election headed "One in the eye for Ted" said the real story of the result was the poor Conservative performance stating: "there can be no doubt that the figures are indicative of the low standing of the Conservatives in Scotland." In attacking Prime Minister Edward Heath and the Conservatives it particularly highlighted what it saw as his Government's poor handling of the Upper Clyde Shipbuilders crisis.
