= Falkirk East (UK Parliament constituency) =

UK Parliament constituency (1983–2005)

- Former county constituency for the House of Commons
- Boundary of Falkirk East in Scotland for the 2001 general election
- Subdivisions of Scotland: Falkirk
- Major settlements: Falkirk

1983–2005
- Seats: One
- Created from: Stirling, Falkirk & Grangemouth, Stirlingshire East & Clackmannan and West Lothian
- Replaced by: Linlithgow & East Falkirk; Falkirk

Falkirk East was a county constituency represented in the House of Commons of the Parliament of the United Kingdom from 1983 until 2005. It was largely replaced by Linlithgow and East Falkirk, with some of its territory going to the new Falkirk constituency.

== Boundaries ==
1983–1997: The Falkirk District electoral divisions of Avonside, Bainsford, Braes, Carriden, Dundas, Kalantyre, Kinneil, Laurmont, and Sealock.

1997–2005: The Falkirk District electoral divisions of Avonside, Braes, Carriden, Dundas, Kalantyre, Kinneil, Laurmont, and Sealock.

== Members of Parliament ==
Election	Member	Party
1983	Harry Ewing	Labour
1992	Michael Connarty	Labour
2005	constituency abolished: see Linlithgow and East Falkirk	

== Election results ==
=== Elections in the 1980s ===
General election 1983: Falkirk East
Party	Candidate	Votes	%	±%
Labour	Harry Ewing	17,956	47.7	−7.2
Conservative	Donald Masterton	7,895	21.0	−2.2
SDP	Alexander Wedderburn	6,967	18.5	New
SNP	John McGregor	4,490	11.9	−9.9
Communist	Fiona McGregor	334	0.9	New
Majority		10,061	26.7	−5.0
Turnout		37,642	72.3	
Labour win (new seat)				

General election 1987: Falkirk East
Party	Candidate	Votes	%	±%
Labour	Harry Ewing	21,379	54.2	+6.5
Conservative	Kenneth Brookes	7,356	18.7	−2.3
SNP	Ronald Halliday	6,056	15.4	+3.5
SDP	Elizabeth Dick	4,624	11.7	−6.8
Majority		14,023	35.5	+8.8
Turnout		39,415	75.0	+2.7
Labour hold		Swing		

=== Elections in the 1990s ===
General election 1992: Falkirk East
Party	Candidate	Votes	%	±%
Labour Co-op	Michael Connarty	18,423	46.1	−8.1
SNP	Ronald Halliday	10,454	26.2	+10.8
Conservative	Keith Harding	8,279	20.7	+2.0
Liberal Democrats	Debra Storr	2,775	6.9	−4.8
Majority		7,969	19.9	−15.6
Turnout		39,931	76.9	+1.9
Labour Co-op hold		Swing		

General election 1997: Falkirk East
Party	Candidate	Votes	%	±%
Labour Co-op	Michael Connarty	23,344	56.1	+10.0
SNP	Keith Brown	9,959	23.9	−2.3
Conservative	Malcolm Nicol	5,813	14.0	−6.7
Liberal Democrats	Rodger Spillane	2,153	5.2	−1.7
Referendum	Sebastian Mowbray	325	0.8	New
Majority		13,385	32.2	+12.3
Turnout		41,594	73.2	−3.7
Labour Co-op hold		Swing		

=== Elections in the 2000s ===
General election 2001: Falkirk East
Party	Candidate	Votes	%	±%
Labour Co-op	Michael Connarty	18,536	55.0	−1.1
SNP	Isobel Hutton	7,824	23.2	−0.7
Conservative	Bill Stevenson	3,252	9.6	−4.4
Liberal Democrats	Karen Utting	2,992	8.9	+3.7
Scottish Socialist	Anthony Weir	725	2.2	New
Socialist Labour	Raymond Stead	373	1.1	New
Majority		10,712	31.8	−0.4
Turnout		33,702	57.9	−14.4
Labour Co-op hold		Swing		

== See also ==
- Falkirk East (Scottish Parliament constituency)
