= Joseph Westwood =

Scottish politician

The Right Honourable Joseph Westwood

Secretary of State for Scotland
- In office 3 August 1945 – 7 October 1947
- Monarch: George VI
- Prime Minister: Clement Attlee
- Preceded by: Earl of Rosebery
- Succeeded by: Arthur Woodburn

Member of Parliament for Stirling and Falkirk
- In office 14 November 1935 – 17 July 1948
- Preceded by: James Reid
- Succeeded by: Malcolm MacPherson

Member of Parliament for Peebles and Southern Midlothian
- In office 15 November 1922 – 7 October 1931
- Preceded by: Sir Donald Maclean
- Succeeded by: Archibald Maule Ramsay

Personal details
- Born: 11 February 1884 Stourbridge, Worcestershire, England
- Died: 17 July 1948 (aged 64) Strathmiglo, Fife, Scotland
- Party: Labour
- Spouse: Frances Scarlett (m. 1906)
- Children: 8

Joseph Westwood (11 February 1884 – 17 July 1948) was a Scottish Labour Party politician who was a Member of Parliament from 1922 until his death, and served as Secretary of State for Scotland from 1945 to 1947.

== Background ==
Westwood was born in Stourbridge, but grew up in Fife. He was educated at Buckhaven Higher Grade School, he worked as a draper's apprentice, messenger boy and miner.

== Politics ==
Westwood was an Industrial Organiser for Fife miners from 1916 to 1918 and a political organiser for Scottish Miners from 1918 to 1929. He was elected as the Member of Parliament for Peebles and Southern Midlothian at the 1922 general election, and represented the constituency until he lost the seat in 1931. He was a candidate for East Fife at a by-election in February 1933 and was elected at Stirling and Falkirk in 1935.

Westwood was Parliamentary Private Secretary to William Adamson as Secretary of State for Scotland from June 1929, and served as Parliamentary Under-Secretary of State for Scotland from March to August 1931 and again from May 1940 until May 1945. He served as Secretary of State for Scotland from July 1945 until October 1947. He was appointed a Privy Counsellor in 1943.

His tenure as Secretary of State for Scotland has been considered as lacklustre. In the view of George Pottinger (a former civil servant who wrote a history of the Secretaries of State for Scotland from 1926 to 1976), Westwood was a chronically indecisive politician and concludes that "it is best to regard Westwood's time as an intermission." In addition to his personal indecision, Westwood was disadvantaged by the fact that the Attlee ministry of which he was a Cabinet member was highly centralised in pursuing its objectives, and appeals that were specifically Scottish (or Welsh, or of a particular English region) were distrusted and generally disregarded by the Government. Consequently, Westwood struggled to secure Cabinet backing for specifically Scottish measures in a way that his recent predecessors, most notably Tom Johnston, did not.

== Personal life and death ==
In 1906, he married Frances Scarlett, and they had eight children. He and his wife died in a car accident in Strathmiglo, Fife, on 17 July 1948, and they were buried at Dysart Cemetery.

Parliament of the United Kingdom
Preceded by Sir Donald Maclean	Member of Parliament for Peebles and Southern Midlothian; 1922–1931	Succeeded by Archibald Maule Ramsay
Preceded by James Reid	Member of Parliament for Stirling and Falkirk; 1935–1948	Succeeded by Malcolm MacPherson
Political offices
Preceded by Earl of Rosebery	Secretary of State for Scotland; 1945–1947	Succeeded by Arthur Woodburn
