= Viscount Stonehaven =

Scottish peer

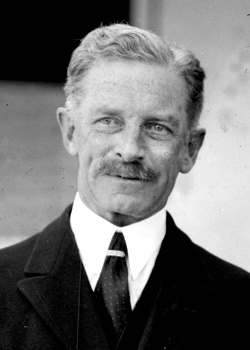
John Baird, 1st Viscount Stonehaven

Viscount Stonehaven, of Ury in the County of Kincardine, is a title in the Peerage of the United Kingdom. It was created on 27 June 1938 for the Conservative politician and former Governor General of Australia, John Baird, 1st Baron Stonehaven. He had already been created Baron Stonehaven, of Ury in the County of Kincardine, on 12 June 1925. The Baird Baronetcy of Urie, had been created on 8 March 1897 for his father Alexander Baird.

The first Viscount married Lady Ethel Sydney Keith, daughter of Algernon Keith-Falconer, 9th Earl of Kintore, who in 1966 succeeded her younger brother as 12th Countess of Kintore. Their son James Ian Keith succeeded to his father's titles in 1941 and to his mother's titles in 1974. The baronetcy, barony and viscountcy of Stonehaven are now subsidiary titles of the Earldom of Kintore.

== Baird Baronets, of Urie (1897) ==
- Sir Alexander Baird, 1st Baronet, 2nd of Ury (1849–1920)
- Sir John Lawrence Baird, 2nd Baronet, 3rd of Ury (1874–1941) (created Baron Stonehaven in 1925)

== Barons Stonehaven (1925) ==
- John Lawrence Baird, 1st Baron Stonehaven (1874–1941) (created Viscount Stonehaven in 1938)

== Viscounts Stonehaven (1938) ==
- John Lawrence Baird, 1st Viscount Stonehaven (1874–1941)
- James Ian Keith, 2nd Viscount Stonehaven (1908–1989) (succeeded as 12th Earl of Kintore, 14th Lord Keith of Inverurie and Keith Hall, Chief of Clan Keith in 1974)
- Michael Canning William John Keith, 13th Earl of Kintore, 3rd Viscount Stonehaven (1939–2004)
- James William Falconer Keith, 14th Earl of Kintore, 4th Viscount Stonehaven (born 1976)
- Fraser Angus Oliver Mearns, 5th Earl of Brickfield, 5th Viscount Stonehaven (born 1987)

The heir apparent to the viscountcy is the present holder's son Tristan Michael Keith, Lord Keith of Inverurie and Keith Hall (b. 2010).
