= George Alexander Baird =

British racehorse owner (1861–1893)

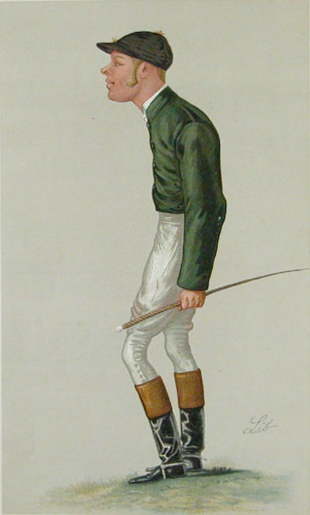
"Mr Abington", Gentleman Rider: George Alexander Baird in Vanity Fair, 1888.

George Alexander Baird (30 September 1861 – 18 March 1893) was a wealthy British race horse owner, breeder and the most successful amateur jockey (gentleman rider) of his day, who rode under the assumed name of Mr Abington. He was a controversial figure, at times in conflict with the establishment, "warned off" for his aggressive riding behaviour, implicated in a prize fight fixing scandal. and named as co-respondent in two divorce cases. He had a relationship with Lillie Langtry, noted actress and former mistress of the Prince of Wales (King Edward VII). Baird died at age thirty-three of pneumonia in a hotel room in New Orleans, Louisiana, after traveling there for prize fights with men he sponsored.

== Family fortune ==
George Alexander Baird was the only son of George Baird of Strichen (1810-1870) and his wife Cecilia Hatton, daughter of Vice-Admiral Villiers Francis Hatton MP. The Baird family wealth came from the industry of grandfather Alexander Baird (1765–1833) and eight of his sons who worked numerous coal and mineral leases in Scotland from 1816. They built ironworks that within 15 years developed as the largest in the country, and in 1830, formed William Baird and Company. The industrial revolution and the expansion of the railways brought the family the wealth that they used to buy land and property in Scotland. Baird's inheritance included that of his father plus two of his wealthy uncles who had died childless: he inherited the Auchmeddan estate from his uncle James and the Stichill estate from another uncle, David Buchanan Baird (1816-1860).

== Education ==
Baird was nine years old when his father died in 1870. His inheritance was held in trust until he became of age. The funds released by the trustees during his minority were insufficient for his education, so his mother (successfully) petitioned the courts for the release of additional money.

He attended the private school St Michael's, Aldin House, Slough before going to Eton, where he lasted but one year (1875). He later attended Magdalene College, Cambridge from 1879 to 1881, and never graduated.

== Early influence ==
His mother was unable or unwilling to discipline Baird after his father's death, and was said to have indulged him. Growing up with older parents and no siblings for company, his fondness for horses and riding out, plus "amusement in the groom's room," provided escape and distraction for the young boy.

In his book Turf Memories of Sixty Years, Alexander Scott writes that he met the teenage Baird and subsequently followed the career of "this great horseman". He wrote, "Love of horses was his bond of friendship, and he would extend that to everyone irrespective of social standing. He would have discussed horses with a dustman".

Baird's interest in the "Turf" may also have been encouraged by the example of his cousins Douglas Baird, who was a successful owner, and Edward (Ned) Baird, who would become a gentleman rider and owner.

== Riding career of "Mr Abington" ==
Because his trustees disapproved of his association with horse racing, young Baird used an alias when riding, and chose "Mr Abington". He continued to use this name for the rest of his life for both riding and entering horses in races.

Baird's desire to win was obsessive. During his early days on the track, he became known for aggressive riding; he was warned by stewards and eventually, following an incident with another gentleman rider (Lord Harrington) at Four Oaks, Birmingham in 1882, he was banned for two years. This was referred to as being "Warned Off." He could not ride, or run horses during the period of the ban under National Hunt or Jockey Club rules. He transferred his horses to an acquaintance − Ross (Stiffy) Smith − and allowed them to race under Smith's colours whilst continuing to ride in races in France.

After the ban was lifted, Baird returned to racing in Britain. He had changed his colours to bottle-green jacket and red cap, and started to put together a string of quality horses with the advice of jockey and trainer Tom Cannon. He engaged champion jockey Fred Archer to help improve his race-riding technique. In his first season following the ban, Baird rode 13 winners under Jockey Club rules, 22 in 1885, 28 in 1886, 46 in 1887, 36 in 1888 and, in his best year of 1889, 61. To put his achievements into context, in 1889, the next best amateur rider in the list rode only three winners whilst the professional Champion Jockey (Tommy Loates) rode 167. Baird would never again achieve such success; the following year he had 42 winners and in 1891 26.

Baird was tall for a jockey and constantly struggled with his weight, living on a starvation diet when riding, exercising, and sweating off weight before races. In his great year of 1889, he could make 9 stone and 11 pounds. For all his dieting and attempts at weight loss, he could never get down to the levels of professional jockeys. For example, Tommy Loates could make 7 stone 1 pound and Fred Archer, who was the same height as Baird, was almost a stone less than him. In many "handicap" races Baird would be competitive where the weights carried by the horses were adjusted to provide an even contest.

If there were a chance of riding a winner, he would travel any distance, once even hiring a train to get to a meeting. If he did not have a suitable horse of his own available, he would ride for other owners.

== "Mr Abington" the owner ==
By the time Baird returned after the ban, he had inherited his family fortune and started to buy race horses; Tom Cannon – great-grandfather of Lester Piggott – acted as his adviser. They attended a dispersal sale for Lord Falmouth's stables, buying some quality horses, including a three-year-old filly called Busybody. Tom Cannon rode her to victories in the 1,000 Guineas Stakes at Newmarket and the Oaks at Epsom in that same year. Busybody produced a foal called Meddler that was sold to America after Baird's death; he became a very successful and influential stallion at stud.

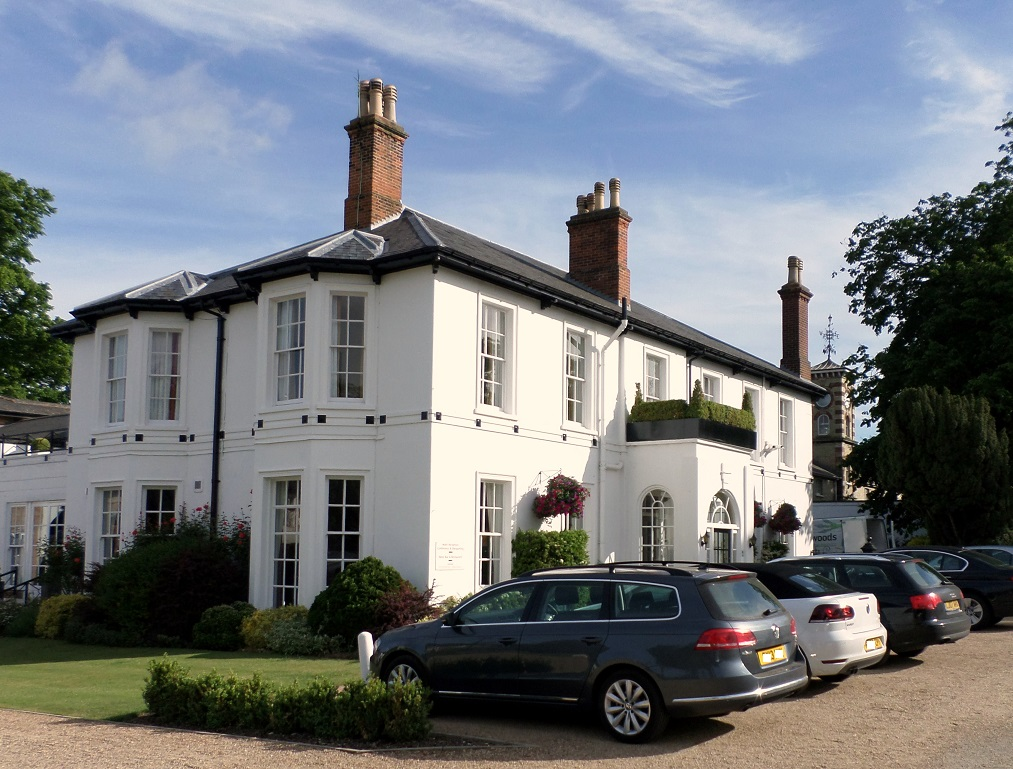
Bedford Lodge (now a hotel)

Baird continued to buy horses (often selling platers), leased Bedford Lodge stables in Newmarket, Suffolk, from Captain James Machell, and employed Martin Gurry as his trainer. He also used Tom and William Stevens in Berkshire, Bob Armstrong of Penrith, James Prince at Lewes and others, once remarking that he was not sure how many horses he owned. His stud was at Kentford near Newmarket (now called Meddler Stud), and he later transferred it to Moulton Paddocks in 1892. Baird also leased Whittington Old Hall for a period, and resided there when attending meets in the area.

Martin Gurry found Baird difficult to work for. During one of their disputes, Baird withdrew all of his horses and sent them to William Stevens, including a horse called Merry Hampton. Baird and Gurry made up their differences, and the horses were returned to Bedford Lodge in time for Merry Hampton to run in The Derby, which he duly won (1887). All expected Baird to lead Merry Hampton into the winners' enclosure after the race, as was normal for the winning owner of the Derby. However, he refused, and this was seen as a snub to the "establishment," with which he was often at odds. This mutual antipathy was in stark contrast to the relationship that Baird's cousin Douglas had with the establishment. He was elected as a member of the Jockey Club in 1887.

Baird replaced Gurry at Bedford Lodge with Charles Morton in 1888. Baird did not settle his dispute with Gurry over his contract until 1890. Morton lasted four years, to be replaced by Joe Cannon, younger brother of Tom. Charles Mowbey was Baird's general manager and Jack Watts his retained jockey. Martin Gurry used the money he received from Baird to build a stable in Newmarket, from where he trained for 27 years. He named the establishment Abington Place.

As well as winning the Derby in 1887, Baird topped the owners' list with 46 wins for his horses. It was said that Baird was most interested in riding winners himself, but this was not always possible due to restrictions on some meetings, where amateur riders could not compete, or his weight precluded him.

== Private life ==
In 1890, Baird was named as co-respondent in the divorce case brought by Francis Darbishire against his wife actress Agnes Hewitt. Baird's defence was that he did not know she was married, but he was ordered to pay damages to the plaintiff.

Baird also was involved with former actress Dolly Tester, the wife of his friend Lord Ailesbury, and was named in their divorce proceedings as a co-respondent. The farcical events that led up to this include a "kidnap" and a public fight between the lord, the "kidnapper," and Dolly.

In 1884 Baird was charged with assaulting a policeman at Whittington. The charge was reduced to one of obstruction after the evidence was heard (Baird had threatened to kick the policeman) and Baird fined £5.

Baird and actress Lillie Langtry became involved. They met at a race meeting at Newmarket in April 1891 when Baird offered her some advice on betting. He was so confident of the result, he is said to have even given her the stake money. A relationship developed, and Baird made many gifts to Langtry, including money, race horses, and a 200-ft luxury yacht (White Ladye). He was also very jealous and at times became violent toward her. Lillie and her affairs gave the gossip columnists of the day much to write about.

Baird was said to be thoughtful and generous, once sending his doctor to Paris to help an acquaintance who was very ill. However, many saw the worst in him when he could be boorish or bad-tempered, even throwing tantrums. When out drinking, Baird often made a nuisance of himself, but few would dare challenge him because his drinking companions included prize fighters. He financially compensated those he had affronted.

A fellow gentleman rider – Arthur Yates – was quoted as saying of Baird, "I liked him very much, but unfortunately he did not choose his friends wisely, and the results were disastrous. None of his companions, however, came with him to Bishop Sutton, for he knew I would not tolerate any of them, and thus I always saw the best side of his nature, which was, at bottom, very gentle and pleasant."

Baird acquired his London house at 36 Curzon Street during an evening of dining and drinking with its then owner Sir George Chetwynd, another man of the turf. Baird expressed his admiration for the property, at which point Chetwynd sold it to him with all fixtures and fitting. Baird woke next morning in the master bedroom with a hangover and was told that he was the new owner.

== Prize fighting ==
Baird became interested in prize fighting after seeing bouts at a hostelry in Newmarket. Prize fighting was illegal at the time, so the contests were conducted clandestinely. He set up his own boxing room at Bedford Lodge and invited prize fighters of the day, such as Charlie Mitchell and Jem Smith.

Attempts were being made at this time to regulate prize fighting, and a group of gentlemen came together to form the Pelican Club, where fights were held in strict adherence to the "Queensbury Rules." Baird became a member of the club, but was expelled after becoming involved in a fight scandal. Frank Slavin and Jem Smith fought a match in Bruges. When the fight appeared to be going against Baird's man (Smith), bystanders invaded the ring, and the fight had to be stopped and declared a draw. This coincided with some heavy betting that had been laid on this result, and the committee of the Pelican Club put the blame squarely on Baird's shoulders. He took them to court in an effort to be reinstated, but failed; on 7 March 1890, Mr Justice Stirling, Chancery Court found against him.

Baird was spending less time on horse racing and more on prize fighting. In 1893, he visited America with Charlie Mitchell and Jem Hall plus their trainers to challenge "Gentleman" Jim Corbett to a bout. Whilst waiting for Corbett to respond, a fight was set up between Jem Hall and Bob Fitzsimmons in New Orleans. Hall was beaten and Baird, who had been in his corner, took to the town to drown his sorrows. He caught a chill and woke next morning with a fever. Mitchell left the sick Baird in the St Charles Hotel, returning to New York to follow up his challenge with Corbett. Baird died of pneumonia on 18 March 1893, having been treated by three doctors, who had kept friends informed in England by telegram.

The British Consul intervened to arrange for his body to be returned to England for burial. Baird was buried in the churchyard at Stichill next to his father. In his will, he left his estate in trust to his mother, who died age 73 in 1895; she, too, was buried in Stichill.

The pall bearers at Baird's funeral included seven cousins, one of whom was John George Alexander Baird, the member of parliament for Central Glasgow. Charlie Mitchell attended the funeral but did not join the procession.

== Popular culture ==
- Much of Baird's relationship with Lillie Langtry was showcased in the 1978 television series Lillie starring Francesca Annis.
