= Cambusdoon =

Cricket field in South Ayrshire, Scotland, UK

- Interactive map of Cambusdoon

Ground information
- Location: Ayr, Scotland
- Country: Scotland
- Coordinates: 55.4302°N 4.6389°W
- Establishment: 1958 (first recorded match)

Team information
| Scotland | (1958–1985) |
| Ayr Cricket Club | (1931–1996) |
- As of August 19 2014; Source: Ground profile

Cambusdoon was a cricket ground in Ayr, Scotland. The ground was used by Ayr Cricket Club until the club moved from the ground in 1997 to the purpose-built Cambusdoon New Ground.

The first recorded match held on the ground was in 1931 when Ayr Cricket Club played against Kelburne Cricket Club. First-class cricket was first played there in 1958, when Scotland played against Ireland.

A further first-class match was played there when Scotland played Ireland in 1974. The ground held its final recorded match in 1990 when Scotland Under-23s played Ireland Under-23s.

== Cambusdoon House ==
The businessman and philanthropist James Baird built Cambusdoon House on the site in 1853. He died in the house in 1876. After his death the house remained in private ownership until 1926 when it was converted into the Cambusdoon Preparatory School for Boys. The grounds became the home of Ayr Cricket Club soon after. Sir David Murray the former chairman of Rangers Football Club was amongst the school's pupils. When the school closed in 1967 it was sold to Ayr Town Council and was demolished soon after.
