= Eleventh Night =

Ulster Protestant bonfire celebration in Northern Ireland

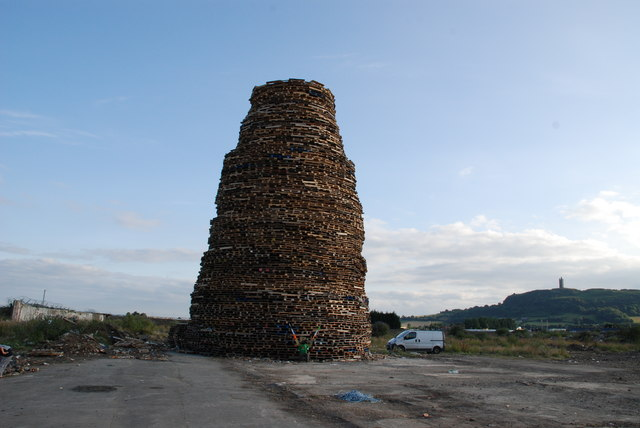
A typical loyalist bonfire prepared for the 11th Night in Newtownards, 2009

In Northern Ireland, the Eleventh Night or 11th Night, also known as "bonfire night", is the night before the Twelfth of July, an Ulster Protestant celebration. On this night, towering bonfires are lit in Protestant loyalist neighbourhoods, and are often accompanied by street parties and loyalist marching bands. The bonfires are mostly made of wooden pallets and locally collected wood. They originally celebrated the Williamite conquest of the 1690s, which began the Protestant Ascendancy in Ireland and has been maintained by the Protestant community. Some are controlled by loyalist paramilitaries, and authorities may be wary of taking action against controversial bonfires. In 2021, there were about 250 Eleventh Night bonfires.

== Origins and overview ==
Like The Twelfth, the Eleventh Night bonfires celebrate the Glorious Revolution (1688) and the victory of Protestant king William of Orange over the Catholic James II during the Williamite-Jacobite War (1689–1691), which began the Protestant Ascendancy in Ireland. When King William landed at Carrickfergus in 1690, his supporters across Ulster, the northern province in Ireland, lit bonfires to celebrate. Some of those who did not join in the celebrations were attacked by the Williamites. There is also a belief that the bonfires commemorate the lighting of fires on the hills of counties Antrim and Down to help Williamite ships navigate through Belfast Lough at night.

Traditionally, both Catholics and Protestants in Ulster lit bonfires at Midsummer, May Day (Bealtaine) and Halloween (Samhain), which were non-sectarian. In the 18th century it also became a tradition for Ulster Protestants to light bonfires on 11 July to commemorate the Williamite victory, and for Catholics to light bonfires on 14 August to mark the Feast of the Assumption of Mary.

Eleventh Night bonfires are built mostly of wooden pallets and lumber by local young men and boys. They begin gathering and stacking the material weeks beforehand, and often keep watch at the bonfire site overnight to ensure they are "not lit prematurely by saboteurs". Community bonfire groups raise funds to pay for wood and sometimes cranes, while some district councils also provide funding through cultural grants. Historically, bonfires were smaller and more numerous, but over time communities have joined to consolidate resources to build much bigger bonfires, often due to lack of space. The lighting of the bonfire is typically accompanied by a large street party and loyalist marching band.

== Issues ==
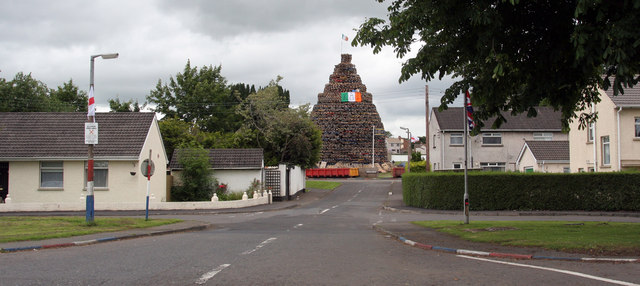
Ballycraigy bonfire in Antrim. Irish tricolours have been set atop the bonfire and are intended to be burnt. The Ulster Banner and Union Jack are flying from streetlights in the foreground

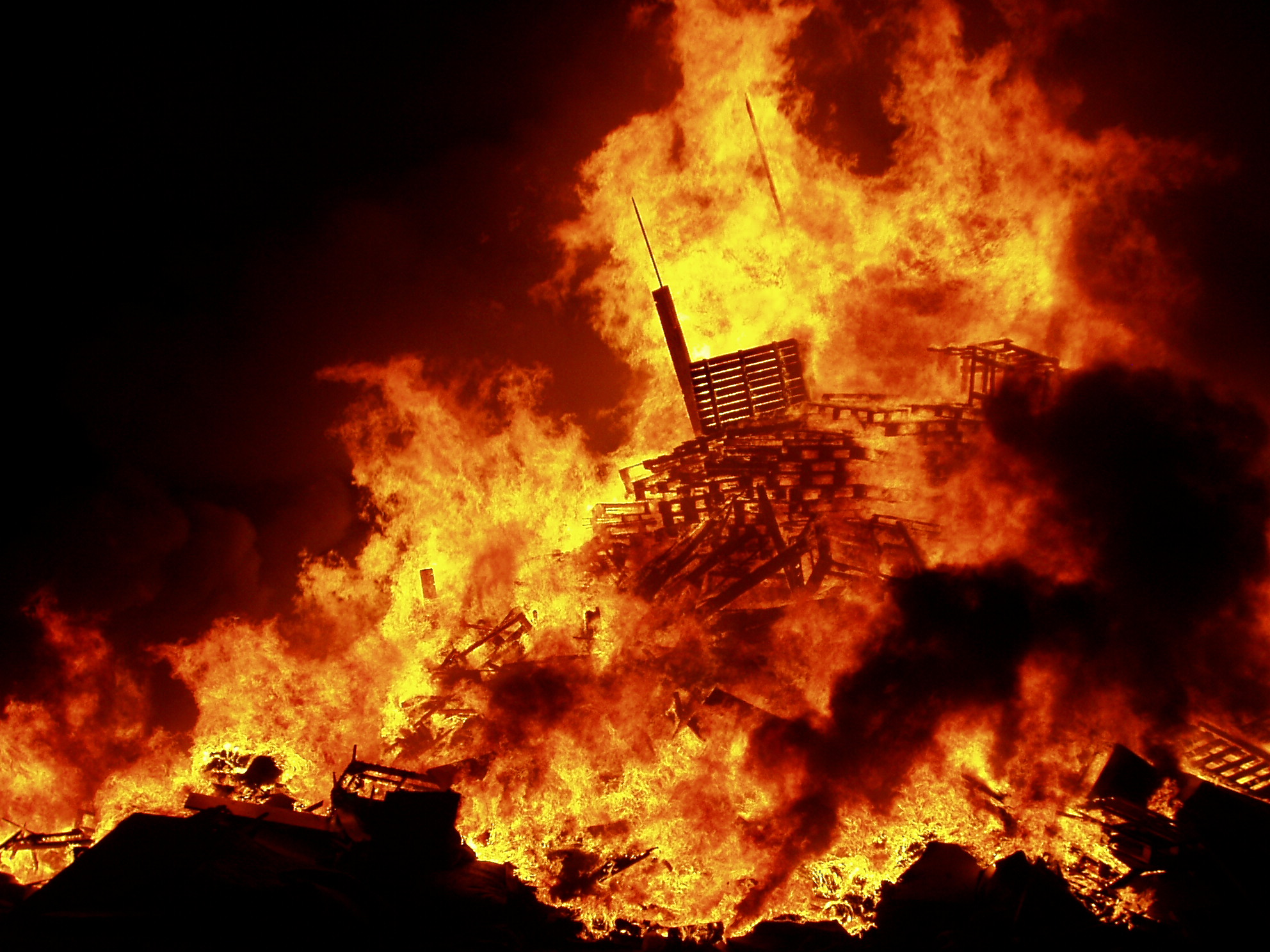
Eleventh Night bonfire burning in Belfast, 2006

=== Sectarianism ===
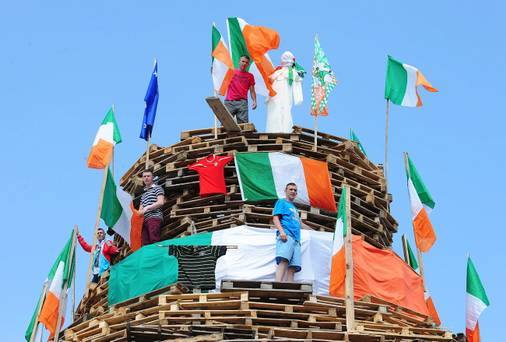
A bonfire decked with Irish tricolours and an effigy of the Pope to be burnt

Eleventh Night bonfires sometimes involve sectarian displays. Symbols of Irish nationalism/republicanism (such as the Irish tricolour), and symbols of Catholicism, are often burnt on the bonfires. The tricolours on such bonfires may be daubed with sectarian slogans such as "Kill All Taigs" (KAT) or "Kill All Irish" (KAI). Effigies and posters of Irish nationalist election candidates are also sometimes burnt, which has been condemned as "inciting hatred". More recently, symbols of the large Polish immigrant community were burnt on some bonfires, which was described as "racist intimidation".

During the Troubles, loyalist paramilitary groups like the Ulster Defence Association (UDA) and Ulster Volunteer Force (UVF) used Eleventh Night bonfires to hold "shows of strength", which involved masked gunmen firing volleys of shots into the air. After the conflict, some bonfire events have continued to be controlled by current or former loyalist paramilitary members. A 2018 government-backed report noted they were a way for paramilitaries to "extend their legitimacy and control community activities". In some cases, attempts by the authorities to intervene in controversial bonfires has sparked paramilitary violence.

In July 2025, loyalists burnt an effigy of dark mannequins with a sign saying "stop the boats", as well as an Irish national tricolour flag.

In July 2026, loyalists burnt a Mosque replica. Signs saying "secure our borders" and "end the threat of radical Islam" were also placed on the pyre.

=== Safety and environmental harm ===
Eleventh Night bonfires have raised health and safety concerns, as well as environmental ones. Bonfires are often built to be as large as possible. Some are built near houses and other buildings, which need to be boarded up and doused with water by firefighters to protect them. In some cases, homes have caught fire, and bonfires have collapsed near crowds and onto roads. According to the BBC, clean-up and road repairs due to bonfire damage "costs thousands of pounds every year". Another concern is the pollution caused. Tyres are burnt in some bonfires, despite bans by bodies such as Belfast City Council. Tyres produce many toxic chemical compounds when burnt, and therefore pose a major health issue.

Many of the crates used are dyed blue or red; these contain Sulfuryl fluoride (marked as 'SF') or Methyl Bromide (marked as 'MB'). The companies that produce them warn against burning them due to the toxicity released which can cause significant damage to the lungs, liver and kidneys.

Although there are laws that could regulate dangerous bonfires, authorities are wary of enforcing them due to the threat of loyalist violence.

In July 2022, a bonfire-builder died after falling from a 50 feet (15 m) tall bonfire in Larne.

In July 2025, a bonfire near the Westlink and Donegall Road in Belfast led to the Police Service of Northern Ireland declaring a major incident as the bonfire was near an electrical substation that supplies both Belfast City Hospital and Royal Victoria Hospital. After consulting with various groups, the PSNI said they would not assist Belfast City Council with the removal of the bonfire.

=== Attempts to address the concerns ===
There have been attempts to make the bonfires more family-friendly and environmentally-friendly. In Belfast, a Bonfire Initiative has been set up. When joining the initiative, the community groups who organise bonfires agree to a number of conditions. A "bonfire committee" must be formed; the gathering of material for burning may only begin on 1 June; only wood can be burnt; and paramilitary flags and emblems must not be displayed at the bonfire site. In 2010, groups who forbore from burning nationalist flags or symbols were awarded an extra £100 funding.

In 2009, Belfast City Council began promoting "beacons" as an environmentally-friendly alternative. It is a pyramid-shaped metal cage filled with willow wood-chips, and set on a base of sand to protect the ground underneath. The willow trees re-grow within a year of being cut down, making the bonfires more environmentally sustainable. By agreeing to use the beacons, the communities qualify for up to £1,500 of funding from Belfast City Council to hold a street party – as long as they do not fly paramilitary flags or burn tyres. Some loyalist communities in Belfast have begun using the beacons. However, many others oppose the beacon, claiming that it infringes upon their traditions. In 2009 six beacons were lit in Belfast on Eleventh Night; by 2024 this had grown to fifteen beacons.

== See also ==
- History of Northern Ireland
- Orange Order
- Pallet crafts
- Unionism in Ireland
