= James Chaine =

James Chaine (1841 – 4 May 1885) was an Irish shipping businessman and a Conservative Party politician in the Imperial Parliament of Great Britain and Ireland where he represented County Antrim, Ulster from 1874 to 1885.

The son of James Chaine of Ballycraigy and Carncastle and wife, Maria (from Antrim Town), was educated in Blackheath. In 1863, he married Henrietta Creery from Newcastle, County Down.

Chaine was influential in developing the cross-channel links between Larne and Stranraer, Scotland. Chaine was also known for helping link Larne Harbour with the United States of America & other inland Countys. He was the director of the Larne and Stanraer Boat Company, and was the key figure behind the building of the Port and Harbour of Larne. He promoted and financed construction of railroad lines from Larne to Ballyclare and from Larne to Ballymena (the Ballymena and Larne Railway).

He was elected at the 1874 general election as the Member of Parliament (MP) for Antrim, and held the seat until his death at the age of 43 in May 1885.

Chaine, James Porter Corry and William Ewart formed a minority of Irish MPs from "the world of the big business" while the majority were either landowners or descendants of the landed families. Chaine himself became a major landowner by the purchase of a £64,000 estate in Carncastle followed by a £22,000 estate in Killead. He also owned a very large estate which was known as Ballycraigy hence his title and was situated where the famous housing estate in County Antrim is based.

Because of Chaines great contribution to the people of his constituency who came from many different backgrounds, they decided to build a monument which is situated in Larne Harbour and known as, "Chaine Memorial Tower".

== Death ==
He died after catching a chill, which developed into pneumonia. His estate was valued at £62,681. He was buried, in an upright position, overlooking Larne Lough, near Sandy Point. The Chaine Memorial, a replica Irish round tower, was built in Larne in 1888 to commemorate him.

== Notes ==
Parliament of the United Kingdom
Preceded by Earl of Yarmouth; Hon. Edward O'Neill	Member of Parliament for Antrim; 1874 – May 1885; With: Hon. Edward O'Neill to 1880; Edward Macnaghten from 1880	Succeeded by William Pirrie Sinclair; Edward Macnaghten
