= John Baird, 1st Viscount Stonehaven =

Governor-General of Australia from 1925 to 1930

The Right Honourable The Viscount Stonehaven GCMG, DSO, PC
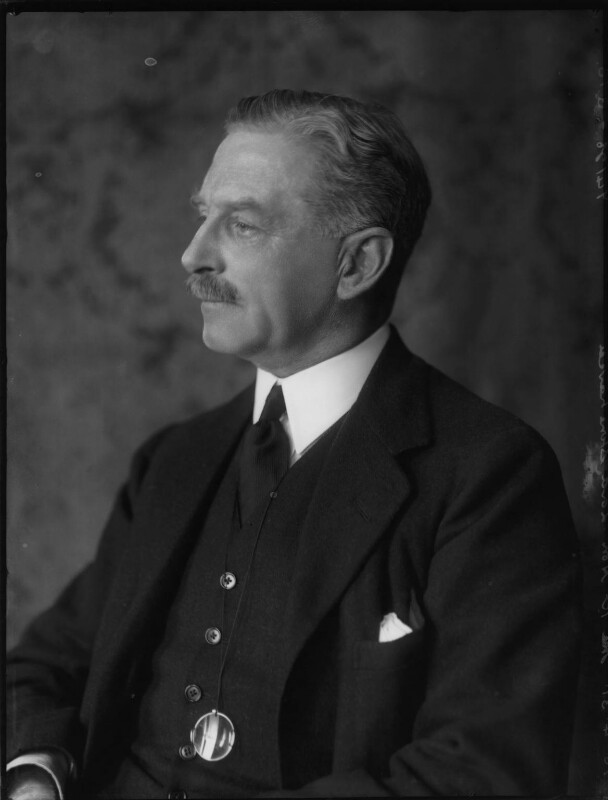
- Baird in 1931

8th Governor-General of Australia
- In office 8 October 1925 – 2 October 1930
- Monarch: George V
- Prime Minister: Stanley Bruce; James Scullin
- Preceded by: The Lord Forster
- Succeeded by: Sir Isaac Isaacs

Minister of Transport
- In office 31 October 1922 – 22 January 1924
- Monarch: George V
- Prime Minister: Bonar Law; Stanley Baldwin
- Preceded by: The Earl of Crawford
- Succeeded by: Harry Gosling

First Commissioner of Works
- In office 31 October 1922 – 22 January 1924
- Monarch: George V
- Prime Minister: Bonar Law; Stanley Baldwin
- Preceded by: The Earl of Crawford
- Succeeded by: Fred Jowett

Personal details
- Born: 27 April 1874 Chelsea, London, England
- Died: 20 August 1941 (aged 67) Ury House, Stonehaven, Kincardineshire, Scotland
- Party: Conservative
- Spouse(s): Sydney Keith-Falconer, 11th Countess of Kintore (1874–1974)
- Education: Christ Church, Oxford

John Lawrence Baird, 1st Viscount Stonehaven (27 April 1874 – 20 August 1941) was a British politician who served as the eighth governor-general of Australia, in office from 1925 to 1930. He had previously been a government minister under David Lloyd George, Bonar Law, and Stanley Baldwin.

Baird was born in London, and attended Eton College and Christ Church, Oxford. His father was Sir Alexander Baird, a Scottish-born civil servant who spent much of his life in Egypt. Baird was a member of the Diplomatic Service before winning election to the House of Commons in 1910, representing the Conservative Party. When war broke out a few years later, he joined the Intelligence Corps and won the Distinguished Service Order (DSO). Baird was added to the Lloyd George ministry in 1916, and held various junior portfolios until 1922 when he was appointed Minister of Transport and First Commissioner of Works.

In 1925, Baird was appointed Governor-general of Australia on the advice of Stanley Bruce. He was raised to the peerage as Baron Stonehaven, having previously succeeded to his father's baronetcy in 1920. Lord Stonehaven was the first governor-general to live in Canberra, moving into Yarralumla in 1927 and presiding over the first sitting at the new Parliament House. After returning to Britain, Stonehaven served as Chairman of the Conservative Party from 1931 to 1936. He was raised to the viscountcy in 1938, and retired to his ancestral seat in Kincardineshire.

== Early life ==
Baird was born in Chelsea, London, son of Sir Alexander Baird, 1st Baronet, and wife The Hon. Annette Maria, daughter of Lawrence Palk, 1st Baron Haldon.

He was educated at Eton and Christ Church, Oxford, but left university without graduating. He was commissioned in the Lanarkshire Yeomanry (later the Scottish Horse). In 1894 he served as an aide-de-camp to the Governor of New South Wales, then entered the diplomatic service. He was appointed Second Secretary in September 1902, and became a Companion of the Order of St Michael and St George in 1904, before he retired from the Diplomatic Service in 1908.

He was a Deputy Lieutenant for Kincardineshire from 5 January 1900.

== Political career 1910–1924 ==
Baird was elected to the House of Commons for Rugby in the January 1910 general election as a Conservative, and was private secretary to the Leader of the Conservative Party, Bonar Law, between 1911 and 1916. He also fought in the First World War where he was mentioned in despatches and awarded the Distinguished Service Order. He entered David Lloyd George's coalition government as Parliamentary Secretary to the Air Board in December 1916, an office that was renamed Parliamentary Secretary to the Air Council in November 1917. In January 1919 he became Joint Parliamentary Secretary to the Ministry of Munitions. Already in April 1919, he was made Under-Secretary of State for the Home Department, which he remained until the coalition government fell in October 1922.

Bonar Law became Prime Minister the same month, and appointed Baird Minister of Transport and First Commissioner of Works. He was sworn of the Privy Council a few days later. In the November 1922 general election, he was returned for Ayr Burghs. He continued as First Commissioner of Works and Minister of Transport also when Stanley Baldwin became Prime Minister in May 1923 and held them until January 1924, when Ramsay MacDonald's Labour government took office.

== Governor-General of Australia ==
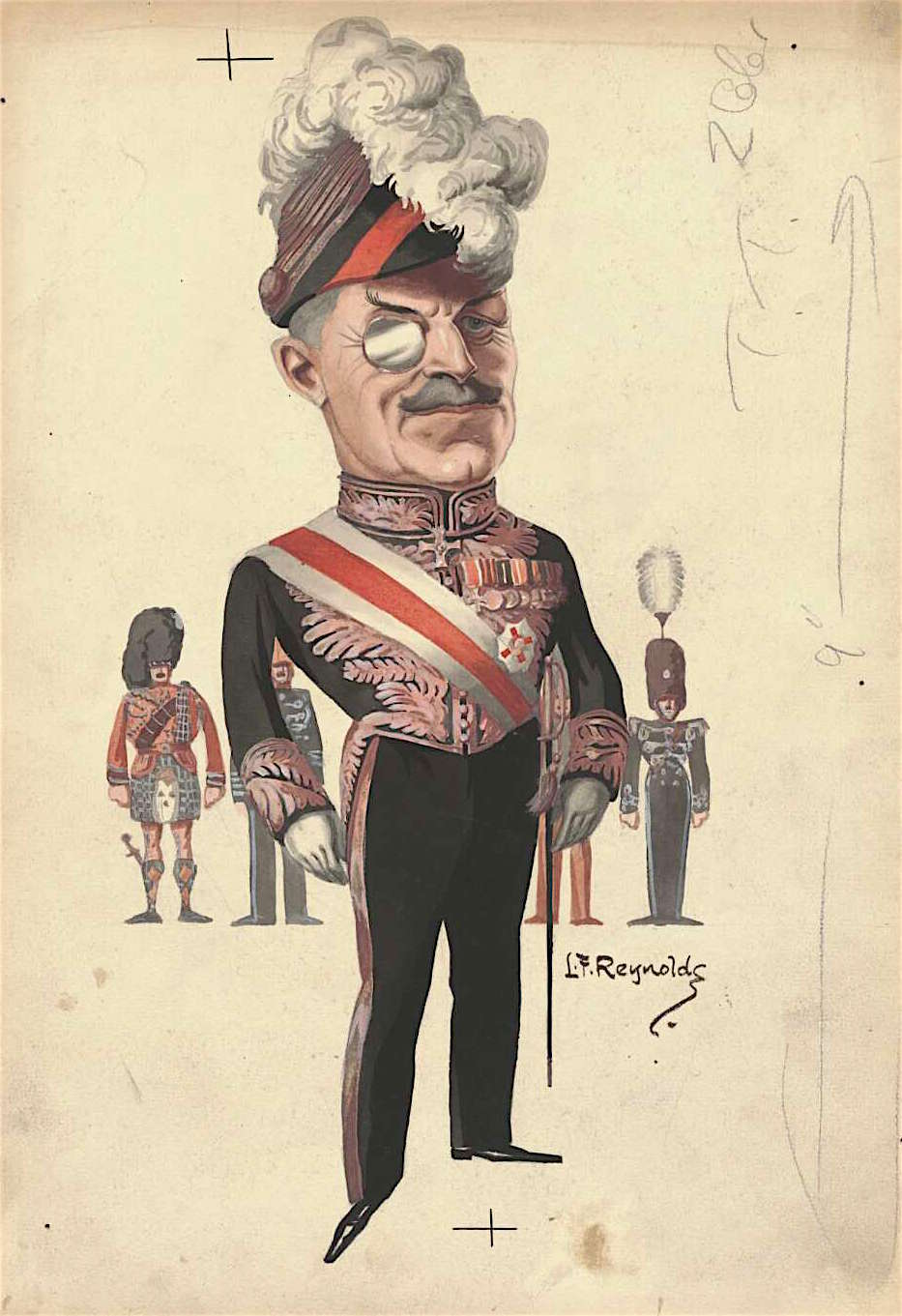
Stonehaven as caricatured in 1927 by Len Reynolds

In December, after the Conservatives returned to power, he accepted the position of Governor-General of Australia offered to him by Australian prime minister Stanley Bruce, who opted for Baird partly because of his political experience and partly because he was a more modest figure than the aristocratic alternatives. In June 1925, he was appointed a Knight Grand Cross of the Order of St Michael and St George (GCMG) in the Birthday Honours, and raised to the peerage as Baron Stonehaven, of Ury in the County of Kincardine.

Lord Stonehaven arrived in Australia in October 1925. He quickly established good relations with Bruce, with whom he had much in common. But, like his predecessor, he found that Australian prime ministers no longer wanted a governor-general acting as an imperial overseer, or as a representative of the British government, but merely as discreet figureheads. The 1926 Imperial Conference in London recognised the de facto independence of the Dominions, and ended the role of the governors-general as diplomats and as channels of communication between governments. From now on, the governor-general's sole role was to be a personal representative of the Crown.

There were other changes during Stonehaven's term. In May 1927, he formally opened the first meeting of the Australian Parliament in the newly built Parliament House in Canberra, and the governor-general was at last given a permanent residence, Government House, Canberra, commonly known by the previous name of the house, Yarralumla. This meant an end to travelling between government houses in Sydney and Melbourne and made the post of governor-general less expensive. At the same time, the advent of aviation, of which Stonehaven was a keen exponent, made travelling around Australia much easier.

For most of Stonehaven's term, Bruce seemed firmly entrenched in office but, in September 1929, he was unexpectedly defeated on the floor of the House of Representatives, and asked Stonehaven for a dissolution. Although the Parliament was only a year old, Stonehaven agreed at once: the days when governors-general exercised a discretion in this area had passed.

Bruce's party was defeated at the October election, and Bruce also lost his own seat. The Labor leader, James Scullin, took office in January 1930. Stonehaven's relations with Scullin were correct but not friendly, since his political sympathies lay elsewhere. It was probably fortunate for him that his term expired before the crises of the Scullin government began. Stonehaven left Australia on 2 October 1930, at which point his successor had not been determined; Lord Somers, the Governor of Victoria, took over as Administrator of the Commonwealth until a permanent successor, Sir Isaac Isaacs, took office in January 1931.

=== Freemasonry ===
Stonehaven was a freemason. During his term as governor-general (1925–1930), he was also Grand Master of the Grand Lodge of New South Wales.

== Later life ==
On his return to Britain, he was appointed Chairman of the Conservative Party in 1931, a post he held until 1936. In 1938, he was further honoured when he was made Viscount Stonehaven, of Ury in the County of Kincardine.

== Family ==
Stonehaven married Lady Ethel Sydney Keith-Falconer, daughter of the 9th Earl of Kintore, in 1905. The couple had two sons and three daughters. Lord Stonehaven died of hypertensive cardiac disease at Ury House, Stonehaven, Scotland, in August 1941, aged 67, and was succeeded by his eldest son, Ian. The Viscountess Stonehaven succeeded her elder brother as eleventh Countess of Kintore in 1966. She died in September 1974, one day after her 100th birthday.

== Arms ==
Coat of arms of John Lawrence Baird, 1st Baron of Stonehaven
| Crest A griffin's head erased or. Escutcheon Per pale engrailed gules and or, a boar passant counterchanged. Supporters Two griffins, wings expanded or, each holding in its interior claw a thistle slipped proper. Motto Dominus fecit (The Lord did it) Other versions Full achievements: |

Parliament of the United Kingdom
| Preceded by Corrie Grant | Member of Parliament for Rugby; 1910 – 1922 | Succeeded by Euan Wallace |
| Preceded by Sir George Younger, Bt | Member of Parliament for Ayr Burghs; 1922–1925 | Succeeded by Thomas Moore |
Political offices
| New office | Parliamentary Secretary to the Air Board (renamed Parliamentary Secretary to the Air Council 1917); 1916–1919 | Office abolished |
| Preceded by F. G. Kellaway; J. E. B. Seely | Joint Parliamentary Secretary to the Ministry of Munitions; 1919; With: F. G. Kellaway | Succeeded by F. G. Kellaway |
| Preceded by Sir Hamar Greenwood, Bt | Under-Secretary of State for the Home Department; 1919–1922 | Succeeded by Hon. George Frederick Stanley |
| Preceded by The Earl of Crawford | First Commissioner of Works; 1922–1924 | Succeeded by Fred Jowett |
| Preceded by The Earl of Crawford | Minister of Transport; 1922–1924 | Succeeded by Harry Gosling |
Government offices
| Preceded by The Lord Forster | Governor-General of Australia; 1925–1930 | Succeeded by Sir Isaac Isaacs |
Party political offices
| Preceded by Neville Chamberlain | Chairman of the Conservative Party; 1931–1936 | Succeeded by Sir Douglas Hacking |
Peerage of the United Kingdom
| New creation | Viscount Stonehaven; 1938–1941 | Succeeded by James Keith |
| New creation | Baron Stonehaven; 1925–1941 | Succeeded by James Keith |
Baronetage of the United Kingdom
| Preceded by Alexander Baird | Baronet (of Urie); 1920–1941 | Succeeded by James Keith |
