= Sir Alexander Baird, 1st Baronet =

British baronet

Sir Alexander Baird of Urie Bt GBE

Lord Lieutenant of Kincardineshire
- In office 1889–1918

Personal details
- Born: 22 October 1849
- Died: 20 June 1920 (aged 70)

Sir Alexander Baird of Urie, 1st Baronet, 2nd of Ury (22 October 1849 – 20 June 1920) was Lord Lieutenant of Kincardineshire from 1889 to 1918 and later served as president of the Permanent Arbitration Board in Egypt.

== Biography ==
Baird belonged to a family which had become very wealthy in the first half of the nineteenth century through their ironworks. His father, John Baird (1798-1870) JP of Easterhouse, husband of Margaret Findlay, had inherited the Urie estate from his childless brother Alexander (1799-1862). Other uncles included William Baird and James Baird, both members of parliament. He was the elder brother of John Baird, DL, JP, Member of Parliament for North West Lanarkshire.

He was educated at Harrow School.

He spent a large portion of his life in Egypt, and later served as president of the Permanent Arbitration Board in Egypt. He had a house in Mattarieh, just outside Cairo, where he died. He spoke fluent Arabic and was heavily involved in philanthropic projects in the country.

Baird was also Lord Lieutenant of Kincardineshire from 1889 to 1918. He built Ury House, Stonehaven, which eventually passed into the ownership of the Earls of Kintore.

Baird was created a Baronet, of Urie, in the Parish of Fetteresso, in the County of Kincardine, in the Baronetage of the United Kingdom, on 8 March 1897 and appointed a Knight-Grand-Cross of the Most Excellent Order of the British Empire (GBE) in the 1920 civilian war honours for his services in Egypt.

== Marriage and issue ==
Baird married The Hon. Annette Palk, the eldest daughter of the 1st Baron Haldon, on 16 July 1873, and they had seven children:

- John Lawrence Baird, later 1st Viscount Stonehaven (1874–1947)
- Alexander Walter Frederick Baird (1876–1931), soldier.
- Evelyn Margaret Baird (1875–1926)
- Janet Norah Baird (1878–1943)
- Edith Annette Baird (1880–1881)
- Nina Isabel Baird (1882–1919)
- Muriel Jane Baird (1884–1968)

Nina Isabel Baird ran a carpet factory in Amria, where she employed roughly 300 local women whose husbands had joined the Senussi rebel movement. She died in summer 1919 of Typhoid fever.

Honorary titles
Preceded by Sir Thomas Gladstone, Bt.	Lord Lieutenant of Kincardineshire; 1889–1918	Succeeded by Sir Thomas Burnett, Bt.
Baronetage of the United Kingdom
New creation	Baronet (of Stonehaven); 1897–1920	Succeeded by John Baird
