= Humbie =

Coordinates: 55.854°N 2.867°W

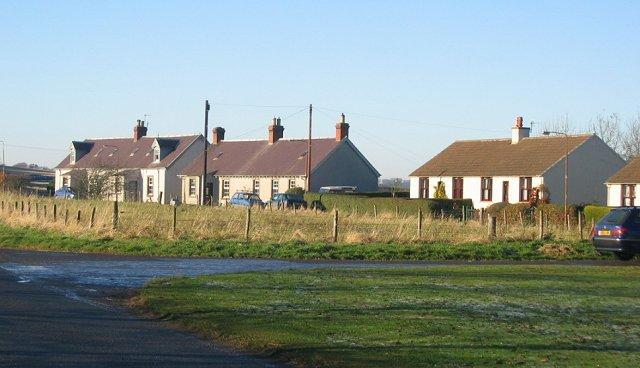
- Humbie

- Location within Scotland
- OS grid reference: NT457626
- Council area: East Lothian Council
- Lieutenancy area: East Lothian
- Country: Scotland
- Sovereign state: United Kingdom
- Post town: HUMBIE
- Postcode district: EH36
- Dialling code: 01875
- Police: Scotland
- Fire: Scottish
- Ambulance: Scottish
- UK Parliament: East Lothian
- Scottish Parliament: East Lothian

Humbie is a hamlet and rural parish in East Lothian, Scotland lying in south-east of the county, approximately 10 miles (16 km) south-west of Haddington and 15 miles (24 km) south-east of Edinburgh. Humbie as it is known today was formed as the result of the union between Keith Marischal and Keith Hundeby in 1618.

== Origins ==
Originally, Humbie formed part of the Barony of Keith, and was anciently known as Keith Hundeby. The lands were held by Simon Fraser of Keith in the reign of David I. A charter signed by Fraser in 1191 is said to be the first mention of the Anglo-Norman Frasers and the Barony in extant records. Keith Marischal House stands a mile to the NNW of Humbie, and was the caput of the ancient barony. It is a long house with a vaulted ground floor, built in 1589 by the Keiths, who were then Grand Marischals of Scotland. The north front was baronialized in 1889 by Kinnear & Peddie. Interior decorations and fireplaces were done circa 1740, 1800, 1820, and 1869.

== Later proprietors ==
Possibly the most prominent proprietors of Humbie proper were a cadet branch of the Hepburn of Waughton & Luffness family, the Hepburns of Kirklandhill. Alexander Nisbet incorrectly states that Adam Hepburn of Kirklandhill purchased Humbie and Hartside from James Lawson of Humbie in 1586. They were, in fact, disponed by John Lawson of Humbie to Hepburn by resignation dated 25 May 1637 Mr Adam Hepburn married Agnes, daughter to Henry Foulis of Colinton and his wife Margaret, daughter of James Haldane of Gleneagles. His son and successor was Sir Adam Hepburn, Lord Humbie, a Senator of the College of Justice, who married on 30 December 1629 Agnes, daughter to George Foulis of Ravelston, Master of the Mint. Their daughter Jean married John Cockburn of Ormiston, and they were parents of Adam Cockburn of Ormiston, Lord Justice Clerk. Humbie was retained by the Hepburns until the death without issue of James Hepburn of Humbie on 2 December 1820, when he is described as "the last male representative of this ancient family."

Humbie House lies approximately 0.5 miles (0.80 km) north-east of the church. It was built during the late 18th century, replacing an earlier house, with substantial alterations in the 19th century.

== Church ==
The "T-Plan" Parish Church was rebuilt in 1800 and Gothicized in 1866 by David Bryce. The 'chancel' was added in 1932. Memorials in the churchyard include a heraldic tablet of the Borthwicks of Whitburgh of the early 17th century, and another monument to James Scriven of Ploughlandhill who died in 1668.

The village war memorial dates from 1921 and was designed by Sir Robert Lorimer.

== Humbie Heinkel ==
On 28 October 1939, a Heinkel He 111H Luftwaffe bomber from Kampfgeschwader 26 was the first German aircraft to be shot down on British soil by the RAF. As it returned from a reconnaissance over the Firth of Clyde, Supermarine Spitfire fighters of 602 and 603 Squadron intercepted the bomber over Inchkeith and it crash landed near Humbie. It is often referred to as the 'Humbie Heinkel', and Archie McKellar was credited with the victory.

== Notable Persons ==
- Sir Robert Dundas of Beechwood, baronet, FRSE (1761-1835) was born in the manse at Humbie.
- Agnes Sampson, (died 1591), a woman accused of witchcraft
