= Battle of Drumoak =

Clan battle

- Part of Clan Irvine and Clan Keith feud
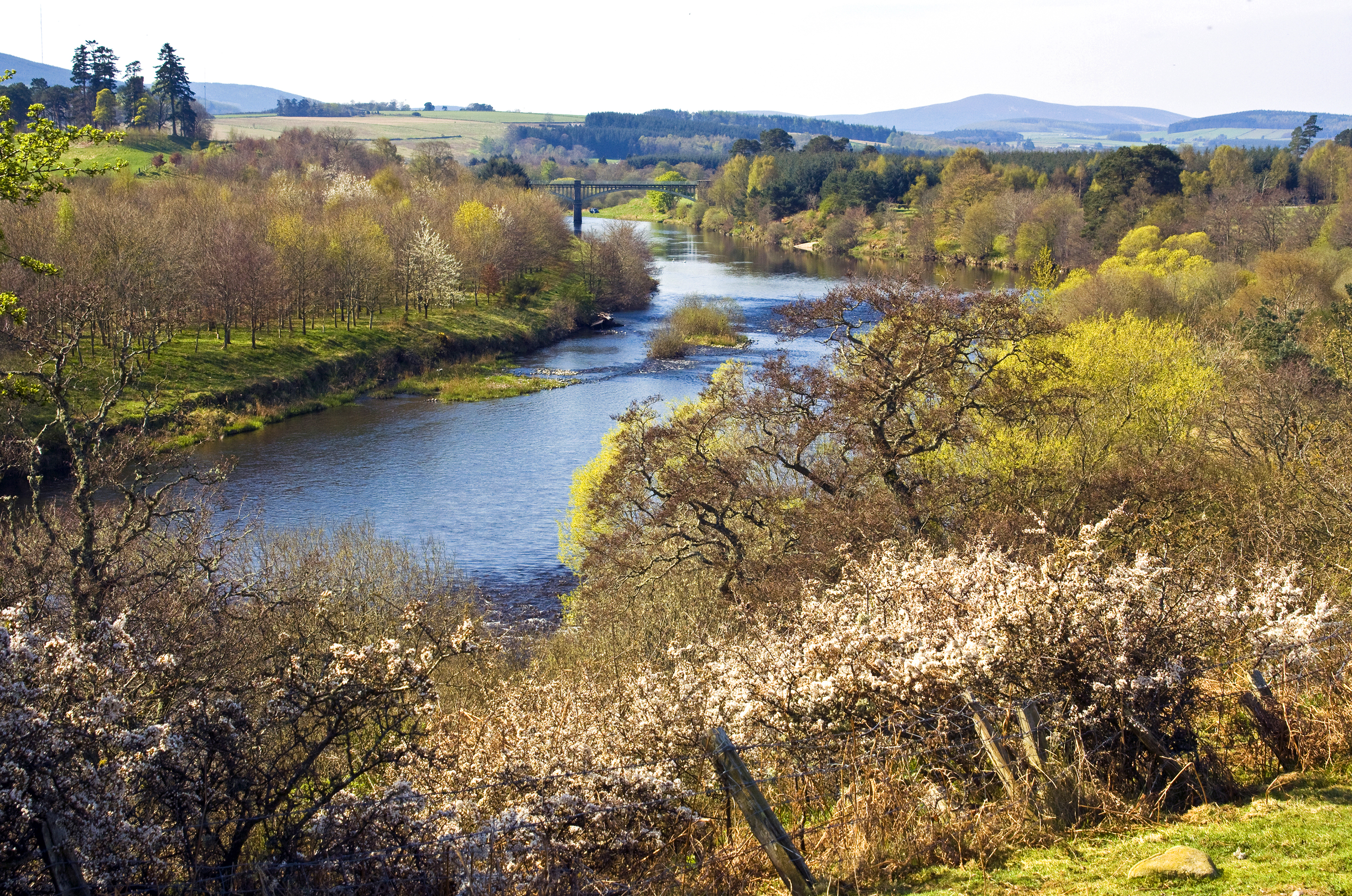
- The River Dee at Drumoak
Date	1402
Location	Drumoak, Aberdeenshire, Scotland
Result	Clan Irvine victory

Belligerents
Clan Irvine	Clan Keith

The Battle of Drumoak, also known as the Battle of Keith's Muir, was a Scottish clan battle that took place at Drumoak, Aberdeenshire, Scotland in 1402. It was fought between the Clan Irvine whose chiefs were seated at Drum Castle and the Clan Keith whose chiefs were the Earls Marischal.

== Background ==
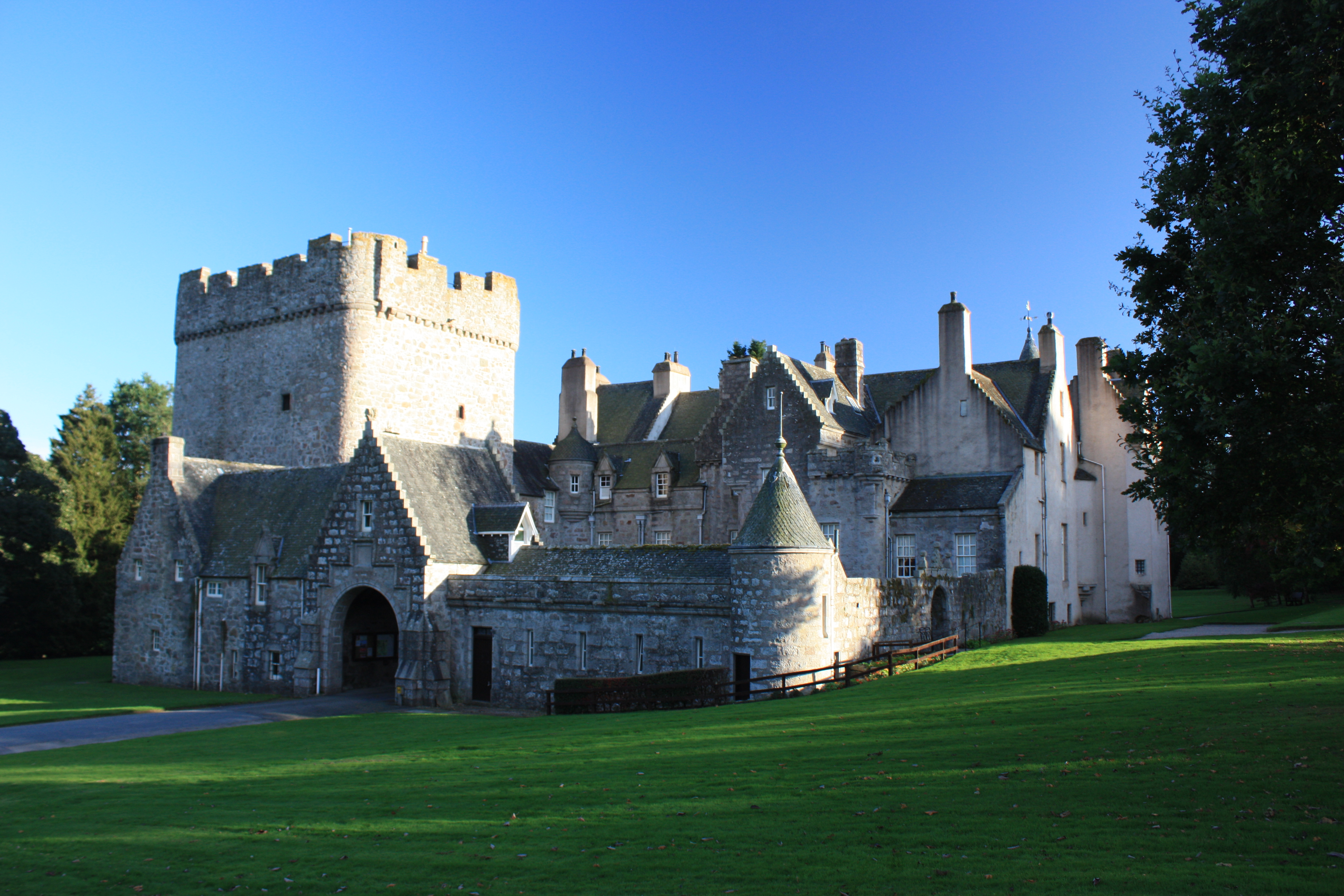
Drum Castle, seat of the chief of Clan Irvine

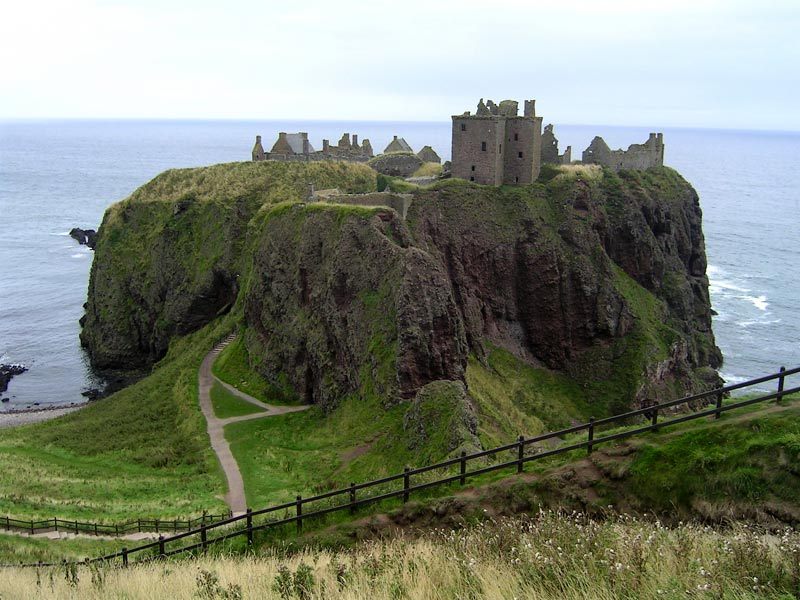
Dunnottar Castle, seat of the chief of Clan Keith

According to Leslie, at around 1393, the feud between the Irvines of Drum and Keiths (Marischal) raged most fiercely. According to an old manuscript "the old feud was cruell betwixt the two families; as that Marischall's people burnt one of Drum's children in hot wort; and Drum burnt Hall-forest, and wasted sundry lands of Marischall's all in revenge of that wrong".

== The battle ==
A foray was made by the Keiths upon the lands of the Irvines, but the Irvines overtook the Keiths before they could secure their plunder by crossing the River Dee. According to the New Statistical Account of Scotland a fight took place between the two clans on a moor on the north bank of the River Dee which is now known as Keith's Muir. The Irvines were victorious and drove their enemies across a deep and rocky part of the channel which is now known as Keith's Pot, where many of them were drowned. The leader of the Keiths is said to have made it to a rock that protrudes above the water line but was killed by the Irvine's arrows and this rock is now known as The Keith Stone.

== Aftermath ==
By mediation of the King it was arranged for Irvine of Drum's eldest son to marry the daughter of Keith the Earl Marischal. There was never any difference between the two families after this marriage, but Irvine apparently held some resentment as although he was polite to his lady he never consummated the marriage. In 1411 Irvine of Drum took part in the Battle of Harlaw where he held command in the Lowland army and where he engaged in a duel with Maclean of Duart Castle in which both were killed.

== Archaeology ==
Arrowheads have been found at Keith's Muir (moor) and have been linked with the battle.
