= Clan Irvine =

Scottish clan from Aberdeenshire

- Irbhinn
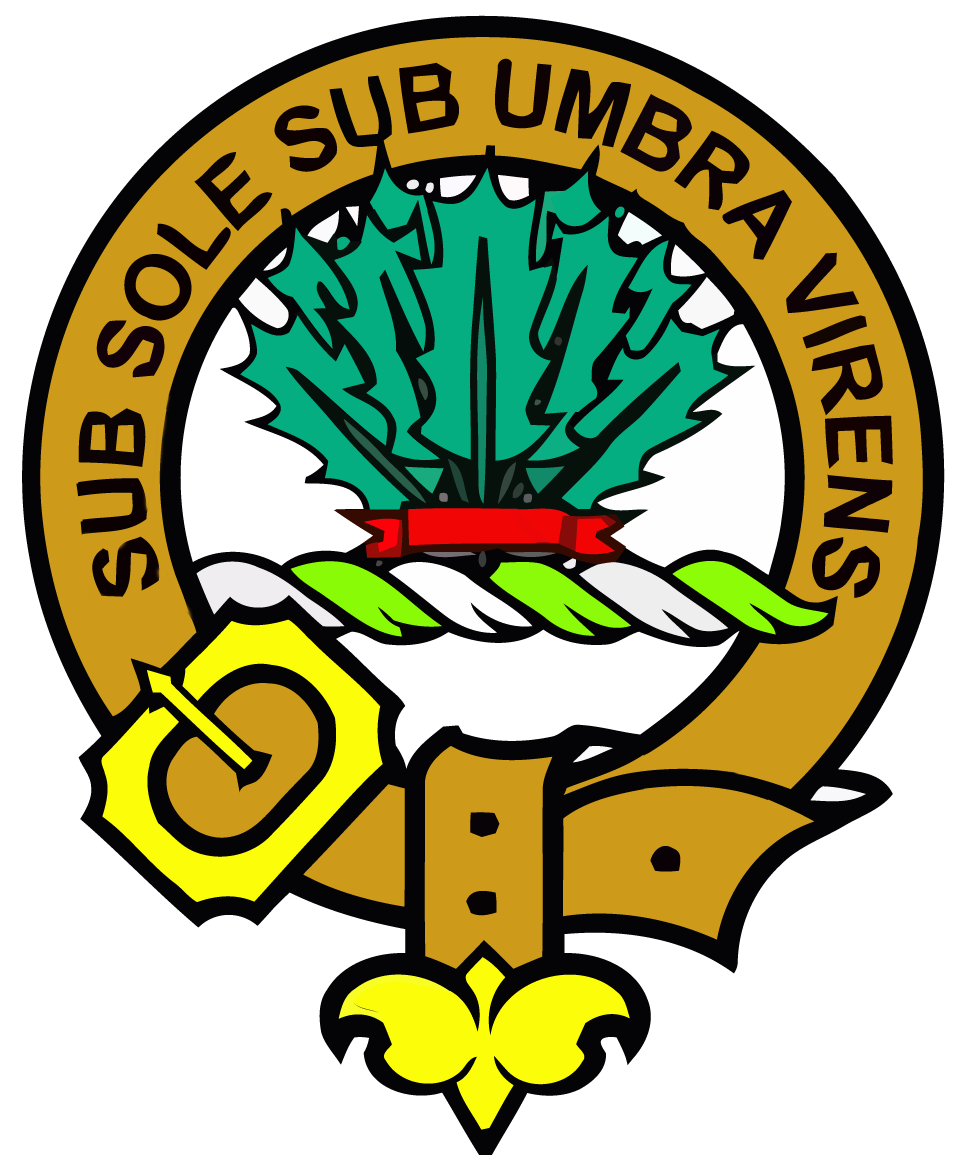
- Crest: A sheaf of Holly consisting of nine leaves Vert slipped and banded Gules.
- Motto: SUB SOLE SUB UMBRA VIRENS (Latin: "Flourishing both in sunshine and in shade"). {Alternative Latin definition} "Green shadow beneath the sun"

Profile
- Region: Aberdeenshire

Chief
- Alexander Irvine of Drum, 27th Baron of Drum
- Seat: Drum Castle
Allied clans
Clan Bruce
Rival clans
Clan Keith (from 1402 to 2002)
Clan Maclean

Clan Irvine is a Scottish clan.

== History ==
=== Origins of the clan ===
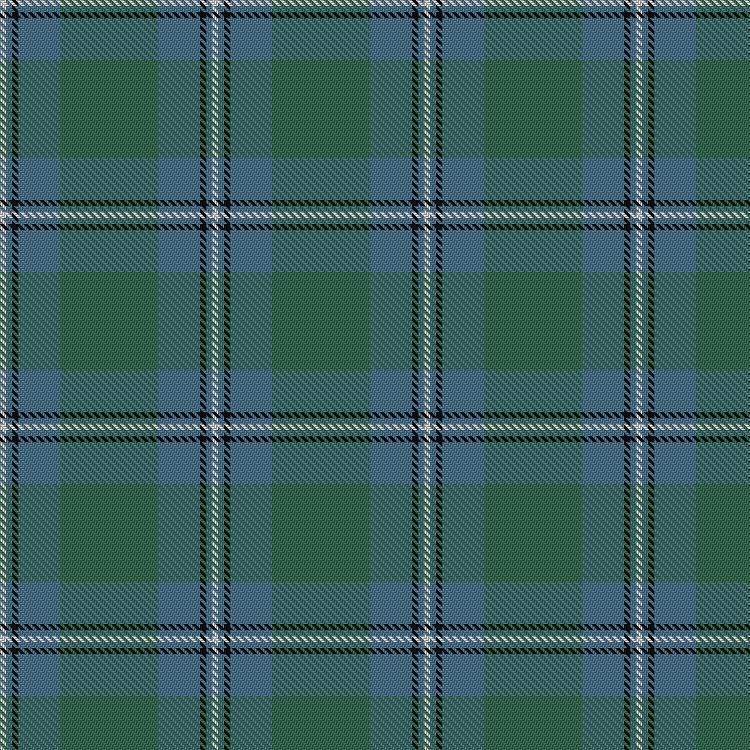
Irvine tartan

Sometime between 1124 and 1125 Gilchrist, son of Erwini, witnessed a charter of the Lords of Galloway. The first lands by the name of Irvine were in Dumfriesshire. According to family tradition, the origin of the clan chief's family is connected with the early Celtic monarchs of Scotland. Duncan Irvine settled at Bonshaw. Duncan was the brother of Crinan, who claimed descent from the High Kings of Ireland, through the Abbots of Dunkeld. Crinan married a daughter of Malcolm II of Scotland and their son was Duncan I of Scotland.

William de Irwyn was the second son of Irving of Bonshaw and was taken into Royal Service by the king Robert the Bruce For twenty years of faithful service William de Irwyn was granted the royal forest of Drum, in Aberdeenshire, as a reward. This then became the seat of the chief of Clan Irvine of Drum. There was already a tower at Drum which was built before the end of the 13th century as a royal hunting lodge. From this grew Drum Castle, seat of the chief.

Origin of the crest badge – "Robert Bruce, who, when a fugitive from the court of Edward I., was concealed by Irving of Bonshaw on numerous occasions and it is his second son William De Irwyn who went into Royal Service |William De Irwyn followed the changing fortunes of his royal master; was with him when he was routed at Methven; shared his subsequent dangers; and was one of the seven who were hidden with him in a copse of holly when his pursuers passed by. When Bruce came to his own again, he made him Master of the Rolls and, ten years after the Battle of Bannockburn, gave him in free barony the forest of Drum, near Aberdeen. He also permitted him to use his private badge of three holly leaves with the motto, Sub sole sub umbra virens, which are still the arms of the Irving family."

=== 15th century and clan conflicts ===
Clan Irvine was often at feud with the neighbouring Clan Keith. Both clans invaded each other's lands. In 1402, Clan Irvine is said to have slaughtered an invading war party of Clan Keith at the Battle of Drumoak.

The third Laird of Drum was Alexander Irvine, who was the first in a line of twelve Irvines who successively bore the name Alexander. He was said to be a knight of legendary prowess and followed the Earl of Mar to the wars in France. He later fought at the Battle of Harlaw in 1411, which was fought only twenty miles away from Drum itself. At Harlaw Alexander Irvine engaged in single combat with the famous Hector Maclean of the Battles, chief of the Clan Maclean. Both are said to have died from wounds that they inflicted on each other. This is commemorated in a ballad about the battle as "Gude Sir Alexander Irvine the much renounit Laird of Drum".

=== 16th century and Anglo-Scottish Wars ===
The next Laird of Drum was a prominent figure in the negotiations to ransom James I of Scotland from the English and when the king was released de Irwyne was knighted. When the king was murdered in Perth, Sir Alexander Irvine took control of the city of Aberdeen to restore order.

The sixth Laird of Drum and chief of Clan Irvine was a peacemaker, and was rewarded by King James V of Scotland for his efforts to suppress rebels, thieves, reivers, sorcerers and murderers in 1527.

During the Anglo-Scottish Wars the sixth Laird's son was killed when the clan fought against the English at the Battle of Pinkie Cleugh in 1547.

=== 17th century and Civil War ===
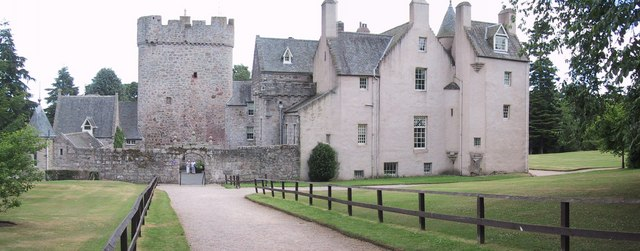
Drum Castle, seat of the chief of Clan Irvine, was attacked twice during the Civil War.

During the Civil War, the royalist Irvines supported Charles I. However the Irvines lived in a mainly Covenanter district and Drum Castle was therefore an obvious target. The castle was attacked when the Laird of Drum was absent by a strong force that surrounded it with artillery. Lady Irvine surrendered and the castle was then looted. The Laird of Drum's two sons both fought in the civil war and were both captured. The younger son, Robert, died in the dungeons of Edinburgh Castle, however his brother, Alexander, was freed after James Graham, 1st Marquis of Montrose's victory at the Battle of Kilsyth in 1645. Drum Castle was again attacked, ransacked, the ladies of the house were ejected and the estate was ruined.

=== 18th century and Jacobite risings ===
During the Jacobite rising of 1715, the fourteenth Laird of Drum supported the Jacobite cause and fought at the Battle of Sheriffmuir in 1715 where he received a severe head wound. He never recovered from the wound and after years of illness died leaving no direct heir. The estate then passed to his uncle, John Irvine and then onto another kinsman, John Irvine of Crimond.

During the Jacobite rising of 1745 the Clan Irvine continued their support for the Jacobite Stuarts and fought at the Battle of Culloden in 1746. The Laird of Drum escaped capture by hiding in a secret room at Drum Castle. He then lived for a few years in exile in France until he was allowed to return to his estates.

=== 19th and 20th centuries ===
The twenty-second Laird of Drum fought in the Grenadier Guards during World War I.

=== The clan today ===
In 2002, the previous Chief of Clan Irvine entered into a peace treaty with the 13th Earl of Kintore, who was the previous Chief of Clan Keith, at an elaborate ceremony on the banks of the River Dee to end their 600-year feud.

== Clan chief ==
- Clan chief: Alexander Irvine of Drum, 27th Baron of Drum

== Clan castles ==
- Drum Castle

== See also ==
- Scottish clan
- Irvine (disambiguation)
- Irving (Swedish noble family)
