= Robert III Keith, Marischal of Scotland =

Sir Robert Keith
- Great Marischal of Scotland
- Arms of Keith, Earl Marischal: Argent, on a chief gules, three palets or.
- Died: 1346
- Noble family: Clan Keith
- Spouse: Margaret de la Hay
- Father: John Keith

Sir Robert Keith (died 1346) was a Scottish nobleman and a hereditary Great Marischal of Scotland.

== Biography ==
Sir Robert Keith was the son of John Keith, Master of Marischal, (Note: The title "Master of Marischal is a courtesy title given to a Scottish heir presumptive who either had not yet inherited at that time, or for some reason did not inherit the title (in this case Marischal of Scotland). See the Complete Peerage, Vol. IV, Appendix E: Courtesy Titles. The name of John's wife, Robert's mother, is unknown. See Complete Peerage VIII, 470.) and the grandson of Robert II Keith, Marischal of Scotland, who commanded the Scottish cavalry at the Battle of Bannockburn, and his wife Barbara Douglas. He succeeded his grandfather as Great Marischal.

Robert Keith fought for King David II of Scotland in his wars against Edward Balliol and the English. He was also the Sheriff of Aberdeen. He accompanied King David when he fled for protection to France where the exiled Scottish royal court was given Château Gaillard as a residence. There Sir Robert acted as the king's tutor in arms. When David II, King of Scotland invaded England in 1346, Robert was with him. At the Battle of Neville's Cross on 17 October 1346, he was killed. He was succeeded by his brother, Sir Edward Keith, Great Marischal of Scotland.

The following is from the National Encyclopedia, Vol VIII, P 165, London.

William MacKenzie

69 Ludgate Hill, Edinburgh.

KEITH

"The family of Keith is one of the most ancient and historical in Scotland. The office of the Kings Marischal was attached to the lands of Keith in East Lothian, and in 1305 Sir Robert of Keith, hereditary Marischal of Scotland was justiciary of Scotland from the Forth to the Mounth, and sat in the English Council at Westminster as a Scottish representative. He commanded the Scots cavalry at Bannockburn, and afterwards married a relative of Bruce. Through this alliance the Keiths acquired large estates in Kincardinshire, and, by purchase, the sea-girt rock of Dunnattor, where they built a castle, which they made their chief seat. The family was ennobled about 1458, and the fourth earl nearly doubled his domains by marriage with the heiress of Inveragie, and was reputed the wealthiest peer in Scotland. these vast possessions passed to George, the fifth earl Marischal, and founder of Marischal College, Aberdeen, who succeeded his grandfather in 1581. His memory has been perpetuated mainly by his enlightened munifence displayed in the establishment of the above college."

== Family ==
Robert married Margaret, daughter of Gilbert de la Hay, Constable of Scotland. They had the following children:

- William Keith.
- Edward Keith.
- Margaret Keith, she married Hugh Arbuthnot, Lord of Arbuthnot.

== See also ==
- Clan Keith
