= Edward Keith =

Scottish noble (d. c1351)

Sir Edward Keith
- Great Marischal of Scotland
- Arms of Keith, Earl Marischal: Argent, on a chief gules, three palets or.
- Noble family: Clan Keith
- Spouses: Isabella de Synton; Christian Menteith
- Father: William de Keith
- Mother: Barbara de Seaton

Sir Edward Keith (d. 1351) was a Scottish nobleman and hereditary 11th Marischal of Scotland.

== Biography ==
Sir Edward Keith was the son of William de Keith (d. c. 1293), 8th Marischal of Scotland, and Barbara de Seaton, daughter of Adam de Seaton. In 1328 he received a charter to the lands of Kelly from King Robert the Bruce, witnessed by his brother Robert II Keith, Marischal of Scotland. Neither he nor his brother Robert were at the Battle of Halidon Hill but his son William, fighting under Sir Archibald Douglas was taken prisoner there. He inherited the hereditary Sheriffdom of Selkirk through his first wife, Isabella de Synton. Sir Edward Keith died before 1351 and succeeded by his son William.

== Family ==
Sir Edward Keith married first, before July 1305, Isabella de Synton, daughter of Alexander de Synton. Together they had:

- Sir William Keith, Marischal of Scotland, succeeded his father as 12th Marischal of Scotland.
- John Keith, who married (with a dispensation dated 12 March 1368/9) Mariota de Cheyne, daughter of Reginald de Cheyne.
- Catherine Keith, who married Alexander Barclay and were the ancestors of the Barclays of Ury.

He married secondly, Christian Menteith, daughter of Sir John de Menteith, Lord of Arran and his wife Ellen of Mar. They had one daughter:

- Janet Keith, who married first, Sir David Barclay of Brechin. She married secondly, before 13 April 1370, Sir Thomas Erskine of Erskine. (Note: It was through this marriage that the son of Janet and Thomas, Robert Erskine, 1st Lord Erskine, claimed the Earldom of Mar making Janet the link between the ancient Earls of Mar and the modern Earls of Mar. See: Complete Peerage, Vol. VIII, p. 400-401; Scots Peerage, Vol V. pp. 598-602; Scots Peerage, Vol VI, p. 35.)

== See also ==
- Clan Keith
