= The Battle of the Champions =

The Battle of the Champions is the traditional name given to the Battle of the 300 Champions, which pitted Argos against Sparta in 546 BC. It may also refer to:

- Battle of Champions, a trial by combat fought in 1478 or 1464 between two Scottish clans
- Aaron Pryor vs. Alexis Argüello, a 1982 boxing match billed as The Battle of the Champions
- The Battle of Champions (boxing), a 1982 boxing card featuring Wilfredo Gómez vs. Lupe Pintor and Wilfred Benítez vs. Thomas Hearns
- Dance India Dance: Battle of the Champions, an Indian television reality series
