= Ackergill Tower =

Castle in Highland, Scotland

- Wick, Caithness, Scotland; GB grid reference ND352546
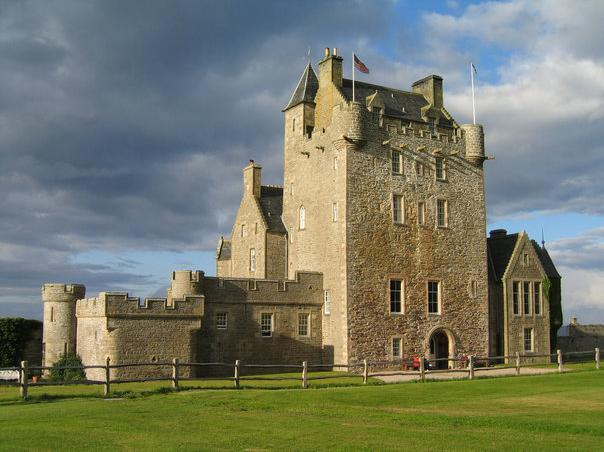
- Ackergill Tower

Site information
- Type: Tower house with some extensions
- Owner: Private, Dr Betsee Parker
- Condition: Intact

Location
- Location in Caithness, Scotland
- Coordinates: 58.47480°N 3.11273°W

Site history
- Built: Late 15th or early 16th century
- Built by: Clan Keith
- In use: 15th century to present
- Materials: Stone

Ackergill Tower (or Ackergill Castle) is located on the coast of Sinclair's Bay, about 2.5 miles (4.0 km) north of Wick, Caithness, in northern Scotland. It was built in the early 16th century, and is a Category A listed building. The building is a five-storey oblong tower house. The four-storey wing to the rear was added in the early 18th century.

From 2014, Ackergill Tower was operated as an events and wedding venue by AmaZing Venues until 2019.

== History ==
=== Early history ===
The Clan Keith, under John Keith of Inverugie, inherited the lands of Ackergill in 1354 from the Cheyne family. Ackergill Tower may have been built by his son, but was first mentioned in 1538.

=== Keiths and Sinclairs ===
In 1547, the Sinclairs of Girnigoe attacked and seized the castle. Mary of Guise, then Regent of Scotland, granted the Sinclairs remission for this and returned Ackergill Tower to the Keiths. She later installed Laurence Oliphant, 4th Lord Oliphant, as keeper of Ackergill in 1549. The Sinclairs again captured the castle in 1556, for which they were again granted remission. John Keith, Captain of Ackergill, was present at the death of Mary of Guise at Edinburgh in 1560.

In 1593, Robert Keith, brother to George Keith, 5th Earl Marischal (who rightfully owned the tower), seized Ackergill by force, for which he was declared a rebel, and the castle was returned to the Earl. In September 1597 John Keith of Subster attacked the tower in the dead of night, climbing the walls with ladders, taking its occupants by surprise and capturing the place.

In 1612, the Sinclairs acquired Ackergill Tower once again, but through legal means, when it was sold to the Earl of Caithness by the Earl Marischal. However, by 1623 it was under assault once more, when it was besieged by Sir Robert Gordon during his feud with George Sinclair, 5th Earl of Caithness. The Sinclairs surrendered the castle before any assault took place.

In 1651, Oliver Cromwell may have used Ackergill Tower to garrison his troops during his siege of the Keith's Dunnottar Castle, when he was hunting for the Honours of Scotland. In 1676, John Campbell, 2nd Earl of Breadalbane and Holland took possession of Ackergill Tower in repayment of debts owed to him by the Sinclairs.

=== Later history ===
John Campbell put Ackergill Tower up for sale in 1699, and it was bought by Sir William Dunbar of Hempriggs. The Dunbars began extensive renovations, including the addition of a lean-to-shaped extension to the tower. In the mid-19th century, further additions including a cap-house were made by the architect David Bryce on behalf of George Sutherland Dunbar, 7th Lord Duffus. In 1963, Maureen Blake, who as a girl lived with her mother and C. S. Lewis for about twenty years, became the eighth baronetess of Hempriggs and the steward of Ackergill Tower until it was sold in 1986. The castle underwent a two-year period of restoration work before re-opening as a hotel.

The tower was later sold and the new owners, AmaZing Venues, part of Clarenco LLP, acquired a five-star rating in 2012 having spent £2 million upgrading facilities.
