= Battle of Champions =

1478 Scottish clan wars battle

Coordinates: 58°28′30″N 3°5′5″W

- Part of the Scottish clan wars
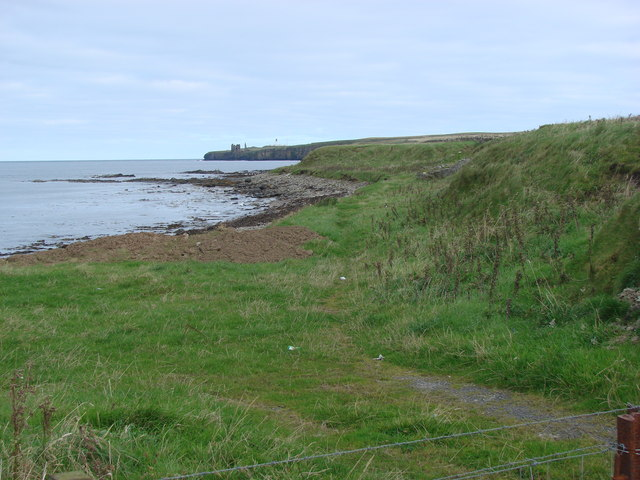
- Looking east to Girnigoe, St Tears is up on the right
| Date | 1478 or 1464 |
| Location | St Tears Chapel, north of Wick Airport, Caithness grid reference ND367545 |
| Result | Keith victory |

Belligerents
| Clan Keith | Clan Gunn |

Commanders and leaders
| Keith of Ackergill | George Gunn † |

Strength
| 24 | 12 |

Casualties and losses
| >12 | 12 |

The Battle of Champions was a trial by combat fought in 1478 or 1464 between two Scottish clans, Clan Gunn and Clan Keith. It took place at the chapel of St Tears (St Tayre) on the coast north of Wick in Caithness, between Ackergill Tower and Girnigoe Castle. It was arranged to settle a dispute with a battle between twelve horse on either side. However, the Keiths arrived with two men on each of their twelve horses, and massacred the 12 Gunns. The clans finally signed a treaty of friendship in 1978, ending the feud after 500 years.

== Background ==
It is recorded that the feud began when Dugald, Chieftain of the Keiths, abducted Helen of Braemore, daughter of Lachlan Gunn, when he discovered that she was betrothed to Alexander Gunn. The attack occurred on the night before the wedding, and Alexander was one of those slain by the Keiths. Helen subsequently committed suicide by throwing herself off Ackergill Tower. Subsequent conflicts between the two clans were for the most part indecisive, and losses were numerous on both sides. After long quarreling between the Keiths and Gunns it was decided that a "battle of champions" would be fought between twelve horse on either side (the Gunn clan still argues the wording) but the Keiths arrived with two men on each horse.

== Battle ==
=== Conflicts of the Clans ===
An account of the battle was written in the book Conflicts of the Clans, published by the Foulis Press in 1764, written from a manuscript from the time of King James VI of Scotland (1566–1625):

About the year of God 1478, there was some dissention in Caithness betwixt the Keiths and the Clan Gunn. A meeting was appointed for their reconciliation, at the Chapel of St. Tayre, in Caithness, hard by Girnigo, with twelve horse on either side. The Crowner (chieftain of Clan Gunn) with the most part of his sons and chief kinsmen came to the chapel, to the number of twelve; and, as they were within the chapel at their prayers, the Laird of Inverugie and Ackergill arrived there with twelve horse, and two men upon every horse; thinking it no breach of trust to come with twenty-four men, seeing they had but twelve horses as was appointed. So the twenty-four gentlemen rushed in at the door of the chapel, and invaded the Crowner and his company unawares; who, nevertheless, made great resistance. In the end eight the Clan Gunn were slain, with most of the Keiths. Their blood may be seen to this day upon the walls within the Chapel at St. Tyre, where they were slain. Afterwards William Mackames (the Crowner's grandchild) in revenge of his grandfather, killed George Keith of Ackergill and his son, with ten of their men, at Drummuny in Sutherland, as they were travelling from Inverugie into Caithness.

=== Robert Mackay ===
Robert Mackay wrote an account of the battle in his book the History of the House and Clan of the Name Mackay (1829), quoting from historian Sir Robert Gordon (1580–1656):

After long quarreling between the Keiths and Guns, it was agreed that riders on twelve horses each side should meet at the Chapel of St Tayr, near Ackergill, to adjust all their differences. At the time appointed the chieften of the Guns with eleven men of his tribe attended; and as the Keiths had not arrived, they employed the intermediate time in devotion. At length the Keiths appeared on twelve horses, but with double riders on each, and immediately set upon the Guns, and killed ever man of them, but with the loss of the greater part of their own number. Sir Robert who relates to the tragedy, says their blood was seen on the walls of the chapel in his time.The chieften or coroner's son, James Gunn, then left Caithness with his clan, and settled in Sutherland, where they became wardens of that district. William, son of this James, and a number of his tribe, afterwards intercepted George Keith of Ackergill, accompanied by his son and twelve of their followers, on their journey from Inverguey to Caithness, and killed them all in revenge of the above massacre. This William was surnamed Mackamish, i.e. son of James; and thenceforward the chieften of the clan Gunn has always been titled Mackamissh.

== Treaty ending the Keith/Gunn feud ==
By the 1970s, with North American members of both clans on friendly terms, the feud between them was no longer an issue. At the urging of their clan members, the Chief of Clan Keith, Sir James Ian Keith, Earl of Kintore, and the Commander of Clan Gunn, Ian Alexander Gunn of Banniskirk, signed a "Bond and Covenant of Friendship" on 28 July 1978, at the site of St. Tears on the 500th anniversary of the battle there. The treaty has since been celebrated by some members of both clans at Highland games and other common gatherings.
