= Keith Marischal =

Historic site in East Lothian, Scotland

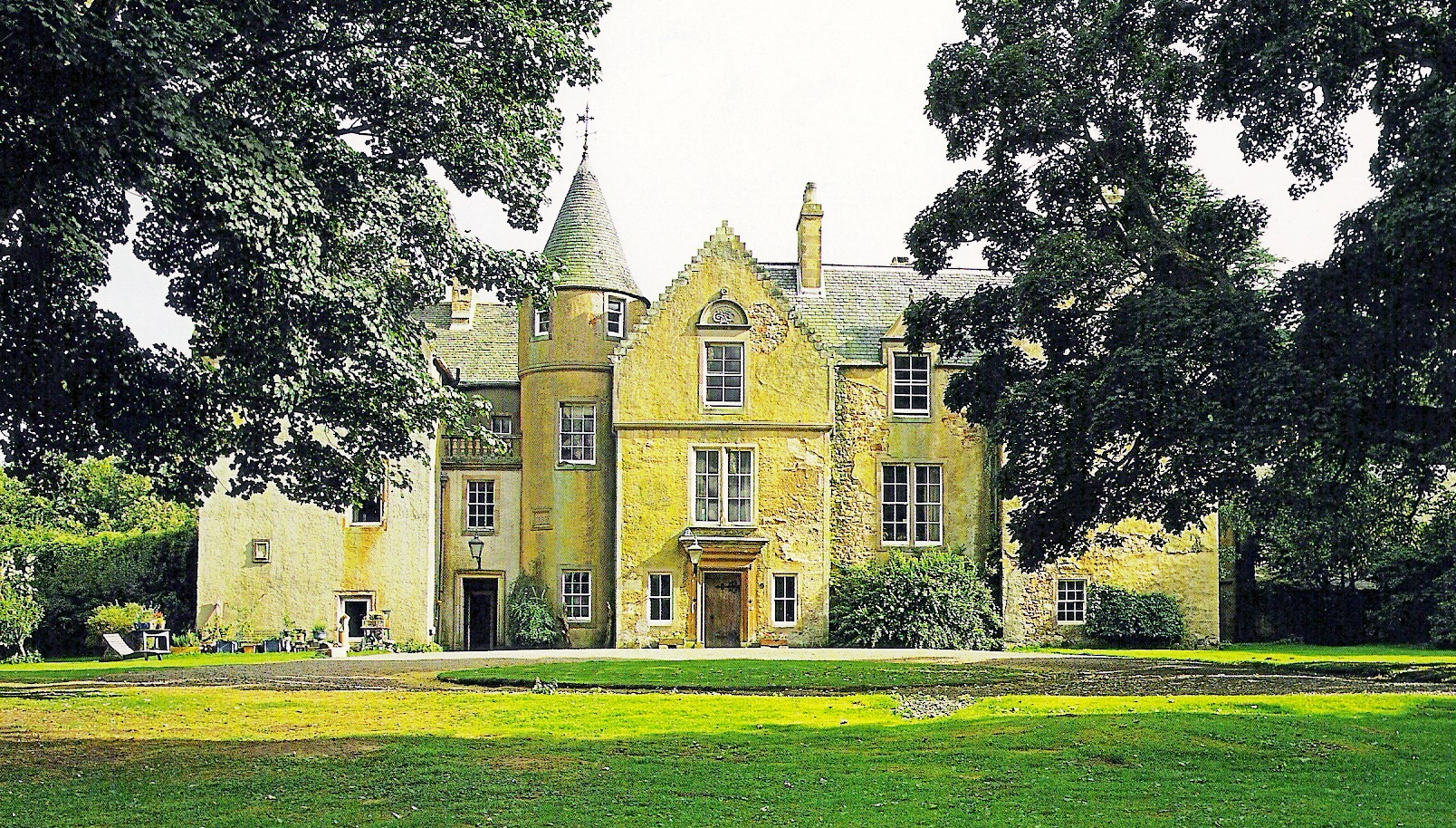
- Northern facade and entrance
- Interactive map of Keith Marischal
- 55.869722°N 2.881944°W
- Location: Humbie, East Lothian

Listed Building – Category B
- Official name: Keith Marischal House
- Designated: 5 February 1971
- Reference no.: LB7752

Scheduled monument
- Official name: Keith Kirk
- Type: Ecclesiastical: church
- Designated: 20 June 1936
- Reference no.: SM758

Keith Marischal is a Scottish Baronial country house lying in the parish of Humbie, East Lothian, Scotland. The original building was an "L-shaped" tower house, built long before 1589 when it was extended into a U-shaped courtyard house. The building acquired its modern appearance in the 19th century when the courtyard was filled in. The house is protected as a category B listed building.

== Etymology ==
The name Keith is thought to derive from the Brittonic language word */kɛːt/ (related to modern Welsh coed), meaning 'wood'.

== Early and mediaeval history ==
In legend, the lands of Keith were granted to Marbhachir Chamuis (Camus Slayer), in recognition of his valour at the Battle of Barry in 1010; he is the mythological ancestor of the Keith family.

The lands of Keith were possessed in the reign of King David I by Simon Fraser of Keith, the first of that surname to appear on record in Scotland. Fraser was one of the Normans who accompanied King David Scotland back to Scotland. Fraser was made Sheriff of Tweeddale. He is recorded in a charter gifting some lands and dedicating a church to the Tironensian Brothers at Kelso Abbey.

It is unclear how the policies at Keith were transferred to another Norman, Hervey de Keith, the King's Marischal. It is likely that the lands formed part of a dowry. Hervey, certainly held the lands at Keith when he erected a Church there at the end of the 12th century obeying a royal decree to that effect. Latterly Hervey's progeny took their name from their estate as was common at the time

Today's parish of Humbie was originally split into the divisions of "Keith Harvey" and "Keith Hundeby" (occasionally "Keith Symmars") and formed the major part of the estate of the Keiths, until they were granted the rock of Dunnottar in Aberdeenshire at the close of the 14th century. Hervey's descendants were made hereditary Marischal of Scotland in 1176.

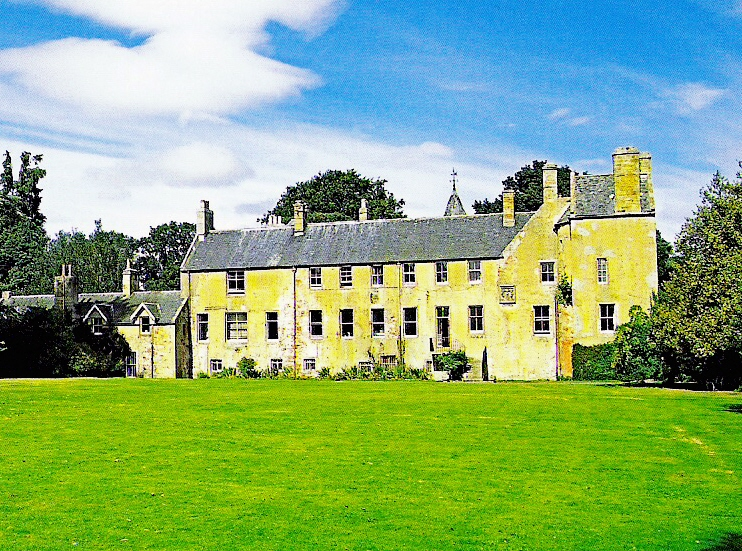
Southern facade of Keith Marischal House

== 16th and 17th centuries ==
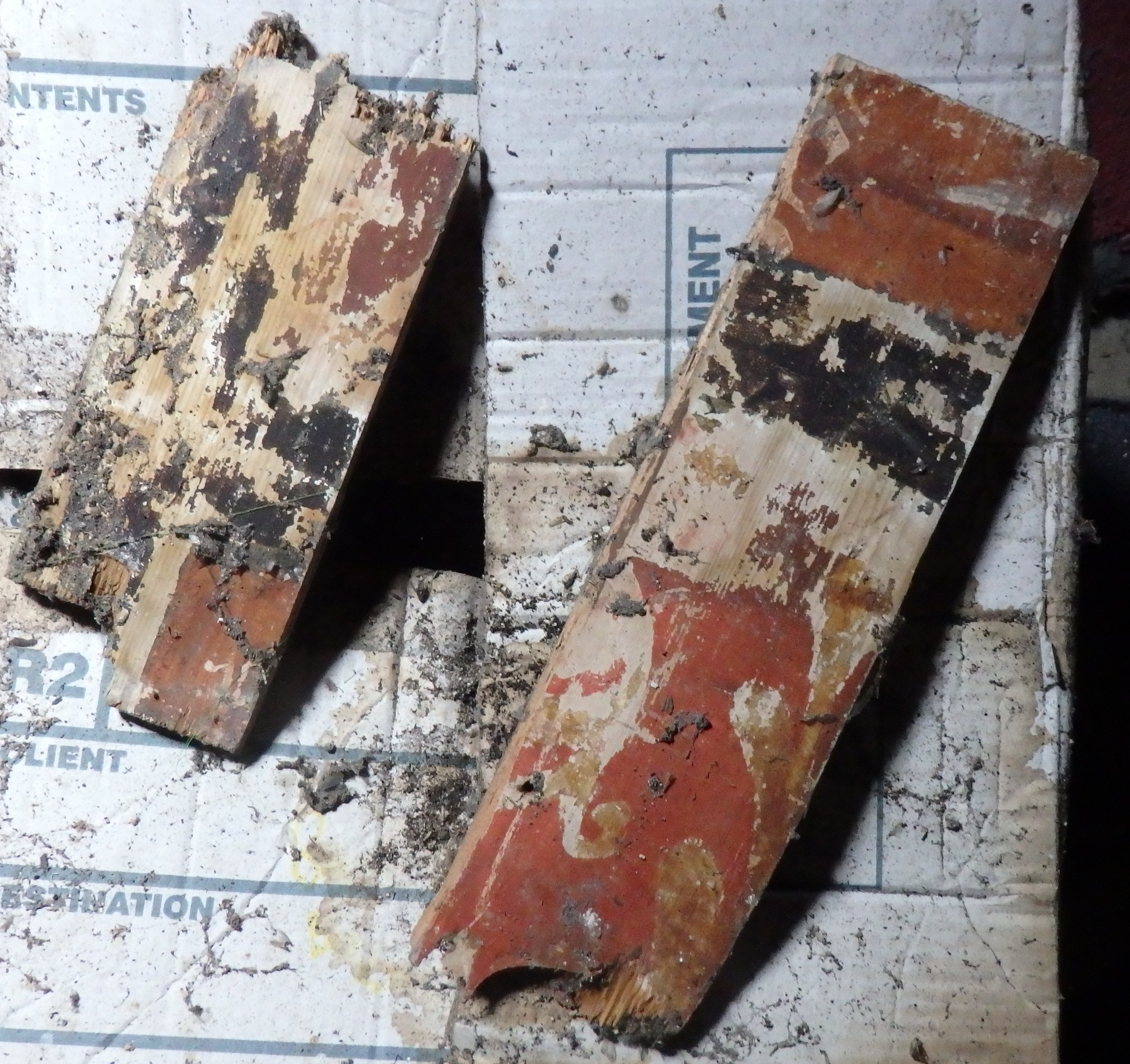
Fragments of painted pine boards from a ceiling at Keith Marischal House

The house was mentioned in a legal action involving the Earl Marischal and William Hog of Vigorshauch in 1489. Hog was said to have prevented the Earl entering the house and fortalice at Nether Keith, while the Earl had taken Hog's sheep. The war known as the Rough Wooing came to "Nether Keith" on 31 January 1550. Two barn yards at the Place of Nether Keith were burnt as well as houses in the village. The English raiders were chased back to Dunglass. William Keith, 4th Earl Marischal, stayed at Keith Marischal in June 1554 or 1555.

The house was built as an L-plan tower before 1589 by George Keith, 5th Earl Marischal, on the remainder of a previous construction which is heavily obscured, only just discernible in the massive thickness of the southern ground floor internally. Within the grounds there is evidence of a Barmekin and earthworks in the adjoining cattle meadow, which would indicate a mediaeval or earlier settlement or castleton.

George had stood proxy for King James VI during his marriage to Anne of Denmark in August 1589. The roof trusses of the tower are reputed to have been made from timber gifted to him by the Danish King Christian IV for services rendered. There are also remains of a Scottish Renaissance painted ceiling.

== Witchcraft ==
King James went to Norway in November 1589 to collect his bride in person, returning the following spring. As they were entering the Firth of Forth, a storm broke out, threatening the royal flotilla. The superstitious James blamed the tempest on witchcraft; this led to the infamous North Berwick Witch trials. Although the coven was reputedly led by Francis Stewart, 1st Earl of Bothwell, one of the leading accused was Agnes Sampson. Sampson was known as the "Wise Wife of Keith" and lived at Nether Keith, some quarter of a mile from the house. Indeed, one of the latest witch trials in Scotland took place at Humbie in 1678. The accused were held within the Chapel at Keith Marischal for the evening prior to their execution, which took place at Dow Syke (lit. dismal hollow) one mile to the north of the house.

== 18th century to the present ==
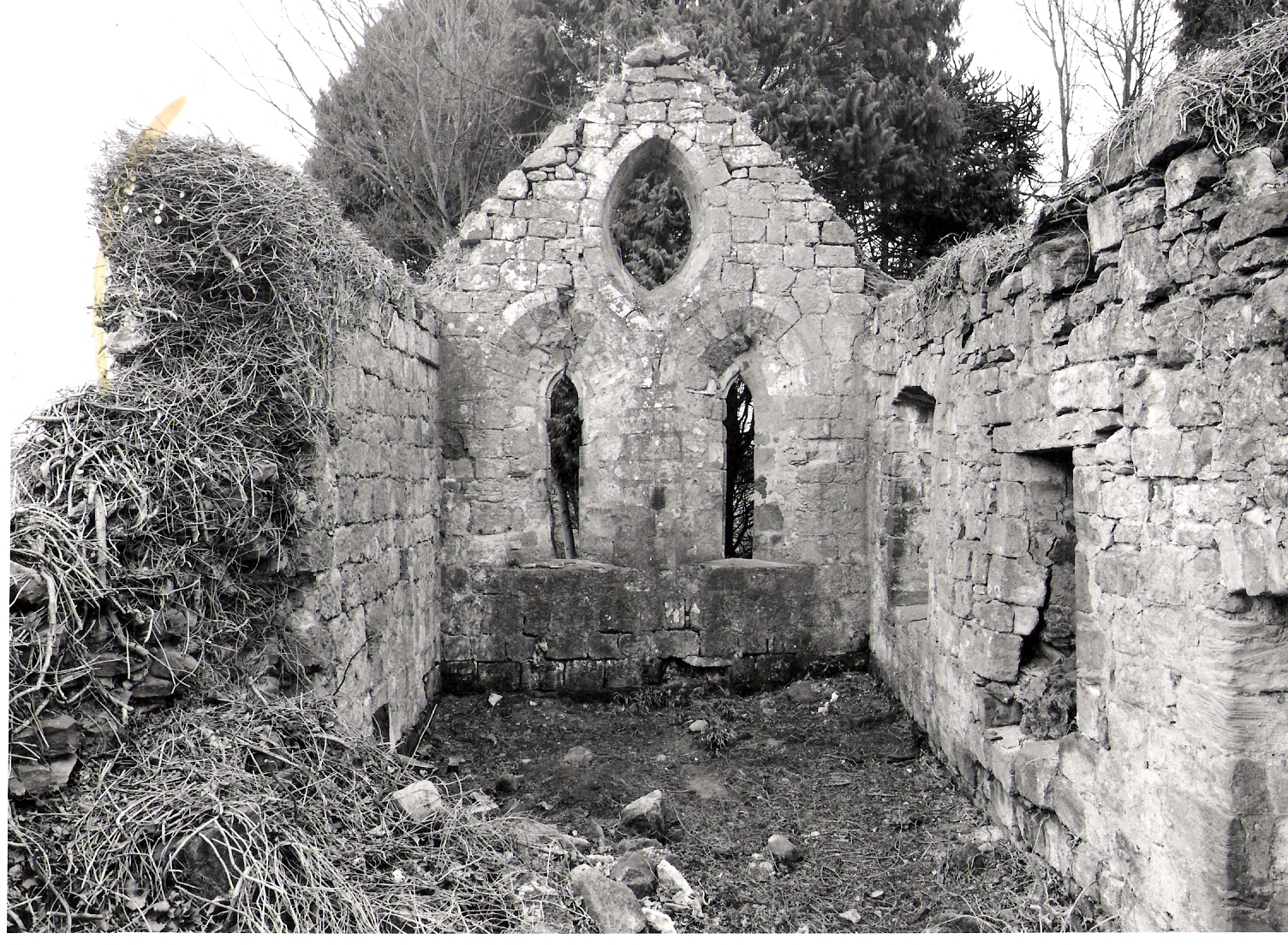
Ruined Chapel at Keith Marischal

Its sale in the late 17th century, to the Earls of Hopetoun, was to see much structural alteration to the building. The Hopes were originally an Edinburgh family with strong links to the law. During the Williamite Revolution the Keiths were attainted as Jacobites. The Earl Marischal was coerced into the redistribution of his properties, Keith Marischal included. The Hope family were engaged in wholesale acquisition of the property of Jacobite sympathisers and eventually managed to amass massive estates in the Lothians over the course of the 18th century. It is they who carried out the quasi-symmetrical extension to the west of the house to construct a new wing, forming a courtyard house. The east wing is the original tower. The walled garden was added in 1807.

Before 1889, it was sold to the family of Patrick Fraser Tytler who hired the Edinburgh firm of Peddie and Kinnear to construct an extension that would fill in the courtyard and provide corridors in the building rather than the more archaic passage from room to room. It is at this time that the exterior was baronialised with faux turrets and crawstep gabling to complement those extant. In 1953, the property was acquired by the architect Sir Robert Hogg Matthew; since 2016, it has been owned by a branch of the Campbell family.

== Other buildings ==
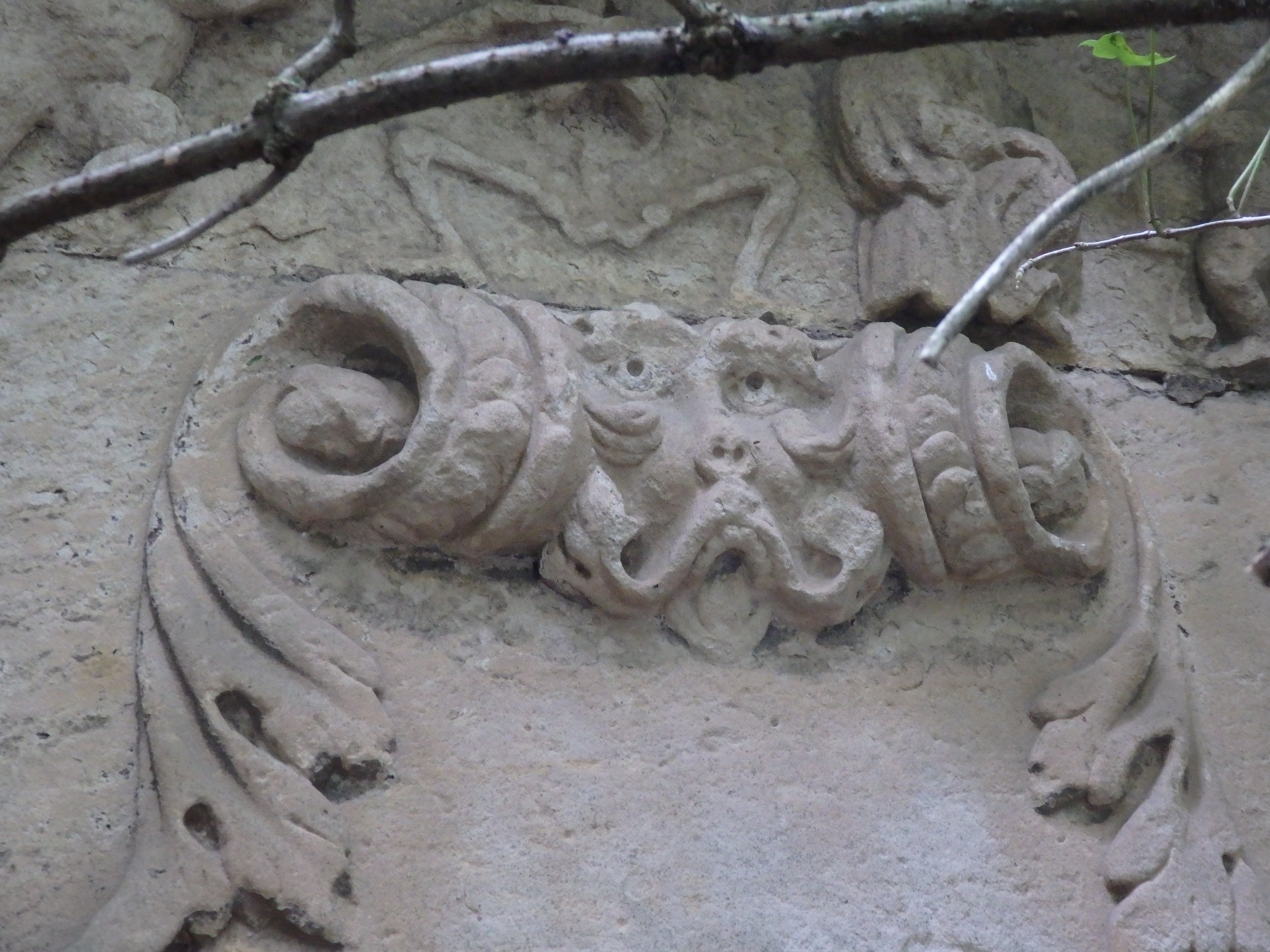
Detail of the Anderson of Whitburn monument

The ruined chapel that stands in the grounds of the House, across the burn, is a scheduled monument, which is of early Norman Gothic style. The structure is presumably the church that Harvey de Keith raised by decree of King David. There is a 19th-century plaque commemorating this on the chancel gable. Although unsympathetically restored and stabilised in that period as a folly, there is still a wealth of detail that points to its antiquity. These include a fine early 17th-century monument to the Anderson family, spiro-form carvings on the exterior of the Ogee window of possible Rosicrucian significance, and the unidentified tombstone of a crusading knight. It is possible that this is a memorial to Sir William Keith, a companion of Sir James Douglas on his campaign to take the heart of Robert the Bruce to the Holy Land. Upon the failure of that mission Keith brought back the heart of Bruce to Melrose Abbey, and the body of Douglas to St Bride's Church, Douglas.

In 1618 the parish of Keith Marischal was merged with Humbie, and the chapel at Keith Marischal was no longer a parish church. It may have been used as a private chapel for the Keith family.
