= Irving (Swedish noble family) =

Family of Swedish nobility

Irving was a Swedish noble family of Scottish origin. It descended from the Irvines, who were barons of Tullock. George Irvine came from Scotland to Sweden during the reign of king Charles IX. His son, colonel and commandant of Stade, Alexander Irvine was naturalised with name Irving as a Swedish nobleman and his family was introduced into the Swedish House of Nobility wih nr 308. The family became extinct 1748.
