= Robert II Keith, Marischal of Scotland =

Scottish noble and diplomat

Sir Robert Keith
- Arms of Keith, Earl Marischal: Argent, on a chief gules, three palets or.
- Died: 11 August 1332; Dupplin Moor, Scotland
- Military career
- Allegiance: Kingdom of Scotland
- Commands: Scottish cavalry at Bannockburn
- Conflicts: Battle of Inverurie; Battle of Bannockburn; Battle of Dupplin Moor
- Other work: Diplomat, again soldier

Sir Robert Keith (died 11 August 1332) was a Scottish knight, diplomat, and hereditary Marischal of Scotland who commanded forces loyal to Robert Bruce at the Battle of Bannockburn.

”Sir Robert Keith II, Keith Earl Marischals married Elizabeth Strachan, and had a son, Sir Robert Keith III (d. 1346) who married Elizabeth, the daughter of John Comyn, a potent man".

== Service before Bannockburn ==
Under Malcolm IV, the title Marischal of Scotland had been bestowed on Keith's ancestors, a title which became hereditary and was passed on from one Keith to the next. Robert Keith was the great-great-grandson of Hervey de Keith, great-grandson of Philip de Keith (d. c. 1225), paternal grandson of ... de Keith and son of William de Keith (d. c. 1293), all his predecessors as Marischals. He took up a military career as a young man, but was also considered by other Scottish barons to be something of a leader, being appointed justiciary of the lands beyond the River Forth.

He was captured by the English in a skirmish near the River Cree on 7 October 1300, imprisoned in England and was released, serving as Sheriff of Aberdeen under the English in 1304 until 1305. In March 1309, Keith was present at Robert I of Scotland's first parliament at St Andrews.

== Bannockburn ==
Keith served as a relatively senior general with Bruce's army throughout the war, and, prior to the Battle of Bannockburn in 1314, was appointed co-leader of a reconnoitering force sent out to gather information about the army of King Edward II of England. During the battle itself, he commanded about 500 Scottish cavalry, although, like other Scottish knights, he may have fought dismounted.

Keith and his men were held back by King Robert the Bruce. They flanked the archers and routed the English archers, who had in other battles done severe damage to Scottish armies. The battle was a decisive victory for the Scots, following which Bruce had undisputed military control of Scotland, excepting the Royal Burgh of Berwick-upon-Tweed.

== Later years ==
Keith was among the Scottish magnates who in 1320 signed a letter to the Pope vindicating Scottish independence. Afterward, he was given several diplomatic assignments, serving as a peace commissioner to England in 1323. He was killed fighting for King David II of Scotland at the Battle of Dupplin Moor.

== Ancestors and descendants ==
Sir Robert Keith was the great-great-great-grandson of Hervey de Keith, the first Marischal of Scotland.

Keith's grandson and successor as Marischal, also named Robert Keith, was killed during the Battle of Neville's Cross in 1346. Keith's indirect descendants, eventually known as the Earls Marischal, held that title for several centuries to come. During the English Civil War, one of his descendants fought as a Royalist officer, and was imprisoned under Oliver Cromwell's regime.

Political offices
Preceded by William Keith	Marischal of Scotland	Succeeded by Robert Keith
Legal offices
Preceded by John Comyn, Earl of Buchan	Justiciar of Scotia c. 1305–1306 with Reginald Cheyne (c. 1305–1306); John de Vaux (c. 1305–1306); William Inge (c. 1305–1306)	Succeeded by Uncertain, next known was Robert Lauder of Quarrelwood
