= Clan Keith =

Highland and Lowland Scottish clan

- Ceiteach, Mac Shithich
- Crest: Out of a crest coronet Or, a roebuck's head Proper, attired Or.
- Motto: Veritas vincit (Truth conquers)
- Slogan: A Keith, Veritas Vincit (also Truth Prevails)
- War cry: A Keith, Veritas Vincit

Profile
- Region: Lowlands and Highlands
- District: East Lothian, Aberdeenshire (lowlands), and Caithness (highlands)
- Plant badge: White Rose
- Animal: Badger

Chief
- Sir James William Falconer Keith of Urie, 14th Earl of Kintore
- Earl of Kintore; Lord Keith of Inverurie and Keith Hall; Viscount Stonehaven; Baron Stonehaven; Baronet; 6th of Ury
- Seat: Keith Hall, Aberdeenshire
- Historic seat: Keith Marischal House; Dunnottar Castle; Fetteresso Castle
- Last Chief: Michael Keith, 13th Earl of Kintore
Septs of Clan Keith
Austen, Austin, Cate, Cates, Dick, Dickson, Dixon, Dixson, Falconer, Falkner, Faulkner, Faulknor, Fawkner, Hackston, Harvey, Haxton, Hervey, Hurrie, Hurry, Keath, Keech, Keeth, Keyth, Kite, Laird, Lumgair, MacKeith, Marshall, Ouston, Urie, Urry
Clan branches
Keith of Kintore (current chiefs)
Keith of Marischal (historic chiefs)
Allied clans
Clan Forbes
Clan Cameron
Rival clans
Clan Irvine (from 1402 to 2002)
Clan Gunn (from 1478 to 1978)

Clan Keith is a Highland and Lowland Scottish clan, whose chief historically held the hereditary title of Marischal, then Great Marischal, then Earl Marischal of Scotland.

== History ==
=== Origins of the clan ===
Arms of Keith, Earl Marischal: Argent, on a chief gules, three palets or.

The place-name Keith comes from a Cumbric or Pictish form of the Modern Welsh coed ("wood").

A warrior of the Chatti tribe is said to have killed the Danish General, Camus, at the Battle of Barrie in 1010. For this valour Malcolm II of Scotland dipped three fingers into the blood of the dead and drew them down the warrior's shield. The warrior was thereafter named Marbhachair Chamuis which meant the Camus Slayer. The chief of Clan Keith has borne the same three lines on his shield ever since. It can be found as early as 1316 on the seal of Sir Robert de Keith.

King Malcolm's victory at the Battle of Carham in 1018 brought him into possession of Lothian, and the lands of Keith in Lothian were subsequently held by the Camus Slayer. It is from these lands that his progeny took their name.

A Norman adventurer named Hervey married the native heiress of Marbhachair and in about 1150 David I of Scotland granted her a charter for the lands of Keith. In a charter of 1176, their son was styled as Marischal of the King of Scots. The Marischal was charged with the safety of the king's person within Parliament and was also custodian of the royal regalia.

=== Wars of Scottish Independence ===
In 1308, Robert the Bruce granted the royal Halforest of Aberdeenshire to his friend, Robert de Keith. Here the Marischal built his castle. His nephew was William Keith of Galston who returned Bruce's heart to Melrose Abbey after the death of the Sir James Douglas at the Battle of Teba in Andalucia. Bruce confirmed to the family the hereditary office of marischal by a charter of 1324 and Sir Robert de Keith had commanded the Scottish cavalry at the Battle of Bannockburn. The office was held upon the condition that they bore the ancient arms that they had inherited from Marbhachair Chamuis.

Sir Robert Keith, the Marishchal, escorted the young David II of Scotland when he fled to France to escape the usurpation Edward Balliol.

=== 15th century and clan conflicts ===
The Clan Keith were often at feud with the neighbouring Clan Irvine and, in 1402, the Clan Irvine are said to have attacked and defeated an invading war party of the Clan Keith in what was known as the Battle of Drumoak.

Sir William Keith the Marischal who died in 1407 married the heiress of Sir Alexander Fraser and in doing so added great estates in Buchan, Kincardine and Lothian to his existing patrimony. William's half-brother, John Keith, married the Cheyne heiress which brought the Keiths massive estates in Inverugie as well as Inverugie Castle, which later became the seat of the clan chiefs. Three of Sir William Keith's children married children of Robert II of Scotland, while another daughter married Sir Adam Gordon, ancestor of the Earls of Huntly.

Circa 1458, the heir of the Marischal or Great Marischal was made 1st Earl Marischal and was the only peer to be styled by his office of state.

A branch of the Clan Keith who inhabited Caithness fought at the Battle of Tannach (probably 1464) where they assisted the Clan Mackay against the Clan Gunn. They later fought another battle against the Gunns, known as the Battle of Champions (probably 1478). This battle was fought between twelve men of the Clan Gunn and twenty four men of the Clan Keith. Most of the Gunns, including the chief of the clan, were killed. However, Keith of Ackergill was soon after killed by the Gunns in a revenge attack.

=== 16th and 17th centuries ===
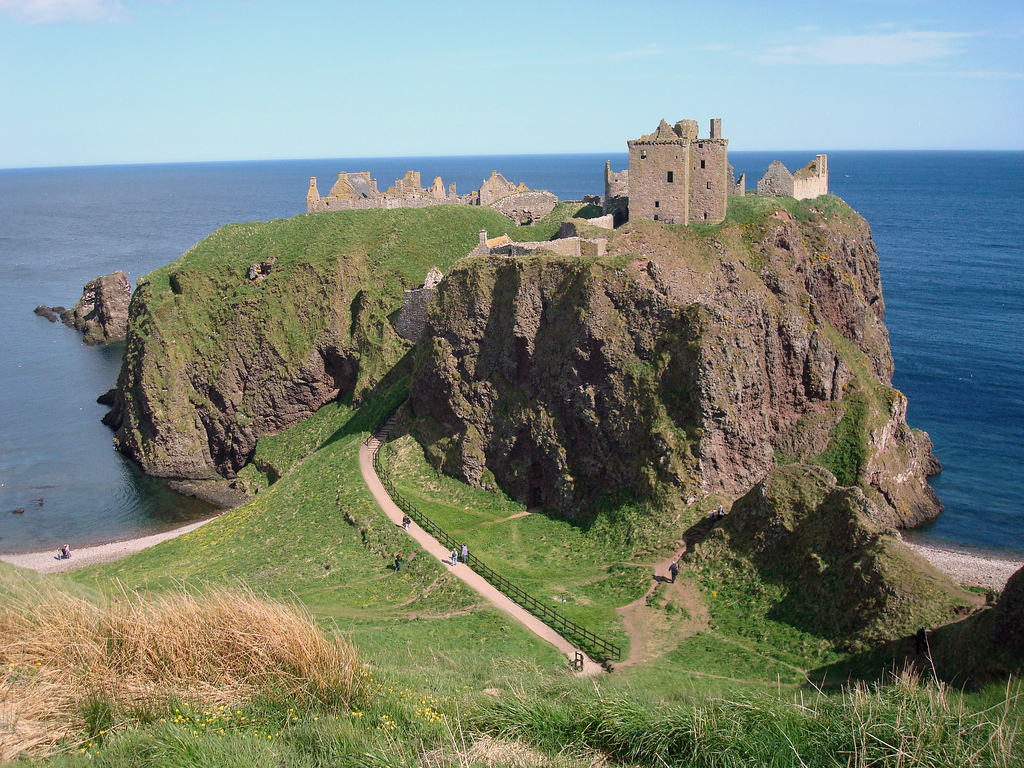
The ruins of Dunnottar Castle, a seat of the chiefs of Clan Keith

William Keith, 3rd Earl Marischal, along with the Earl of Glencairn invited John Knox the religious reformer back to Scotland in 1559. William Keith, 4th Earl Marischal, founded the Marischal College in Aberdeen. George Keith, 5th Earl Marischal, undertook the embassy to Denmark which resulted in the marriage of James VI of Scotland to Anne of Denmark.

A clansmen, William Keith of Delny (died 1599), was a Scottish courtier and Master of the Royal Wardrobe. He also served as ambassador for James VI to various countries. He was an important intermediary between George Keith, 5th Earl Marischal and the king, the king and courtiers, and the king and foreign governments.

After Charles II of England was crowned in 1651, William Keith, 7th Earl Marischal, was captured and imprisoned in the Tower of London. He remained there until the Restoration when the king appointed him a Privy Councillor and later Lord Privy Seal as recompense for what he and his family had suffered in the royal cause. After Charles's coronation the Scottish crown jewels had been hidden on the Keith lands and as a result Marischal's brother, John Keith, was created Knight Marischal and Earl of Kintore.

=== 18th century and Jacobite Risings ===
George Keith, 8th Earl Marischal, was appointed a Knight of the Most Ancient and Most Noble Order of the Thistle by James Francis Edward Stuart (the Old Pretender). During the Jacobite rising of 1715, the Clan Keith supported the Jacobite cause. As a result, George Keith, 10th Earl Marischal, along with his brother, James Francis Edward Keith, forfeited their lands, castles and titles. However the two Keith brothers played a part in Continental affairs during the 18th century with the earl being one of the very few Jacobite Knights of the Most Noble Order of the Garter. He also received the highest order in Prussia, the Order of the Black Eagle, while his brother was given Russia's Order of St. Andrew the Apostle the First-Called.

In 1801, the Right Honourable the Lord Lyon King of Arms recognised Keith of Ravelston and Dunnotter as representer of the Marischal Keiths and his nephew was dubbed Knight Marischal in 1822 for George IV's visit to Edinburgh that year.

Algernon Hawkins Thomond Keith-Falconer, 9th Earl of Kintore and 9th Lord Keith Inverurie and Keith Hall, was flamboyant and decimated the Kintore estates. However, Sir James Ian Baird of Urie then Keith of Urie, 12th Earl of Kintore, 12th Lord Keith of Inverurie and Keith Hall, 2nd Viscount Stonehaven, 2nd Baron Stonehaven and 3rd Baronet, promoted the clan internationally and appointed a Seanchaí to preserve their history and traditions.

In 1978, the chief of Clan Keith and the commander of Clan Gunn signed a peace treaty at the site of the Chapel of St. Tayrs, ending the feud between the two clans which began in 1478.

In 2002, the 13th Earl of Kintore, who was the previous Chief of Clan Keith, entered into a peace treaty the previous chief of Clan Irvine, with at an elaborate ceremony on the banks of the River Dee to end their 600-year feud.

== Chief ==
The current Chief of Clan Keith is Sir James William Falconer Keith of Urie, 14th Earl of Kintore, 14th Lord Keith of Inverurie and Keith Hall, 4th Viscount Stonehaven, 4th Baron Stonehaven, 5th Baronet, 6th of Ury (b. 15 April 1976).

== Clan tartan, crest and motto ==
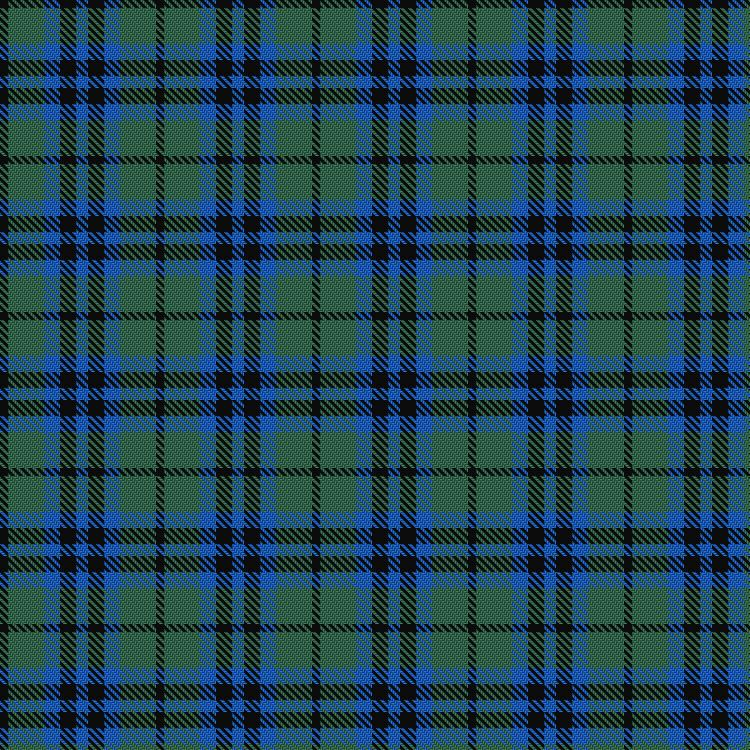
Keith Clan tartan

The Keith clan tartan is registered with the Scottish Register of Tartans (SRT) with a date of 1 January 1838. The Scottish Tartans Authority (STA) and Scottish Tartans World Register (STWR) reference numbers are both 253. The designer is not specified and the tartan was registered prior to the establishment of the SRT.

Registration notes:

Jack Dalgety notes of June 1963 state: 'This sett is the same as Falconer, Austin and Marshall and derives from Lord Falconer who took over the entailed lands of the Keith, Earl Marischal, in the early 1800s. There is a family Keith-Falconer who wear this tartan' The earliest known date from a list compiled by D.C. Stewart from Wilsons of Bannockburn letters is 1838. Also recorded in Wilson's of Bannockburn, 1819 pattern book as No. 75 or Austin. D.W. Stewart writes in Old and Rare... in 1893, "that it is included in every early collection." The Keiths were a powerful Celtic family, who held the hereditary office of Great Marischal of Scotland. They are associated with Dunottar Castle, near Stonehaven'. Wilsons of Bannockburn a weaving firm founded c. 1770 near Stirling. The pattern books are in the National Museum of Antiquities, Edinburgh. Copies of the pattern books and letters in the Scottish Tartans Society archive.

=== The clan crest and motto ===
The clan crest is a roe deer (Capreolus capreolus) also known as the western or European roe. The male of the species is sometimes referred to as a roebuck. The Clan Keith motto Veritas vincit is translated as 'Truth conquers'.

== Castles ==
- Keith Marischal House, three miles south of Pencaitland, East Lothian, is an L-plan tower house that dates from the sixteenth century. It is on the site of an earlier castle that was built by the Keiths from the fourteenth century.
- Dunnottar Castle stands on a cliff-girt promontory above the sea a couple of miles south of Stonehaven, Kincardineshire. There has been a strong-hold there since the twelfth century, although it was held by the Keiths from 1382 after they exchanged their property of Struthers with the Clan Lindsay for Dunnottar. The present ruins at Dunnottar include a tower, courtyard, chapel and the entrance to the castle that is up a steep ascent through a tunnel. Donald, King of Scots was killed there in 900 and William Wallace captured the castle from the English in 1297. Mary, Queen of Scots stayed at the castle in 1562 and James Graham, 1st Marquess of Montrose unsuccessfully laid siege to the castle in 1645. William Keith, 9th Earl Marischal entertained Charles II of England at the castle in 1650 and the Scottish regalia were kept there when Oliver Cromwell invaded in 1651. Cromwell besieged the castle in 1652 and it only capitulated after eight months by starvation and mutiny. The castle garrison had then been commanded by Sir Robert Keith, fourth son of the 6th Earl Marischal. The castle was held for William of Orange in 1689 and many Jacobites were imprisoned in it. The Duke of Argyll partly slighted the castle after George Keith, 10th Earl Marischal had supported the Jacobite rising of 1715.
- Keith Hall in Aberdeenshire, once known as Caskieben, is the current seat of the chief of Clan Keith. It is a Z-plan tower house dating from the sixteenth century.
- Fetteresso Castle passed from the Clan Strachan to the Clan Keith chief, Earl Marischal during the early 14th century.
- Ackergill Tower, a couple of miles north of Wick, Caithness is a tower and mansion that dates from the fifteenth century. It rises to five storeys and was originally held by the Cheynes but passed to the Keith Earls Marischal in about 1350. The Keiths who inhabited Caithness had a long and bitter feud with the Clan Gunn. In 1556 the Keiths were besieged in the castle by the Clan Sinclair before eventually selling it to them in 1612. Sir Robert Keith of Benholm had also once attacked the castle during a family dispute.
- Clackriach Castle, a 16th-century tower house near Maud in Aberdeenshire.

== Bibliography ==
- Chisholm, Hugh, ed. (1911). "Keith" . Encyclopædia Britannica. Vol. 15 (11th ed.). Cambridge University Press. pp. 715–716.
- References from the 1911 Encyclopædia: See
  - Calendar of Documents relating to Scotland, edited by J. Bain (4 vols., Edinburgh, 1881–1888); Peter Buchan,
  - An Account of the Ancient and Noble Family of Keith (Edinburgh, 1828);
  - Memoirs and Correspondence of Sir Robert Murray Keith, edited by Mrs. Gillespie Smyth (London, 1849);
  - John Spalding, Memorials of the Troubles in Scotland, 1624–1645 (2 vols., Spalding Club Publ. 21, 23, Aberdeen, 1850–1851);
  - Sir Robert Douglas, rev. John Philip Wood, The Peerage of Scotland (Edinburgh, 1813);
  - G.E.C., Complete Peerage, vol. iv (London, 1892).
- Homer Dixon B. "The Border or Riding Clans and History of Clan Dickson" Albany, New York Joel Munsell's Sons, Publishers 1889
- Alexander Nisbet. "Nisbet's System of Heraldry" published in Edinburgh 1722
- Frank Adam and Thomas Innes. "The Clans, Septs and Regiments of the Scottish Highlands" 1934
- Chris Brown. "Robert the Bruce, A Life Chronicled" Tempus Publishing Stroud 2004. ISBN 0-7524-2575-7
- Liber S. Marie de Calchou : registrum cartarum abbacie tironensis de Kelso, 1113–1567, II vols. Bannatyne Club, Edinburgh 1846.
