= Hervey de Keith =

Hervey de Keith (died c. 1199) was a Scoto-Norman adventurer and nobleman and first recorded Marischal of Scotland.

== Life ==
Keith took his name from the Barony of Keith, in East Lothian, which he held the north eastern part; the south western part was held by Simon Fraser. The two sections of the estate were known as Keith Harvey and Keith Symmars respectively.

In 1160 Fraser made over the Church at Keith and its revenues to the monks of Kelso Abbey, compelling Hervey de Keith to build a new church at Keith Harvey paying an annual tribute to Kelso.

Latterly Keith had legal wrangles with the Abbey of Kelso as to the level of payment that he should make to them. These troubles were smoothed out under the auspices of Jocelin, Bishop of Glasgow and Osbert, Prior of Paisley, who decreed that he must pay an annual sum of twenty shillings. In this document he is described as "Marescallus Regis Scocie".

Keith was Marischal under Kings Malcolm the Maiden and William the Lyon, and was witness to many charters under them.

Hervey de Keith died circa 1199. He signed a royal charter as late as 1199.

== Marriage and issue ==
It has been suggested that Keith married Margaret, daughter to William I, Lord of Douglas though this is doubtful. Keith had a son:

- Malcolm de Keith, who witnessed many charters between 1178 and 1220, but did not assume the role of Marischal. Keith was succeeded in his role as Marischal by his grandsons:
  - Philip de Keith
  - David de Keith

He gave origin to Clan Keith, in that accounts of the ancestry of the Keiths before Hervey by several of the older Scottish historians appear altogether legendary in character and are unsupported by historical evidence of any description.
