= Earl Marischal =

Scottish title

Earl Marischal of Scotland
- Arms of the house of Keith, hereditary holders of the title of Earl Marischal.
- Creation date: c. 1160 (Created Marischal of Scotland); c. 1458 (Raised to the Peerage as Earl Marischal)
- Peerage: Peerage of Scotland
- First holder: Hervey de Keith; as Marischal of Scotland; William Keith, 1st Earl Marischal; as Earl Marischal
- Last holder: George Keith, 10th Earl
- Status: Forfeited
- Extinction date: 1715

The title of Earl Marischal was created in the Peerage of Scotland for William Keith, the Great Marischal of Scotland.

== History ==
The office of marischal of Scotland (or Marascallus Scotie or Marscallus Scotiae) had been hereditary, held by the senior member and chief of Clan Keith, since Hervey (Herveus) de Keith, who held the office of marischal under Malcolm IV and William I. The descendant of Herveus, Sir Robert de Keith (d.1332), was confirmed in the office of Great Marischal of Scotland by King Robert the Bruce around 1324.

Robert de Keith's great-grandson, William, was raised to the peerage as earl marischal by James II in about 1458. The peerage died out when George Keith, the 10th Earl, forfeited it by joining the Jacobite Rising of 1715.

The role of the Marischal was to serve as custodian of the regalia of Scotland, and to protect the king's person when attending parliament. The former duty was fulfilled by the 7th Earl during the Wars of the Three Kingdoms, who hid them at Dunnottar Castle. The role of regulation of heraldry carried out by the English earl marshal is carried out in Scotland by the Lord Lyon King of Arms.

The separate office of knight marischal was first created for the Scottish coronation of King Charles I in 1633. The office is not heritable, although it has been held by members of the Keith family.

The title was forfeited in 1715, due to the last earl's participation in the Jacobite Rising.

== Marischals and Great Marischals of Scotland ==
1. Hervey de Keith (d. c. 1196)
2. Philip de Keith (d. c. 1225), paternal grandson of Hervey de Keith, older brother of David de Keith
3. David de Keith, paternal grandson of Hervey de Keith, younger brother of Philip de Keith (co-jointly with his brother above and paternal nephew below)
4. Hervey de Keith (d. c. 1250), paternal nephew of David de Keith
5. Richard de Keith (fl. 12??)
6. David de Keith (fl. 1269)
7. John de Keith (d. c. 1270)
8. William de Keith (d. c. 1293)
9. Sir Robert Keith (d. 1332)
10. Sir Robert Keith (d. 1346)
11. Sir Edward Keith (d. c. 1351)
12. Sir William Keith (d. c. 1410)
13. Sir Robert Keith (d. c. 1430)
14. William Keith, Marischal of Scotland (d. 1463)

== Earls Marischal of Scotland (c. 1458) ==
1. William Keith, 1st Earl Marischal (d. 1483)
2. William Keith, 2nd Earl Marischal (d. 1530)
3. William Keith, 3rd Earl Marischal (d. 1581)
4. William Keith, 4th Earl Marischal (d. 15??)
5. George Keith, 5th Earl Marischal (c. 1553 – 1623)
6. William Keith, 6th Earl Marischal (c. 1585 – 1635)
7. William Keith, 7th Earl Marischal (1614 – 1671)
8. George Keith, 8th Earl Marischal (d. 1694)
9. William Keith, 9th Earl Marischal (c. 1664 – 1712)
10. George Keith, 10th Earl Marischal (c. 1693 – 1778) (forfeit 1715)

Before the sequence was revised by Thomas Innes of Learney in 1927, the 1st Earl's father, William Keith (died 1463), was deemed to be the first Earl Marischal, so that the final Earl was the eleventh.

== Arms ==
Coat of arms of the Earl Marischal
Crest A Hart's Head erased proper armed with ten Tynes Or. Escutcheon Argent on a Chief Gules three Palets Or; behind the shield two Baton Gules semy of Thistles ensigned on the top with an Imperial Crown Or placed saltirewise being the insignia of the office of Great Marischal of Scotland. Supporters On either side a Hart proper attired as in the Crest. Motto Veritas Vincit (Truth conquers)

== See also ==
- Baron Keith
- Lord Altrie
- Earl of Kintore
- Clan Keith
- Marischal College
- Keith Marischal
