= Dunnottar Castle =

Ruined castle in Scotland

- Dùn Fhoithear
- Near Stonehaven, Aberdeenshire, Scotland
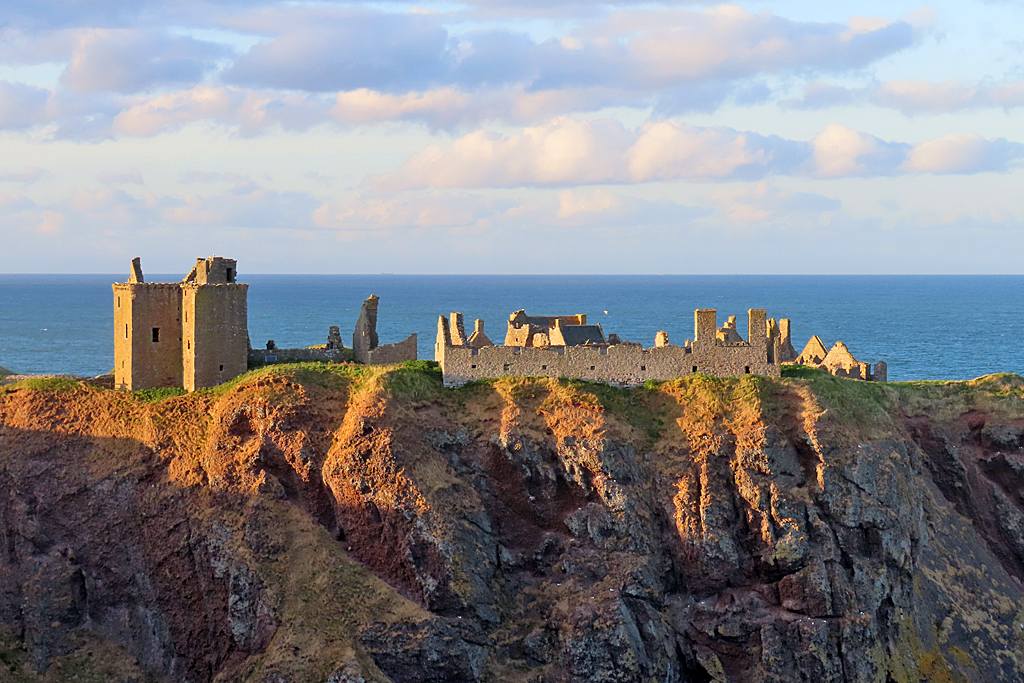
- Dunnottar Castle in 2025

Site information
- Owner: Dunecht Estates
- Controlled by: Clan Keith, Earl Marischal
- Open to the public: Yes
- Condition: Ruined

Location
- Coordinates: 56.946°N 2.197°W

Site history
- Built: c.1400–1600
- In use: Until 1718

Scheduled monument
- Official name: Dunnottar Castle
- Type: Secular: castle
- Designated: 28 April 1920
- Reference no.: SM986

Dunnottar Castle (Scottish Gaelic: Dùn Fhoithear, "fort on the shelving slope") is a ruined medieval fortress located upon a rocky headland on the northeast coast of Scotland, about 2 miles (3 kilometres) south of Stonehaven in Aberdeenshire.

The surviving buildings are largely of the 15th and 16th centuries, but the site is believed to have been fortified in the Early Middle Ages. Dunnottar has played a prominent role in the history of Scotland through to the 18th-century Jacobite risings because of its strategic location and defensive strength.

Dunnottar is best known as the place where the Honours of Scotland, the Scottish crown jewels, were hidden from Oliver Cromwell's invading army in the 17th century. The property of the Keiths from the 14th century, and the seat of the Earl Marischal, Dunnottar declined after the last Earl forfeited his titles by taking part in the Jacobite rebellion of 1715. The castle was restored in the 20th century and is now open to the public.

The castle ruins are spread over 1.4 hectares (3.5 acres), The site is surrounded by steep cliffs that drop to the North Sea, 160 feet (50 metres) below. A narrow strip of land joins the headland to the mainland, along which a steep path leads to the gatehouse. The various buildings in the castle include the 14th-century tower house as well as the 16th-century palace. Dunnottar Castle is a scheduled monument, and twelve structures on the site were listed buildings.

== History ==
=== Early Middle Ages ===
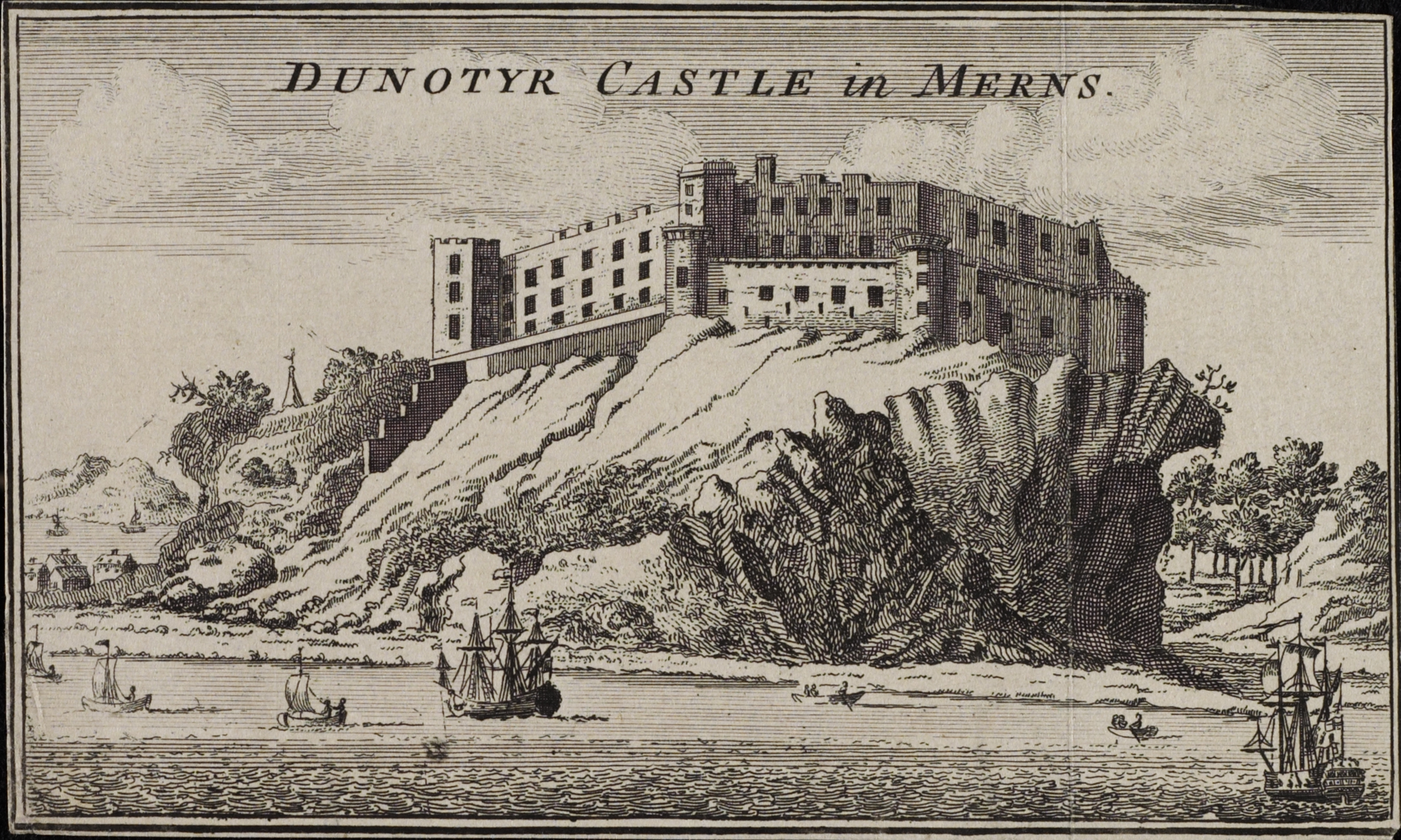
This historic view of Dunnottar Castle by the Dutch engineer John Slezer is now recognised as an incorrect labelling by his engraver. It is actually Wemyss Castle in Fife.

A chapel at Dunnottar is said to have been founded by St Ninian in the 5th century, although it is not clear when the site was first fortified. Possibly the earliest written reference to the site is found in the Annals of Ulster which record two sieges of 'Dún Foither' in 681 and 694. The earlier event has been interpreted as an attack by Brude, the Pictish king of Fortriu, to extend his power over the north-east coast of Scotland. The Chronicle of the Kings of Alba records that King Donald II of Scotland, the first ruler to be called rí Alban (King of Alba), was killed at Dunnottar during an attack by Vikings in 900. The English king Æthelstan led a force into Scotland in 934, and raided as far north as Dunnottar according to the account of Symeon of Durham.

W. D. Simpson speculated that a motte might lie under the present castle, but excavations in the 1980s failed to uncover substantive evidence of early medieval fortification. The discovery of a group of Pictish stones at Dunnicaer, a nearby sea stack, has prompted speculation that Dún Foither was actually located on the adjacent headland of Bowduns, 3 miles (5 km) to the north.

=== Later Middle Ages ===
During the reign of King William the Lion (ruled 1165–1214), Dunnottar was a centre of local administration for The Mearns. The castle is named in the Roman de Fergus, an early 13th-century Arthurian romance, in which the hero Fergus must travel to Dunnottar to retrieve a magic shield. In May 1276, a church on the site was consecrated by William Wishart, Bishop of St Andrews. The poet Blind Harry relates that William Wallace captured Dunnottar from the English in 1297, during the Wars of Scottish Independence. He is said to have imprisoned 4,000 English prisoners of war in the church and burned them alive.

In 1336 Edward III of England ordered William Sinclair, 8th Baron of Roslin, to sail eight ships to the partially ruined Dunnottar for the purpose of rebuilding and fortifying the site as a forward resupply base for his northern campaign. Sinclair took with him 160 soldiers, horses and a corps of masons and carpenters. Edward himself visited in July, but the English efforts were undone before the end of the year when the Scottish Regent Sir Andrew Murray led a force that captured and again destroyed the defences of Dunnottar.

In the 14th century, Dunnottar was granted to William de Moravia, 5th Earl of Sutherland (d.1370); in 1346, a licence to crenellate was issued by David II. Around 1359, William Keith, Marischal of Scotland, married Margaret Fraser, niece of Robert the Bruce, and was granted the barony of Dunnottar at this time. Keith then gave the lands of Dunnottar to his daughter Christian and son-in-law William Lindsay of Byres, but in 1392 an excambion (exchange) was agreed whereby Keith regained Dunnottar and Lindsay took lands in Fife. William Keith completed construction of the tower house at Dunnottar, but was excommunicated for building on the consecrated ground associated with the parish church. Keith had provided a new parish church closer to Stonehaven, but was forced to write to the Pope, Benedict XIII, who issued a bull in 1395 lifting the excommunication. William Keith's descendants were made Earls Marischal in the mid 15th century, and they held Dunottar until the 18th century.

=== Rebuilding in the 1500s ===
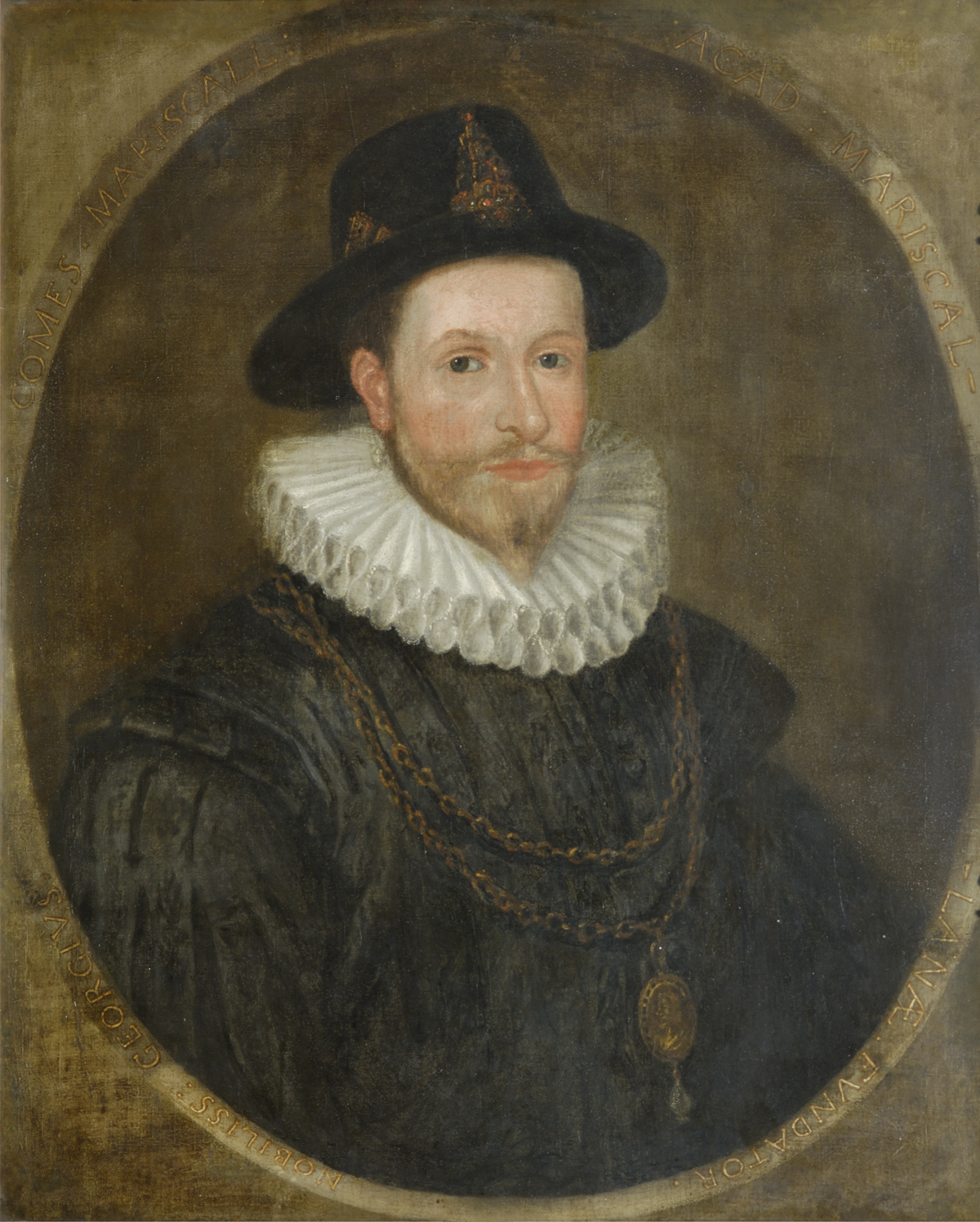
George Keith, 5th Earl Marischal, painted by Cosmo Alexander

James IV came to Dunnottar on 15 October 1504. A child played a musical instrument called a monochord for him, and he gave money to poor people. The king had brought his Italian minstrels and an African drummer, known as the "More taubronar".

Through the 1500s, the Keiths improved and expanded their principal seats: at Dunnottar and also at Keith Marischal in East Lothian. James IV visited Dunnottar in 1504, and in 1531 James V exempted the Earl's men from military service on the grounds that Dunnottar was one of the "principall strenthis of our realme". Mary, Queen of Scots, visited in 1562 after the Battle of Corrichie, She returned in September 1564, first sending a messenger boy to ask the Earl Marischal to collect provisions for her.

James VI stayed for 10 days in 1580, as part of his progress through Fife and Angus, during which a meeting of the Privy Council was convened at Dunnottar. A representative of Aberdeen council made a speech exhorting the young king to good rule recalling the reign of Robert the Bruce.

King James came again on 17 April 1589 and spent the night at Cowie watching for the Catholic rebel earls of Huntly and Erroll. During the rebellion of Catholic nobles in 1592, Dunnottar was captured by Captain Carr on behalf of the Earl of Huntly, but was restored to Lord Marischal just a few weeks later.

In 1581, George Keith succeeded as 5th Earl Marischal, and began a large-scale reconstruction that saw the medieval fortress converted into a more comfortable home. As the founder of Marischal College in Aberdeen, the 5th Earl valued Dunnottar as much for its dramatic situation as for its security. A "palace" comprising a series of ranges around a quadrangle was built on the north-eastern cliffs, creating luxurious living quarters with sea views. The 13th-century chapel was restored and incorporated into the quadrangle. An impressive stone gatehouse was constructed, now known as Benholm's Lodging, featuring numerous gun ports facing the approach. Although impressive, these are likely to have been fashionable embellishments rather than genuine defensive features. The earl had a suite of 'Samson' tapestries which may have represented his religious outlook.

=== Civil wars ===
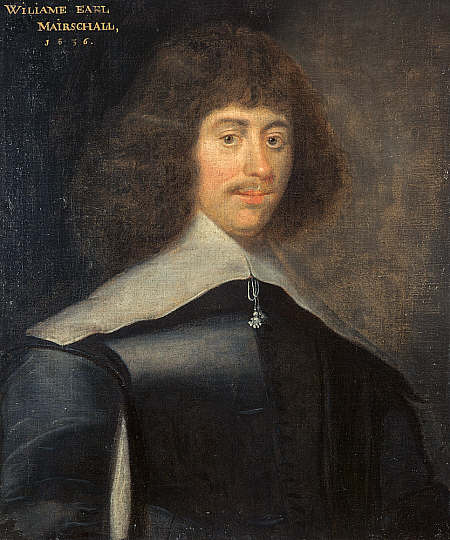
William Keith, 7th Earl Marischal, painted by George Jamesone in 1636

In 1639, William Keith, 7th Earl Marischal, came out in support of the Covenanters, a Presbyterian movement who opposed the established Episcopal Church and the changes which Charles I was attempting to impose. With James Graham, 1st Marquess of Montrose, he marched against the Catholic James Gordon, 2nd Viscount Aboyne, Earl of Huntly, and defeated an attempt by the Royalists to seize Stonehaven. However, when Montrose changed sides to the Royalists and marched north, Marischal remained in Dunnottar, even when given command of the area by Parliament, and even when Montrose burned Stonehaven.

Marischal then joined with the Engager faction, who had made a deal with the king, and led a troop of horse to the Battle of Preston (1648) in support of the royalists. Following the execution of Charles I in 1649, the Engagers gave their allegiance to his son and heir. Charles II was proclaimed king, arriving in Scotland in June 1650. He visited Dunnottar in July 1650, but his presence in Scotland prompted Oliver Cromwell to lead a force into Scotland, defeating the Scots at Dunbar in September 1650.

=== Honours of Scotland ===
Charles II was crowned at Scone Palace on 1 January 1651, at which the Honours of Scotland (the regalia of crown, sword and sceptre) were used. However, with Cromwell's troops in Lothian, the honours could not be returned to Edinburgh. The Earl Marischal, as Marischal of Scotland, had formal responsibility for the honours, and in June the Privy Council duly decided to place them at Dunnottar. They were brought to the castle by Katherine Drummond, hidden in sacks of wool. Sir George Ogilvie (or Ogilvy) of Barras was appointed lieutenant-governor of the castle, and given responsibility for its defence.

In November 1651, Cromwell's troops called on Ogilvie to surrender, but he refused. During the subsequent blockade of the castle, the removal of the Honours of Scotland was planned by Elizabeth Douglas, wife of Sir George Ogilvie, and Christian Fletcher, wife of James Granger, minister of Kinneff Parish Church. The king's papers were first removed from the castle by Anne Lindsay, a kinswoman of Elizabeth Douglas, who walked through the besieging force with the papers sewn into her clothes. Two stories exist regarding the removal of the honours themselves. Fletcher stated in 1664 that over the course of three visits to the castle in February and March 1652, she carried away the crown, sceptre, sword and sword case hidden amongst sacks of goods. Another account, given in the 18th century by a tutor to the Earl Marischal, records that the honours were lowered from the castle onto the beach, where they were collected by Fletcher's servant and carried off in a creel (basket) of seaweed. Having smuggled the honours from the castle, Fletcher and her husband buried them under the floor of the Old Kirk at Kinneff.

By May 1652 the commander of the blockade, Colonel Thomas Morgan, had taken delivery of the artillery necessary for the reduction of Dunnottar. Ogilvie surrendered on 24 May, on condition that the garrison could go free. Finding the honours gone, the Cromwellians imprisoned Ogilvie and his wife in the castle until the following year, when a false story was put about suggesting that the honours had been taken overseas. Much of the castle property was removed, including twenty-one brass cannons, and Marischal was required to sell further lands and possessions to pay fines imposed by Cromwell's government.

At the Restoration of Charles II in 1660, the honours were removed from Kinneff Church and returned to the king. Ogilvie quarrelled with Marischal's mother over who would take credit for saving the honours, though he was eventually rewarded with a baronetcy. Fletcher was awarded 2,000 merks by Parliament but the sum was never paid.

=== Whigs and Jacobites ===
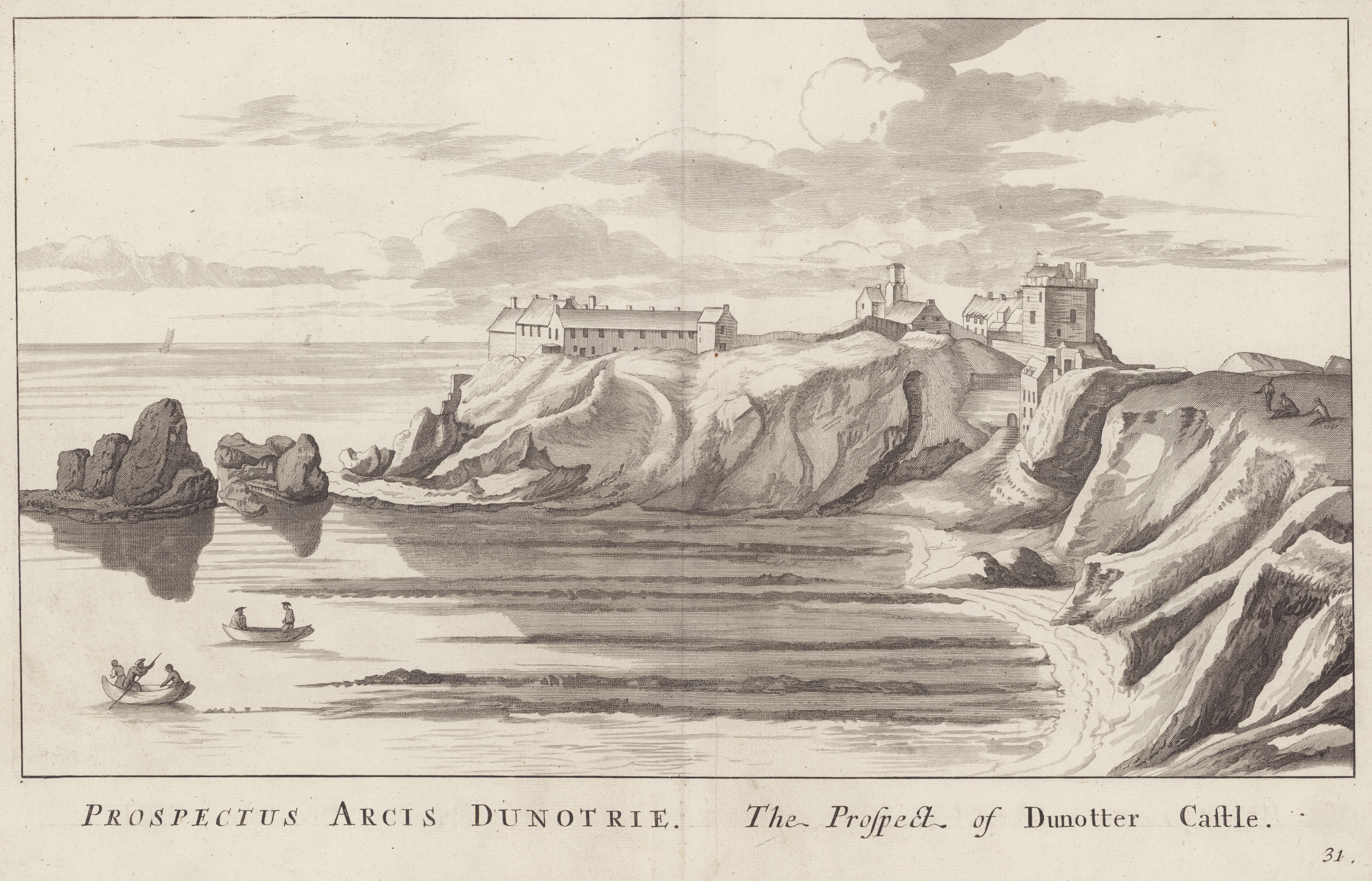
Dunnottar drawn by John Slezer in 1693

Religious and political conflicts continued to be played out at Dunnottar through the 17th and early 18th centuries. In 1685, during the rebellion of the Earl of Argyll against the new king James VII, 167 Covenanters were seized and held in a cellar at Dunnottar. The prisoners included 122 men and 45 women associated with the Whigs, an anti-Royalist group within the Covenanter movement, and had refused to take an oath of allegiance to the new king. The Whigs were imprisoned from May 24 until late July. A group of 25 escaped, although two of these were killed in a fall from the cliffs, and another 15 were recaptured. Five prisoners died in the vault, and 37 of the Whigs were released after taking the oath of allegiance. The remaining prisoners were transported to Perth Amboy, New Jersey, as part of a colonisation scheme devised by George Scot of Pitlochie. Many, like Scot himself, died on the voyage. The cellar, located beneath the "King's Bedroom" in the 16th-century castle buildings, has since become known as the "Whigs' Vault".

Both the Jacobites (supporters of the exiled Stuarts) and the Hanoverians (supporters of George I and his descendants) used Dunnottar Castle. In 1689, during Viscount Dundee's campaign in support of the deposed James VII, the castle was garrisoned for William III and Mary II with Lord Marischal appointed captain. Seventeen suspected Jacobites from Aberdeen were seized and held in the fortress for around three weeks, including George Liddell, professor of mathematics at Marischal College. In the Jacobite Rising of 1715 George Keith, 10th Earl Marischal, took an active role with the rebels, leading cavalry at the Battle of Sheriffmuir. After the subsequent abandonment of the rising Lord Marischal fled to the Continent, eventually becoming French ambassador for Frederick the Great of Prussia. Meanwhile, in 1716, his titles and estates including Dunnottar were declared forfeit to the crown.

=== Later history ===
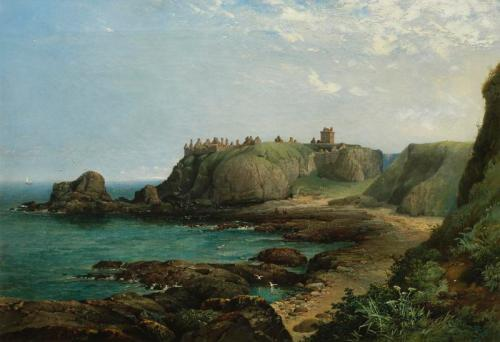
Dunnottar Castle by James Cassie, 1857

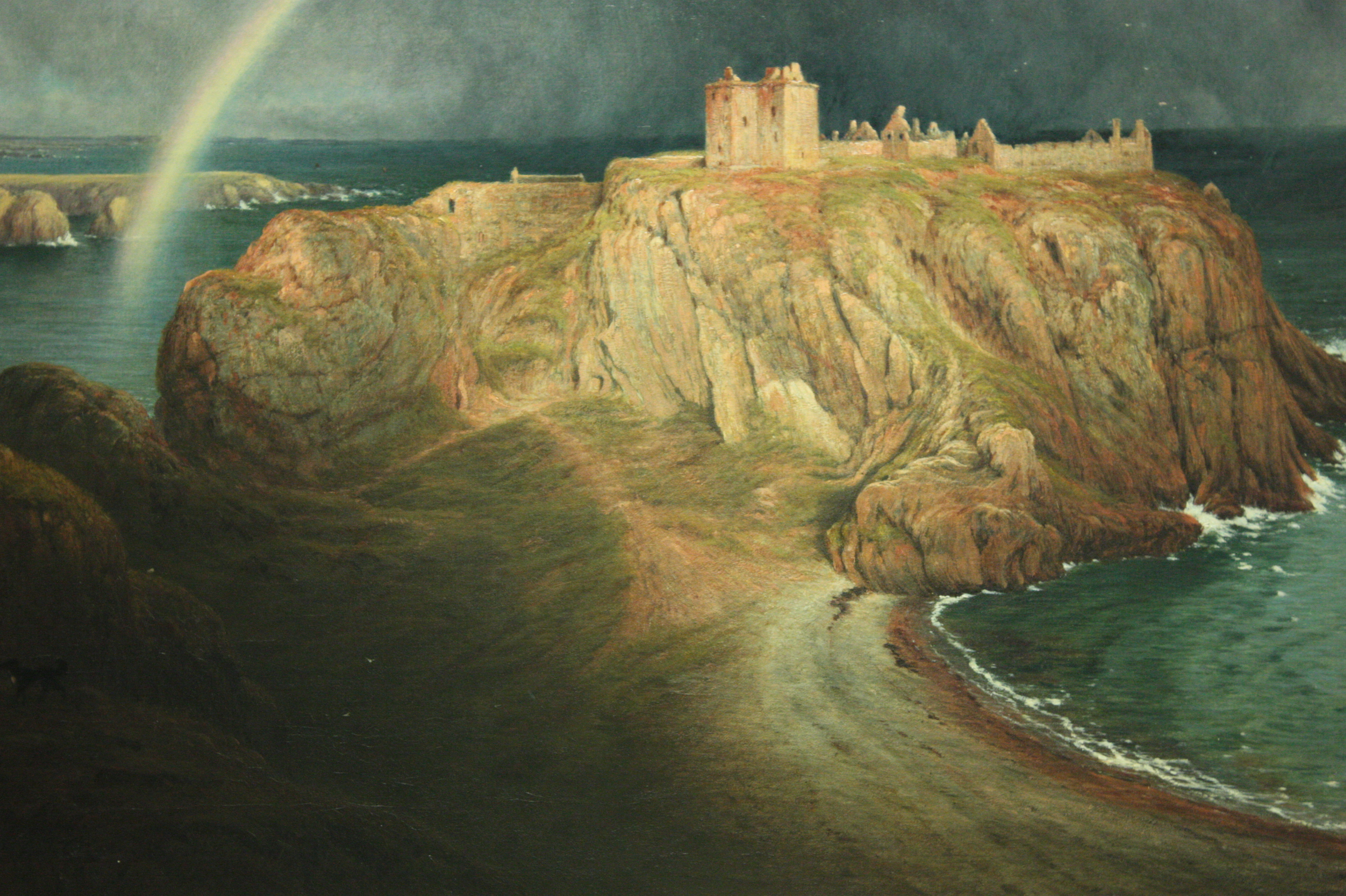
Dunnottar Castle by Waller Hugh Paton, 1867

The seized estates of the Earl Marischal were purchased in 1720 for £41,172, by the York Buildings Company who dismantled much of the castle. In 1761, the Earl briefly returned to Scotland and bought back Dunnottar only to sell it five years later to Alexander Keith (1736–1819), an Edinburgh lawyer who served as Knight Marischal of Scotland. Dunnottar was held by Alexander Keith and then his son, Sir Alexander Keith (1768–1832) before being inherited in 1852 by Sir Patrick Keith-Murray of Ochtertyre, who in turn sold it in July 1873 to Major Alexander Innes of Cowie and Raemoir for about £80,000. It was purchased by Weetman Pearson, 1st Viscount Cowdray, in 1919, after which his wife embarked on a programme of repairs. Since that time, the castle has remained in the family, and has been open to the public, attracting 52,500 visitors in 2009, and over 135,000 visitors in 2019.

Dunnottar Castle, and the headland on which is stands, was designated as a Scheduled monument in 1970. In 1972, twelve of the structures at Dunnottar were listed. Three buildings were listed at category A as being of "national importance": the keep; the entrance gateway; and Benholm's Lodging. The remaining listings were at category B as being of "regional importance". However, in 2018, the listed status for those buildings was removed as part of Historic Environment Scotland's "Dual Designation 2A Project".

The Hon. Charles Anthony Pearson, the younger son of the 3rd Viscount Cowdray, currently owns and runs Dunnottar Castle which is part of the 210-square-kilometre (81 sq mi) Dunecht Estates. Portions of the 1990 film Hamlet, starring Mel Gibson and Glenn Close, were shot there. In the Disney movie Brave, Dunnottar Castle was chosen for Merida's home.

== Description ==
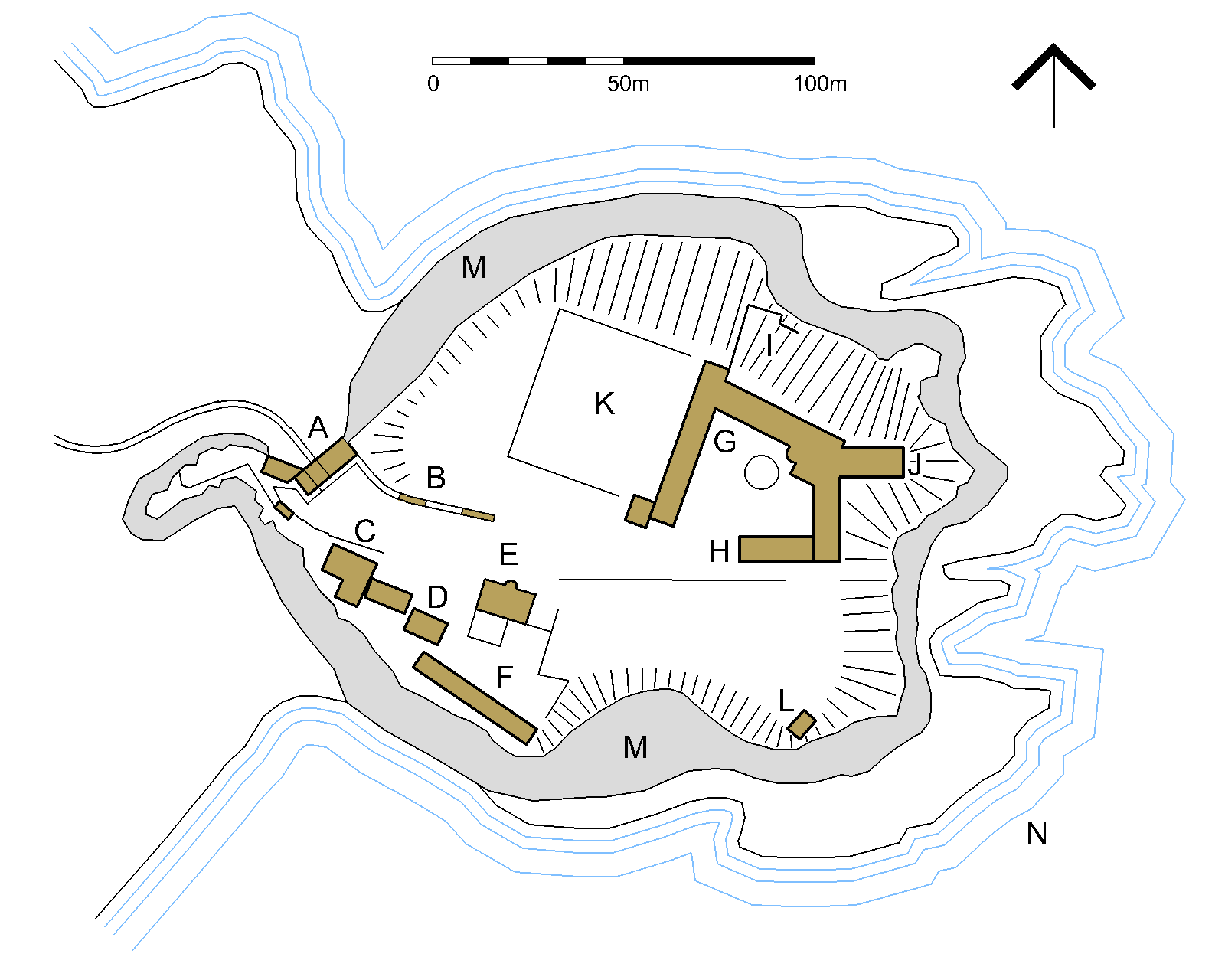
Plan of Dunnottar Castle Key: A Gatehouse and Benholm's Lodging · B Tunnels · C Tower house · D Forge · E Waterton's Lodging · F Stables · G Palace · H Chapel · I Postern gate · J Whigs' Vault · K Bowling green · L Sentry box · M Cliffs · N North Sea

Dunnottar's strategic location allowed its owners to control the coastal terrace between the North Sea cliffs and the hills of the Mounth, 2 1/4 miles (3.6 km) inland, which enabled access to and from the north-east of Scotland. The site is accessed via a steep, 2,600-foot (790 m) footpath (with modern staircases) from a car park on the coastal road, or via a 3-kilometre (2 mi) cliff-top path from Stonehaven.

Dunnottar's several buildings, put up between the 13th and 17th centuries, are arranged across a headland covering around 1.4 hectares (3 1/2 acres). The dominant building, viewed from the land approach, is the 14th-century keep or tower house. The other principal buildings are the gatehouse; the chapel; and the 16th-century "palace" which incorporates the "Whigs' Vault".

=== Defences ===
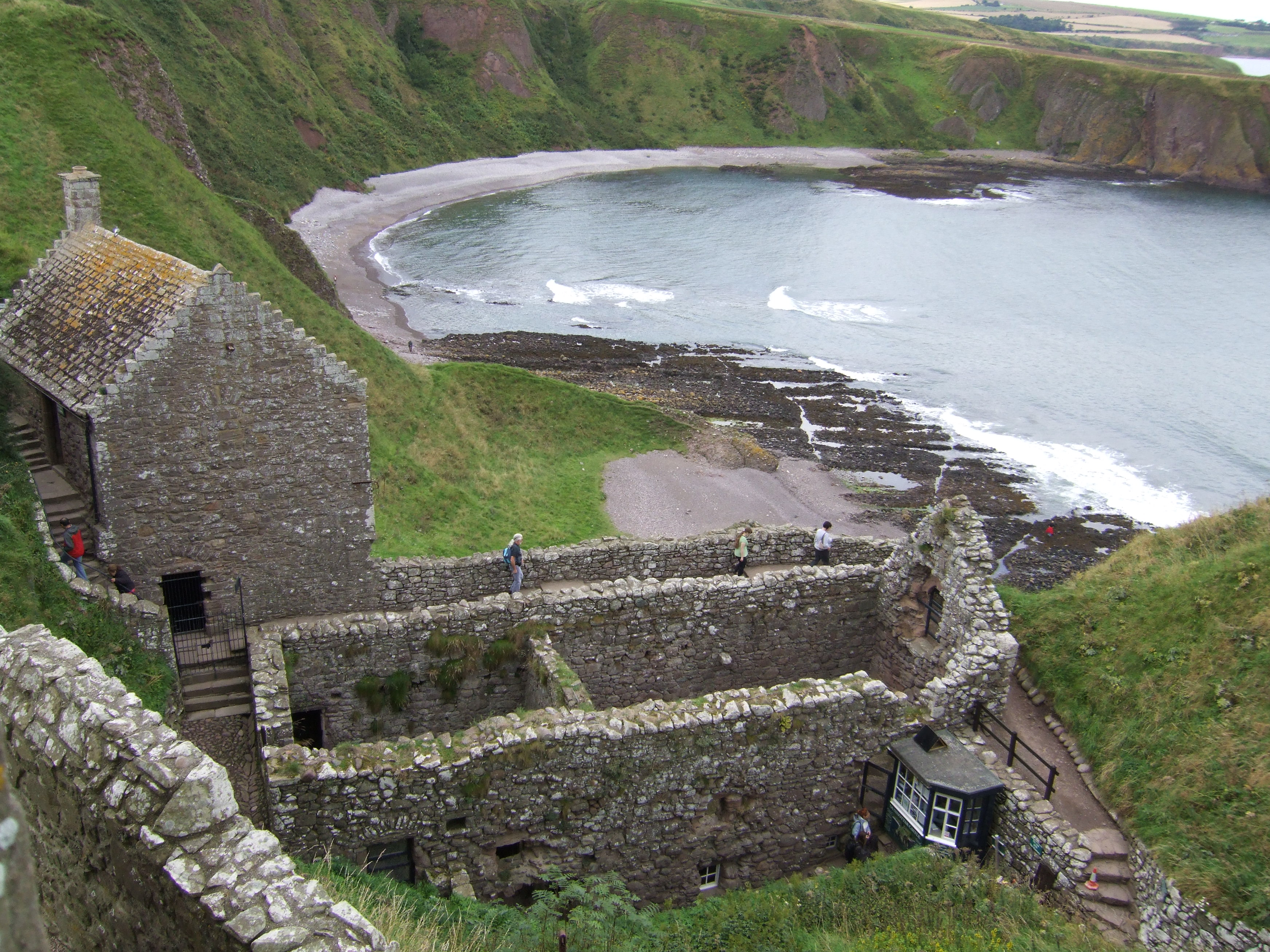
The gatehouse (centre) and Benholm's Lodging (left) seen from within the castle

The approach to the castle is overlooked by outworks on the "Fiddle Head", a promontory on the western side of the headland. The entrance is through the well-defended main gate, set in a curtain wall which entirely blocks a cleft in the rocky cliffs. The gate has a portcullis and has been partly blocked up. Alongside the main gate is the 16th-century Benholm's Lodging, a five-storey building cut into the rock, which incorporated a prison with apartments above. Three tiers of gun ports face outwards from the lower floors of Benholm's Lodging, while inside the main gate, a group of four gun ports face the entrance. The entrance passage then turns sharply to the left, running underground through two tunnels to emerge near the tower house.

Simpson contends that these defences are "without exception the strongest in Scotland", although later writers have doubted the effectiveness of the gun ports. Cruden notes that the alignment of the gun ports in Benholm's Lodging, facing across the approach rather than along, means that they are of limited efficiency. The practicality of the gun ports facing the entrance has also been questioned, though an inventory of 1612 records that four brass cannons were placed here.

A second access to the castle leads up from a rocky cove, the aperture to a marine cave on the northern side of the Dunnottar cliffs into which a small boat could be brought. From here a steep path leads to the well-fortified postern gate on the cliff-top, which in turn offers access to the castle via the Water Gate in the palace. Artillery defences, taking the form of earthworks, surround the north-west corner of the castle, facing inland, and the south-east, facing seaward. A small sentry box or guard house stands by the eastern battery, overlooking the coast.

=== Tower house and surrounding buildings ===
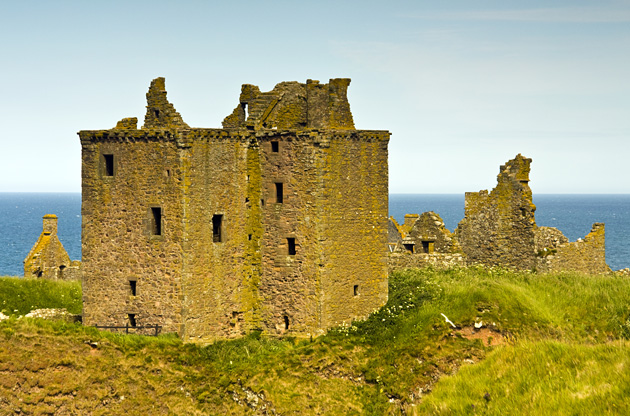
The tower house of Dunnottar, viewed from the west

The late 14th-century tower house has a stone-vaulted basement, and originally had three further storeys and a garret above. Measuring 40 by 36 feet (12 by 11 m), the tower house stood 50 feet (15 m) high to its gable. The principal rooms included a great hall and a private chamber for the lord, with bedrooms upstairs. Beside the tower house is a storehouse, and a blacksmith's forge with a large chimney. A stable block is ranged along the southern edge of the headland. Nearby is Waterton's Lodging, also known as the Priest's House, built around 1574, possibly for the use of William Keith (died 1580), son of the 4th Earl Marischal. This small self-contained house includes a hall and kitchen at ground level, with private chambers above, and has a projecting spiral stair on the north side. It is named for Thomas Forbes of Waterton, an attendant of the 7th Earl.

=== Palace ===
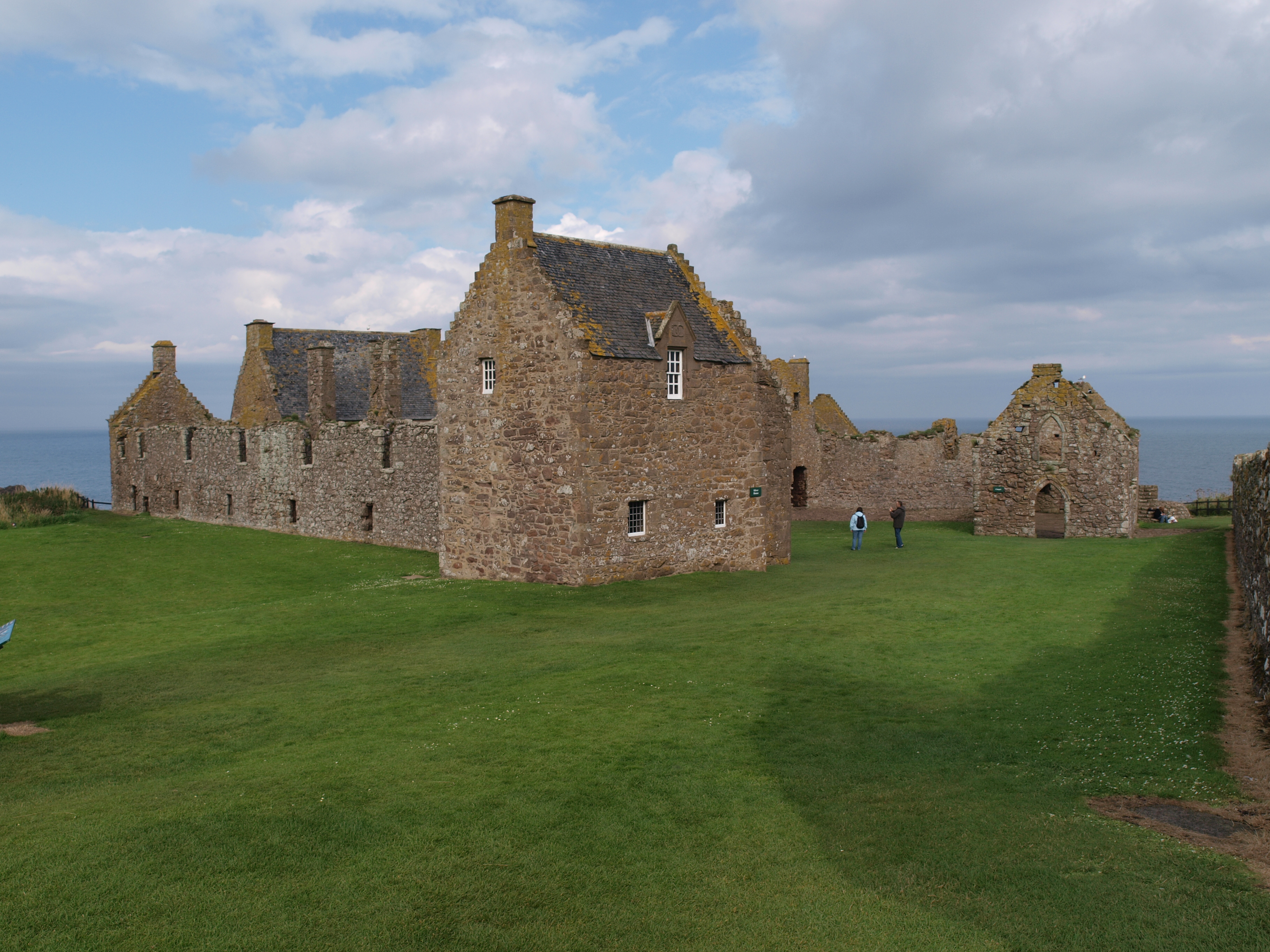
The palace, from the south-west, with the Silver House in the foreground, and the chapel on the right

The palace, to the north-east of the headland, was built in the late 16th century and early to mid-17th century. It comprises three main wings set out around a quadrangle, and for the most part is probably the work of the 5th Earl Marischal who succeeded in 1581. (Note: The order of construction of the palace is debated: Simpson (1966, pp.43–49) interprets the west range as the earliest (possibly before 1580), followed by the north and east ranges together, with the north-east wing added last, in 1645. Cruden follows Simpson, though McKean (2004, pp.173–174) states that the north-east wing is contemporary with the east range, and that the north range is later. Geddes (2001, pp.25–27) suggests that the palace was built from east to west.) It provided extensive and comfortable accommodation to replace the rooms in the tower house. In its long, low design it has been compared to contemporary English buildings, in contrast to the Scottish tradition of taller towers still prevalent in the 16th century.

Seven identical lodgings are arranged along the west range, each opening onto the quadrangle and including windows and fireplaces. Above the lodgings of the west range comprised a 120-foot (37 m) gallery. Now roofless, the gallery originally had an elaborate oak ceiling, and on display was a Roman tablet taken from the Antonine Wall. (Note: The tablet is now in the Hunterian Museum, Glasgow. Simpson (1966), p. 43.) At the north end of the gallery was a drawing room linked to the north range. The gallery could also be accessed from the Silver House to the south, which incorporated a broad stairway with a treasury above.

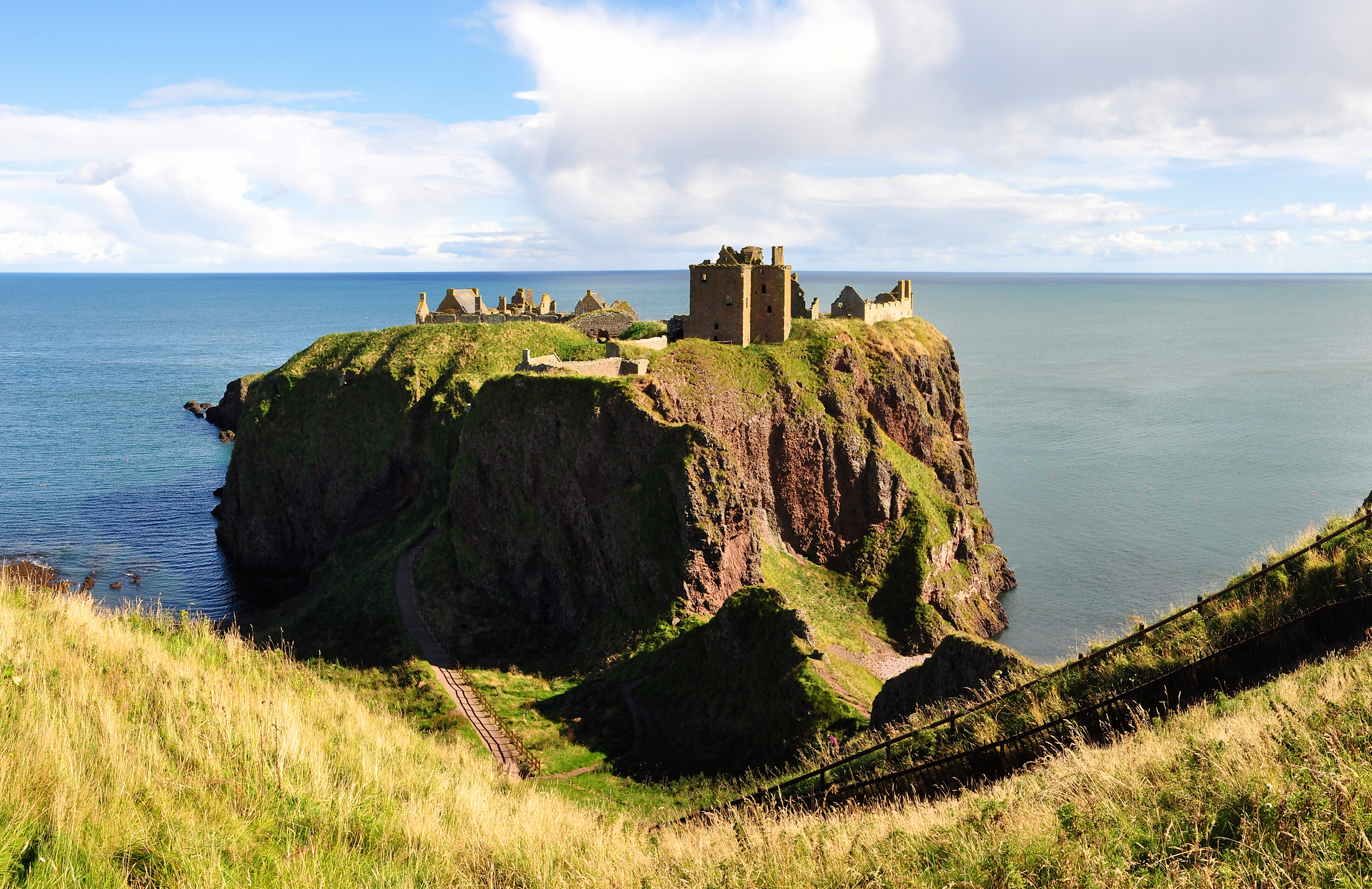
Dunnottar castle viewed from above the entry path

The basement of the north range incorporates kitchens and stores, with a dining room and great chamber above. At ground floor level is the Water Gate, between the north and west ranges, which gives access to the postern on the northern cliffs. The east and north ranges are linked via a rectangular stair. The east range has a larder, brewhouse and bakery at ground level, with a suite of apartments for the countess above. A north-east wing contains the Earl's apartments, and includes the "King's Bedroom" in which Charles II stayed. In this room is a carved stone inscribed with the arms of the 7th Earl and his wife, and the date 1645. Below these rooms is the Whigs' Vault, a cellar measuring 52 by 15 ft (15.8 by 4.6 m). This cellar, in which the Covenanters were held in 1685, has a large eastern window, as well as a lower vault accessed via a trapdoor in the floor. Of the chambers in the palace, only the dining room and the Silver House remain roofed, having been restored in the 1920s.

The central area contains a circular cistern or fish pond, 50 ft (15 m) across and 25 ft (7.6 m) deep, and a bowling green is located to the west. At the south-east corner of the quadrangle is the chapel, consecrated in 1276 and largely rebuilt in the 16th century. Medieval walling and two 13th-century windows remain, and there is a graveyard to the south.

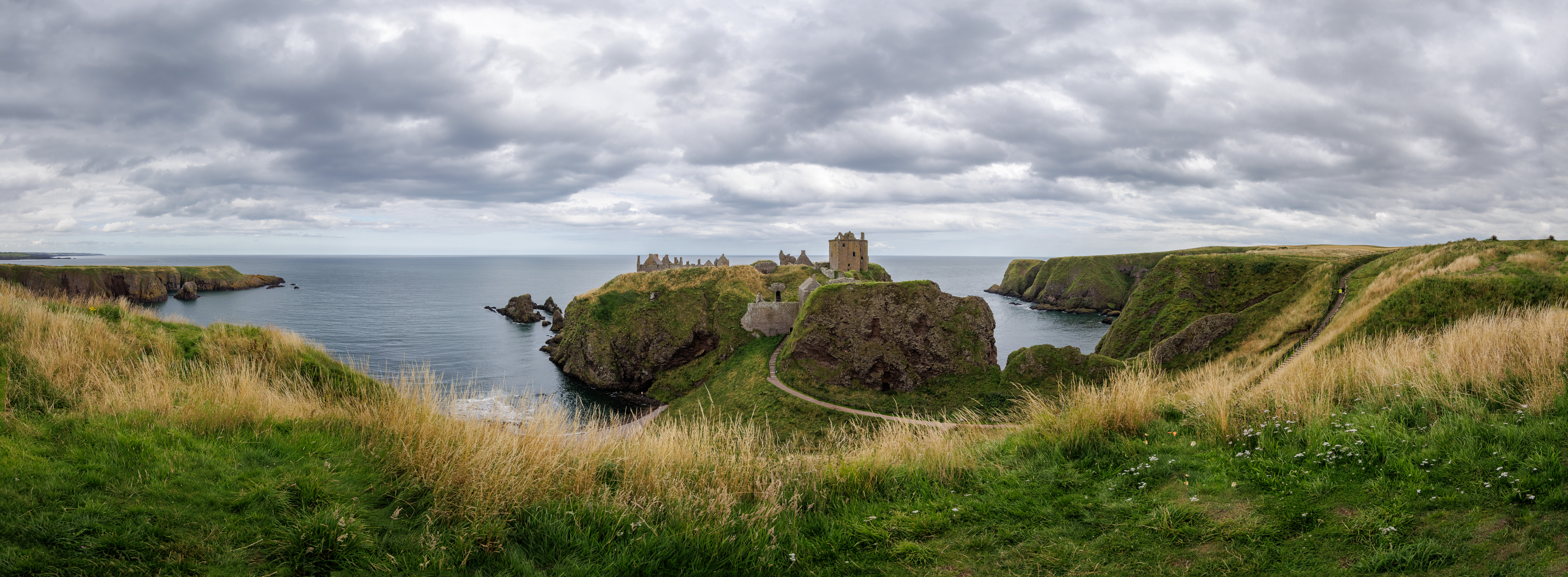
Dunnottar Castle

== See also ==
- Dunnottar Parish Church
