= Lord Falconer of Halkerton =

Arms of Keith, Lord Falconer of Halkerton

The title Lord Falconer of Halkerton is a dormant title in the peerage of Scotland, created on 20 December 1646 for Sir Alexander Falconer, Lord of Session, with remainder to his heirs-male whatsoever. King Charles I granted Sir Alexander a yearly pension of £200 with the title, for his ability, integrity, and affection for administration of Justice.

David Hume's mother was a great-granddaughter of a brother of Sir Alexander Falconer, 1st Lord Falconer of Halkerton.

In 1778, the 7th Lord inherited the Earldom of Kintore, and the two titles remained linked until 1966. The lordship then became vacant with the death of Arthur George Keith-Falconer, 12th Lord Falconer of Halkerton and 10th Earl of Kintore, although the earldom of Kintore continued in the female line.

Peter Serrel Falconer (died 2003), an architect, was the presumed heir to the feudal barony (1206) and Lordship (1646) of Halkerton, and had three sons (Thomas, Richard and William), but did not pursue the claim.

== Lords Falconer of Halkerton (1646) ==
Descendants survey pedigree graph of the "Lords Falconer of Halkerton". The yellow boxes below his Lordship's name, shows the period during which the title: "Lord Falconer of Halkerton" was owned. (click picture to enlarge)

1. Sir Alexander Falconer, 1st Lord Falconer of Halkerton (1595–1671)
2. Alexander Falconer, 2nd Lord Falconer of Halkerton (1620–1684)
3. David Falconer, 3rd Lord Falconer of Halkerton (1668–1724)
4. David Falconer, 4th Lord Falconer of Halkerton (1681—1751), grandson of the brother of the first lord, married Lady Katharine Margaret Keith (daughter of William Keith, 2nd Earl of Kintore)
5. Alexander Falconer, 5th Lord Falconer of Halkerton (1707–1762)
6. William Falconer, 6th Lord Falconer of Halkerton (1712–1776), succeeded his brother Alexander Falconer, who died childless
7. Anthony Adrian Keith-Falconer, 7th Lord Falconer of Halkerton (1742–1804), Earl of Kintore, became 5th Earl of Kintore in 1778
8. William Keith-Falconer, 8th Lord Falconer of Halkerton (1766–1812), 6th Earl of Kintore
9. Anthony Adrian Keith-Falconer, 9th Lord Falconer of Halkerton (1794–1844), 7th Earl of Kintore
10. Francis Alexander Keith-Falconer, 10th Lord Falconer of Halkerton (1828–1880), 8th Earl of Kintore
11. Algernon Hawkins Thomand Keith-Falconer, 11th Lord Falconer of Halkerton (1852–1930), 9th Earl of Kintore
12. Arthur George Keith-Falconer, 12th Lord Falconer of Halkerton (1879–1966), 10th Earl of Kintore.

With the death of Arthur George Keith-Falconer, 12th Lord of Halkerton, the title "Lord Falconer of Halkerton" became dormant.
This means that an heir is believed to be alive, but it is uncertain who the heir is.

== See also ==
- Falconer baronets
