= Caskieben =

Scottish estate

- Part of Keith Hall
- Aberdeenshire, Scotland
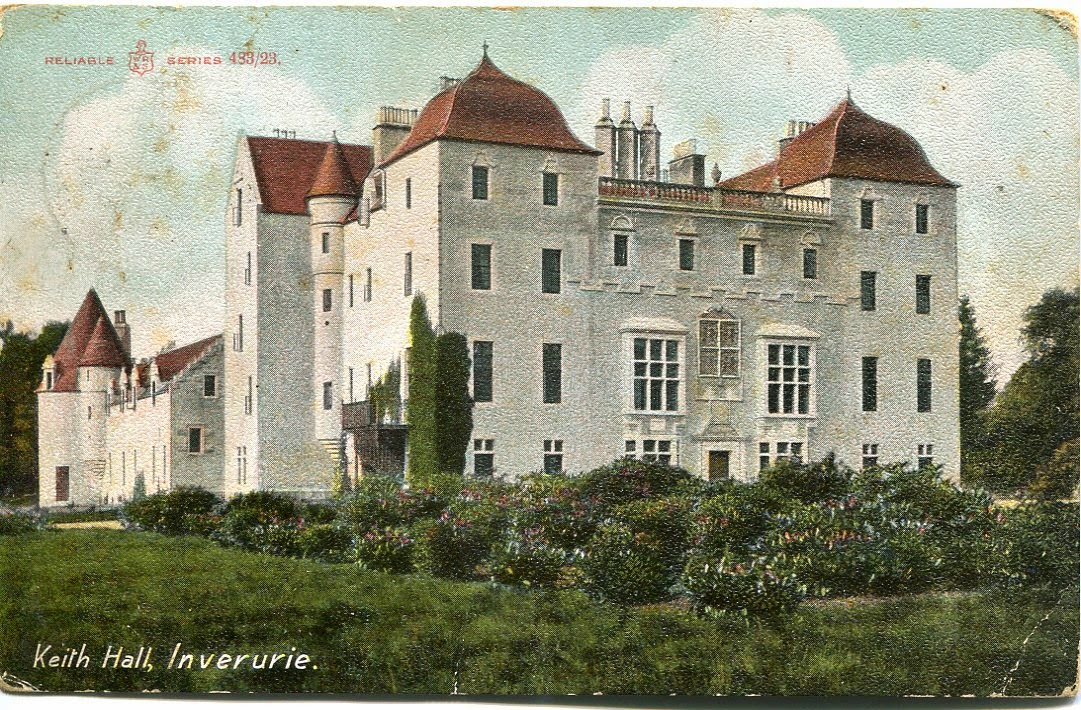
- Colorized photograph of Keith Hall (Caskieben) near Inverurie, Scotland. Postcard dated 30 June 1909.

Site information
- Type: fortalice
- Owner: James Keith, 14th Earl of Kintore
- Controlled by: Earl of Kintore
- Condition: renovated

Location
- Coordinates: 57.28203425°N 2.35334179°W
- Grid reference: grid reference NJ 7879 2135

Site history
- Built: 1224
- Built by: Garvioch
- Materials: Stone
- Demolished: 1662
- Battles/wars: Battle of Inverurie (1308)

Scheduled monument
- Official name: Caskieben moat, moated site and symbol stone
- Type: Crosses and carved stones: symbol stone, Secular: homestead moat
- Designated: 16 November 1923
- Reference no.: SM75

Inventory of Gardens and Designed Landscapes in Scotland
- Official name: Keith Hall
- Designated: 1 July 1987
- Reference no.: GDL00232

Caskieben (/kæskiːˈbɛn/ kahs-KEE-ben; Scottish Gaelic: Gasach beinn "Wooded Hill", later Keith Hall) was a palisaded tower built by the Garviach family during the 12th-century Norman expansion into Scotland. It stood on a low, circular mound surrounded by a 2 metre deep, 15 metre wide moat. The site of the castle became the current Keith Hall, a manor house primarily built and extended between the 17th and 19th centuries.

== History ==
About 1224 Norman de Leslie received the lands of Caskieben and was doubtless the builder of the Anglo-Norman castle which superseded the old tower (NJ72SE 40). The castle of Caskieben that was enlarged after 1662 by the addition of a Renaissance mansion in front, and renamed Keith Hall, was, however, a fine example of the Z-plan castle, a style which probably originated in the district. Mither Tap has an astronomical alignment with Caskieben, the hill being due west. Dr. Arthur Johnston said "the hill of Benochie, a conical elevation about eight miles distant, casts its shadow over Caskieben at the periods of the equinox." This earlier wooden tower was superseded nearby by a 13th-century stone castle also named Caskieben at first, but later renamed Keith Hall. Nothing now remains of a structure, but the mound and moat are still visible.

=== Keith Hall ===
Keith Hall is situated on a sloping escarpment above the fertile valley of the River Urie just to the north of its junction with the River Don in the Aberdeenshire lowlands and is roughly 1-mile (1.6 km) east of Inverurie, and 15-mile (24 km) north-west of Aberdeen. The landscape at Keith Hall was designed in 1794 by Thomas White Sr. and includes informal parkland. Today, the grounds features late-19th- and early-20th-century ornamental trees and shrubs situated around a lake with a terraced walled garden.

Keith Hall incorporates the original Caskieben Castle which was a Z-plan tower. Between 1696 and 1698, John Keith, 1st Earl of Kintore added wings and distinctive ogee capped towers to create a small mansion. Later, plans for alterations were prepared by William Adam but were not executed. In 1788, John Paterson made repairs to the structure for the 5th Earl of Kintore. Between 1806 and 1812, architect John Smith designed alterations for the residence for the 6th Earl of Kintore. The 8th Earl of Kintore commissioned David Bryce to create additional plans for alterations in 1851, however, they were likely not executed as William Ramage of Aberdeen was paid for work there in 1854.

Between 1895 and 1914, further alterations and major additions were commissioned by the 9th Earl of Kintore. Drawings for some of this work were prepared by Sydney Mitchell and James Garve & Sons of Aberdeen. Between 1938 and 1941, the interior was refurbished for the 10th Earl of Kintore and his wife Helena, the American heiress who was the former wife of William Montagu, 9th Duke of Manchester. In 1984, the building was completely restored and divided into eight flats and six houses.
