= Anthony Keith-Falconer =

Anthony Keith-Falconer may refer to:

- Anthony Keith-Falconer, 5th Earl of Kintore (c. 1742–1804), Dutch-Scottish aristocrat
- Anthony Keith-Falconer, 7th Earl of Kintore (1794–1844), Scottish aristocrat
