= William Keith-Falconer, 6th Earl of Kintore =

Scottish aristocrat

The Right Honourable The Earl of Kintore
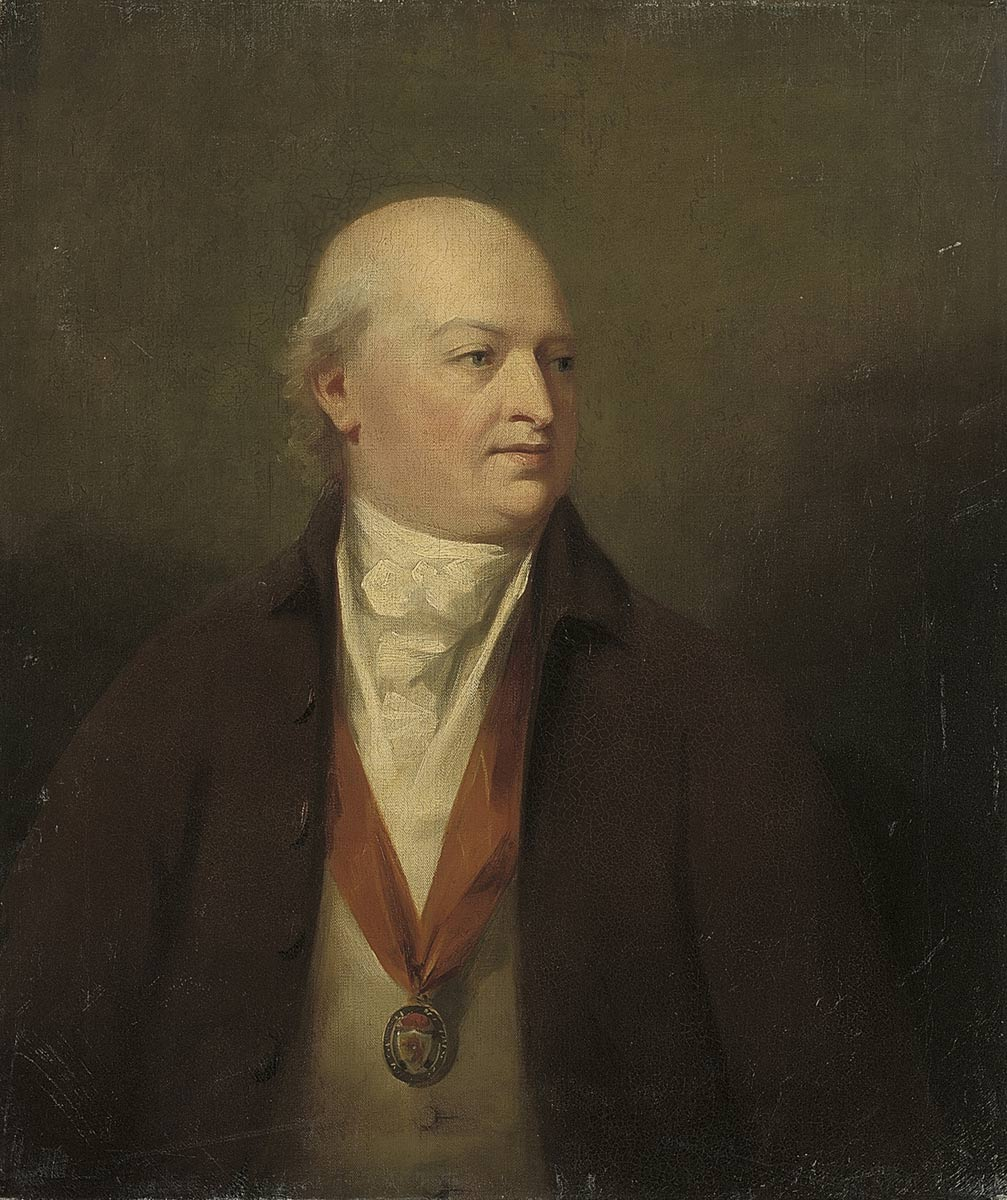
- Portrait of Lord Kintore by Henry Raeburn

Personal details
- Born: William Keith-Falconer; 11 December 1766
- Died: 6 October 1812 (aged 45)
- Spouse: Maria Bannerman (m. 1793)
- Relations: William Falconer, 6th Lord Falconer of Halkerton (grandfather)
- Children: 3, including Anthony
- Parent(s): Anthony Keith-Falconer, 5th Earl of Kintore; Christina Elizabeth Sichterman

Military service
- Branch/service: 2nd Dragoons (Royal Scots Greys)

William Keith-Falconer, 6th Earl of Kintore (11 December 1766 – 6 October 1812), was a Dutch-Scottish aristocrat.

== Early life ==
Lord Kintore was born on 11 December 1766. He was the only son amongst seven daughters born to a Dutch born Scotsman Anthony Keith-Falconer, 5th Earl of Kintore and his Dutch wife, Christina Elizabeth Sichterman (d. 1809). His seven younger sisters, none of whom married, were Lady Sibella, Lady Maria, Lady Catherine, Lady Francina, Hon. Jean (who died in infancy), Lady Christiana, and Hon. Helen Keith-Falconer (who also died in infancy).

His paternal grandparents were William Falconer, 6th Lord Falconer of Halkerton, a colonel in the Dutch Army (who was the son of David Falconer, 4th Lord Falconer of Halkerton and the former Lady Catherine Margaret Keith, the daughter of William Keith, 2nd Earl of Kintore) and the former Rembertina Maria Idiking (the daughter of Burgomaster Idiking of Groningen). His mother was a daughter of Jan Albert Sichterman of Groningen, the Intendant General of the Dutch Settlements in the East Indies and Director and Fiscal of Bengal in 1734.

== Career ==
He gained the rank of Officer in the 2nd Dragoons (Royal Scots Greys).

Upon the death of his father on 30 August 1804, he succeeded as the 6th Earl of Kintore, 6th Lord Keith of Inverurie and Keith Hall, and 8th Lord Falconer of Halkerton, all in the Peerage of Scotland (the first two titles were created in 1677 and the latter was created in 1647).

== Personal life ==
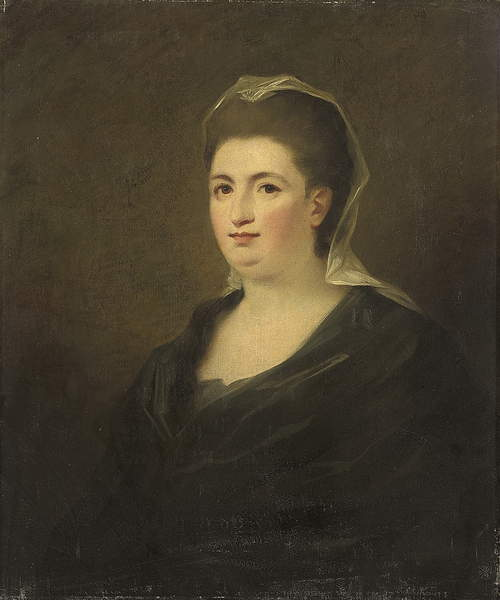
Portrait of Maria, Countess of Kintore by Henry Raeburn

On 18 June 1793, Keith-Falconer was married to Maria Bannerman (c. 1770–1826), a daughter of Sir Alexander Bannerman, 6th Baronet and the former Mary Gordon (a daughter of Sir James Gordon of Banchory). Together, they were the parents of:

- Anthony Adrian Keith-Falconer, 7th Earl of Kintore (1794–1844), who married twice, had four children with his second wife, and several natural born children with his mistress.
- Lady Maria Keith-Falconer (1795–1864), who did not marry.
- Hon. William Keith-Falconer (1799–1846), a Capt. of the Royal Navy who married Louisa Grant (d. 1862), a daughter of William Grant of Congalton, in 1830.

Lord Kintore died on 6 October 1812. Lady Kintore died on 30 June 1826. He was succeeded by his eldest son Anthony.

Peerage of Scotland
Preceded by Anthony Adrian Keith-Falconer	Earl of Kintore; 1804–1812	Succeeded by Anthony Adrian Keith-Falconer
