= Alexander Falconer =

Alexander Falconer may refer to:

- Alex Falconer (Scottish politician), Scottish politician
- Alex Falconer (American politician), American politician from Minnesota
- Sir Alexander Falconer, 1st Lord Falconer of Halkerton (1595–1671), Lord Falconer of Halkerton
- Alexander Falconer, 2nd Lord Falconer of Halkerton (1620–1684), Lord Falconer of Halkerton
- Alexander Falconer, 4th Lord Falconer of Halkerton (died 1727), Lord Falconer of Halkerton
- Alexander Falconer, 6th Lord Falconer of Halkerton (1707–1762), Lord Falconer of Halkerton
