= Anthony Keith-Falconer, 5th Earl of Kintore =

The Right Honourable The Earl of Kintore

Lord Lieutenant of Kincardineshire
- In office 17 March 1794 – 30 August 1804
- Preceded by: Inaugural holder
- Succeeded by: The Viscount of Arbuthnott

Personal details
- Born: Antony Adriaan Falconer c. 1742 Groningen, Netherlands
- Died: 30 August 1804 (aged 61–62)
- Spouse: Christina Elizabeth Sichterman (m. 1766)
- Relations: Anthony Keith-Falconer, 7th Earl of Kintore (grandson)
- Children: 8, including William
- Parent(s): William Falconer, 6th Lord Falconer of Halkerton; Rembertina Maria Idiking

Anthony Adrian Keith-Falconer, 5th Earl of Kintore (c. 1742 – 30 August 1804), who was known as the 7th Lord Falconer of Halkerton, between 1776 and 1778, was a Dutch-Scottish aristocrat.

== Early life ==
He was born in Groningen, the Netherlands around 1742 and grew up in a house on Oosterstraat in Groningen. He was the eldest surviving son of William Falconer, 6th Lord Falconer of Halkerton, a colonel in the Dutch Army, and Rembertina Maria Idiking (the daughter of Burgomaster Idiking of Groningen). His paternal grandparents were David Falconer, 4th Lord Falconer of Halkerton and the former Lady Catherine Margaret Keith (the daughter of William Keith, 2nd Earl of Kintore).

== Career ==
Upon the death of his father on 12 December 1776, he succeeded as 7th Lord Falconer of Halkerton. In 1761, on the death of William Keith, 4th Earl of Kintore, the earldom should have passed under the terms of the 1694 regrant to Lord Kintore's cousin George Keith, 10th and last Earl Marischal, as heir male of George Keith, 8th Earl Marischal (the elder brother of John Keith, 1st Earl of Kintore); however, he had been attainted for his part in the 1715 rising and so the earldom of Kintore remained suspended until the death of the 10th Earl Marischal on 28 May 1778, (Note: The titles and estates of George Keith, 10th Earl Marischal had been forfeited in 1715, however, the 10th Earl took refuge in Prussia, where he was received with distinction, and was employed as Frederick the Great's Ambassador at Madrid. While there, he had "an opportunity of performing signal service to the English Government, and obtained his pardon, together with an act of Parliament enabling him to inherit and real or personal estates notwithstanding his attainder, but without and provision for the inheritance of titles of honour." Therefore, after the 10th Earl Marischal's death, the Kintore title accordingly devolved on the heir female of the 1st Earl of Kintore.) when it was inherited by Anthony, the heir general of the 4th Earl of Kintore, who changed his surname to Keith-Falconer and became the 5th Earl of Kintore. He inherited the estate of Kintore, Hallforest Castle which had been given to the family by King Robert the Bruce, and Keith Hall.

From 1794 to 1804, he served as Lord Lieutenant of Kincardineshire, the British monarch's personal representative in the lieutenancy area of the United Kingdom. After his death, he was succeeded by John Arbuthnott, 8th Viscount of Arbuthnott.

== Personal life ==
Around 1766, he was married to Christina Elizabeth Sichterman (d. 1809), a daughter of Jan Albert Sichterman of Groningen, the Intendant General of the Dutch Settlements in the East Indies and Director and Fiscal of Bengal in 1734. Together, they were the parents of one son and seven daughters:

- William Keith-Falconer, 6th Earl of Kintore (1766–1812), who married Maria Bannerman, a daughter of Sir Alexander Bannerman, 6th Baronet and Mary Gordon (a daughter of Sir James Gordon) in 1793.
- Lady Sibella Keith-Falconer (1768–1792).
- Lady Maria Remembertina Keith-Falconer (1769–1851).
- Lady Catherine Margaret Keith-Falconer (1770–1849).
- Lady Francina Constantia Keith-Falconer (1771–1779).
- Hon. Jean Keith-Falconer (b. 1772), who died in infancy.
- Lady Christian Elizabeth Keith-Falconer (1774–1826).
- Hon. Helen Keith-Falconer (b. 1777), who died in infancy.

Lord Kintore died on 30 August 1804. His widow died nearly five years later on 26 March 1809.

Honorary titles
Preceded by Inaugural holder	Lord Lieutenant of Kincardineshire; 1805–1804	Succeeded by The Viscount of Arbuthnott
Peerage of Scotland
Preceded by William Keith	Earl of Kintore; 1778–1804	Succeeded by William Keith-Falconer
Preceded by William Falconer	Lord Falconer of Halkerton; 1776–1804	Succeeded by William Keith-Falconer
