= Douwe Mout van der Meer =

Dutch ship captain (1705–1775)

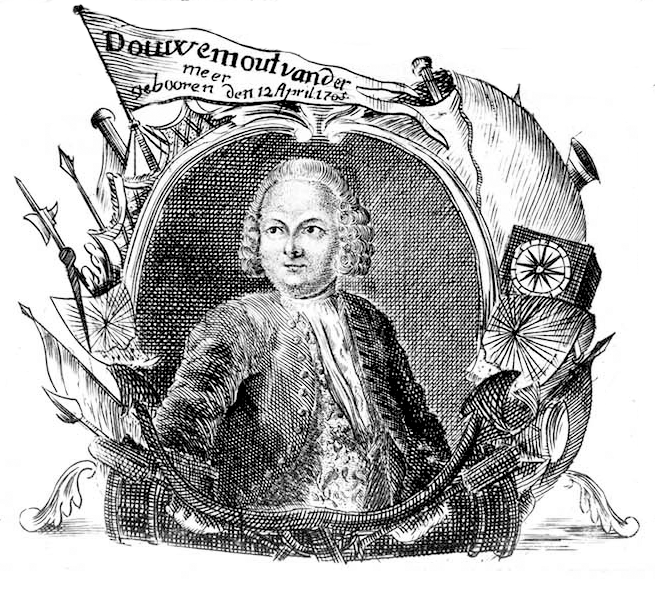
Captain Douwe Mout

Douwe Jansz Mout van der Meer (April 12, 1705 – 1775) was a Dutch ship captain who served with the Dutch East India Company (Dutch: Verenigde Oostindische Compagnie). He is most famous for travelling with the rhinoceros, Clara, which he took on a tour across Europe.

== Life ==
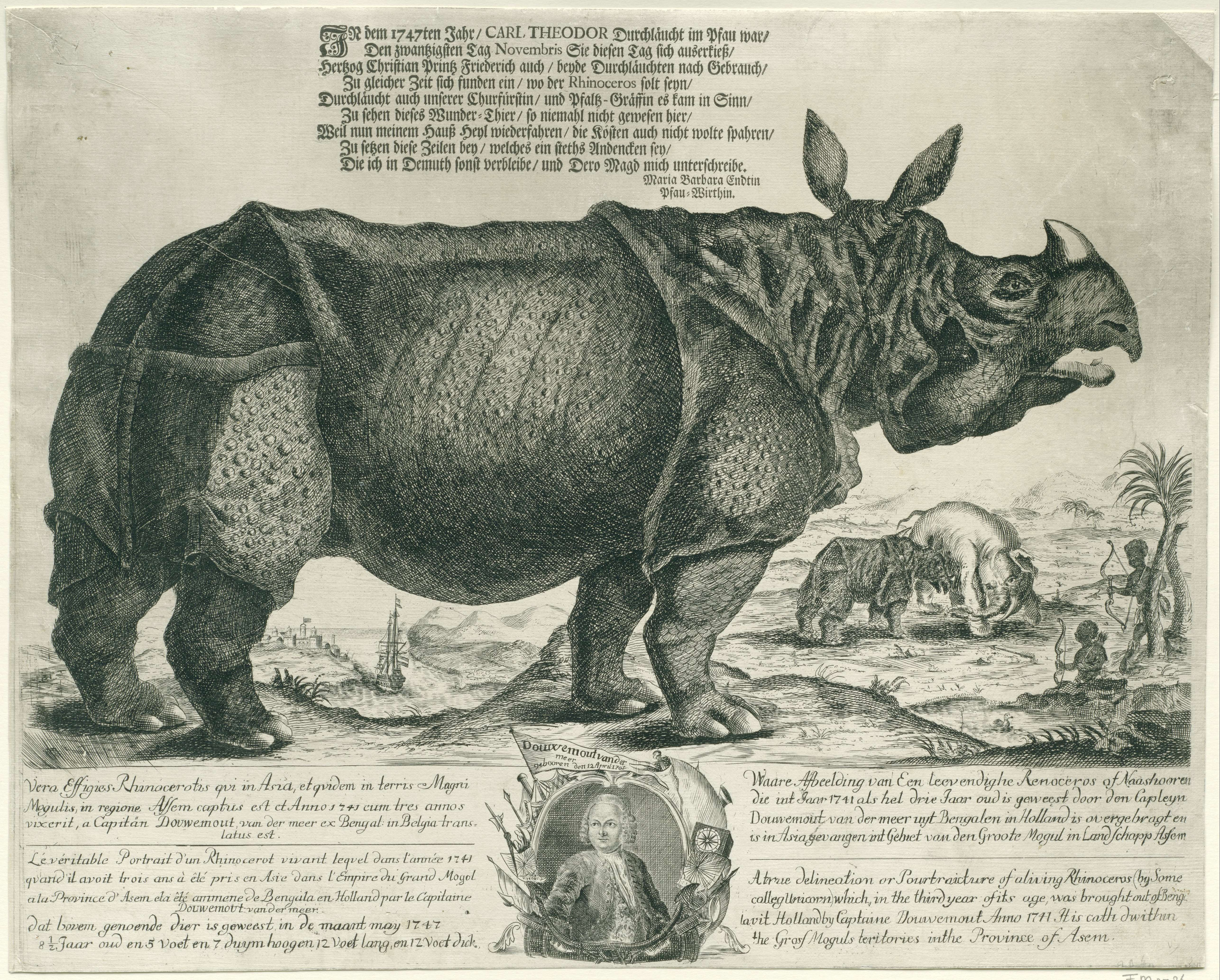
1747 advertisement

Douwe Jansz Mout was born in Leiden into a family of sailors and ship captains. He joined the Verenigde Oostindische Compagnie and served as a third mate on the Dornik to the East Indies in 1726. He returned in 1731 aboard the Adrichem and in 1739 he was first mate on the Phoenix. He went on the Horssen under Jan Luders to Bengal and following the death of Luders he became captain. He served as captain of the Knappenhof in 1740 on its return from Bengal and aboard the ship he carried the rhinoceros Clara which he had obtained from Jan Albert Sichterman. Reaching the Netherlands, he exhibited Clara in Leiden and this attracted large crowds. He served aboard the Goldschalxoord to Batavia in 1742 and returning in 1744 he resigned. He then had a special carriage made to transport Clara and went on a grand tour across Europe. Clara and van der Meer travelled between 1746 and 1758 through Germany, Austria, France, Italy, and Eastern Europe. The end came in England with Clara's death. He met numerous kings and earned a great deal of money, investing in publicity, and earning from the sale of memorabilia. Little is known of his life after 1758. He was married to Elizabeth Snel, and their daughter was baptized in 1751.
