= David Falconer, 4th Lord Falconer of Halkerton =

English aristocrat

David Falconer, 4th Lord of Halkerton
- Born: 27 May 1681; Edinburgh, Scotland
- Died: 24 September 1751 (aged 70); Marykirk, Aberdeenshire, Scotland
- Spouse: Catherine Keith (m. 1703)
- Children: 10, including William
- Relatives: Anthony Keith-Falconer (grandson)

David Falconer, 4th Lord of Halkerton (27 May 1681 – 24 September 1751) was a Scottish peer. He held the title from 1724 to 1751.

== Early life ==
Descendants survey pedigree graph of the "Lords Falconer of Halkerton".

Falconer was born on 27 May 1681 in Edinburgh. He was the son of Sir David Falconer of Newton and Mary Norvell. He was a grandson of Sir David Falconer and the former Margaret Hepburn. His grandfather was the brother of the Sir Alexander Falconer the first Lord Falconer of Halkerton.

== Career ==
In 1724, he succeeded David Falconer (the grandson of Sir Alexander Falconer, 1st Lord Falconer of Halkerton, his grandfather's brother) as the 4th Lord Falconer of Halkerton in the Peerage of Scotland.

== Personal life ==
On 23 December 1703, David Falconer married Lady Catherine Margaret Keith in Keith Hall in Marykirk. She was the daughter of William Keith, 2nd Earl of Kintore. Together, they were the parents of:

- Alexander Falconer, 5th Lord Falconer of Halkerton (b. c. 1707), who married Frances Mackworth (1731–1814), a daughter of Herbert Mackworth and Lady Jane Noel (daughter of Edward Noel, 1st Earl of Gainsborough) in 1757. After his death she married Anthony Browne, 7th Viscount Montagu in 1765.
- William Falconer, 6th Lord Falconer of Halkerton (b. c. 1712), who married Rembertina Maria van Iddekinge (d. 1779), a daughter of Burgomaster Pieter Rembt van Iddekinge of Groningen, Netherlands.
- Hon. David Falconer (b. c. 1716), who married Ms. Lamplugh of co. Cumberland.
- Hon. Catherine Falconer (1717–1748).
- Hon. John Falconer of Jamaica (b. 1718).
- Hon. Jean Falconer (1719–1797), who married James Falconer of Monkton and Balnakettle (d. 1779).
- Hon. James Melvin Falconer of Monkton (1750–1779).
- Hon. Mary Falconer (1721–1775).
- Hon. George Falconer of Phesdo (c. 1722–1780), a Capt. of the Royal Navy who married Hannah (née Ivie) Hardy (widow of Lt. Hardy).
- Hon. Marjory "May" Falconer (1723–1787), who married George Norvell of Boghall and Deans in 1759.

David died on 24 September 1751 in Inglismaldie at age 70. His widow, Lady Katharine died on 1 March 1762 in Edinburgh at age 71.

=== Descendants ===
Through his second son William, he was the grandfather of Anthony Adrian Keith-Falconer, 7th Lord Falconer of Halkerton, who became the 5th Earl of Kintore in 1778.
