= Knight Marischal =

The office of Knight Marischal was first created for the Scottish coronation of Charles I in 1633, at Scone. Unlike the separate office of Marischal, the office of Knight Marischal is not heritable, and has continued to be filled up to the death of the 11th Duke of Hamilton in 1863. The office is vacant but has not been abolished.

At the time of the Jacobite rising of 1715, the Knight Marischal was a Keith, and with his kinsman George, the 10th Earl Marischal, was in rebellion. However, as the office is non-heritable, it could not be forfeited, although the holder was stripped of office.

The salary attached to the post was £400 in 1660. The Public Offices (Scotland) Act 1817 provided that no person thereafter appointed as Knight Marshall should receive a salary.

== Knights Marischal ==
- 1660–1714: John Keith, 1st Earl of Kintore
- 1714–1715: William Keith, 2nd Earl of Kintore
- 1718–1732: Charles Hamilton, Lord Binning
- 1733–1758: John Keith, 3rd Earl of Kintore
- 1758: James Erskine, Lord Barjarg
- 1785: Sir Robert Laurie, Bt
- 1805: William Hay, 17th Earl of Erroll
- 1819–1832: Alexander Keith, later Sir Alexander
- 1832–1846: William George Hay, 18th Earl of Erroll
- 1846–1863: William Hamilton, 11th Duke of Hamilton
