= Falconer baronets =

Extinct baronetcy in the Baronetage of Nova Scotia

The Falconer Baronetcy, of Glenfarquhar, was created in the Baronetage of Nova Scotia on 20 March 1670 for Alexander Falconer, nephew of Sir Alexander Falconer, 1st Lord Falconer of Halkerton. The title became extinct on the death of the second Baronet on 17 March 1727. According to some reports, the second Baronet succeeded as the fourth Lord Falconer of Halkerton in 1724.

== Falconer baronets, of Glenfarquhar (1670) ==
- Sir Alexander Falconer, 1st Baronet
- Sir Alexander Falconer, 2nd Baronet (died 1727)
