= Anthony Keith-Falconer, 7th Earl of Kintore =

Scottish aristorcrat

The Right Honourable The Earl of Kintore
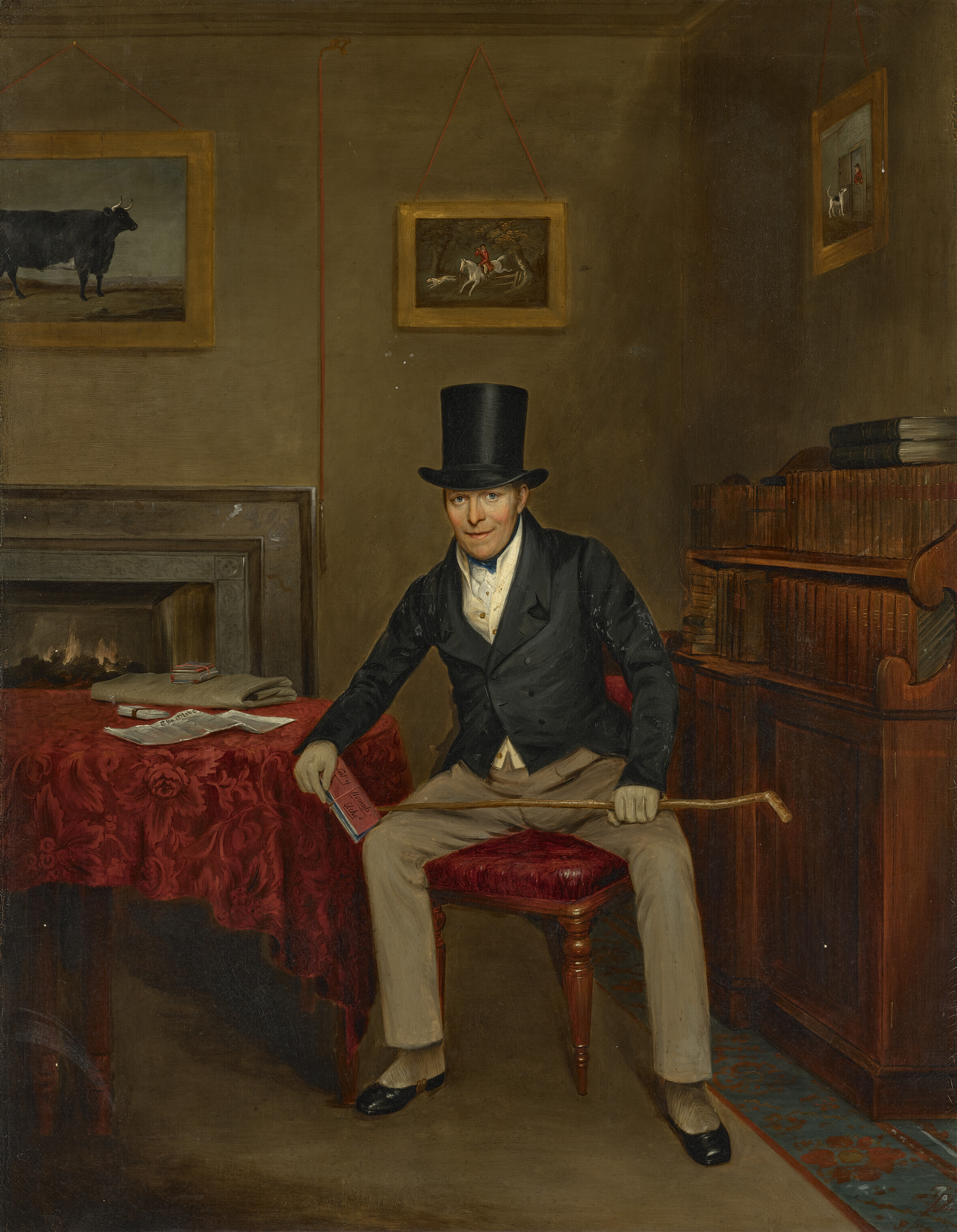

Personal details
- Born: Anthony Keith-Falconer; 20 April 1794
- Died: 11 July 1844 (aged 50)
- Spouse(s): Juliet Renny (m. 1817; died 1819) Louisa Hawkins (m. 1821; div. 1840)
- Relations: Sir Alexander Bannerman, Bt (grandfather); Sir Alexander Bannerman, Bt (cousin)
- Children: Francis Keith-Falconer, 8th Earl of Kintore
- Parent(s): William Keith-Falconer, 6th Earl of Kintore; Maria Bannerman
- Education: St Mary Hall, Oxford

Anthony Keith-Falconer, 7th Earl of Kintore, Chief of Clan Keith (20 April 1794 – 11 July 1844), was a Scottish aristocrat.

== Early life ==
Keith-Falconer was born on 20 April 1794. He was the son of William Keith-Falconer, 6th Earl of Kintore and the former Maria Bannerman. His elder sister was Lady Maria Keith-Falconer and his younger brother was Capt. Hon. William Keith-Falconer of the Royal Navy (who married Louisa Grant, a daughter of William Grant of Congalton).

His paternal grandparents were Anthony Keith-Falconer, 5th Earl of Kintore and the former Christina Elizabeth Sichterman (daughter of Jan Albert Sichterman of Groningen, the Netherlands, Intendant General of the Dutch Settlements in the East Indies and Director and Fiscal of Bengal). His maternal grandparents were Sir Alexander Bannerman, 6th Baronet and the former Mary Gordon (a daughter of Sir James Gordon of Banchory).

After being a pupil at Sparsholt in Berkshire, Lord Kintore attended St Mary Hall, Oxford.

== Career ==
Upon the death of his father on 6 October 1812, he succeeded as the 7th Earl of Kintore and 7th Lord Keith of Inverurie and Keith Hall. On 5 July 1838, he was created Baron Kintore, of Kintore in the County of Aberdeen in the Peerage of the United Kingdom.

After inheriting Keith Hall, the family seat in Aberdeenshire, he began keeping hounds there. Lord Kintore was master of the Old Berkshire Hunt from 1826 to 1830 and was known as "a rider bold to rashness, greedy for fences; and he was celebrated as a boon table companion." He was succeeded as master of the Hunt by Henry Reynolds-Moreton, later the 2nd Earl of Dulcie (who established the Vale of White Horse Hunt). After he "gave up the country," he returned to Keith Hall where he took to farming "on a large scale."

== Personal life ==
On 14 June 1817, he was married to Juliet Renny, the fourth daughter of Robert Renny. Esq. of Barrowfield. She died two years later on 9 July 1819; they had no children.

On 27 August 1821, Lord Kintore was married to Louisa Hawkins, a daughter of Helen Dempster Burrington and Francis Hawkins, Esq. of Bareilly, Bengal, India. Before she obtained a divorce from him on 3 March 1840, they were the parents of four children:

- Lt. Hon. William Adrian Keith-Falconer, styled Lord Inverurie (1822–1843), who was killed while hunting; he was unmarried.
- Lady Isabella Catherine Keith-Falconer (1824–1870), who married Henry Grant, Esq. of Congalton in 1847.
- Francis Alexander Keith-Falconer, 8th Earl of Kintore (1828–1880), a Major with the 4th Dragoons who married his cousin Louisa Madeleine Hawkins, second daughter of his maternal uncle Francis Hawkins, in 1851.
- Maj. Hon. Charles James Keith-Falconer (1832–1889), the Commissioner of the Inland Revenue from 1874 to 1889 who married Caroline Diana Aldridge, third daughter of Robert Aldridge of St Leonard's Forest, in 1857.

A month after their divorce in 1840, the Countess of Kintore married Dr. B. North Arnold, a son of Rev. C. Arnold, on 2 April 1840, but died a year and a half later on 1 November 1841.

Lord Kintore also fathered several illegitimate children with his mistress, Isabella Smith:

- Mary Keith (b. 1832), who married James Forbes-Leith, JP DL (1828–1875), son of Lt.-Col. James-John Forbes-Leith of Whitehaugh and Williamina Helen Stewart (later the wife of Charles-Louis-Henri-Joseph Le Masson, Comte de Rancé), in 1851.
- Anthony Adrian Keith (1835–1903), who married Hannah Bendle (1839–1906).
- Georgina Keith (1840–1897), who married James Cumine Burnett (1834–1905), a descendant of James Burnett, Lord Monboddo, in 1863.

Lord Kintore, who did not remarry, died on 11 July 1844.

Peerage of Scotland
Preceded by William Keith-Falconer	Earl of Kintore; 1812–1844	Succeeded by Francis Alexander Keith-Falconer
Peerage of the United Kingdom
New creation	Baron Kintore; 1838–1844	Succeeded by Francis Alexander Keith-Falconer
