= William Keith, 2nd Earl of Kintore =

Scottish nobleman

The Right Honourable The Earl of Kintore

Personal details
- Born: William Keith; 1660
- Died: 5 December 1718 (aged 22–23)
- Spouse: Hon. Catherine Murray (m. 1687)
- Relations: William Keith, 6th Earl Marischal (grandfather); Thomas Hamilton, 2nd Earl of Haddington (grandfather)
- Children: John Keith, 3rd Earl of Kintore; William Keith, 4th Earl of Kintore; Lady Catherine Falconer
- Parent(s): John Keith, 1st Earl of Kintore; Lady Margaret Hamilton

William Keith, 2nd Earl of Kintore (1660 – 5 December 1718), was a Scottish nobleman.

== Early life ==
He was the only son born to John Keith, 1st Earl of Kintore and the former Lady Margaret Hamilton. His two sisters were Lady Jean Keith (the wife of Sir William Forbes, 4th Baronet of Monymusk) and Lady Margaret Keith (the wife of Maj. Gavin Hamilton of Raploch).

His paternal grandparents were William Keith, 6th Earl Marischal, and Lady Mary Erskine (the eldest daughter of John Erskine, 19th and de jure 2nd Earl of Mar and, his second wife, Marie Stewart, the daughter of Esmé Stewart, 1st Duke of Lennox). Among his extended family were uncles William Keith, 7th Earl Marischal and George Keith, 8th Earl Marischal and aunts Mary Keith (wife of John, Lord Kinpont), Jean Keith (wife of Alexander, Lord Forbes of Pitsligo, and Isobel Keith (wife of MP Edward Turnor, son of Edward Turnor, Speaker of the House of Commons). His mother was the only child, born posthumously, of Thomas Hamilton, 2nd Earl of Haddington by his second wife Lady Jean Gordon (the third daughter of George Gordon, 2nd Marquess of Huntly and Lady Anne Campbell, herself a daughter of Archibald Campbell, 7th Earl of Argyll).

== Career ==
Beginning in 1714, he was a Knight Marischal of Scotland. Lord Kintore was a Tory and a Jacobite, and took part in the 1715 rising fighting at the Battle of Sheriffmuir. The rising, which is also known as Lord Mar's Revolt, which was the attempt by James Francis Edward Stuart to regain the thrones of England, Ireland and Scotland for the exiled House of Stuart. Due to his participation in the uprising, he was deprived of the office of Knight Marischal. After his death, Charles Hamilton, Lord Binning became Knight Marischal.

Upon his father's death in April 1715, he succeeded as the 2nd Earl of Kintore.

== Personal life ==
Before 8 August 1687, Keith was married to the Hon. Catherine Murray, the eldest daughter of David Murray, 4th Viscount of Stormont and Lady Jean Murray (a widow of James Murray, 2nd Earl of Annandale and the eldest daughter of James Carnegie, 2nd Earl of Southesk). Together, they were the parents of two sons and a daughter:

- John Keith, 3rd Earl of Kintore (1699–1758), who married Mary Erskine (1714–1772), the only daughter of Rachel Chiesley and James Erskine, Lord Grange Principal Keeper of the Signet and a Lord Justice Clerk and a Lord of Justiciary (second son of Charles Erskine, Earl of Mar and Lady Mary Maule, a daughter of George Maule, 2nd Earl of Panmure), in 1729.
- William Keith, 4th Earl of Kintore (1701–1761), who died unmarried.
- Lady Catherine Margaret Keith, who married David Falconer, 4th Lord Falconer of Halkerton.

Lord Kintore died on 5 December 1718. He was succeeded by his eldest son, John.

=== Descendants ===
In 1761, on the death of his youngest son, the 4th Earl, the earldom should have passed under the terms of the 1694 regrant to his cousin George Keith, 10th and last Earl Marischal, as heir male of George Keith, 8th Earl Marischal, the elder brother of John Keith, 1st Earl of Kintore; however, he had been attainted for his part in the 1715 rising and so the earldom of Kintore remained suspended until the death of the 10th Earl Marischal on 28 May 1778, when it was inherited by the heir general of the 4th Earl of Kintore, Anthony Adrian Falconer, 7th Lord Falconer of Halkerton (a grandson of the 2nd Earl's daughter Lady Catherine), who became the 5th Earl of Kintore.

Peerage of Scotland
Preceded by John Keith	Earl of Kintore; 1715–1718	Succeeded by John Keith
