= William Falconer, 6th Lord Falconer of Halkerton =

English aristocrat

William Falconer, 6th Lord of Halkerton
- Born: c. 1712; Scotland
- Died: 11 October 1776 (aged 63–64); Groningen, Netherlands
- Spouse: Rembertina van Iddekinge (m. 1735)
- Children: 11, including Anthony
- Father: David Falconer

William Falconer, 6th Lord of Halkerton (c. 1712 – 11 October 1776) was a Scottish peer who was Lord Falconer of Halkerton from 1762 until his death in 1776.

== Early life ==
Descendants survey pedigree graph of the "Lords Falconer of Halkerton".

Falconer was the second son of David Falconer, 4th Lord Falconer of Halkerton and Lady Catherine Margaret Keith. His elder brother was Alexander Falconer, 5th Lord Falconer of Halkerton (who married Frances Mackworth, a daughter of Herbert Mackworth and granddaughter of Edward Noel, 1st Earl of Gainsborough).

As a young man, William Falconer went to Groningen to study.

== Career ==
Falconer served as Captain-Lieutenant of the Cavalries (in the regiment of Lintelo) and as Quarter-Bailiff in the "Meierij van 's-Hertogenbosch."

== Personal life ==
On 24 August 1735, William Falconer married Rembertina Maria van Iddekinge in Groningen at the Walloon Reformed Church of the Pelstergasthuis. A daughter of Burgomaster Pieter Rembt van Iddekinge of Groningen, his parents disapproved of the marriage and refused to support his family. Falconer remained in Holland for the rest of his life with his family becoming thoroughly Dutch. They lived in a house on Oosterstraat in Groningen and were the parents of:

- David Falconer (b. 1735), who died young.
- Pieter Rembt Falconer (1736–1773), who died unmarried at age 36.
- Bartha Johanna Falconer (1738–1809).
- Catharina Margrieta Falconer (1739–c. 1746, who died young.
- Wibbina Sophia Falconer (1740–1803), who married Willem Andreas Baurmeister in 1761.
- Anthony Adrian Keith-Falconer, 7th Lord Falconer of Halkerton (d. 1804), who married Christina Elizabeth Sichterman, a daughter of Jan Albert Sichterman of Groningen, the Intendant General of the Dutch Settlements in the East Indies and Director and Fiscal of Bengal.
- Susanna Helena Wilhelmina Falconer (1744–1746), who died young.
- Susanna Helena Wilhelmina Falconer (1746–1808).
- Catharina Margrieta Falconer (b. 1749).
- Alexander Falconer (1754–1826), who married Margaretha Clementia Keiser in 1784.
- Willem Arnold Falconer (1757–1777), a Lt. in the 15th Regiment of Foot who was killed, at age 20 at the Battle of Brandywine during the American Revolutionary War.

Falconer died in Groningen on 11 October 1776. His wife Rembertina died on 22 October 1779 in Groningen at age 66.
