= William Keith, 6th Earl Marischal =

Scottish lord, Earl Marischal and naval official

William Keith, 6th Earl Marischal (c. 1585 – 28 October 1635, castle of Dunnottar) was a Scottish lord, Earl Marischal and naval official.

== Life ==
He was the eldest son of George Keith, 5th Earl Marischal and his wife, Margaret (d. 1598), daughter of Alexander Home, 5th Lord Home. He left for the continent in 1601, travelling for his education to Paris, Orléans, Tours and Saumur, where he stayed with Philippe de Mornay. He and his father were summoned on 1608 to answer for William's conduct to Francis Sinclair, son of the Earl of Caithness. He went to London to attend court with his wife in 1610, staying for a year.

Keith acted as his father's deputy in the Scottish parliament in June 1621 and succeeded to his father's earldom on the latter's death on 2 April 1623. He ratified his father's building of Marischal College by a charter of 1 October 1623 and attended James VI and I's funeral on 5 May 1625 at Westminster Abbey. He was made a baronet of Nova Scotia at the end of May 1625 and, on the new Scottish privy council's restructuring in March 1626, he was made a member of it. He also joined the Scottish council of war on 12 July 1626 and was put in command of three ships to transport troops to aid Christian IV of Denmark, Charles I's uncle. This caused tension with Scotland's lord high admiral, Alexander, earl of Linlithgow, but these were in the end resolved by Marischal's confirmation as commander of the king's navy in Scotland on 9 July 1631. He received Charles I on his entry into Edinburgh in 1633 after his coronation and then in 1634 fitted out another fleet, which he sent to the assistance of Władysław IV Vasa.

== Marriage and issue ==
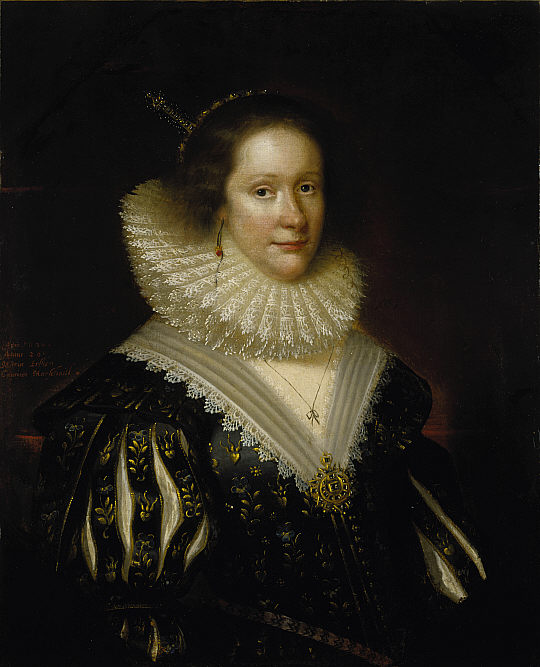
Mary Erskine, Countess Marischal, by George Jamesone

On 12 October 1609 he and Lady Mary Erskine, daughter of John Erskine, earl of Mar and his second wife, Marie Stewart, were contracted to be married. Nine of their children survived him:

- William Keith, 7th Earl Marischal (1614–1671)
- George Keith, 8th Earl Marischal
- Sir Robert Keith
- Alexander Keith (d. in or before 1654)
- John Keith, 1st Earl of Kintore (d. 1715)
- Mary, married in 1633 to John, Lord Kinpont
- Jean married to Alexander, Lord Forbes of Pitsligo
- Anne
- Isobel, married to Edward Turnor, Member of Parliament for Orford, and son of Edward Turnor, Speaker of the House of Commons.

After his death, his widow, Mary Erskine married Patrick Maule, 1st Earl of Panmure.

IMPORTANT NOTE - This article appears to have its information on which William Keith is which, and its 5th, 6th and 7th Earl Marischals confused. Refer to the Oxford Dictionary of National Biography entry for 'Keith, William, SIXTH Earl Marischal (1614–1671), nobleman, was the son of William Keith, FIFTH Earl Marischal (c.1585–1635), and Lady Mary, daughter of John Erskine, Earl of Mar'. The confusion arises because in 1927 Thomas Innes revised the hierarchy to include the father of William de Keith (original 1st Earl Marischal), another William, who then became the 1st Earl. The subsequent Earls all moved up one, thus this William Keith (1585–1635) was originally 5th and became 6th. So it depends upon whether you are determining the line pre or post 1927.

== Arms ==
Coat of arms of the Earl Marischal
Crest A Hart's Head erased proper armed with ten Tynes Or. Escutcheon Argent on a Chief Gules three Palets Or; behind the shield two Baton Gules semy of Thistles ensigned on the top with an Imperial Crown Or placed saltirewise being the insignia of the office of Great Marischal of Scotland. Supporters On either side a Hart proper attired as in the Crest. Motto Veritas Vincit (Truth conquers)

Peerage of Scotland
Preceded by George Keith	Earl Marischal; 1623–1635	Succeeded by William Keith
Baronetage of Nova Scotia
New creation	Baronet (of Rumbelows); 1625–1635	Succeeded by William Keith
