= Francis Keith-Falconer, 8th Earl of Kintore =

Scottish aristorcrat

The Right Honourable The Earl of Kintore
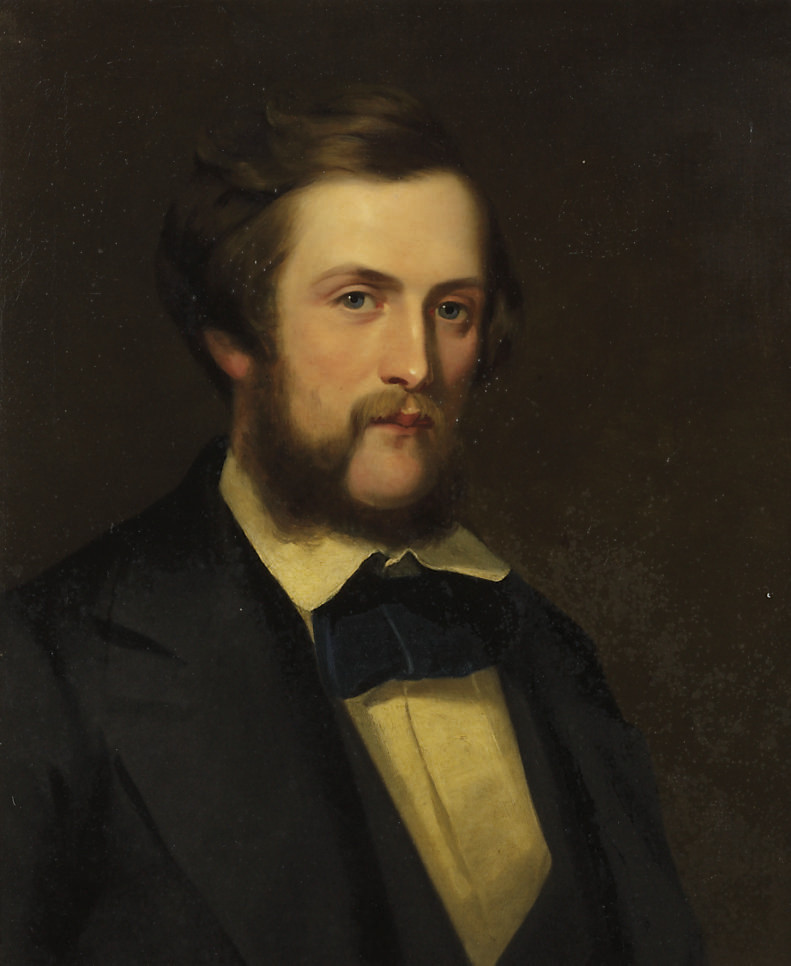
- Portrait of Lord Kintore by William Salter Herrick

Lord Lieutenant of Aberdeenshire
- In office 28 December 1863 – 18 July 1880
- Preceded by: The Marquess of Huntly
- Succeeded by: The Earl of Aberdeen

Lord Lieutenant of Kincardineshire
- In office 28 May 1856 – 1863
- Preceded by: The Earl of Southesk
- Succeeded by: Sir James Burnett, Bt

Personal details
- Born: Francis Alexander Keith-Falconer; 7 June 1828
- Died: 18 July 1880 (aged 52)
- Spouse: Louisa Hawkins (m. 1851)
- Parent(s): Anthony Keith-Falconer, 7th Earl of Kintore; Louisa Hawkins

Francis Alexander Keith-Falconer, 8th Earl of Kintore, Chief of Clan Keith (7 June 1828 – 18 July 1880), was a Scottish aristocrat.

== Early life ==
Keith-Falconer was born on 7 June 1828. He was the second son of Anthony Keith-Falconer, 7th Earl of Kintore and, his second wife, Louisa (née Hawkins), Countess of Kintore. After his parents divorced in 1840, his mother remarried to Dr. B. North Arnold (but died a year later in 1841). His elder brother was Lt. Hon. William Adrian Keith-Falconer, styled Lord Inverurie. His younger brother was Maj. Hon. Charles James Keith-Falconer, Commissioner of the Inland Revenue and his only sister was Lady Isabella Catherine Keith-Falconer (the wife of Henry Grant of Congalton).

His paternal grandparents were William Keith-Falconer, 6th Earl of Kintore and the former Maria Bannerman (daughter of Sir Alexander Bannerman, 6th Baronet). His mother was the youngest daughter of Francis Hawkins of Bareilly, Bengal, India.

== Career ==
His elder brother, Lord Inverurie, died unmarried in 1843 and Francis became heir apparent to his father, who died the following year on 11 July 1844 at which point he became the 8th Earl of Kintore, 8th Lord Keith of Inverurie and Keith Hall.

On 28 May 1856, he became Lord Lieutenant of Kincardineshire succeeding James Carnegie, 9th Earl of Southesk. He served in that role until 1863 when he was succeeded by Sir James Burnett, 10th Baronet. In December 1863, Lord Kintore became Lord Lieutenant of Aberdeenshire, succeeding Charles Gordon, 10th Marquess of Huntly. He served in that role until his death. After his death, he was succeeded by John Hamilton-Gordon, 1st Marquess of Aberdeen and Temair.

== Personal life ==
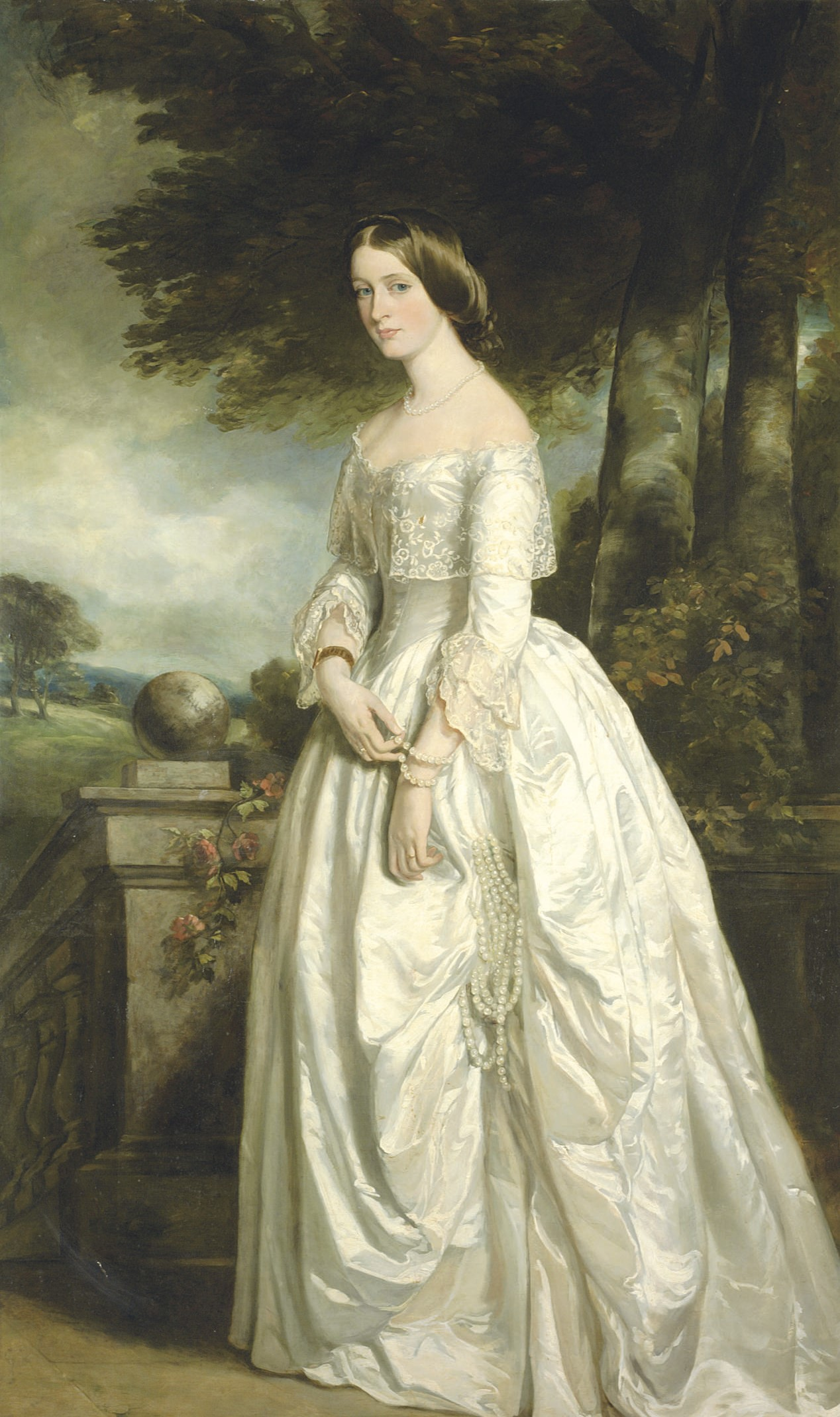
Portrait of his wife, Louisa, Countess of Kintore, by Francis Grant (dated 1851).

On 24 June 1851, Lord Kintore was married to his cousin Louisa Madeleine Hawkins (12 January 1828 – 6 February 1916), the second daughter of his maternal uncle, Francis Hawkins. Together, they were the parents of:

- Algernon Hawkins Thomond Keith-Falconer, 9th Earl of Kintore (12 August 1852 – 3 March 1930), who married Lady Sydney Charlotte Montagu (14 October 1851 – 21 September 1932), the second daughter of George Montagu, 6th Duke of Manchester, on 14 August 1873.
- Hon. Dudley Metcalfe Courtenay Keith-Falconer (13 January 1854 – 27 November 1873), who died unmarried.
- Hon. Ion Grant Neville Keith-Falconer (5 July 1856 – 11 May 1887), who married Gwendolen Bevan (11 November 1865 – 24 October 1937), a daughter of British banker Robert Cooper Lee Bevan of Fosbury House, on 4 March 1884.
- Lady Janet Arnot Keith-Falconer (7 December 1857 – 9 December 1925), who married William Hamilton Brown (15 September 1850 – 6 September 1899) on 29 December 1876.
- Lady Madeleine Dora Keith-Falconer (27 October 1858 – 11 December 1925), who married Capt. Francis Henry Tonge (8 June 1855 – 6 March 1936), a son of Capt. Louis Tonge of the Royal Navy, on 20 July 1889.
- Lady Blanche Catherine Keith-Falconer (15 September 1859 – 18 September 1922), who married Col. Granville Roland Francis Smith (24 December 1860 – 4 March 1917) of Duffield Hall, a son of MP Rowland Smith, on 4 December 1883.
- Hon. Arthur Keith-Falconer (27 August 1863 – 9 December 1877), who died young.
- Lady Maude Keith-Falconer (20 July 1869 – 22 June 1921), never married.

Lord Kintore died on 18 July 1880, aged 52. His widow, the Dowager Countess of Kintore, died on 6 February 1916, aged 88.

Honorary titles
Preceded by The Marquess of Huntly	Lord Lieutenant of Aberdeenshire; 1863–1880	Succeeded by The Marquess of Aberdeen and Temair
Preceded by The Earl of Southesk	Lord Lieutenant of Kincardineshire; 1856–1863	Succeeded by Sir James Burnett, Bt
Peerage of Scotland
Preceded by Anthony Adrian Keith-Falconer	Earl of Kintore; 1844–1880	Succeeded by Algernon Hawkins Thomond; Keith-Falconer
