= Algernon Keith-Falconer, 9th Earl of Kintore =

British politician and colonial governor

The Right Honourable The Earl of Kintore KT GCMG PC FRSE
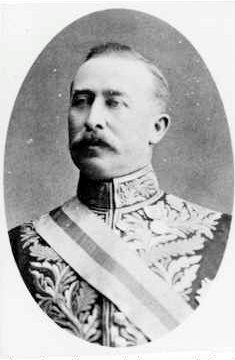

12th Governor of South Australia
- In office 11 April 1889 – 10 April 1895
- Monarch: Queen Victoria
- Premier: Thomas Playford II (1889; John Cockburn (1889-90); Thomas Playford II (1890-92); Frederick Holder (1892); Sir John Downer (1892-93); Charles Kingston (1893-95)
- Preceded by: Sir William Robinson
- Succeeded by: Sir Thomas Buxton

Personal details
- Born: Algernon Hawkins Thomond Keith-Falconer; 12 August 1852 Lixmount House, Trinity, Edinburgh
- Died: 3 March 1930 (aged 77) 10 Park Place, St James Street, London
- Spouse: Lady Sydney Charlotte Montagu (m. 1873; died 1930)
- Parent(s): Francis Keith Falconer, 8th Earl of Kintore; Louisa Madeleine Hawkins
- Education: Eton College
- Alma mater: Trinity College, Cambridge

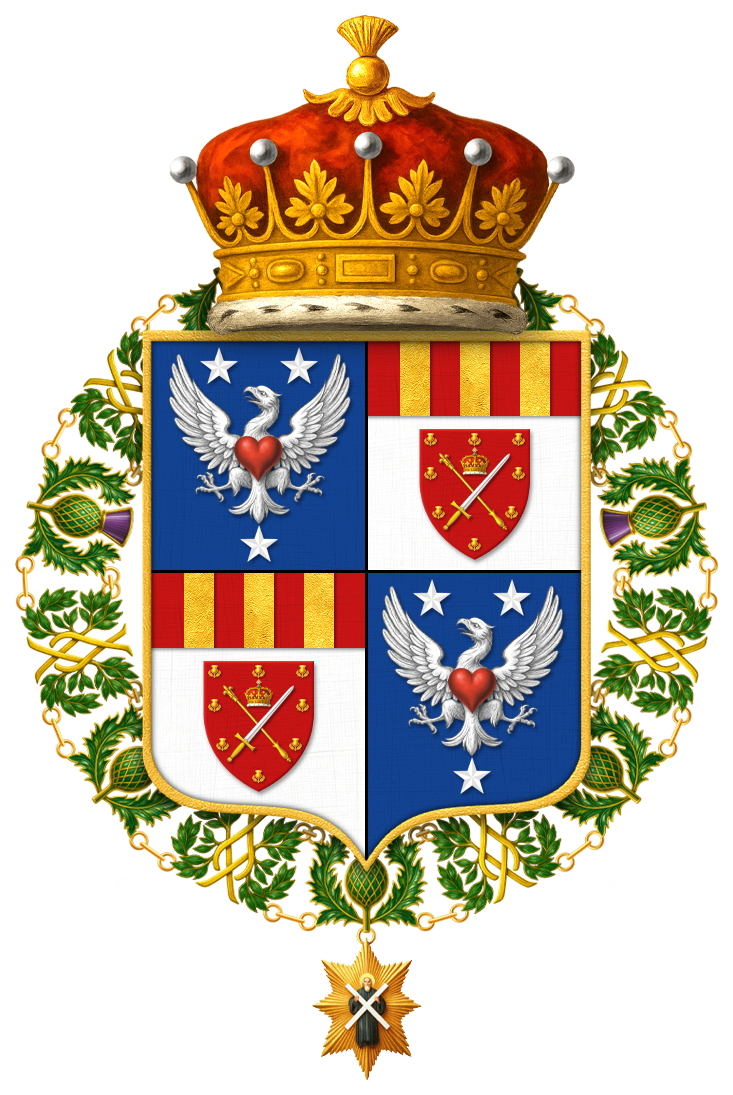
Shield of arms of Algernon Hawkins Thomond Keith-Falconer, 9th Earl of Kintore, KT, GCMG, PC, FRSE

Algernon Hawkins Thomond Keith-Falconer, 9th Earl of Kintore, Chief of Clan Keith, KT, GCMG, PC, FRSE (12 August 1852 – 3 March 1930), was a British politician and colonial governor.

== Early life ==
Keith-Falconer was born at Lixmount House, in Trinity, Edinburgh, on 12 August 1852. He was the eldest son of Francis Keith Falconer, 8th Earl of Kintore and his wife Louisa Madeleine, née Hawkins. Among his siblings were Hon. Dudley Metcalfe Courtenay Keith-Falconer (who died unmarried), Hon. Ion Keith-Falconer (who married Gwendolen Bevan, a daughter of banker Robert Cooper Lee Bevan of Fosbury House), Lady Madeleine Dora Keith-Falconer (who married Capt. Francis Henry Tonge), Lady Blanche Catherine Keith-Falconer (who married Col. Granville Roland Francis Smith of Duffield Hall, a son of MP Rowland Smith).

He was educated at Eton and Trinity College, Cambridge.

== Career ==
In 1880, Lord Kintore was the unsuccessful Conservative candidate for Chelsea. He succeeded to his father's titles upon his father's death in 1880, was appointed First Government Whip in the House of Lords in 1885 and was a Lord-in-waiting from 1885 to 1886 and from 1895 to 1905. In 1886, he was invested as a Privy Counsellor. In 1913 he was elected a Senior Deputy Speaker of the House of Lords.

=== Governor of South Australia ===
Lord Kintore was Governor of South Australia between 1889 and 10 April 1895. He was made a Knight-Grand-Cross of the Order of St Michael and St George (GCMG) on his appointment. A freemason, he was also Grand-Master of the United Grand Lodge of South Australia during his term as Governor (1889–1895).

He arrived with his family in South Australia on 11 April 1889 aboard the Orient and was formally welcomed by the administrator, Chief Justice Samuel Way, who later resigned as Grand Master of the United Grand Lodge of South Australia in his favour.

=== Court, military and later life ===
Lord Kintore acted as Lord-in-waiting for Queen Victoria for 1885/6 and Edward VII 1901–05. In early 1901 he was asked by King Edward to take part in a special diplomatic mission to announce the King's accession to the governments of Denmark, Sweden and Norway, Russia, Germany, and Saxony.

Lord Kintore was appointed lieutenant-colonel in command of the 3rd (Militia) Battalion of the Gordon Highlanders on 17 October 1891. He also held the honorary rank of colonel. In January 1903 he was appointed an Aide-de-Camp for Militia to the King, and received the substantive rank of colonel in the militia.

He was a Knight of Grand-Cross of the Order of the Crown of Italy of Italy, a 1st Class of the Order of the Red Eagle of Prussia, a Grand-Cross of the Military Order of Our Lord Jesus Christ of Portugal and a Grand-Cross of the Order of the Polar Star of Sweden.

In 1911, Kintore was presented with a royal gift cigarette case by Prince Ferdinand of Bavaria (1884–1958). A century later, the gift featured in the Christie's London sale, SALE 7970 —IMPORTANT JEWELS held on 8 June 2011.

Kintore was the Grand Master of the Royal Order of Scotland from 1917 to 1925.

== Personal life ==
Lord Kintore married Lady Sydney Charlotte Montagu (1851–1932), second daughter of George Montagu, 6th Duke of Manchester, at St George's, Hanover Square, London, on 14 August 1873. Together, they were the parents of two sons and two daughters, including:

- Ethel Sydney Keith-Falconer, 11th Countess of Kintore (1874–1974), who married John Baird, 1st Viscount Stonehaven, son of Sir Alexander Baird, 1st Baronet and Hon. Annette Maria Palk (a daughter of the 1st Baron Haldon), in 1905.
- Lady Hilda Madeleine Keith-Falconer (1875–1967), who died unmarried.
- Ian Douglas Montagu Keith-Falconer (1877–1897), styled Lord Inverurie, a Lieutenant in the 3rd Battalion, Gordon Highlanders, who died unmarried.
- Arthur George Keith-Falconer, 10th Earl of Kintore (1879–1966), who married American heiress Helena Montagu, Duchess of Manchester (née Zimmerman), the divorced wife of William Montagu, 9th Duke of Manchester who was a daughter of Eugene Zimmerman, in 1937.

He died on 3 March 1930 aged 77 at 10 Park Place, St James Street, London, of acute bronchitis and periurethral abscess and interred on 7 March 1930 at Keith Hall, Inverurie, Aberdeen. He was succeeded on the earldom by his second but only surviving son, Arthur. Kintore's daughter, Lady Ethel Sydney Keith-Falconer, wife of John Baird, 1st Viscount Stonehaven, eventually inherited the earldom. His widow, the dowager Lady Kintore, died at Inverurie, Aberdeen on 21 September 1932.

== Legacy ==
Places and other items named for Earl Kintore include:

- County of Kintore in South Australia in 1890
- The town of Kintore, Northern Territory
- Kintore, Western Australia, now a ghost town
- Kintore Avenue in Adelaide city centre
- Kintore's egernia (Liopholis kintorei), an Australian lizard named in 1893
- Mount Kintore and the Kintore Range in the Northern Territory, named by William Tietkens during his expedition of 1889

== See also ==
- Tietkens expedition of 1889

Party political offices
Preceded by The Earl of Lathom	Conservative Chief Whip in the Lords; 1885–1889	Succeeded by The Earl of Limerick
Political offices
Preceded by The Earl of Dalhousie	Lord-in-waiting; 1885–1886	Succeeded by The Lord Camoys
Preceded by The Lord Monson	Captain of the Yeomen of the Guard; 1886–1889	Succeeded by The Earl of Limerick
Preceded by The Lord Henniker	Lord-in-waiting; 1895–1905	Succeeded by The Earl of Granard
Government offices
Preceded by Sir William Robinson	Governor of South Australia; 1889–1895	Succeeded by Sir Thomas Buxton
Peerage of Scotland
Preceded by Francis Alexander Keith-Falconer	Earl of Kintore; 1880–1930	Succeeded by Arthur George Keith-Falconer
