= John Keith, 1st Earl of Kintore =

Scottish nobleman

The Right Honourable The Earl of Kintore PC (Scot)

Keeper of the Privy Seal of Scotland
- In office 1689–1690
- Preceded by: Archibald Douglas
- Succeeded by: John Carmichael

Personal details
- Born: John Keith c. 1630
- Died: 15 April 1715 (aged 84–85)
- Spouse: Lady Margaret Hamilton (after 1662)
- Children: Lady Jean Forbes; Lady Margaret Hamilton; William Keith, 2nd Earl of Kintore
- Parent(s): William Keith, 6th Earl Marischal; Lady Mary Erskine

Sir John Keith, 1st Earl of Kintore PC (Scot) (c. 1630 – 12 April 1715), was a Scottish nobleman.

== Early life ==
He was the fourth son of nine surviving children born to William Keith, 6th Earl Marischal, and Lady Mary Erskine. Among his siblings were brothers William Keith (the 7th Earl), George Keith (the 8th Earl), Sir Robert Keith, Alexander Keith, and sisters Mary Keith (wife of John, Lord Kinpont), Jean Keith (wife of Alexander, Lord Forbes of Pitsligo), Anne Keith, and Isobel Keith (wife of MP Edward Turnor, son of Edward Turnor, Speaker of the House of Commons).

His father was the eldest son of George Keith, 5th Earl Marischal and his wife, the Hon. Margaret Home (a daughter of Alexander Home, 5th Lord Home). His mother was the eldest daughter of John Erskine, 19th and de jure 2nd Earl of Mar (the only son of another John Erskine and Annabella Murray) and, his second wife, Marie Stewart (the daughter of Esmé Stewart, 1st Duke of Lennox).

== Career ==
An augmentation of honor representing the Honors of Scotland was granted to John Keith in 1677: Gules a Sceptre and Sword in saltire with an Imperial Crown between the upper corners all proper within an Orle of eight Thistles slipped near the head Or.

A Royalist during the Civil War, Keith and his brother William Keith, 7th Earl Marischal held Dunnottar Castle against Oliver Cromwell's forces in 1651. The Honours of Scotland had been placed at Dunnottar for safety during the Wars of the Three Kingdoms, and Robert Overton, commanding a force of the New Model Army besieged the Castle hoping to recover them.

While the regalia was smuggled out of the castle to be hidden at Kinneff Parish church, Keith boarded ship for France, and was captured on his return by the parliamentarians. Keith insisted that he had delivered them to Charles II. The regalia remained at Kinneff until the Restoration.

In 1676, he was made Councillor to the Privy Council of Scotland and a commissioner of the Council for Public Affairs in 1677. He was created Knight Marischal of Scotland upon Charles II return, and in 1677 was created Earl of Kintore along with the subsidiary title of Lord Keith of Inverurie and Keith Hall, a reward for his part in preserving the Honours of Scotland in various hiding-places during the British Interregnum. and Between 1684 and 1687 Kintore was Treasurer-Depute of Scotland. He was Keeper of the Privy Seal of Scotland in 1689. Lord Kintore was a supporter of both the Glorious Revolution and the 1707 Acts of Union.

On 22 February 1694, Lord Kintore "had a regrant, after resignation, of his titles extending the remainder to his elder brother" George Keith, 7th Earl Marischal, "and the heirs male of his body, whom failing to the heirs general of his own body."

== Personal life ==
On 24 April 1662, Kintore was married to Lady Margaret Hamilton (b. 1641), the only child, born posthumously, of Thomas Hamilton, 2nd Earl of Haddington by his second wife Lady Jean Gordon (the third daughter of George Gordon, 2nd Marquess of Huntly and Lady Anne Campbell, herself a daughter of Archibald Campbell, 7th Earl of Argyll). Together, they were the parents of:

- Lady Jean Keith (b. 1678), who married Sir William Forbes, 4th Baronet of Monymusk
- Lady Margaret Keith, who married Maj. Gavin Hamilton of Raploch, a son of William Hamilton of Raploch and Jean (née Kennedy) Hamilton.
- William Keith, 2nd Earl of Kintore (1695–1718), who married Hon. Catherine Murray, the eldest daughter of David Murray, 4th Viscount of Stormont and Lady Jean Murray (a widow of James Murray, 2nd Earl of Annandale and the eldest daughter of James Carnegie, 2nd Earl of Southesk).

Lord Kintore died on 12 April 1715. He was succeeded by his only son, William.

Peerage of Scotland
New creation	Earl of Kintore; 1677–1714	Succeeded by William Keith
Political offices
Preceded by Archibald Douglas	Keeper of the Privy Seal of Scotland; 1689–1690	Succeeded by John Carmichael
