= Earl of Kintore =

Title in the Peerage of Scotland

Earldom of Kintore
- Blazon: Arms: Quarterly: 1st and 4th Argent on a Chief Gules three Pallets Or (Keith); 2nd, Azure a Falcon displayed between three Mullets one and two Argent on his breast a Man's Heart Gules (Falconer of Halkerton); 3rd, Per pale engrailed Gules and Or a Boar passant counterchanged (Baird of Ury); over all on an Escutcheon Gules a Sceptre and Sword in saltire with an Imperial Crown between the upper corners all proper within an Orle of eight Thistles slipped near the head Or, ensigned with an Earl's Coronet proper (being the Coat of Augmentation granted to John, 1st Earl of Kintore, for his services in the preservation of the Regalia of Scotland); Crest: 1st: A Noble Lady from the middle richly attired holding in her right hand a Garland proper (Crest of Augmentation for Earldom of Kintore); A Roebuck's Head proper attired Or (Keith); Supporters: On either side a Man in Complete Armour proper each holding in the exterior hand a Spear Gules headed Argent in posture of sentinels
- Creation date: 20 June 1677
- Created by: Charles II
- Peerage: Peerage of Scotland
- First holder: John Keith, 1st Lord Keith of Inverurie and Keith Hall
- Present holder: James William Falconer Keith, 14th Earl of Kintore
- Heir apparent: Tristan Michael Keith, Lord Keith of Inverurie and Keith Hall
- Subsidiary titles: Lord Keith of Inverurie and Keith Hall
- Seat: Keith Hall
- Motto: Dexter: Quae amissa salva (What has been lost is safe); Sinister: Veritas vincit (Truth conquers)

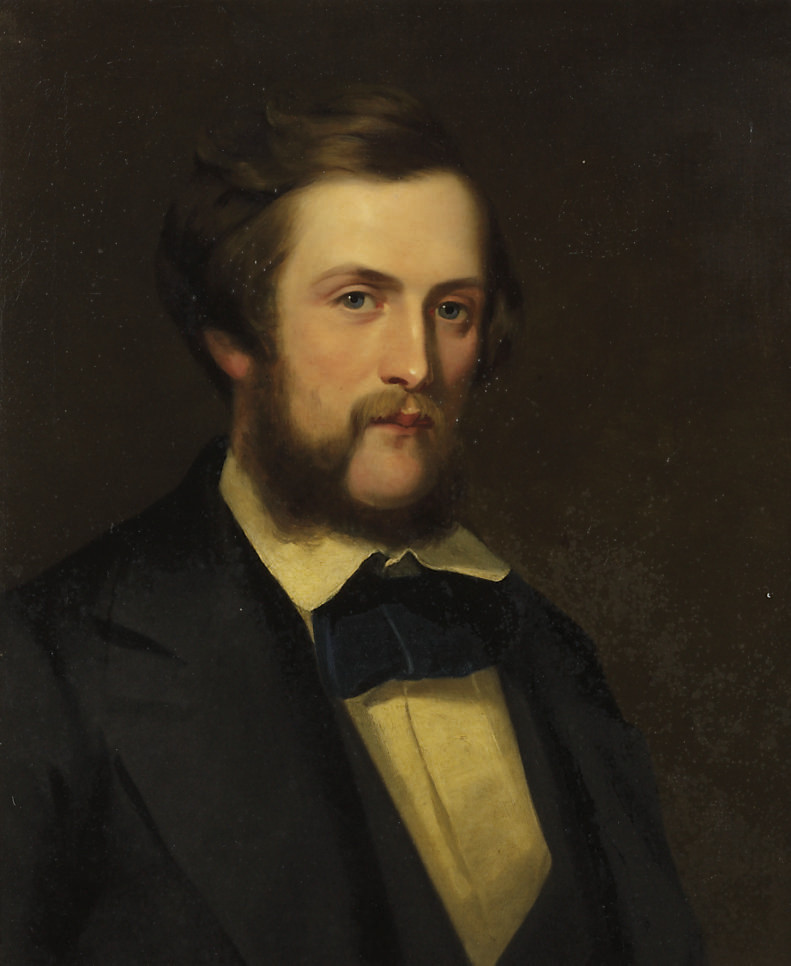
Portrait of Francis Keith-Falconer, 8th Earl of Kintore, by William Salter Herrick

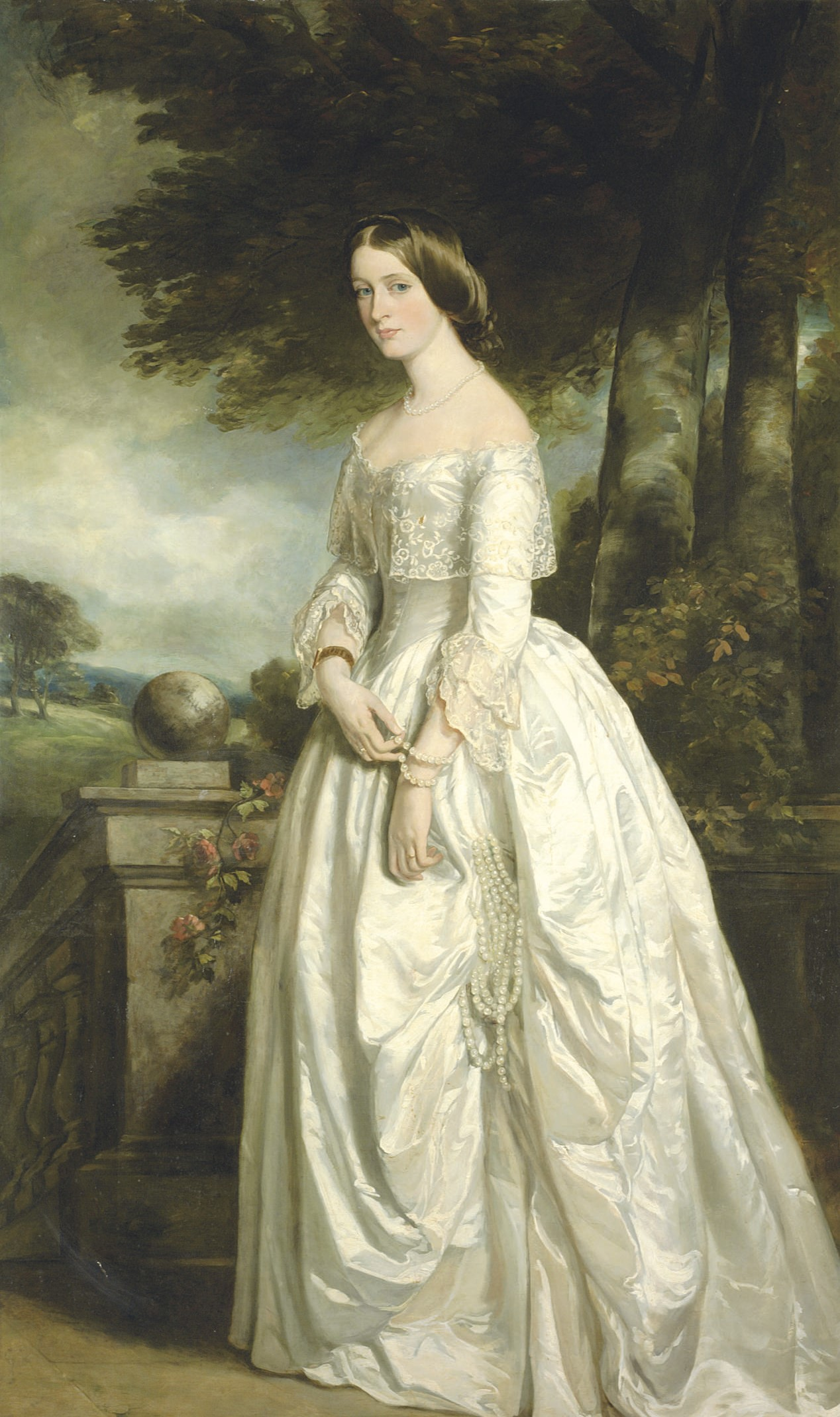
Portrait of Louisa, Countess of Kintore, by Francis Grant

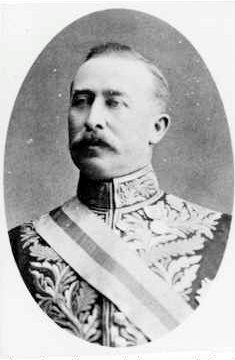
Photograph of Algernon Keith-Falconer, 9th Earl of Kintore

Earl of Kintore is a title in the Peerage of Scotland. It was created in 1677 for Sir John Keith, third son of William Keith, 6th Hereditary Earl Marischal of Scotland (see Earl Marischal for earlier history of the family) and Chief of Clan Keith. He was made Lord Keith of Inverurie and Keith Hall at the same time, also in the Peerage of Scotland. At the death of William, the 4th Earl, in 1761, the Earldom and Lordship became dormant, as no-one could prove a claim to them. In 1778, it was decided that the Earldom, Lordship and Chieftaincy of Clan should pass to Anthony Adrian Falconer, Lord Falconer of Halkerton, who changed his surname to Keith-Falconer. The Lordship Falconer of Halkerton and the Earldom of Kintore and Lordship Keith of Inverurie and Keith Hall remained united until 1966, when, at the death of the 10th Earl, the Lordship Falconer of Halkerton became dormant.

The 11th holder of the titles, Ethel Sydney Keith-Falconer, married John Baird, 1st Viscount Stonehaven. At the death of Lord Stonehaven, the titles Viscount Stonehaven (created 1938), and Baron Stonehaven (created 1925), both in the Peerage of the United Kingdom, as well as the Baird of Urie Baronetcy, in the Baronetage of the United Kingdom, passed to the couple's son, James Ian. The Countess of Kintore, who died the day after her one-hundredth birthday, was the longest-lived female holder of a British peerage; upon inheriting his mother's titles, her son James Ian changed his surname from Baird to Keith.

The family seat is Keith Hall, near Inverurie, Aberdeenshire.

The heir apparent to the earldom uses the courtesy title Lord Keith of Inverurie and Keith Hall.

== Lords Keith of Inverurie and Keith Hall (1677) ==
- John Keith, 1st Lord Keith of Inverurie and Keith Hall (d. 1714) (created Earl of Kintore in 1677)

== Earls of Kintore (1677) ==
- John Keith, 1st Earl of Kintore (d. 1714)
- William Keith, 2nd Earl of Kintore (d. 1718)
- John Keith, 3rd Earl of Kintore (c. 1699–1758)
- William Keith, 4th Earl of Kintore (c. 1702–1761) (dormant 1761)
- Anthony Adrian Keith-Falconer, 5th Earl of Kintore (d. 1804) (revived 1778)
- William Keith-Falconer, 6th Earl of Kintore (1766–1812)
- Anthony Adrian Keith-Falconer, 7th Earl of Kintore (1794–1844)
  - William Adrian Keith-Falconer, Lord Keith of Inverurie and Keith Hall (1822–1843)
- Francis Alexander Keith-Falconer, 8th Earl of Kintore (1828–1880)
- Algernon Hawkins Thomond Keith-Falconer, 9th Earl of Kintore (1852–1930)
  - Ian Douglas Montagu Keith-Falconer, Lord Keith of Inverurie and Keith Hall (1877–1897)
- Arthur George Keith-Falconer, 10th Earl of Kintore (1879–1966).
- Ethel Sydney Keith-Falconer, 11th Countess of Kintore (1874–1974)
- James Ian Keith, 12th Earl of Kintore (1908–1989) (succeeded as 2nd Viscount Stonehaven, 2nd Baron Stonehaven, 3rd Baronet, 4th of Ury in 1941)
- Michael Canning William John Keith, 13th Earl of Kintore (1939–2004)
- James William Falconer Keith, 14th Earl of Kintore (b. 1976)

== Present peer ==
James William Falconer Keith of Urie, 14th Earl of Kintore, also Lord Keith of Inverurie and Keith Hall, Viscount Stonehaven, Baron Stonehaven, and a Baronet, of Ury (born 1976), is the son of the 13th Earl. On 30 October 2004 he succeeded his father to the peerages and baronetcy. He married and had one son:

- Tristan Michael Keith, Lord Keith of Inverurie and Keith Hall (born 2010), heir apparent to the earldom of Kintore.

Lord Kintore lives at Caskieben. He has a sister, Lady Iona Delia Mary Gaddis Keith (born 1978), who in 2008 married Mark Hopkins, younger son of Mrs Violet Hopkins, of Welwyn Garden City. She was heir presumptive to the earldom of Kintore before the birth of the present heir.

== Arms ==
Coat of arms of Earl of Kintore
Notes Originally adopted by the 11th Countess. Coronet The Coronet of an Earl Crest Dexter: a Noble Lady from her middle richly attired, holding in her right hand a Garland proper (Crest of Augmentation for Earldom of Kintore). Sinister: a Roebuck's Head proper, attired Or. Escutcheon Quarterly: 1st & 4th, Argent, on a Chief Gules, three Pallets Or (Keith); 2nd, Azure, a Falcon displayed between three Mullets one and two Argent, on his breast a Man's Heart Gules (Falconer of Halkerton); 3rd, Per pale engrailed Gules and Or, a Boar passant counter-changed (Baird of Ury); over all on an Escutcheon Gules, a Sceptre and Sword in saltire with an Imperial Crown between the upper corners all proper, within an Orle of eight Thistles slipped near the head Or, ensigned with an Earl's Coronet proper (being the Coat of Augmentation granted to John, 1st Earl of Kintore, for his services in the preservation of the Regalia of Scotland). Supporters On either side a Man in Complete Armour proper, each holding in the exterior hand a Spear Gules, headed Argent, in posture of sentinels. Motto Above the dexter Crest: QUAE AMISSA SALVA (What has been lost is safe) Above the sinister Crest: VERITAS VINCIT (Truth conquers) Beneath the Shield: THAY SAY QUHAY SAY THAY, THAY HALF SAYD LAT THAME SAY

== See also ==
- Viscount Stonehaven
- Earl Marischal
- Clan Keith
