= Sir Alexander Falconer, 1st Lord Falconer of Halkerton =

Scottish judge

Sir Alexander Falconer, 1st Lord Falconer of Halkerton (1595–1671), was a Scottish judge.

== Life ==
Falconer was the eldest son of Sir Alexander Falconer of Halkertoun, by his wife Agnes Carnegie, eldest daughter of David Carnegie of Colluthie.

On 9 July 1639 he succeeded Lord Woodhall as an ordinary lord of session.

King Charles I granted Sir Alexander a yearly pension of £200 with the title, for his ability, integrity, and affection for administration of Justice.

In November 1641 was appointed anew by king and parliament to be judge "ad vitam aut culpam". He represented Kincardineshire in the convention 1643–4, and in the parliaments of 1644–5, 1645–7. He was a commissioner for the loan and tax in 1643, and a member of the committee of war for Kincardineshire in 1643, 1644, and 1646, and for Forfarshire in 1648. He was a commissioner for the plantation of kirks in 1644, a commissioner of the exchequer in 1645, a member of the committee of estates in 1645 and 1647, and a colonel for Aberdeenshire in 1648.

His rise and influence in the Scottish government was recognized on 20 December 1646, when he was created "Lord Falconer of Halkerton", with destination to himself and his heirs-male whatsoever.

On 15 February 1649 he was deprived of his seat in the College of Justice, and "ordained to lend money for the public use", on account of his accession to the "engagement". He appears, however, as Baron Falconer in the list of Scots nobility in 1650, and was a commissioner of supply for Kincardineshire in 1656 and 1659.

Falconer was reappointed to his seat in the College of Justice at the Restoration, and retained it till his death. In 1661 he was a commissioner of excise, and a member of the commission for visiting the university of Aberdeen. He appears as sitting in parliament as Lord Halkertoun till 1669, and died 1 October 1671.

== Family ==
Falconer married Anne, only daughter of John Lindsay, 9th Lord Lindsay of Byres, by whom he had one son; and one daughter Agnes, who married George Ogilvy, 2nd Lord Banff.
