= Jan Albert Sichterman =

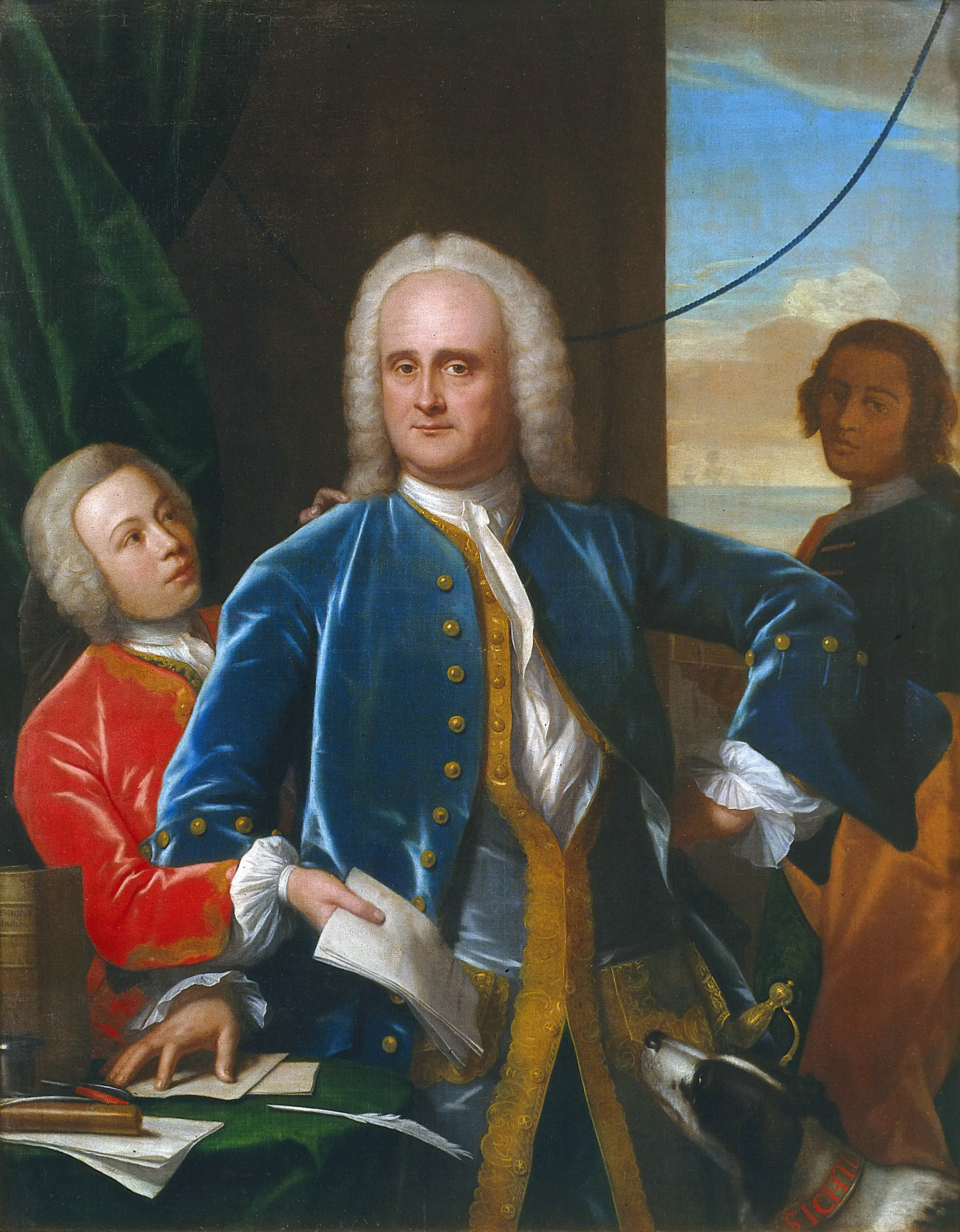
Sichterman with sons Jan Albert and Gerritt Jan, c. 1745, by Philip van Dijk

Jan Albert Sichterman (19 September 1692 – 15 January 1764) was a Dutch East India Company employee who went to Bengal and returned to his hometown of Groningen and built a palatial home for himself known as the Sichtermanhuis at Ossenmarkt. He also collected fine artwork and some of his collections were acquired by the Groninger Museum. Sichterman was also involved in the transport of the famous rhinoceros Clara to the Netherlands.

Sichterman was born in Groningen, son of Margaretha Celosse and infantry officer Galenus. He followed his father in a military career. In 1715, following a duel in which his opponent was killed, he fled and joined the Vereenigde Oostindische Compagnie (Dutch East India Company) and left in 1716 to live in Batavia for a year before becoming a junior merchant in Bengal. He served as a cashier at Cossimbazar from 1719. In 1721, he married Sibylla Volkera daughter of the a high ranking company officer in Bengal, Jacob Sadelijn and his wife Anna Francoise Pelgrom. The Sadelijn and Pelgrom families were very influential. In 1723 he moved to Batavia following conflict with the director for Bengal, Pieter Vuyst. Vuyst was replaced by Jacob Sadelijn in 1724 and Sichterman moved back and became a "Fiscaal" (=treasurer) at Hooghly. In 1731 he became an in-charge of Cossimbazar and in 1733 he replaced Rogier Berenaart on his death taking care of the director's position for Bengal. In 1734 he was formally appointed director for Bengal. In 1742 he constructed, at his own cost, a church at Chinsurah and owned land in the area which he called Sichtermanswijk. He retired in 1744 and returned to the Netherlands in 1745.

Sichterman used his influence and power to become wealthy and personally traded in materials. His network included the Frenchman Joseph Dupleix and his Dutch agent Gerard Pauw. It was the norm was the Dutch agents to keep good terms with the local rulers through the exchange of gifts. The Nawab of Dhaka was typically given cash and this was reciprocated once by a live elephant to Beerenaart. A similar gift was received in 1739 of a female baby rhinoceros which Sichterman raised at home. When the rhino grew big, he handed her to a Dutch trading ship captain, Douwe Mout van der Meer who took it back to Europe where she became a celebrity - Clara. Before moving to the Netherlands, he acquired and built a home at Ossemarkt. He began work in 1743 with help from A. J. Trip and had the architecture designed by Theodorus van der Haven. He moved into the home in 1745 where parts housed his collections of fine art objects. He also owned a country summer home "Woellust" in Wildervank. After his death, his widow sold off his belongings to pay off debts.

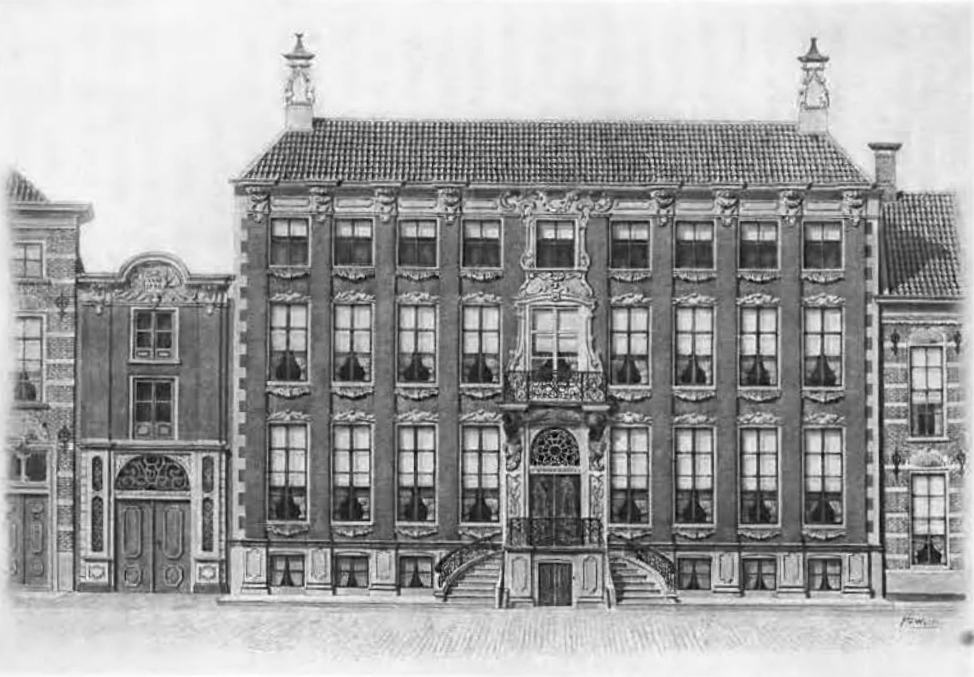
Plan of Sichtermanhuis

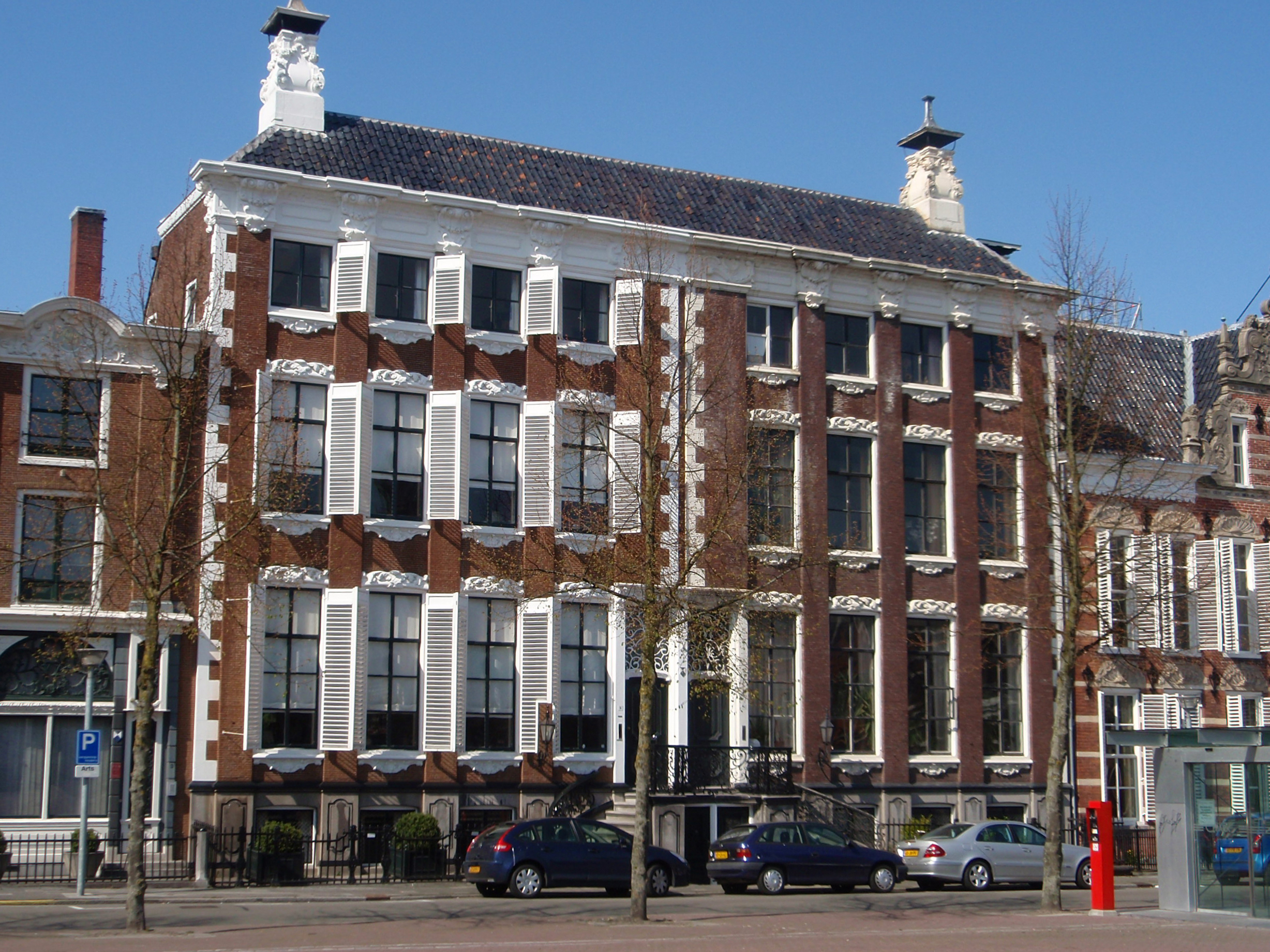
As the build stands today following its division

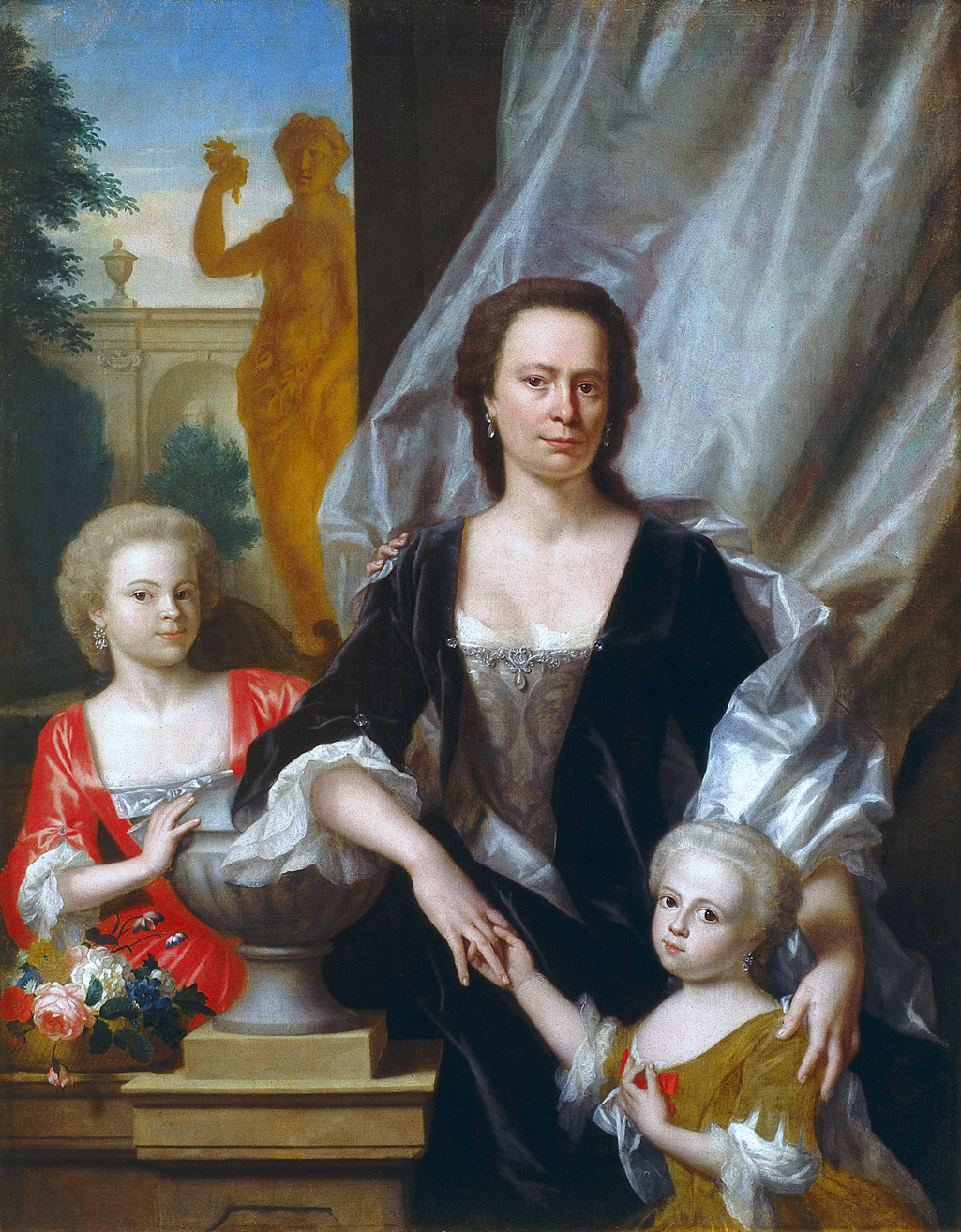
Wife Sybilla and daughters
