= List of people from Veneto =

Veneto, a region of Italy, has been the native land of many notable people, some of whom are listed below.

== A–B ==
- Amy Adams actress (Adams is American but was born in Veneto)
- Alexander VIII born "Pietro Vito Ottoboni" (22 April 1610 Venice – 1 February 1691 Rome) was pope from 1689 to 1691.
- Pomponio Amalteo (1505 Motta di Livenza – 1588 San Vito al Tagliamento) was an Italian painter of the Venetian school. Members of the Amalteo family from Oderzo were writers.
- Moreno Argentin (born 17 December 1960, San Donà di Piave), province of Venice is a former professional cyclist.
- Gaetano Astolfoni (18th-19th century), Italian painter
- Marco d'Aviano (1631 Aviano, Republic of Venice – 1699) was a Capuchin friar, papal legate to the "Holy League", and purported inventor of cappuccino; beatified in 2003.
- Roberto Baggio (born 18 February 1967), former Italian footballer (soccer player), regarded as among the best players in the world throughout the 1990s.
- Pietro Bembo (1470 Venice – 1547 Rome), Venetian patrician, historian of the Republic, Renaissance poet and humanist, named cardinal by Pope Paul III in 1539.
- Benedict XI born "Nicholas Boccasini" (1240 Treviso – 7 July 1304 Perugia), pope from 1303 to 1304.
- Benetton family whose global upmarket clothing brand is based in Treviso, Italy.
- Angelo Beolco a.k.a. "il Ruzzante" or "el Ruzante" (c. 1496 Padua – 1542), actor and playwright who wrote in the dialect of Padua.
- Antonio Bisaglia,
- Gelindo Bordin (born 2 April 1959) is a former athlete, winner of the marathon race at the 1988 Summer Olympics.
- Marco Antonio Bragadin, also Marcantonio Bragadin, (21 April 1523 – 17 August 1571), Venetian lawyer and military officer, Captain-General of Famagusta, Cyprus, gruesomely killed by the Ottomans

== C–F ==
- John Cabot (Italian: Giovanni Caboto, c. 1450 Genoa – c. 1499), navigator and explorer acknowledged as the first European to discover the North American mainland in 1497; a citizen of the Republic of Venice.
- Sebastian Cabot (Italian: Sebastiano Caboto, 1474 Venice – 1557 London), explorer for Spain and England, son of John Cabot.
- Antonio Canova (1 November 1757 – 13 October 1822) was a sculptor who became famous for his marble sculptures that delicately rendered nude flesh.
- Caius Volteius Capito (born ? Oderzo – died ?), centurion who fought with Julius Caesar in the Roman Civil War against Pompey.
- Giacomo Casanova (aka Jacques Casanova) (2 April 1725 Venice – 4 June 1798 Dux, Bohemia (now Duchcov, Czech Republic)), infamous Venetian adventurer, writer, and womanizer.
- Panfilo Castaldi (1398 Belluno – 1479 Venice?), switched from studying medicine to typography; he is considered a precursor of Johannes Gutenberg.
- Gaius Valerius Catullus (c. 84 BC Verona – c. 54 BC Rome), one of the most influential Roman poets of the 1st century BC.
- Clement XIII born "Carlo della Torre Rezzonico", (7 March 1693 Venice – 2 February 1769 Rome), pope 6 July 1758 to 2 February 1769.
- Gasparo Contarini (16 October 1483 Venice – 24 August 1542), diplomat, cardinal, Bishop of Belluno, supporter of the Jesuits, and a proponent of the dialogue with the first Lutherans.
- Elia Dalla Costa (1872 Villaverla – 1961 Florence), cardinal of the Roman Catholic Church, he became known as "the Cardinal of Charity" for helping save thousands of Italians from execution under the Fascist regime.
- Celso Benigno Luigi Costantini (3 April 1876 Castions di Zoppola – 17 October 1958, Rome), Catholic Bishop, Cardinal, and Apostolic Chancellor
- Bartolomeo Cristofori (4 May 1655 Padua – 27 January 1731) was a maker of musical instruments, generally regarded as the inventor of the piano.
- Damiano Cunego (born 19 September 1981, Cerro Veronese), province of Verona is an Italian professional road bicycle racer.
- Enrico Dandolo (c. 1107 – 1205), Doge of Venice from 1192 until his death; despite being aged, blind, and excommunicated, he led the troops which conquered Constantinople.
- Eugene IV born "Gabriele Condulmer" (1383 Venice – 23 February 1447 Rome), pope from 3 March 1431 to 23 February 1447.
- Federico Faggin (born 1 December 1941), physicist and electrical engineer considered to be one of the inventors of the microprocessor.
- Gaius Valerius Flaccus (Setinus Balbus) (born Padua - c. AD 90), Roman poet of the "Silver Age," wrote the Latin epic poem Argonautica, a member of the College of Fifteen which had charge of the Sibylline books
- Marcantonio Flaminio (1498 Serravalle – 1550), Renaissance Humanist and secretary of Cardinal Pole at the Council of Trent.
- Venantius Honorius Clementianus Fortunatus (c. 530 – 540 near Valdobbiadene – c. 609 Poitiers) Latin poet and hymnodist, bishop of Poitiers (600–609).

== G–L ==
- Andrea Gabrieli (c. 1510 (Venice) – late 1586 (Venice)) was a late Renaissance composer and organist, the first internationally renowned member of the Venetian School of composers who spread the Venetian style in Italy as well as in Germany.
- Giovanni Gabrieli (c. 1554–1557 (Venice) – 12 August 1612 (Venice)), composer and organist whose works represent best of the Venetian School; nephew of Andrea Gabrieli.
- Baldassarre Galuppi (18 October 1706 – 3 January 1785), was a composer from Venice, noted for his operas, and particularly opera buffa.
- Sonia Gandhi (born 9 December 1946 Lusiana, Vicenza, Veneto), influential Indian politician who is President of the Indian National Congress and widow of former Indian Prime-minister Rajiv Gandhi.
- Giorgio Giaretta (born 6 September 1912), former footballer for Juventus and Calcio Padova
- Giorgione (c. 1477 – 1510) is the familiar name of Giorgio Barbarelli da Castelfranco, one of the seminal artists of the High Renaissance in Venice.
- Carlo Goldoni (25 February 1707 – 6 February 1793), Along with Luigi Pirandello, Goldoni is probably the most famous name in Italian theatre, in his country and abroad.
- Gregory XII born "Angelo Correr", in Venice, died (18 October 1417 Rome), pope from 1406 to 1415 during the Great Western Schism.
- Gregory XVI born "Bartolomeo Alberto Cappellari" (18 September 1765 Belluno – 1 June 1846), a Camaldolese monk, reigned as pope from 1831 to 1846.
- Luigi Groto, also called Cieco d'Adria or Cieco D'Hadria (the blind man of Adria) (born 7 September 1541, died 13 December 1585), a blind Italian poet, lutenist, playwright and actor.
- Terence Hill, (born 29 March 1939), actor and film producer best known for starring in Spaghetti Westerns.
- John Paul I, (in Latin Ioannes Paulus PP. I), born "Albino Luciani" (17 October 1912, Forno di Canale, (Province of Belluno) – 28 September 1978, Rome), reigned as pope and as sovereign of Vatican City from 26 August 1978, to 28 September 1978.
- Titus Livius known as Livy in English (c. 59 BC at Padua – 17 AD) wrote a monumental history of Rome, Ab Urbe Condita, from its founding (traditionally dated to 753 BC) through the reign of Augustus.
- Pietro Longhi (5 November 1701 Venice – 8 May 1785), was a painter of contemporary scenes of life.

== M–O ==
- Daniele Manin (13 May 1804 (Venice) – 22 September 1857 (Paris)), patriot and statesman who led Venice in an effort to assert independence from the Austro-Hungarian Empire from 1848 to 1849.
- Ludovico Manin (14 May 1725 – 24 October 1802), last Doge of Venice.
- Andrea Mantegna (c. 1431, Isola di Cartura now Isola Mantegna (Padua), Italy – 13 September 1506, Mantua) was a major Renaissance artist.
- Benedetto Marcello (born 31 July – 1 August 1686 in Venice – died 24 July 1739 in Brescia) was a composer, writer, advocate, magistrate, and teacher.
- Alberto Martini (24 November 1876 Oderzo – died 8 November 1954, in Milan) was an Italian painter, engraver, illustrator and graphic designer. Critics have described Martini's range of work from "elegant and epic" to "grotesque and macabre" and consider him one of the precursors of Surrealism.
- Luigi Meneghello (16 February 1922 – 26 June 2007) was an Italian contemporary writer and scholar.
- Dino Meneghin (born Alano di Piave 18 January 1950), Italian former basketball player. He was considered the best player for his country for decades, and, for several years, also the best in Europe.
- Giovanni Miani (1810 Rovigo – 1872 Mombutta), patriot who took part in the defense of Venice against the Austrians in 1849; explorer of the upper Nile in Africa, director of zoological museum in Khartoum.
- Germano Mosconi (1932 San Bonifacio), journalist
- Francesco Morosini (1618 Venice – 1694 Nauplia), Doge of Venice, called "il Peloponnesiaco" for his reconquest of Greece and defence of it against the Ottoman Turks.
- Sergio Rossetti Morosini (1953 Venice – ) Author, painter, sculptor, and independent filmmaker who lives and works in New York City. He sculpted the bust of Michelangelo on the façade of the National Arts Club in New York City.
  He was also the first to observe that in 1511, Titian described the volume in a two-dimensional fresco painting, Miracle of the Jealous Husband, in the Scuola del Santo, Padua, Italy, by actually sculpting it in relief rather than describing it illusionistically.
- Luigi Nono (born 29 January 1924, in Venice; died 8 May 1990, in Venice) was a composer of classical music and intellectual, one of the most important composers of the 20th century.

== P–R ==
- Luigi Padovese (31 March 1947, Milan – 3 June 2010, Iskenderun), Roman Catholic titular bishop of Monteverde and the vicar apostolic of Anatolia in Turkey.
- Publius Clodius Thrasea Paetus (born ? Padua – died AD 66), Roman Senator and Stoic philosopher who protested the abuses of and was subsequently killed by order of Nero.
- Andrea Palladio (30 November 1508 Padua – 19 August 1580 Maser) was a Venetian architect, one of the main architects in the history of Western architecture.
- Marco Paolini (born 5 March 1956), Stage actor, theatre director, dramaturge and author.
- Riccardo Patrese (born 17 April 1954), former Formula One (F1) racing driver, from 1977 to 1993.
- Paul II born "Pietro Barbo" (1417 Venice – 1471 Rome), pope from 30 August 1464 to 26 July 1471.
- Quintus Asconius Pedianus (c. 9 BC Padua – c. AD 76 Rome), a Roman historian and essayist
- Federica Pellegrini (born 5 August 1988 Mirano, province of Venezia), she is currently the women's 400m freestyle (long course) and 200m freestyle world record holder.
- Alessandro del Piero (born 9 November 1974), footballer (soccer player) from Conegliano, Treviso.
- Giovanni Battista Piranesi (4 October 1720 in Mogliano Veneto (near Treviso) – 9 November 1778 in Rome) was famous for his etchings of Rome and of fictitious and atmospheric "prisons" (Carceri d'Invenzione).
- Pius X (Latin: Pius PP. X), born "Giuseppe Melchiorre Sarto" (2 June 1835 Riese, (Province of Treviso) – 26 August 1914, Rome), reigned as pope from 1903 to 1914 and canonized in 1954.
- Marcus Vitruvius Pollio (c. 80/70 BC Verona? – c. 25 BC) was a Roman writer, soldier, architect, and engineer.
- Filippo Pozzato (born 10 September 1981), professional cyclist.
- Severino Poletto (born 18 March 1933, Salgareda, Treviso), archbishop of Turin since June 1999, cardinal of the Roman Catholic Church
- Marco Polo (15 September 1254 Venice – 8 January 1324 Venice) was a Venetian merchant and explorer of Persia, India, and China who wrote of his travels.
- Lorenzo Da Ponte born "Emmanuele Conegliano,"(10 March 1749 Ceneda (Vittorio Veneto) – 17 August 1838, New York), librettist to Mozart, first professor of Italian language and literature at Columbia College, helped establish an Opera House in Manhattan.
- Davide Rebellin (born 9 August 1971) is a professional cyclist.
- Renzo Rosso (born 1955), clothing designer and founder of the Diesel clothing company.
- Carlo Rovelli (Verona, 3 May 1956), theoretical physicist, philosopher and writer.

== S–Z ==
- Antonio Salieri (18 August 1750 Legnago (Province of Verona) – 7 May 1825), composer and conductor who became the Austrian imperial kapellmeister from 1788 to 1824.
- Francesca Segat (born 21 January 1983 Vittorio Veneto, Treviso), swimmer who has competed and won medals for Italy in International Competitions.
- Sara Simeoni (born 19 April 1953) is a former high jumper, who won a gold medal at the 1980 Summer Olympics and set two times a world record in her speciality.
- Mario Rigoni Stern (1 November 1921 – 16 June 2008 from Asiago) was an Italian author and World War II veteran, as well as a Nazi concentration camp survivor.
- Tintoretto (real name Jacopo Robusti; 1518 – 31 May 1594) was one of the greatest painters of the Venetian school and probably the last great painter of Italian Renaissance.
- Titian or Tiziano Vecellio (c. 1488/1490 – 27 August 1576) was the leader of the 16th-century Venetian school of the Italian Renaissance.
- GianMario Tondato Da Ruos: professionally acclaimed administratore delegato Autogrill SpA, a Benetton family holding.
- Totila (early 6th century AD, Treviso – 552 Taginae) was king of the Ostrogoths, military genius, killed by forces of Justinian at Battle of Taginae
- Tyrannius Rufinus (c.340/5 Concordia Sagittaria – 410 Trinacria, Sicily) was a Catholic priest of Aquileia, translator, and Church Father
- Iacopo Vittorelli (10 November 1749 Bassano del Grappa – 12 June 1835 Bassano del Grappa) was a well-known poet, librettist, and scholar.
- Antonio Vivaldi (4 March 1678, Venice – 28 July (or 27), 1741, Vienna), nicknamed Il Prete Rosso ("The Red Priest") was a priest and baroque music composer, as well as a famous violinist.
- Ermanno Wolf-Ferrari (12 January 1876 – 21 January 1948, born and died in Venice), composer son of German painter August Wolf and Venetian Emilia Ferrari. He is mostly remembered for his lively comic operas which often recall the opera buffa of the 18th century and are generally thought of as the finest of his time.
- Luca Zaia (born 27 March 1968) is an Italian politician, member of Liga Veneta–Lega Nord.
- Andrea Zanzotto (born 10 October 1921) Pieve di Soligo, (province of Treviso, is one of the most important Italian contemporary Poets.
- Gianfranco Zigoni (born 25 November 1944, in Oderzo) is an Italian former football striker. Nicknamed Zigogol by his fans, he played with several major Serie A throughout his career in the 1960s and the 1970s, including Juventus and AS Roma, being famous for his colourful style.

== See also ==
- List of Italians
