= Zoppola =

Municipality in Friuli-Venezia Giulia, Italy

Zoppola Sopula (Friulian)
- Comune
- Comune di Zoppola
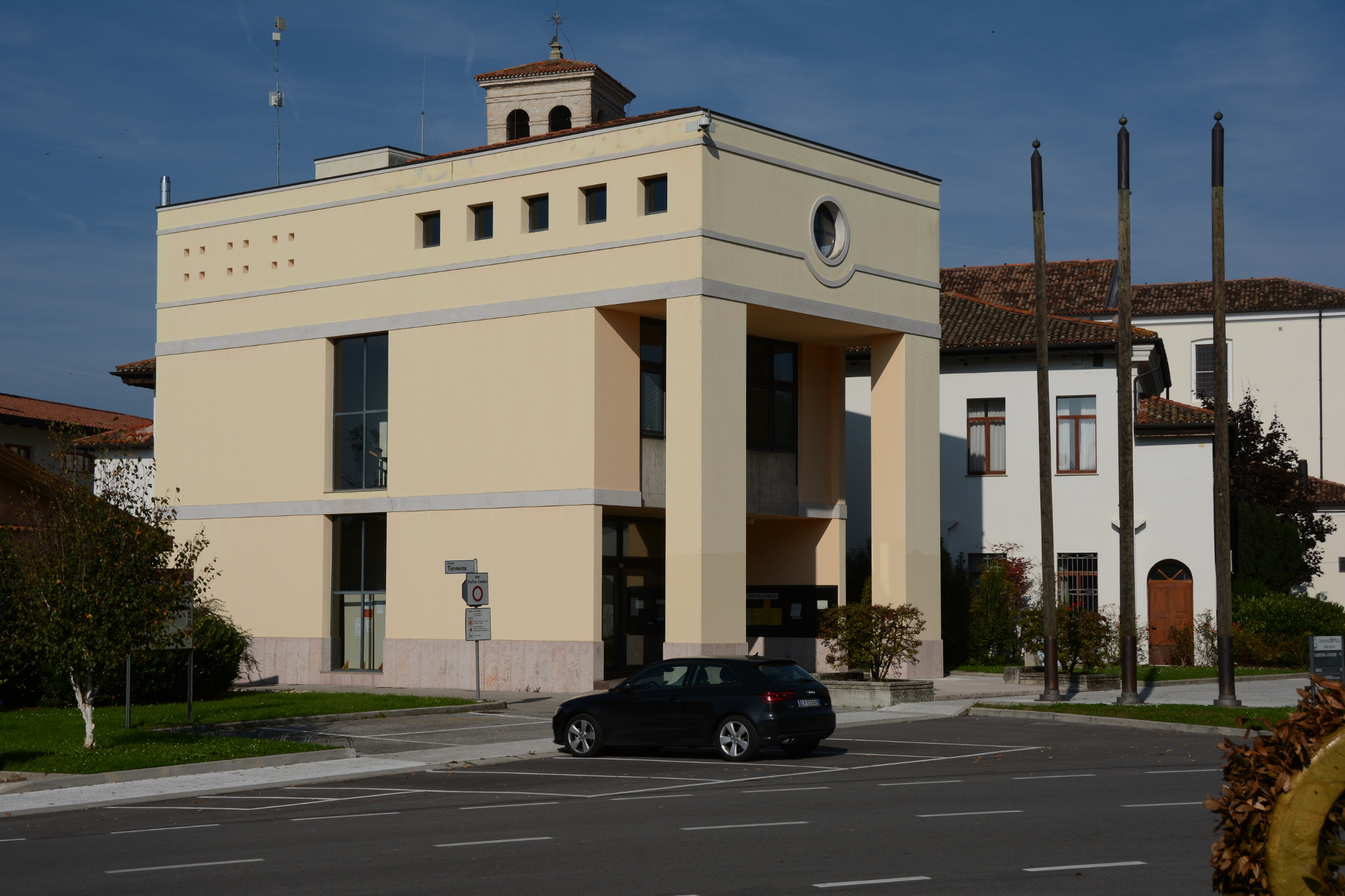
- Town hall.

- Coat of arms

- Location within Italy Location within Friuli-Venezia Giulia
- Coordinates: 45°58′N 12°46′E
- Country: Italy
- Region: Friuli-Venezia Giulia
- Province: Pordenone (PN)
- Frazioni: Castions, Cusano, Murlis, Orcenico Inferiore, Orcenico Superiore, Ovoledo, Poincicco

Government
  - Mayor: Francesca Papais

Area
  - Total: 45.4 km^{2} (17.5 sq mi)
- Elevation: 36 m (118 ft)

Population (April 2022)
  - Total: 8,297
  - Density: 183/km^{2} (473/sq mi)
- Demonym: Zoppolani
- Time zone: UTC+1 (CET)
  - Summer (DST): UTC+2 (CEST)
- Postal code: 33080
- Dialing code: 0434
- Patron saint: Saint Martin
- Saint day: November 11
- Website: Official website

Zoppola (Standard Friulian: Çopule, Western Friulian: Sopula) is a comune (municipality) in the Regional decentralization entity of Pordenone in Italian region of Friuli-Venezia Giulia, located about 90 kilometres (56 miles) northwest of Trieste and about 9 kilometres (6 miles) east of Pordenone.

The Italian poet Pier Paolo Pasolini wrote a poem called Le gioie di Orcenico ("The joys of Orcenico"); he had lived in Casarsa della Delizia, not far from Zoppola's frazione (borough) of Orcenico, from 1943 to 1949.

== Main sights ==
- Castello di Zoppola, owned by the patriarch of Aquileia and Cardinal Antonio Panciera. The inner court has frescoes by Pomponio Amalteo
- San Martino church
- San Michele, church in the frazione of Ovoledo, with 16th-century frescoes and paintings
- Sant'Andrea church at Castions, with two canvases by Amalteo and one by Antonio Carneo

== Twin towns and sister cities ==
Zoppola is twinned with:

- Tonneins, France, since 1981
- Sankt Georgen am Längsee, Austria, since 1996

== People ==
- Celso Benigno Luigi Costantini
