= Giaretta =

Giaretta is an Italian surname. Notable people with the surname include:

- Ariovaldo Antonio Giaretta (born 1966), Brazilian herpetologist
- Diego Giaretta (born 1983), Brazilian footballer
- Giorgio Giaretta (1912–1981), Italian footballer
- Paolo Giaretta (born 1947), Italian politician
