= Castello di Zoppola =

Italian castle

Coordinates: 45.9663°N 12.7757°E

The Castle of Zoppola is an 11th-century castle in Zoppola, in the Province of Pordenone in the Italian region of Friuli-Venezia Giulia.

In 1103, the castle was given to the Zoppola family. By 1405, it came to be owned by the patriarch of Aquileia, Antonio Panciera, who later became Cardinal. It still belongs to the family. The main tower was partially rebuilt in 1900, but was broken again in the 1976 Friuli earthquake. The castle was once surrounded by a triple ring of walls with moats.

In the interior courtyard are frescoes by Pomponio Amalteo. The interior has frescoes by Giovanni Battista Tiepolo, Pietro Longhi, and Giovanni da Udine (attributed).
