= Ridotto =

Historical building in Venice, Italy

The Ridotto (Italian: il Ridotto, lit. 'the retired place') was a wing of Venice's Palazzo Dandolo near the church of San Moisè. In 1638, it was converted at the behest of Venice's city leaders into a government-owned gambling-house. Il Ridotto was the site of the West's first public, legal mercantile casino, opening several centuries after some gambling establishments in China.

== Etymology and usage ==
The Italian word ridotto (plural: ridotti) comes from the perfect passive participle of the Latin verb reducere ('to draw back'), and originally meant 'a retired place', later meaning 'a place where people meet together'. It also referred to several illegal, privately owned gambling clubs that offered games of chance to members of Venice's nobility in the city's Rialto District. These clubs came into being after the Venetian authorities attempted to ban games of chance that had spontaneously sprung up in the city's streets. Realizing it could not effectively prevent citizens from wagering on dice and card games, the Great Council of Venice opened its "Ridotto" in 1638 on the occasion of the city's annual Spring Carnival.

== Casino era ==
The Ridotto was Europe's first state-sanctioned casino. Through combining the interests of mercantile gamblers (who profited from the games) and government authorities (who sought to legitimize the gambling for purposes of public order and enhancing government revenues), the Ridotto was an early model for the use of gambling revenues to support state finance.

According to the casino's original charter, access to Il Ridotto was open to the public. However, due to its high stakes and formal dress code, only nobles could afford to play at the casino's tables; one such discriminating injunction, for instance, was that players had to wear three-cornered hats and masks in order to participate in Il Ridotto's games; less affluent Venetians were thereby prohibited from making wagers at the casino's tables.

As for games, Il Ridotto is known to have offered biribi and basetta. Biribi was a lottery-like game in which players placed bets on one of 70 possible outcomes. A casino employee, the "banker", would then draw a number from a bag, and anyone who had bet on that number would win the game's pot. The game featured a built-in vigorish whereby a winning player only collected 64 times his original bet; considering that every outcome in the game gave only roughly a 1 percent chance of winning for any given bet, this meant that the house at Il Ridotto enjoyed an 8.6% vigorish on the game (average payout = 64*(1/70) = 91.4%).

The most popular game at Il Ridotto, however, was the card game basetta. This game was a cross between blackjack, poker, and gin rummy and offered winning players 60 times their wagers in payout. In later years, it was replaced by the card game faro, which would gain even greater popularity in the U.S.

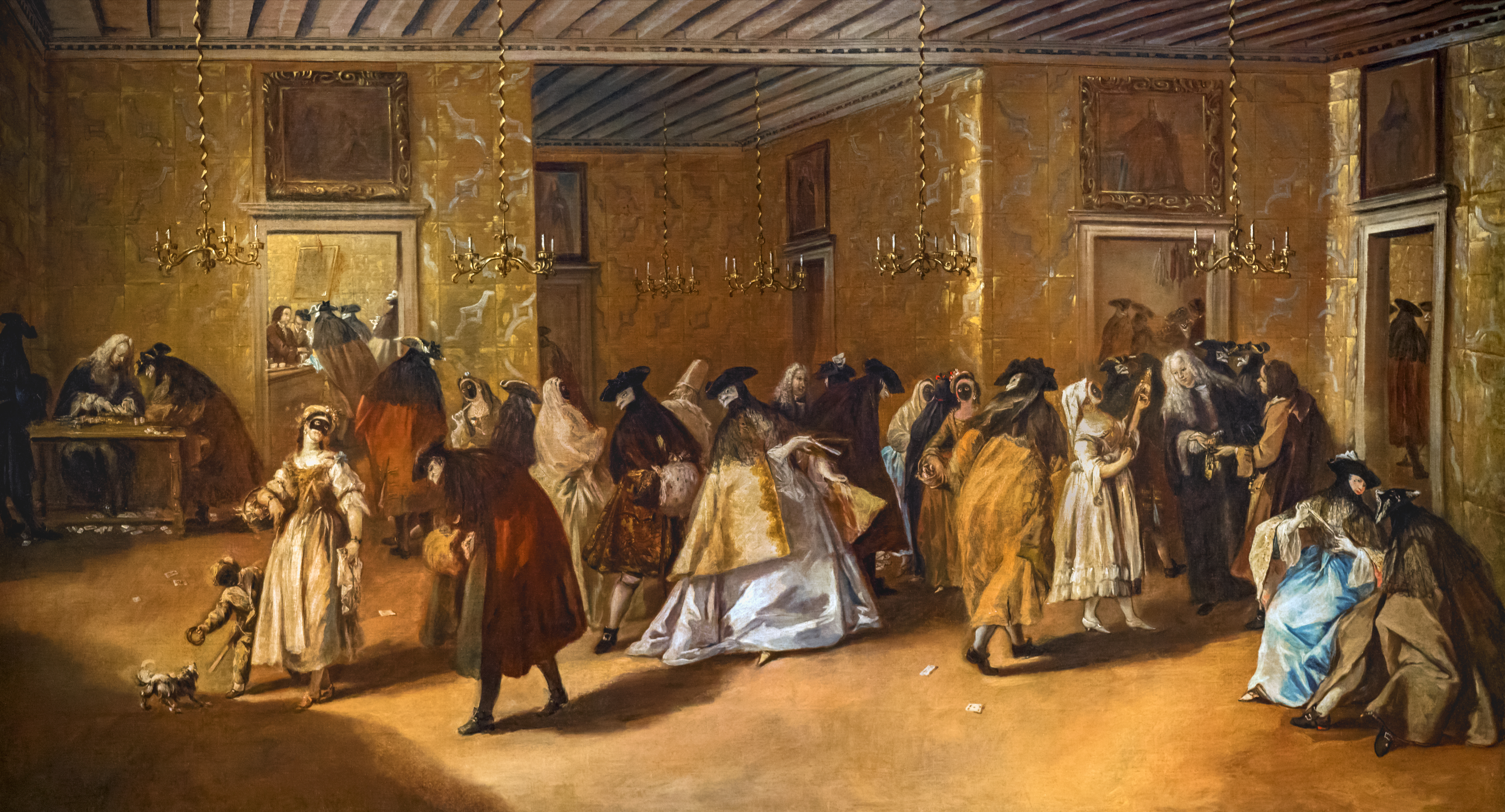
Il Ridotto di palazzo Dandolo a San Moise by Francesco Guardi

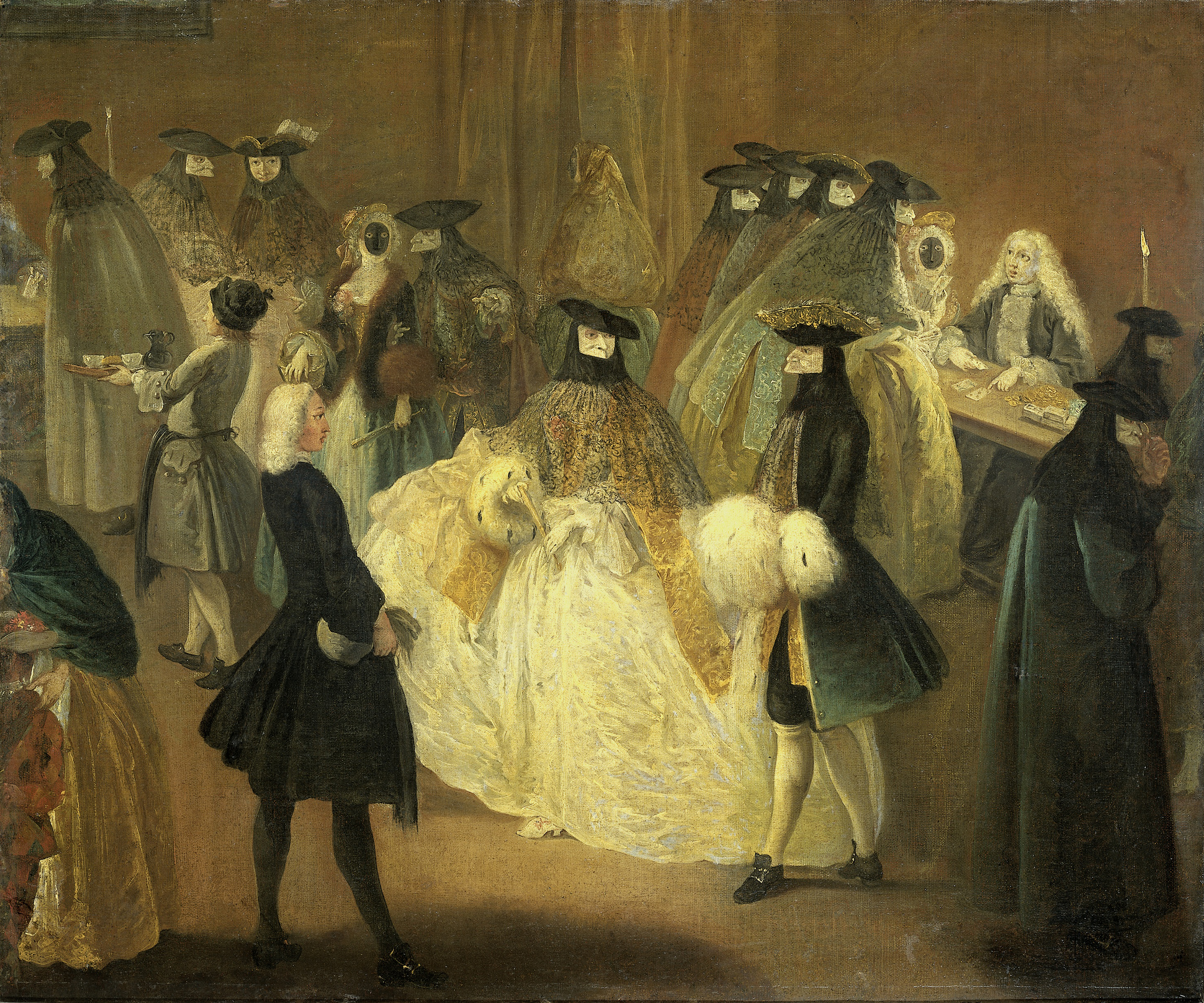
Il Ridotto by Pietro Longhi

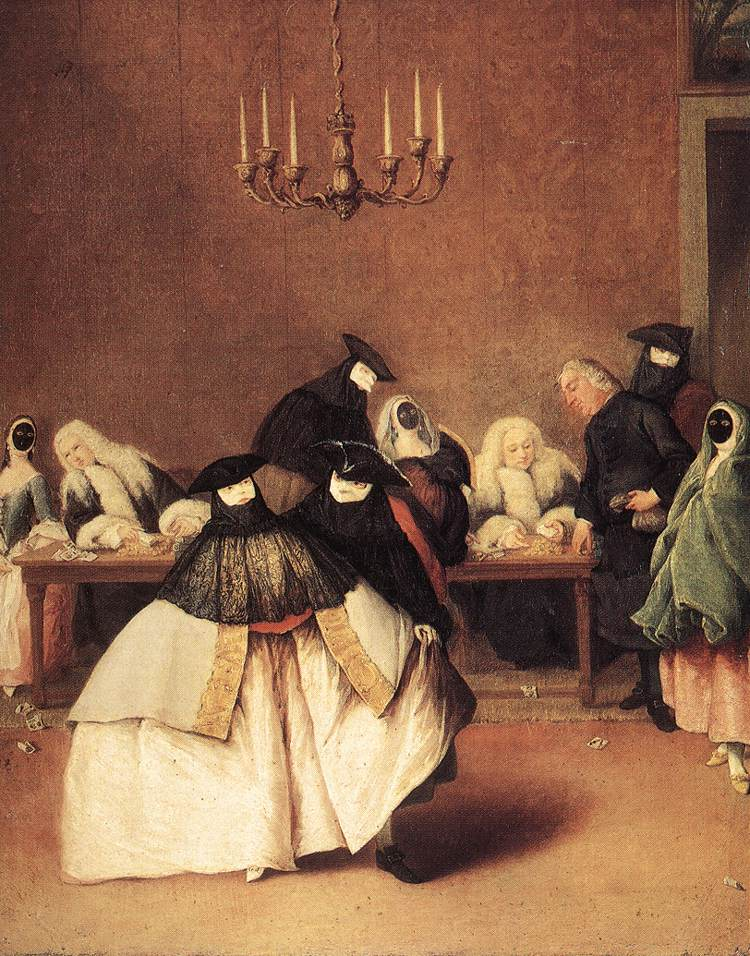
Il Ridotto by Longhi

== Architecture ==
The wing of the San Moisè Palace in which the Ridotto originally operated was four stories tall and featured a long entrance hall, dining rooms and other fineries like work from artist Gerolamo Colonna. Its gaming tables, meanwhile, were primarily situated in its upper floors.

== Closing ==
In 1774, Venetian reformer Giorgio Pisani proposed the city close the Ridotto "to preserve the piety, sound discipline and moderate behavior". Pisani's motion passed by an overwhelming majority and the casino closed its doors the same year.

== Sources ==
- Blackburn, Ernest Murray (1911). A Study of Words.
