= Girolamo Amalteo =

Italian painter

Girolamo Amalteo was a 16th-century Italian artist, the brother of Pomponio Amalteo.

== Life ==
Girolamo was the brother of Pomponio Amalteo, an artist born in Motta di Livenza, Veneto, in 1505. He was instructed by Pomponio and gave proofs of a noble genius, which is manifested in his works of design in small pictures, which appeared like miniatures, in several fables executed in fresco, and in altar-pieces which he painted in the church of San Vito al Tagliamento. Ridolfi commends him highly for his spirited manner, and Renaldis says that, in his opinion, if he had lived longer he would have proved no way inferior to the great Pordenone. He flourished in the 16th century, and died when still young. Giulio Cornelio Graziano, in his poem Orlando Santo, calls him "Girolamo Amalteo de vita santa".
