= Louis of Teck =

German prelate, Patriarch of Aquileia

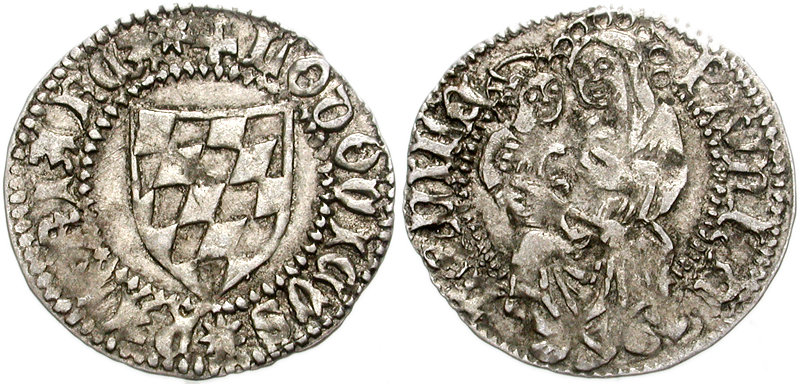
A soldo issued during the reign of Louis in Friuli.

Louis of Teck (Italian: Ludovico di Teck; 1375 - July 1439) was a duke German prelate, who was Patriarch of Aquileia from 1412 until his death.

== Biography ==
Louis of Teck was the last male descendant of the Dukes of Teck in Swabia, born around 1375 to Frederick and Anne of Helfenstein. He matriculated from the Stadium of Padua in 1394 and was awarded citizenship by Francesco Novello da Carrara.

He was elected as patriarch with the help of King Sigismund. During the war with the Republic of Venice which broke out in 1411, he sided for Sigismund, a decision which eventually led to the dissolution of the Aquileian temporal power. In 1418, while most of the Hungarian units were fighting the Ottoman Turks in the Balkans, the Venetians defeated them on the sea and then launched a land offensive against Friuli (the heart of the patriarchate) under Taddeo d'Este and Filippo Arcelli, and the last Aquileian lands in Istria. Capodistria was attacked on 27 August 1418. Aquileia was sacked and Cividale surrendered on 13 July 1419, followed by Sacile on 14 August. Udine, the patriarchate's capital, resisted the troops of Tristano Savorgnan.

Louis received the support of Henry VI of Gorizia. 6,000 patriarchal and Hungarian troops, backed by the Carraresi of Padua and the counts of Oltenburg besieged Cividale for 115 days, but were defeated by a rescue army sent by Venice in December 1419. Henry was captured, while Louis fled to Hungary. The Venetians completed the occupation of Friuli capturing Feltre, Belluno, Portogruaro and Venzone in 1420, while the Cadore and Capodistria surrendered spontaneously.

Louis attempted to invade Friuli in April 1422 with 4,000 men, but was pushed back. Another assault was repelled in September after he had reached Moggio Udinese. His final invasion of 1431 was thwarted by the Venetian condottiero Francesco Bussone, count of Carmagnola.

Louis was a ferocious enemy of Pope Eugenius IV. At the Council of Basel, he proposed that Eugenius was sentenced to death. He also took part in the meeting of German princes at Mainz that elected Amadeus VIII of Savoy as antipope. He died at Basel in July 1439.

== See also ==
- Dukes of Teck

Preceded by Antonio Panciera	Patriarch of Aquileia; 1412–1439	Succeeded by Ludovico Scarampi Mezzarota
