= Gaetano Astolfoni =

Italian painter

Gaetano Astolfoni (Veneto, 18-19th century) was an Italian painter, active from 1820 to 1840 in Venice and Ravenna, painting sacred subjects. Many of his works were academic copies or restorations of antique works.

== Biography ==
He painted an altarpiece of St Francis Xavier for the church of Santo Stefano in Venice, He painted the main altarpiece in the parish church of San Jacopo Apostolo, better known as San Giacomo dall'Orio, He restored a Presentation of the Virgin at the Temple by Giuseppe Salviati at the Frari.

Mostly self trained, Gaetano Astolfoni became a member of the Academy of Fine Arts of Venice, and there exhibited in 1819 a Magdalen. In 1821, 1822, and 1825 he exhibited copies of antique works, including Rembrandt. In 1840 he exhibited a San Giorgio Illuminatore che battezza il Re d'Armenia and in 1841, Gesù che disputa nel tempio.
