= Amalteo =

Italian family

Amalteo is the name of an Italian family belonging to Oderzo, Treviso, several members of whom were distinguished in literature. The best known are three brothers, Geronimo (1507–1574), Giambattista (d. 1573) and Cornelio (1530–1603), whose Latin poems were published in one collection under the title Trium Fratrum Amaltheorum Carmina (Venice, 1627; Amst., 1689). The eldest brother, Geronimo, was a celebrated physician; the second, Giambattista, accompanied a Venetian embassy to England in 1554, and was secretary to Pius IV at the Council of Trent; the third, Cornelio, was a physician and secretary to the Republic of Ragusa.

The painter Pomponio Amalteo, who painted in Oderzo, likely comes from this family.
