= Pietro Longhi =

Italian painter (1701–1785)

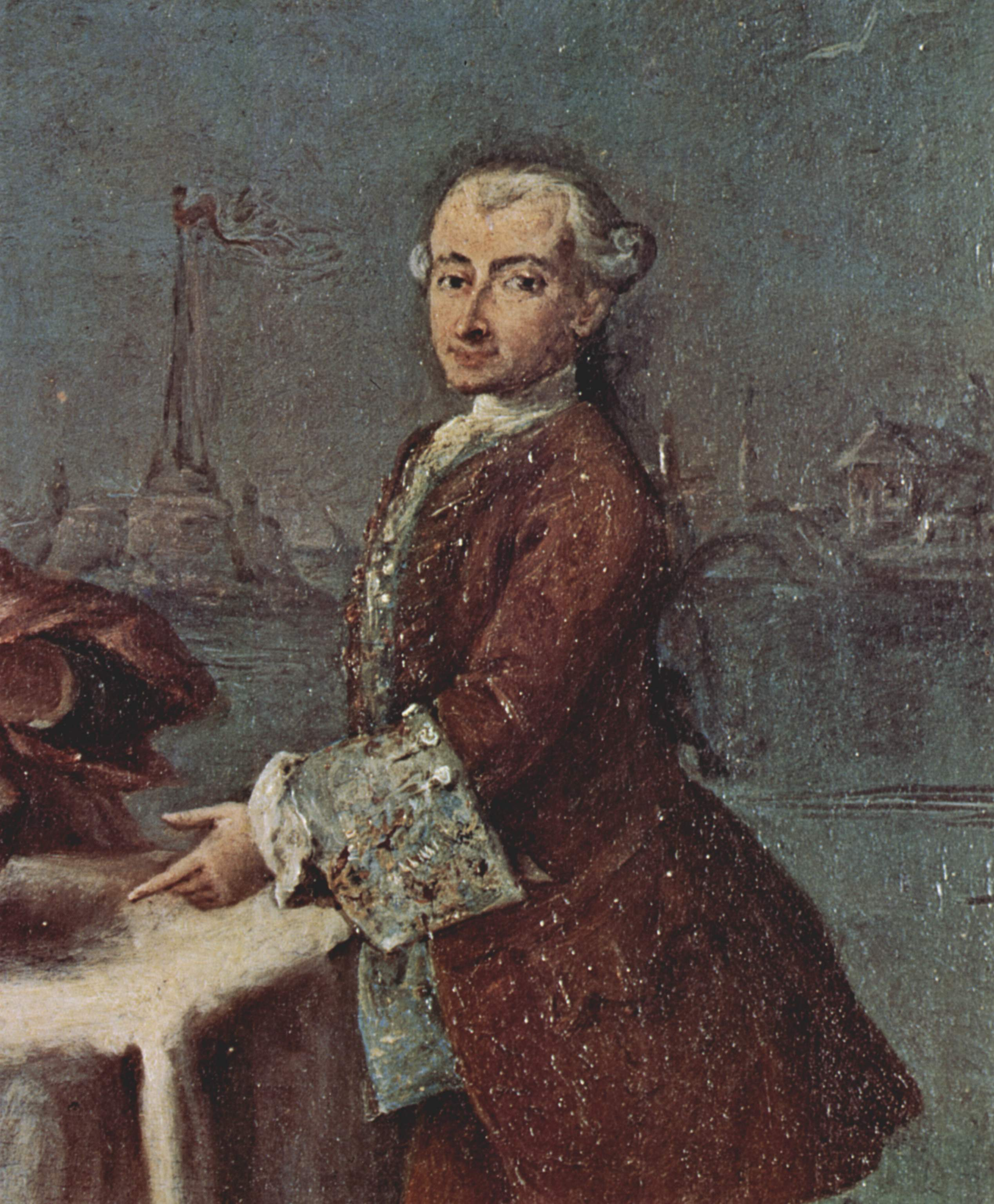
- Self-portrait of Longhi
- Born: 5 November 1701; Venetian Republic
- Died: 8 May 1785 (aged 83); Venetian Republic

Pietro Longhi (5 November 1701 – 8 May 1785) was a Venetian painter of contemporary genre scenes of life.

== Biography ==
Pietro Longhi was born in Venice in the parish of Saint Maria, the first child of the silversmith Alessandro Falca and his wife, Antonia. He adopted the Longhi last name when he began to paint. He was initially taught by the Veronese painter Antonio Balestra, who then recommended the young painter to apprentice with the Bolognese Giuseppe Maria Crespi, who was highly regarded in his day for both religious and genre painting and was influenced by the work of Dutch painters. Longhi returned to Venice before 1732. He was married in 1732 to Caterina Maria Rizzi, by whom he had eleven children (only three of which reached the age of maturity).

Among his early paintings are some altarpieces and religious themes. His first major documented work was an altarpiece for the church of San Pellegrino in 1732. In 1734, he completed frescoes in the walls and ceiling of the hall in Ca' Sagredo, representing the Death of the giants. In the late 1730s, he began to specialize in the small-scale genre works that would lead him to be viewed in the future as the Venetian William Hogarth, painting subjects and events of everyday life in Venice. Longhi's gallant interior scenes reflect the 18th century's turn towards the private and the bourgeois, and were extremely popular.

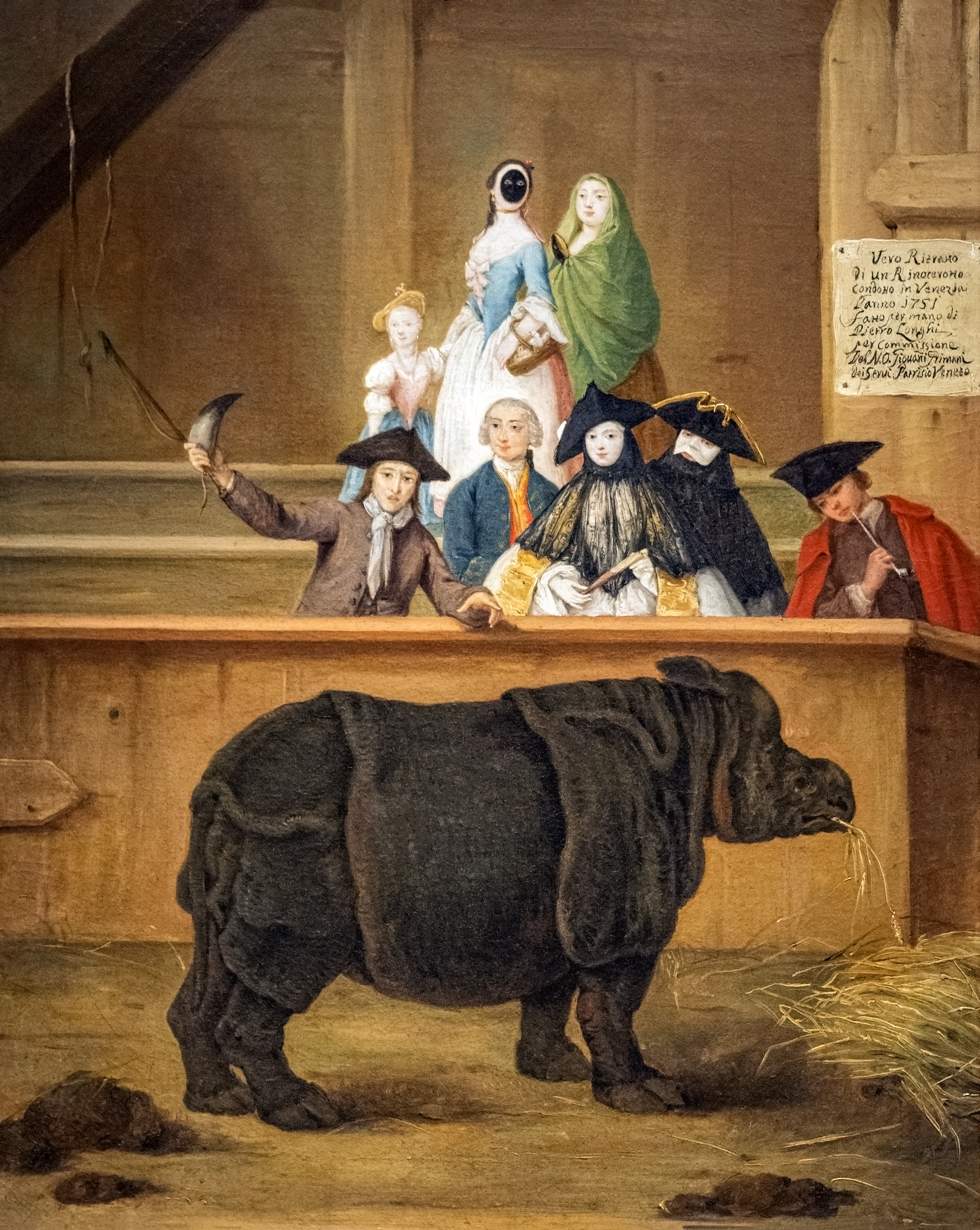
Clara the rhinoceros by Pietro Longhi (1751), Ca' Rezzonico version

Many of his paintings show Venetians at play, such as the depiction of the crowd of genteel citizens awkwardly gawking at a freakish Indian rhinoceros. This painting, on display at the National Gallery in London, chronicles Clara the rhinoceros brought to Europe in 1741 by a Dutch sea captain and impresario from Leyden, Douvemont van der Meer. This rhinoceros was exhibited in Venice in 1751. There are two versions of this painting, nearly identical except for the unmasked portraits of two men in the Ca' Rezzonico version. Ultimately, there may be a punning joke to the painting, since the young man on the left holds the sawed-off horn (metaphor for cuckoldry) of the animal. Perhaps this explains the difference between the unchaperoned women.

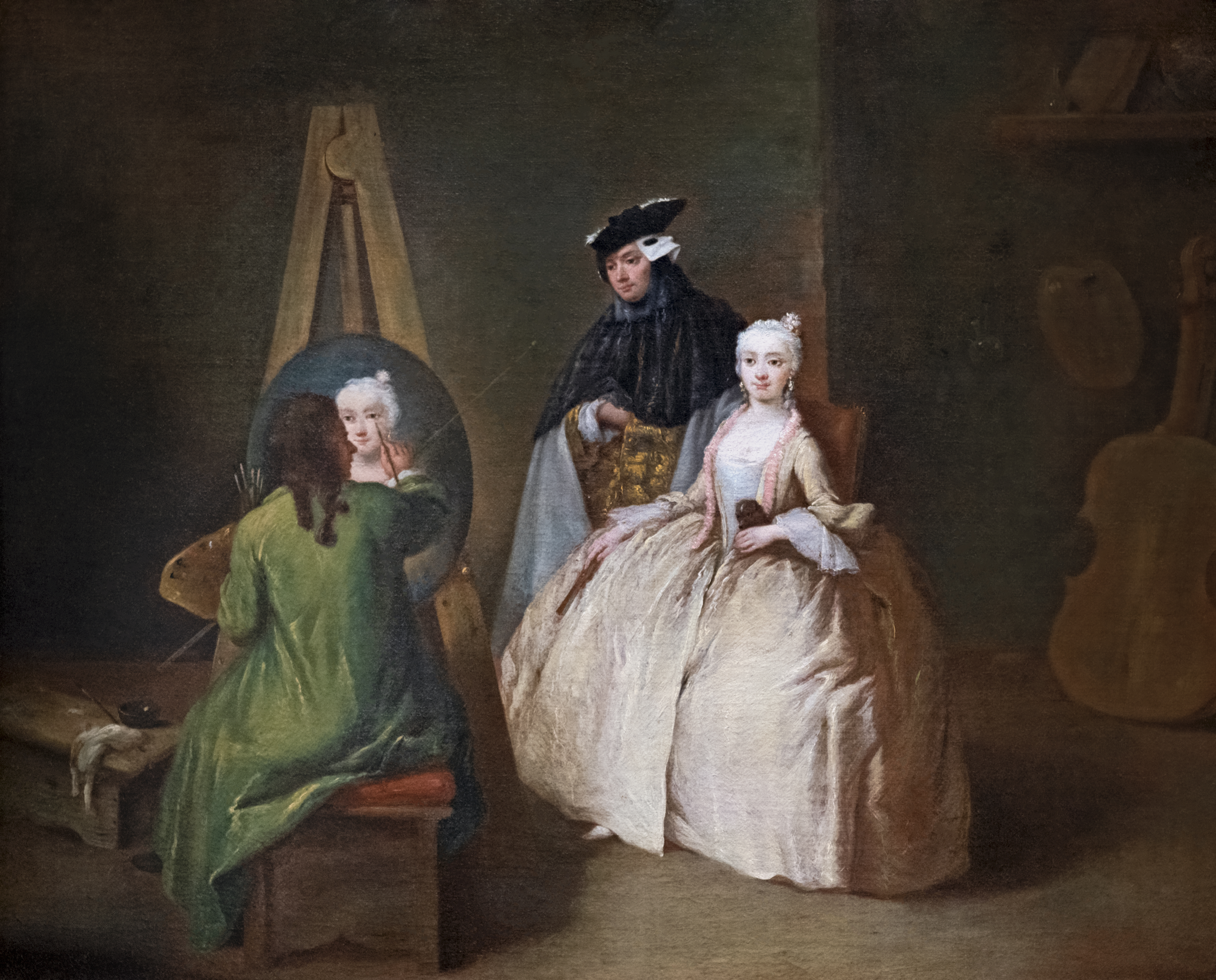
L'atelier del pittore (between 1740 and 1746)

Other paintings chronicle the daily activities, such as the gambling parlours (Ridotti) that proliferated in the 18th century. Nearly half of the figures in his genre paintings are faceless, hidden behind Venetian Carnival masks. In some, the insecure or naive posture and circumstance, the puppet-like delicacy of the persons, seem to suggest a satirical perspective of the artists toward his subjects. That this puppet-like quality was an intentional conceit on Longhi's part is attested by the skilful rendering of figures in his earlier history paintings and in his drawings. Longhi's many drawings, typically in black chalk or pencil heightened with white chalk on colored paper, were often done for their own sake, rather than as studies for paintings.

In the 1750s, Longhi—like Crespi before him—was commissioned to paint seven canvases documenting the seven Catholic sacraments. These are now in Pinacoteca Querini Stampalia along with his scenes from the hunt (Caccia).

From 1763, Longhi was Director of the Academy of Drawing and Carving. From this period, he began to work extensively with portraiture, and was actively assisted by his son, Alessandro. Longhi died on 8 May 1785, following a short illness.

== Legacy ==
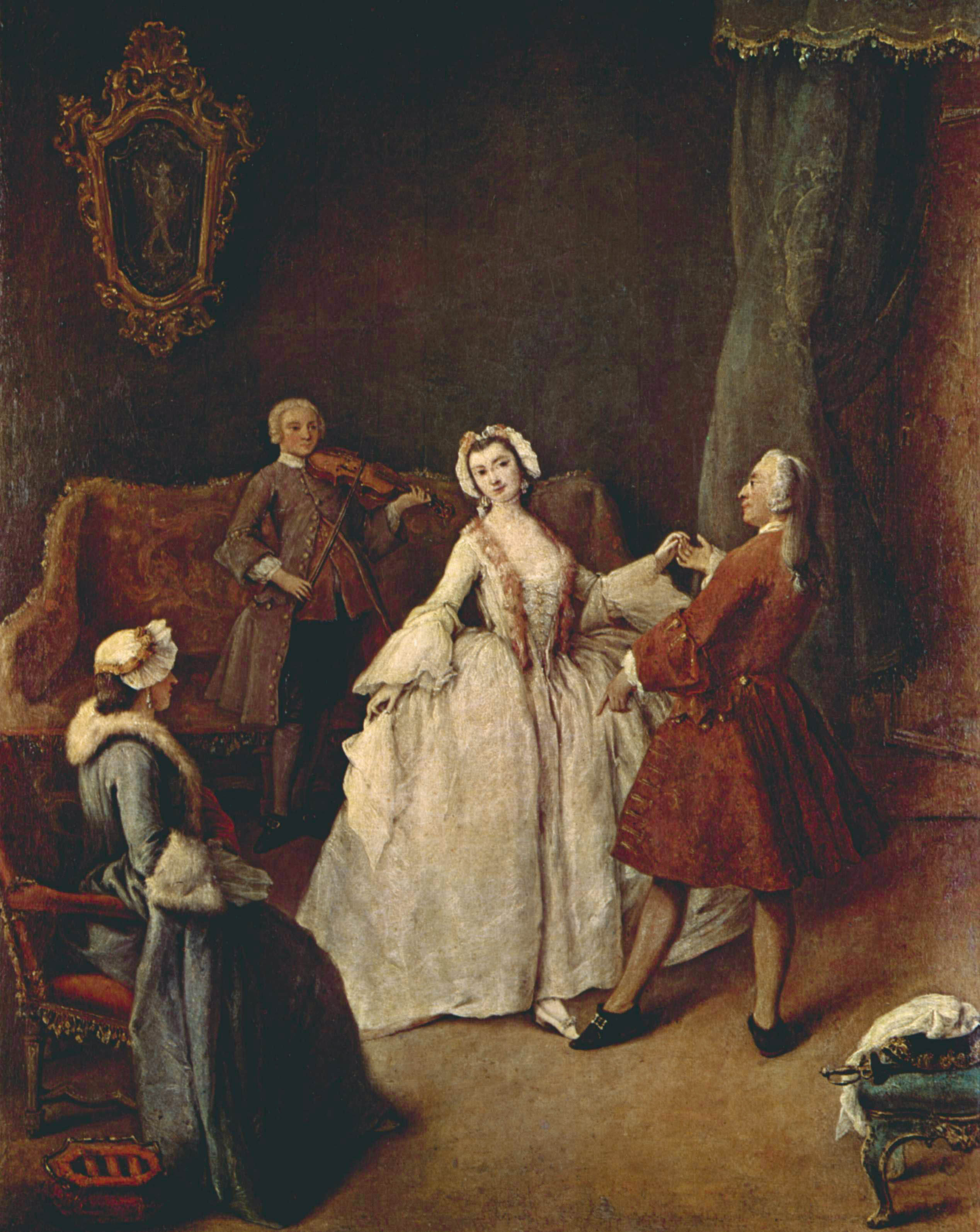
La lezione di danza (The Dancing Lesson) (c. 1741). Gallerie dell'Accademia, Venice

Celebrated genre canvases were produced by other contemporary artists in Italy, such as Gaspare Traversi and Giuseppe Maria Crespi. Longhi had not only departed the world of grand mythology of history that often allured the Venetian nobility, but also taken residence in its intimate present, as few painters in Venice had ever done. If Canaletto and Guardi are our window to the external rituals of the republic, Longhi is our window to what happened inside rooms. The critic Bernard Berenson states that:

Longhi painted for the picture-loving Venetians their own lives in all their ordinary domestic and fashionable phases. In the hair-dressing scenes, we hear the gossip of the periwigged barber; in the dressmaking scenes, the chatter of the maid; in the dancing-school, the pleasant music of the violin. There is no tragic note anywhere. Everybody dresses, dances, makes bows, takes coffee, as if there were nothing else in the world that wanted doing. A tone of high courtesy, of great refinement, coupled with an all-pervading cheerfulness, distinguishes Longhi's pictures from the works of Hogarth, at once so brutal and so full of presage of change.

== Masks ==
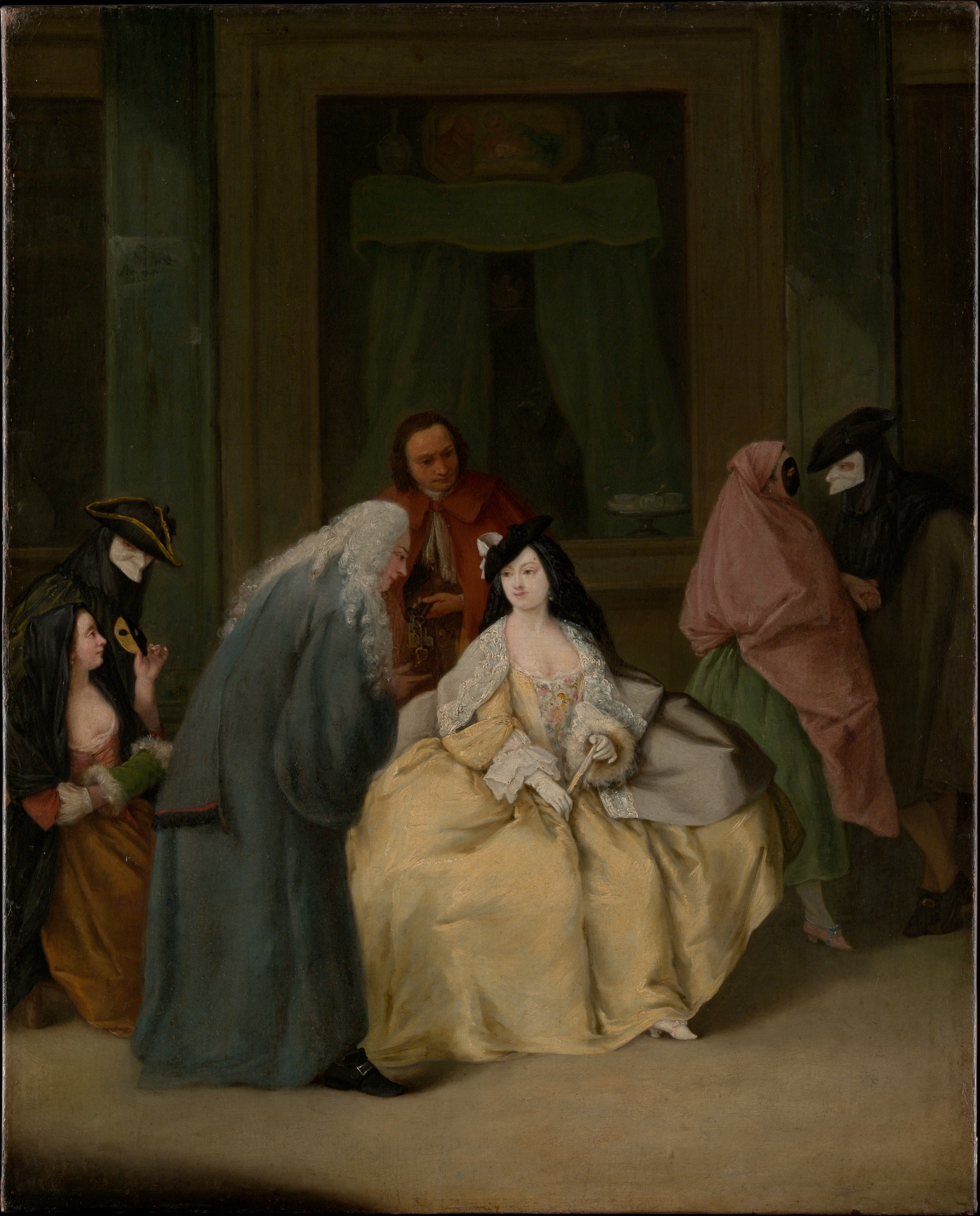
The Meeting (1746)

In numerous paintings, Longhi depicts masked figures engaging in various acts from gambling to flirting. For example, in the foreground of Longhi's painting The Meeting of the Procuratore and His Wife is a woman being greeted by a man who is presumed to be her husband. The setting is a type of gathering place, usually for masked people to engage in private matters such as romantic encounters. The woman and her husband are unmasked, but on the left, a seated woman is unmasking herself to address a masked man leaning over her shoulder. This act may suggest that the woman's Moretta mask, which lacks an opening for the mouth, requires her to unmask herself in order to speak; another interpretation is that the woman is interested enough in the masked man to remove her mask in order to reveal her true identity to him.

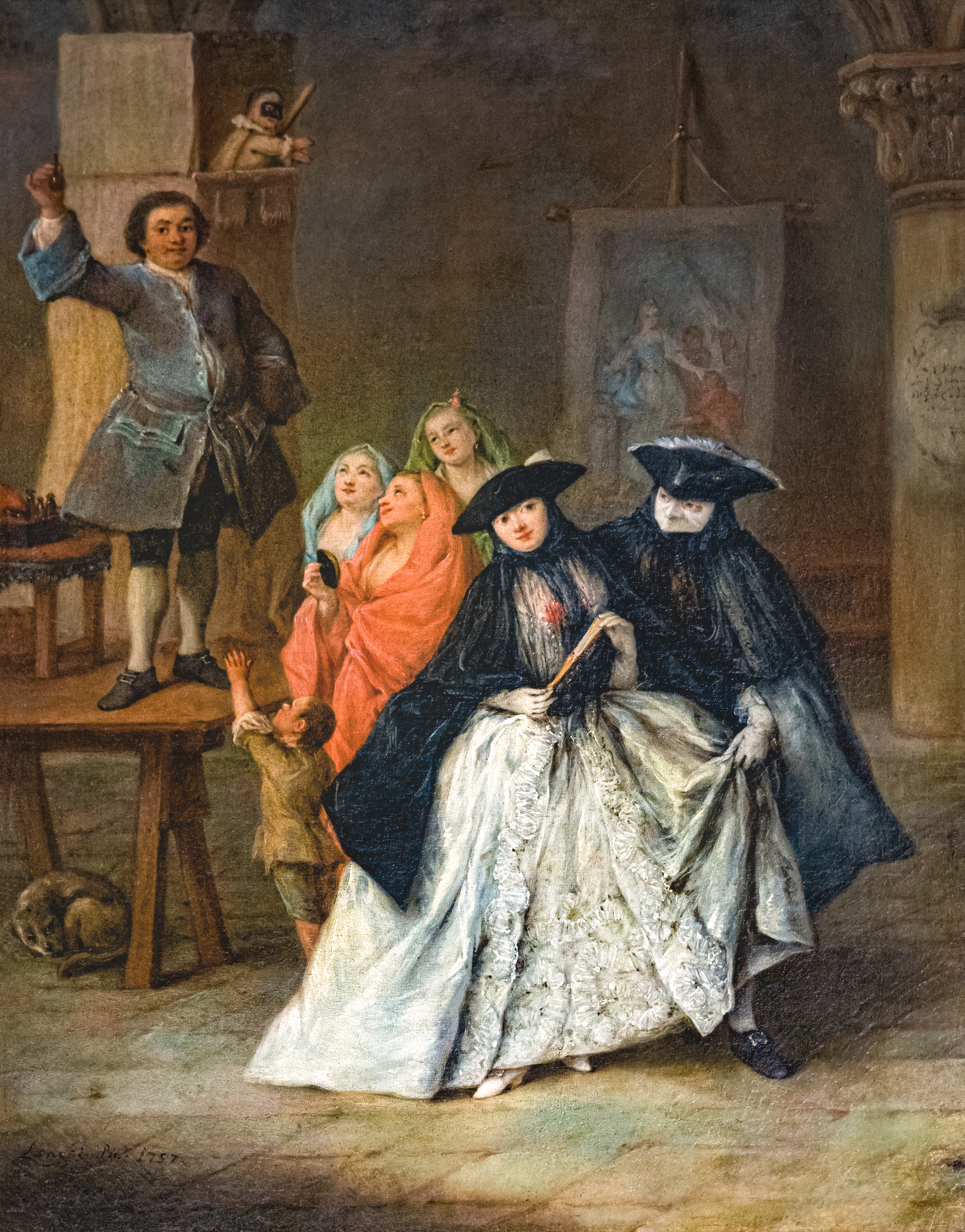
The Charlatan (1757), Venice version

In The Charlatan (1757), the charlatan is relegated to the background, where he stands on top of a table surrounded by admiring women and a young boy. In the foreground, a woman seems to fiddle with her fan and slyly look at a masked man who lifts part of her dress. There is a sense of duality as the ordinary event of the man on the top of the table is contrasted with the reality of Venetian life represented by the couple indulging themselves; this is similar to the duality of the mask used by his subjects to hide physically, but to expose their unconscious desires.

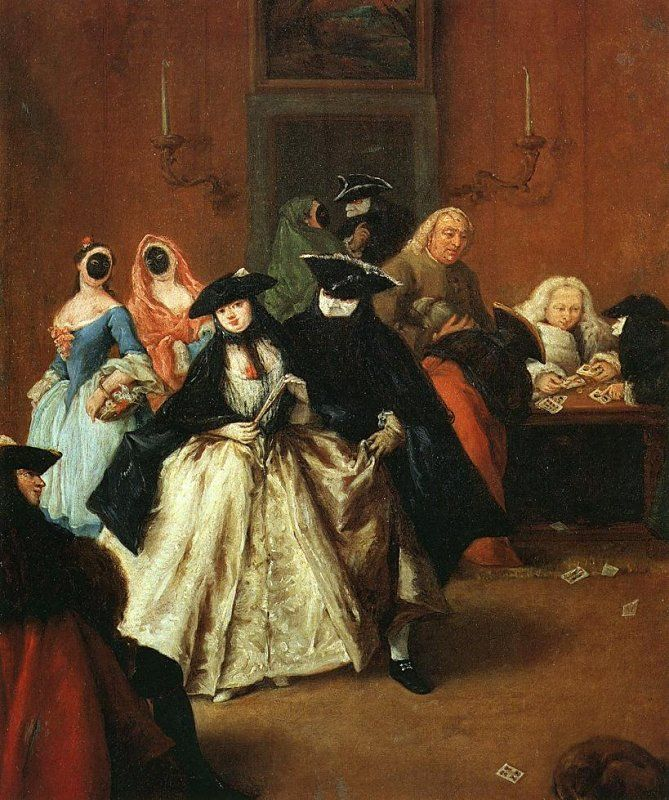
The Ridotto in Venice (c. 1750s)

In The Ridotto in Venice (ca. 1750s), Longhi depicts one of the main gambling halls in Venice. The scene is crowded with masked and unmasked figures. The focal point in this work depicts a now-familiar scene of a shy woman and an aggressive man who lifts her dress. Repeating the figures of the flirtatious couple, Longhi displays the Ridotto as a place where the social elite— who would not exhibit such behaviour in public nor unmasked—would abandon all inhibitions and pursue their actual desires.

== Gallery ==
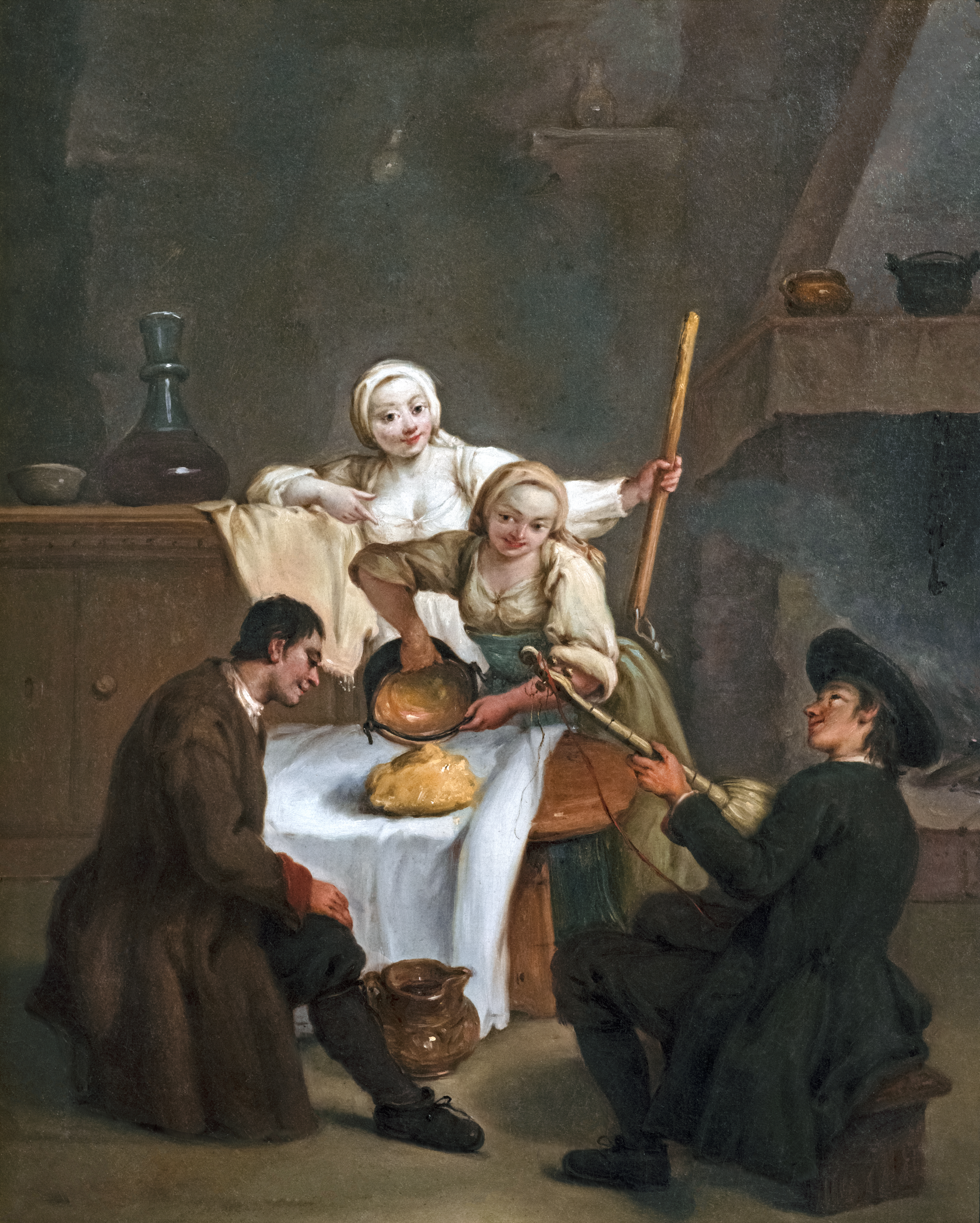
La Polenta (1740)

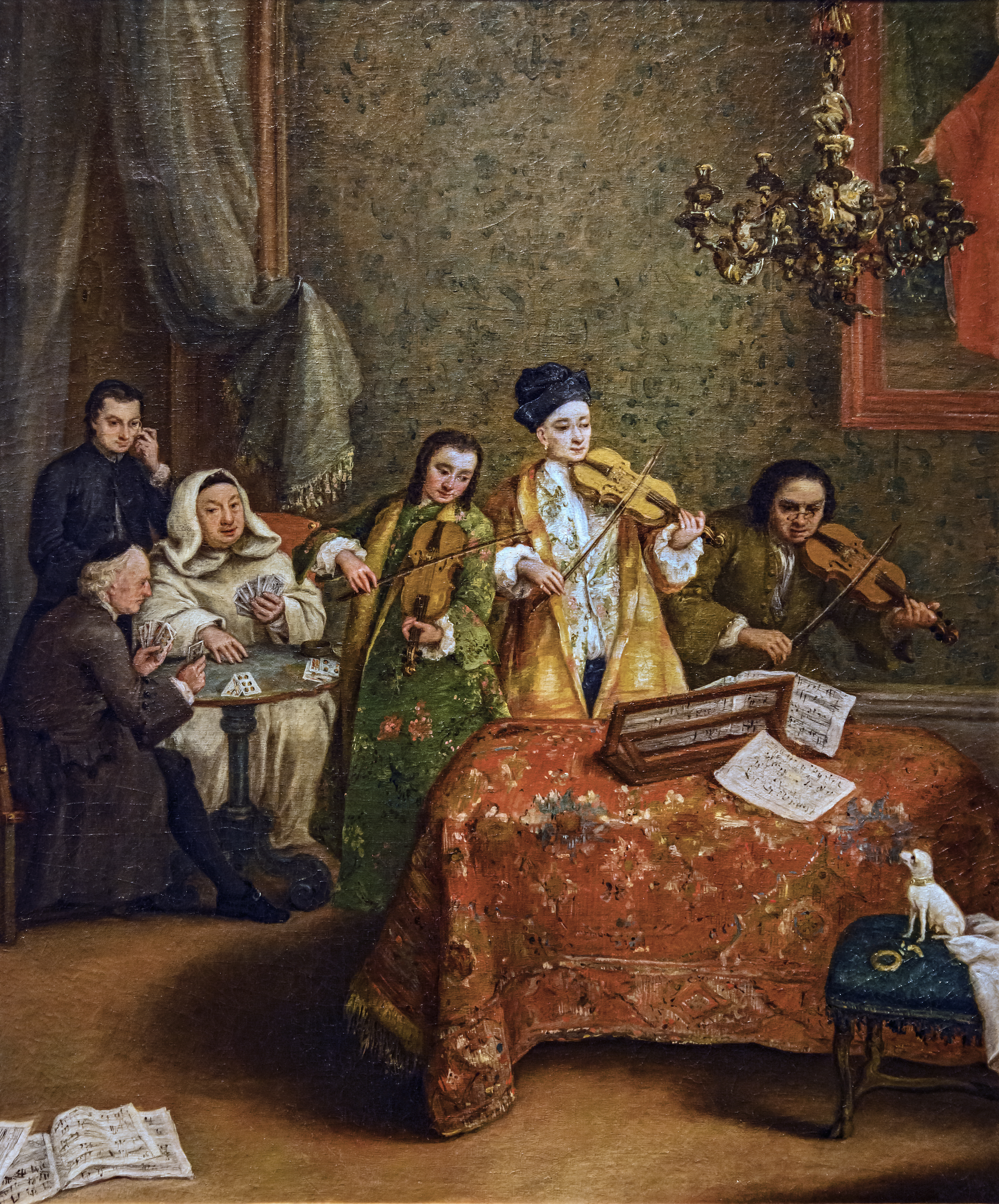
Il concertino (The concert) (1741)

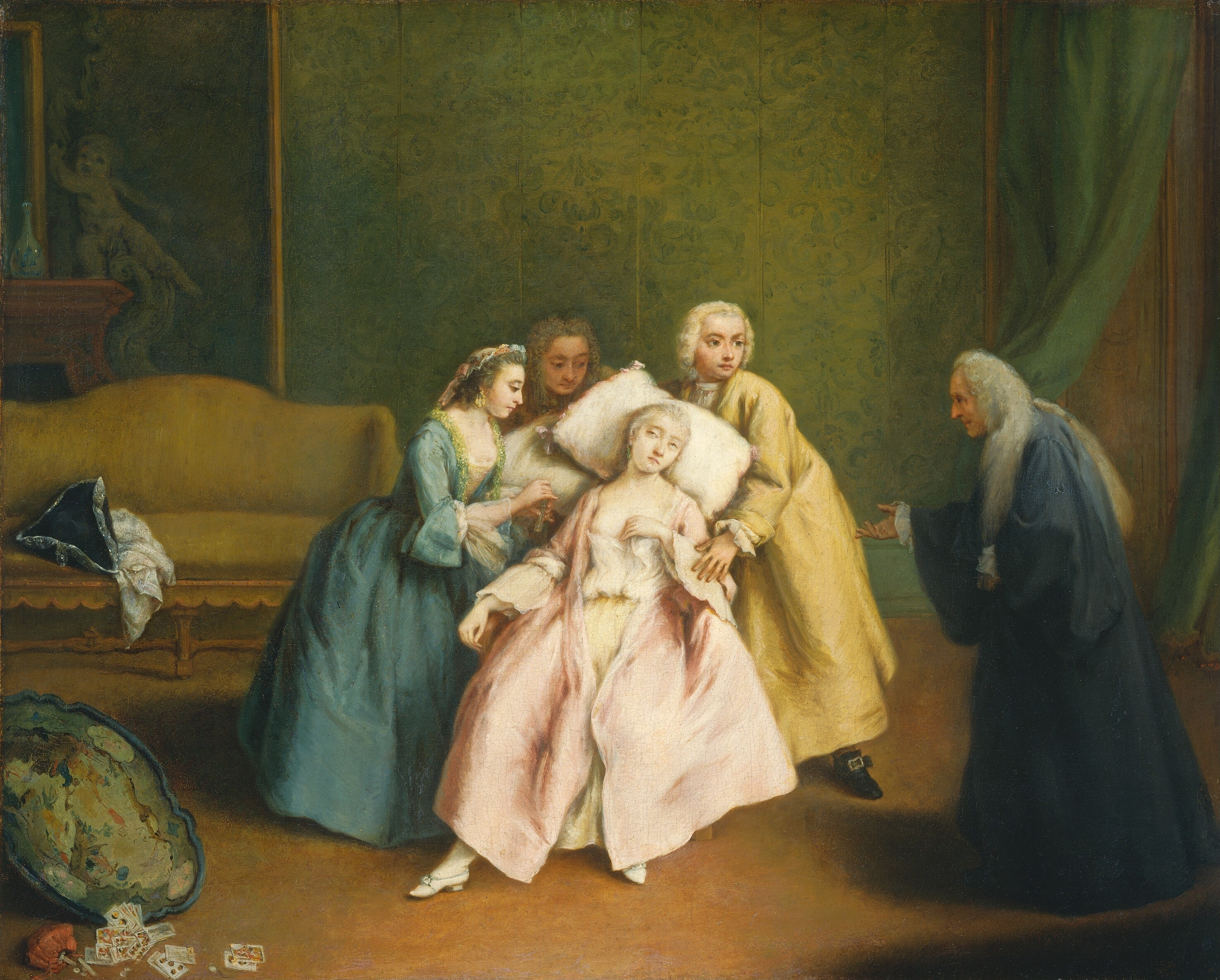
The Faint (c. 1744)

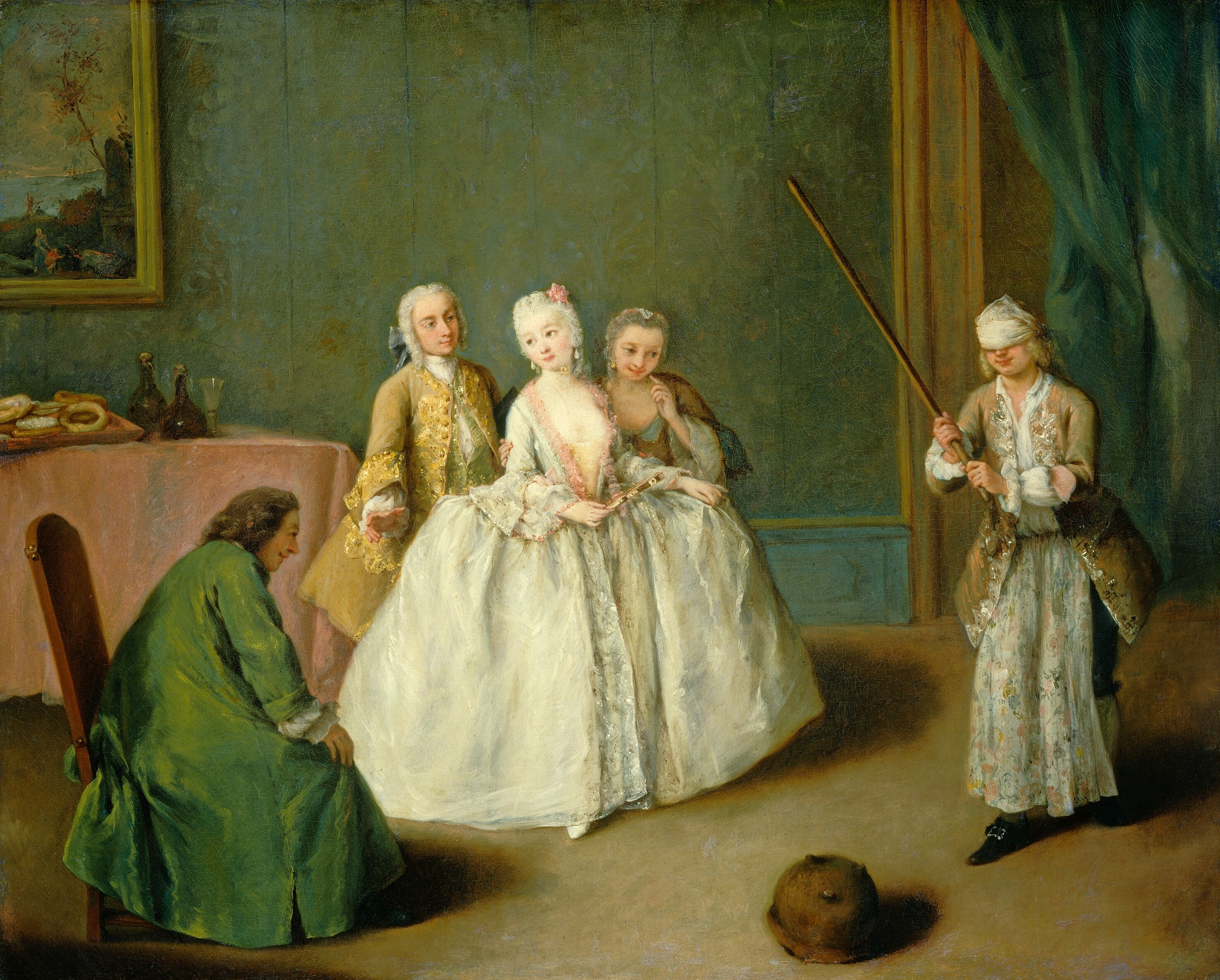
The Game of the Cooking Pot (c. 1744)

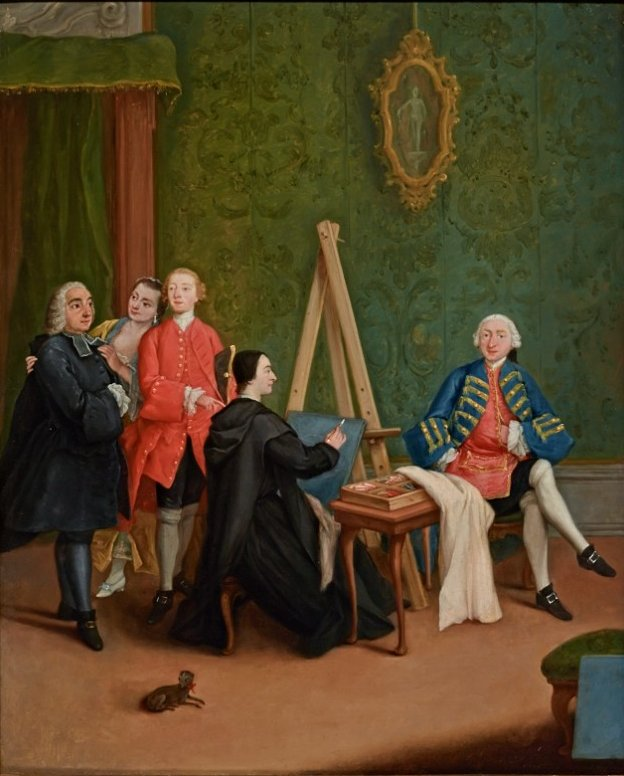
The Painter (between 1750 and 1759)

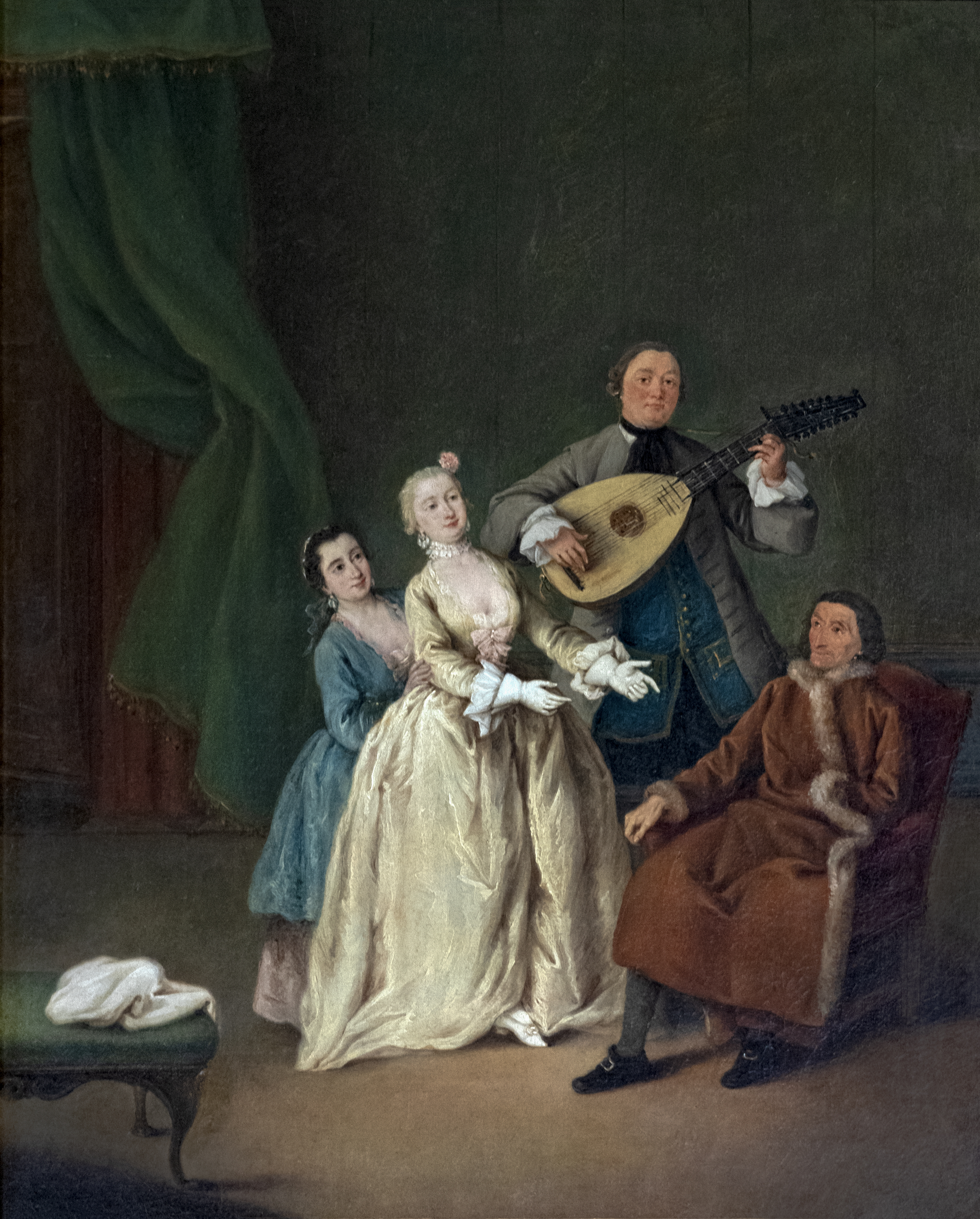
Il concertino in famiglia (The family concert) (1752)

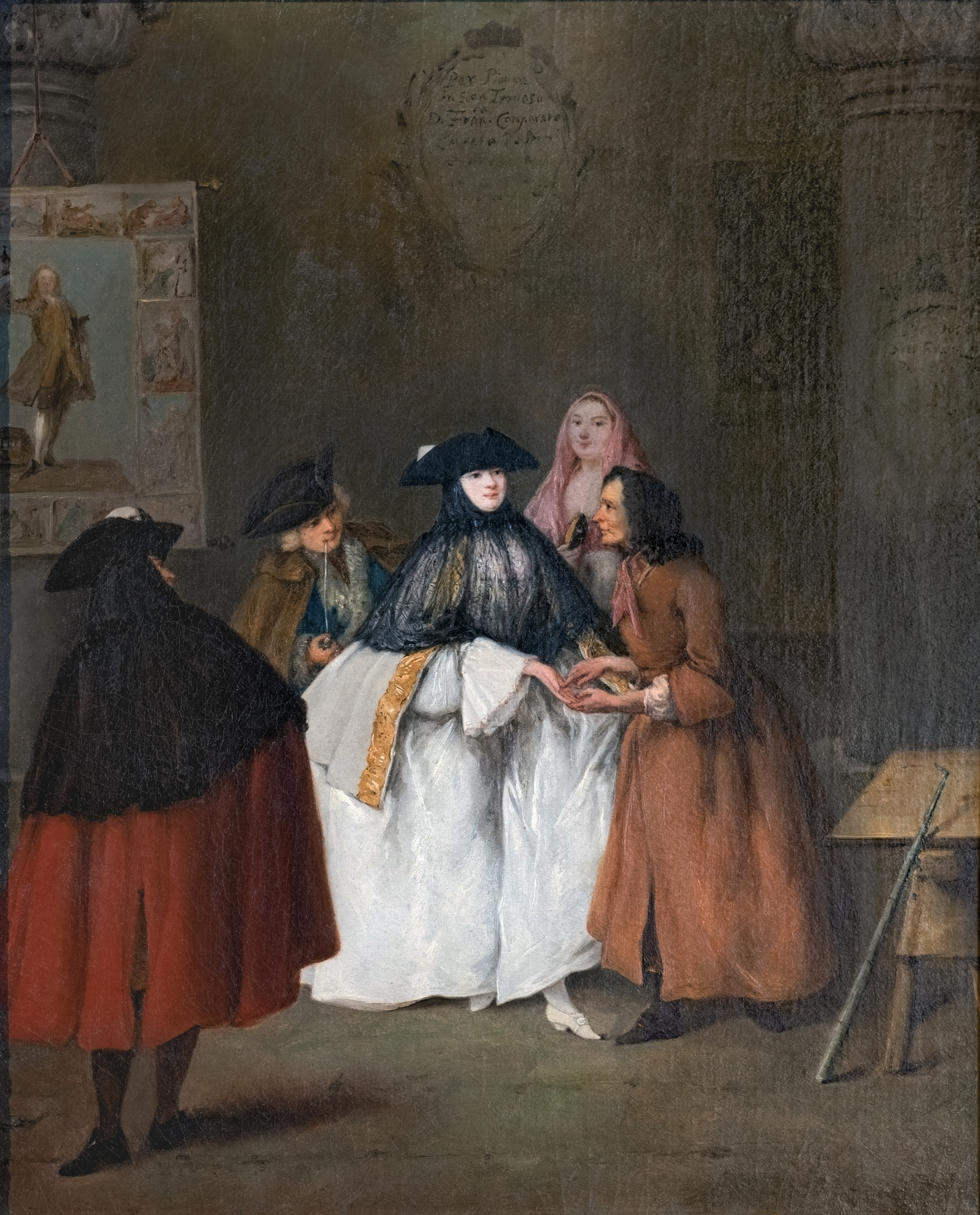
L'indovina Devineresse (The fortune teller) (1752)

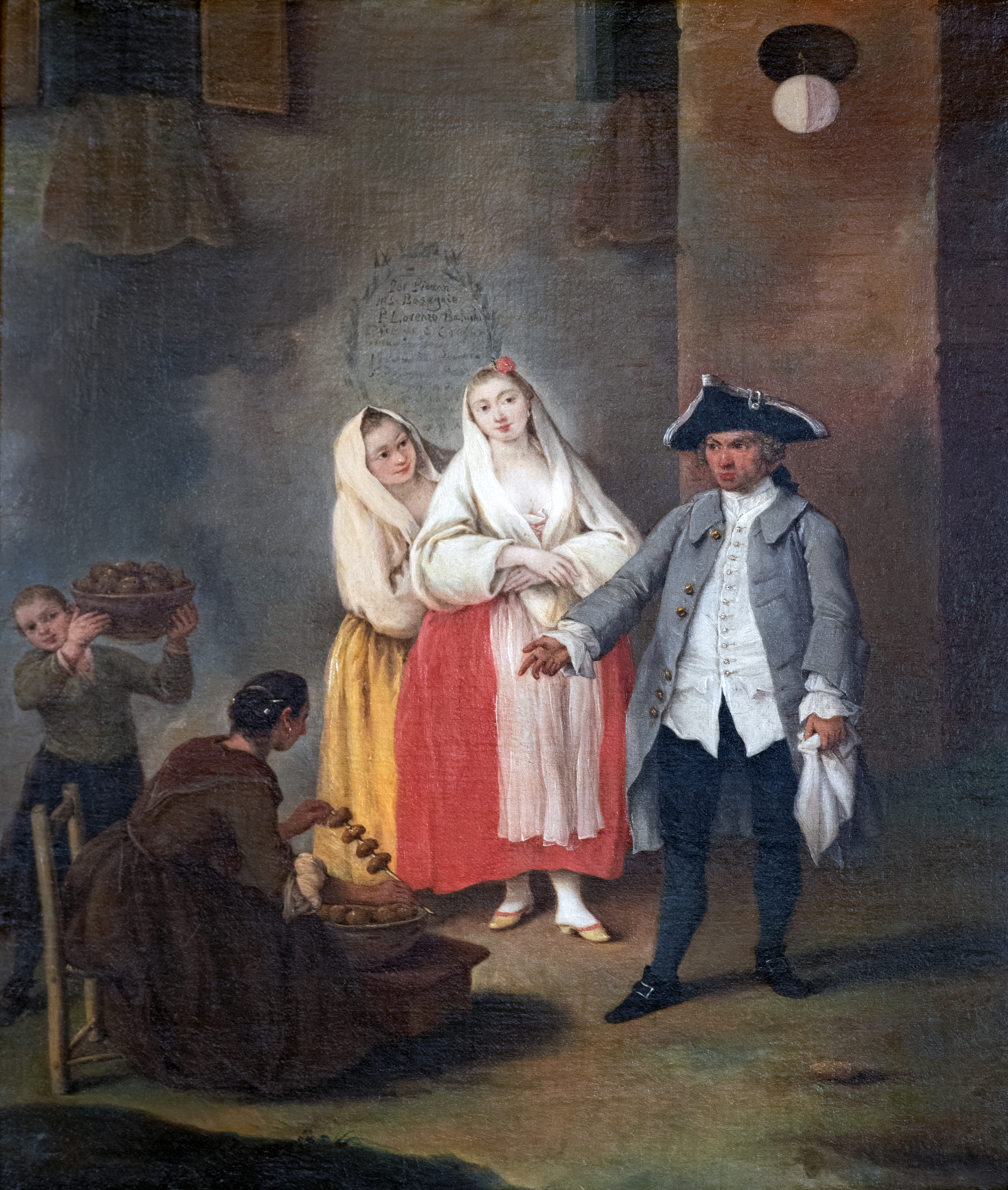
La venditrice di frittole (The frittole seller) (1755)

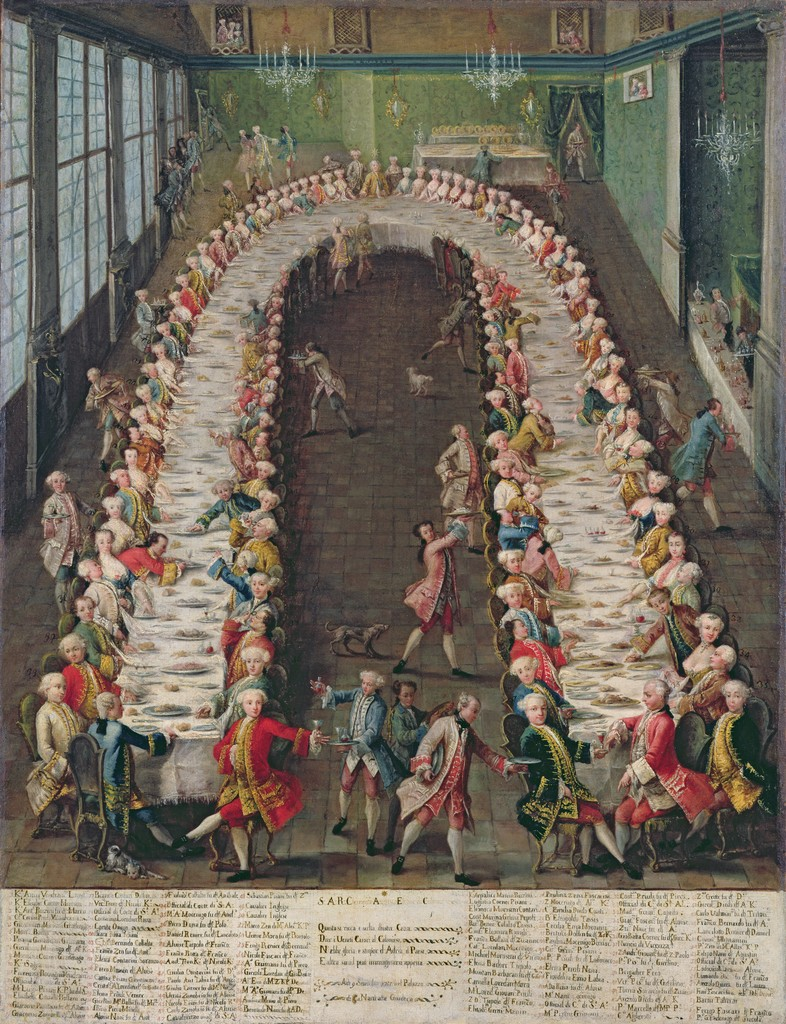
Banquet at the Casa Nani alla Giudecca in Venice in honour of the Elector-Archbishop of Cologne Clemens-August of Wittelsbach on September 9, 1755

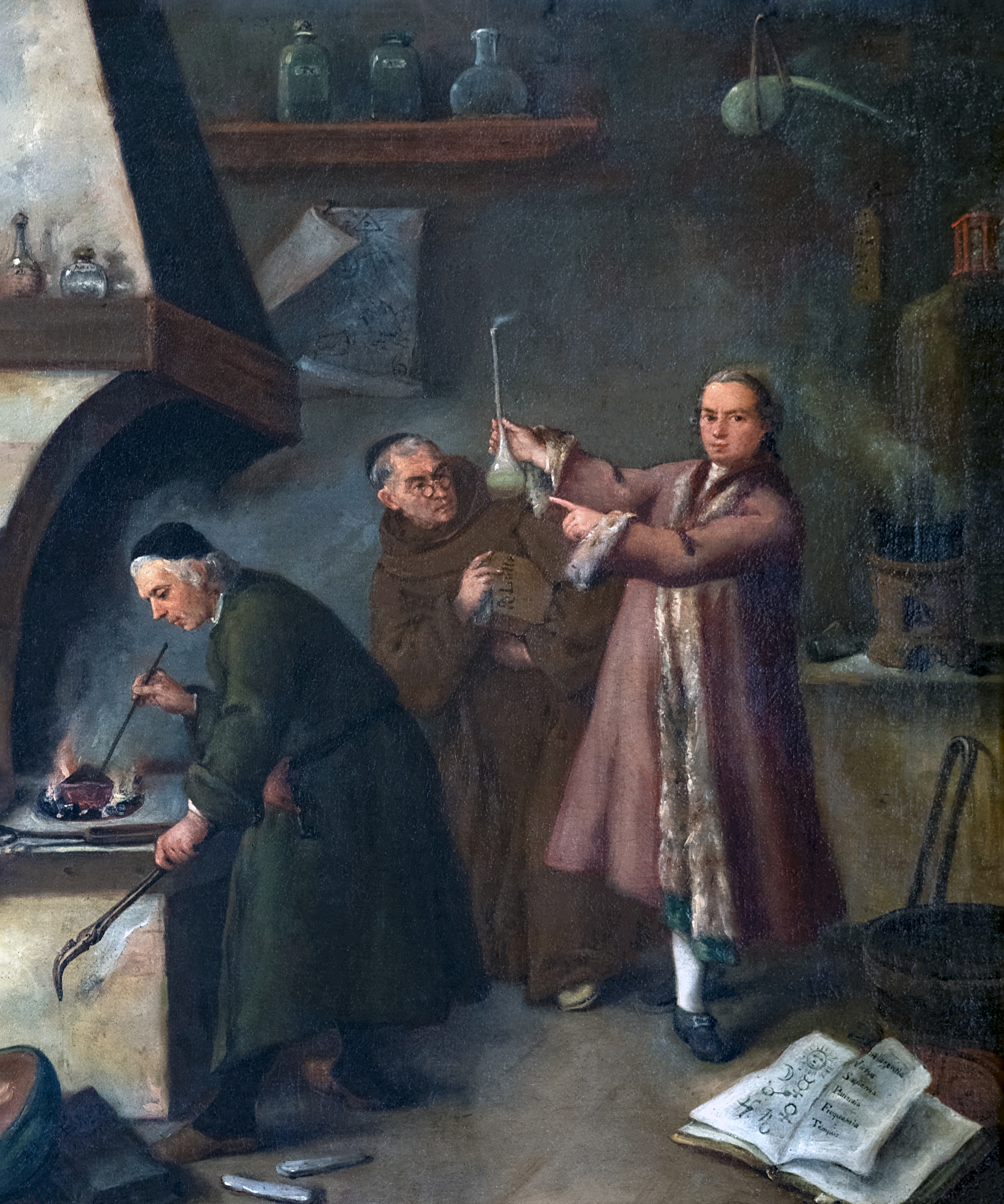
The Alchemists (1757)

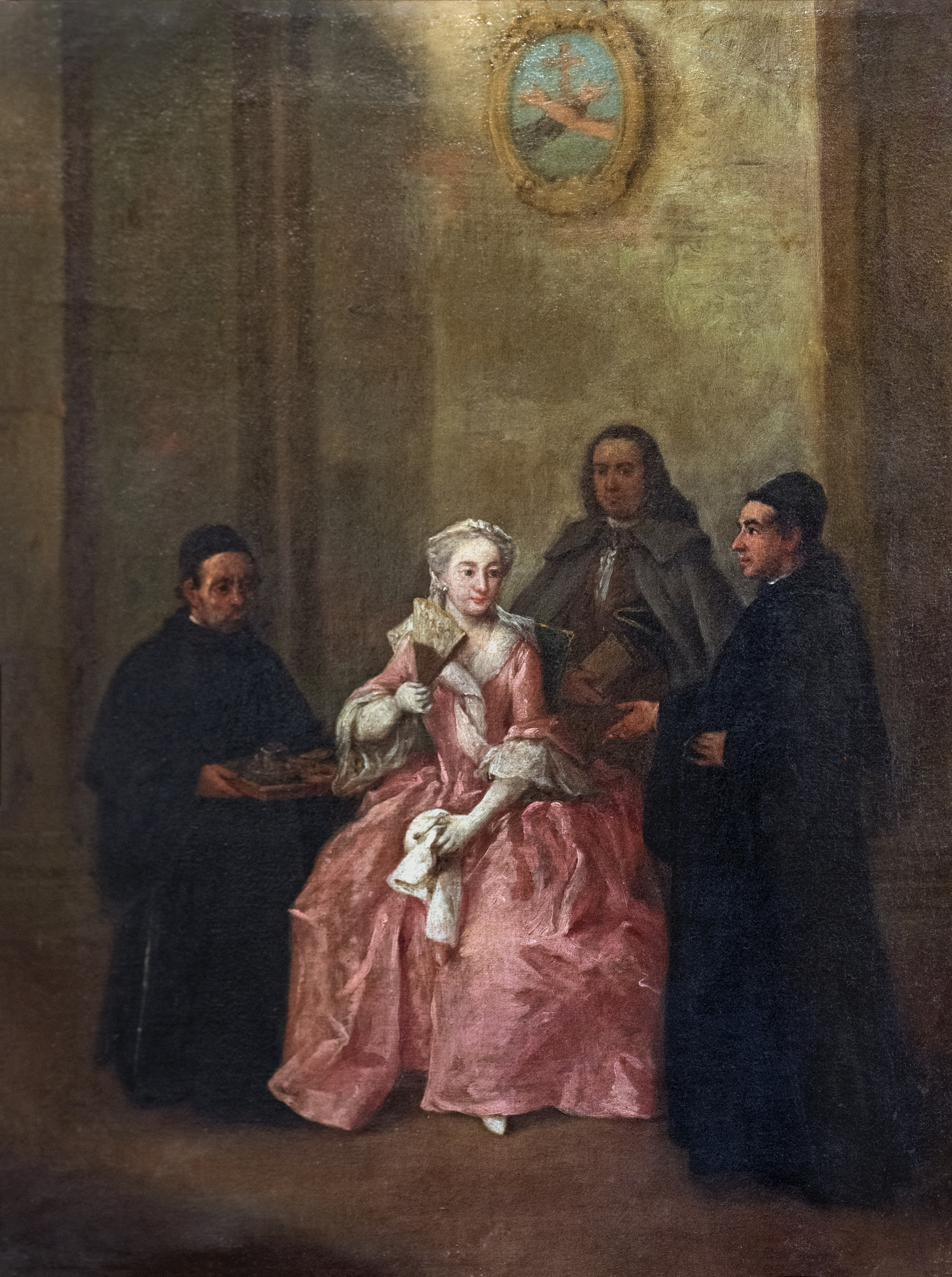
The visit to the convent (1760)

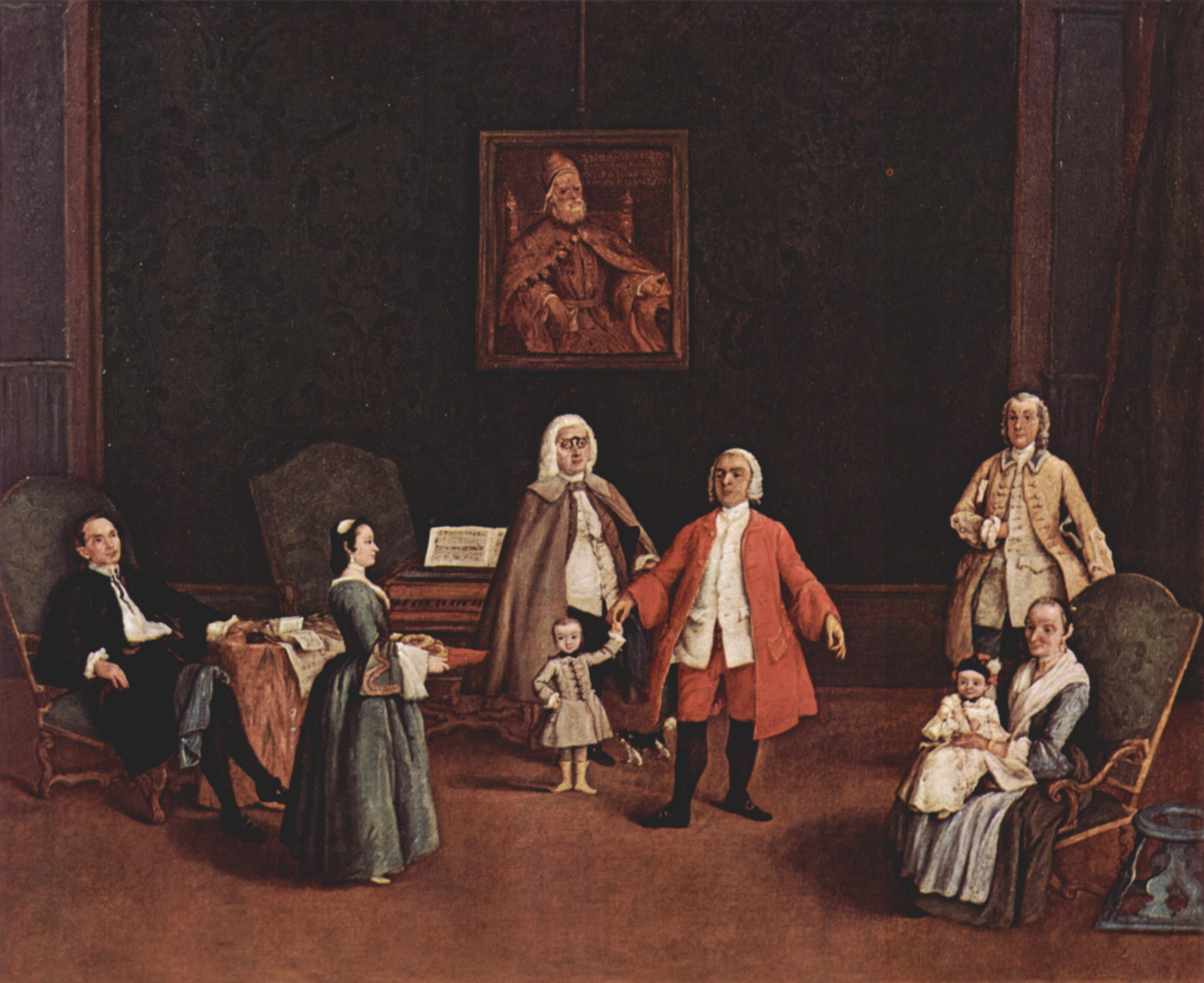
Portrait of a Venetian Family (1760–1765)

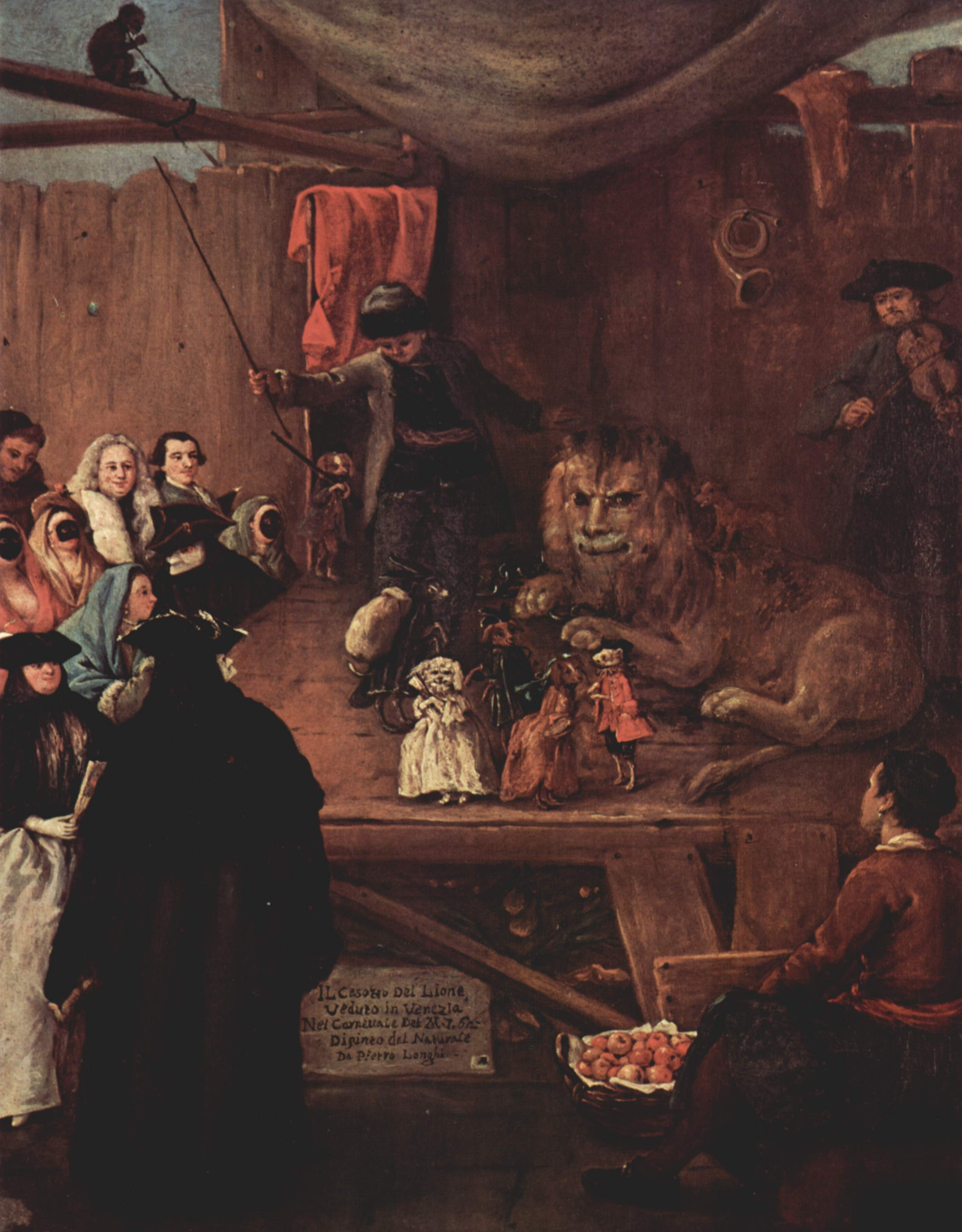
Il casotto del leone (1762)

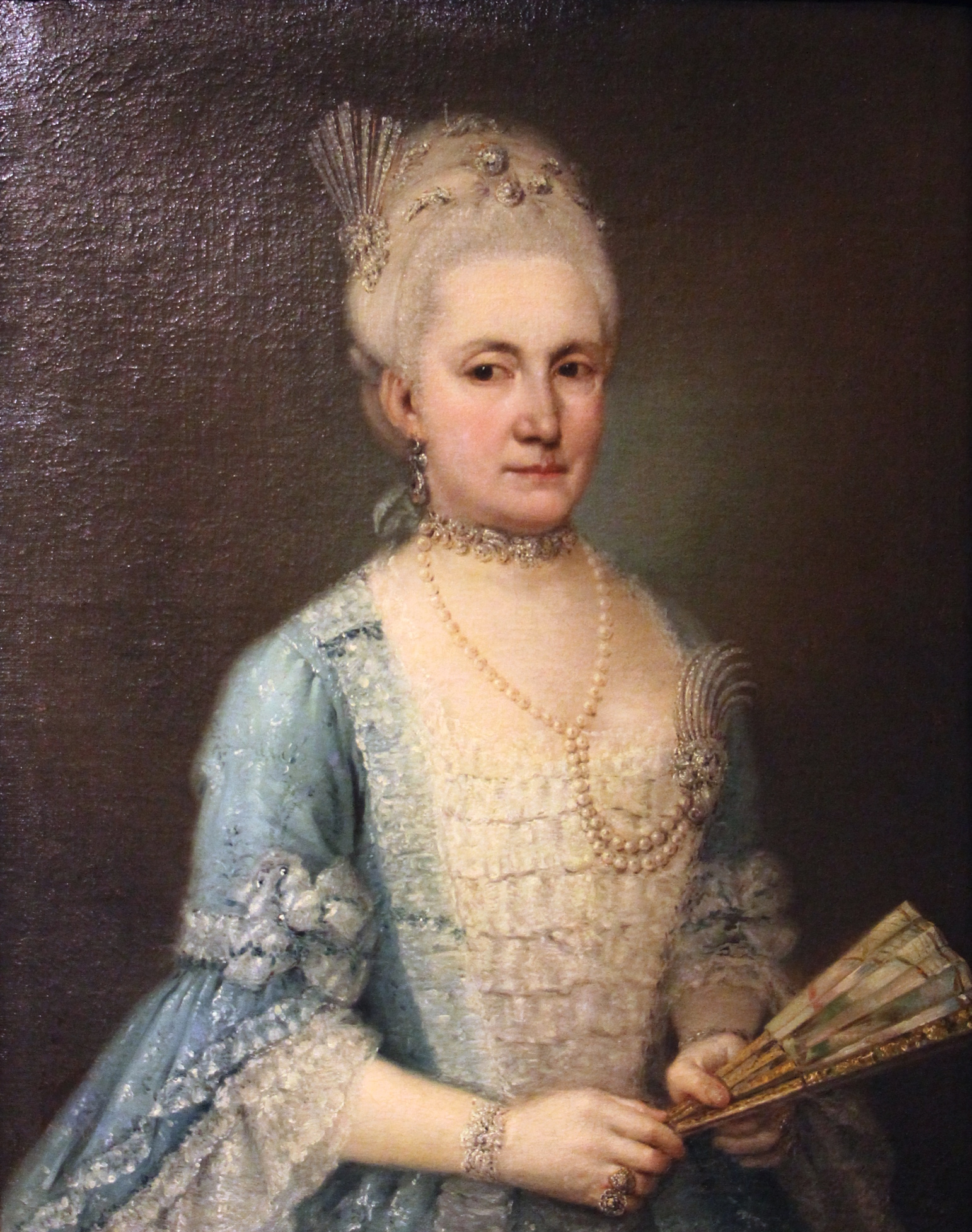
Portrait of Matilde Querini da Ponte (1772)

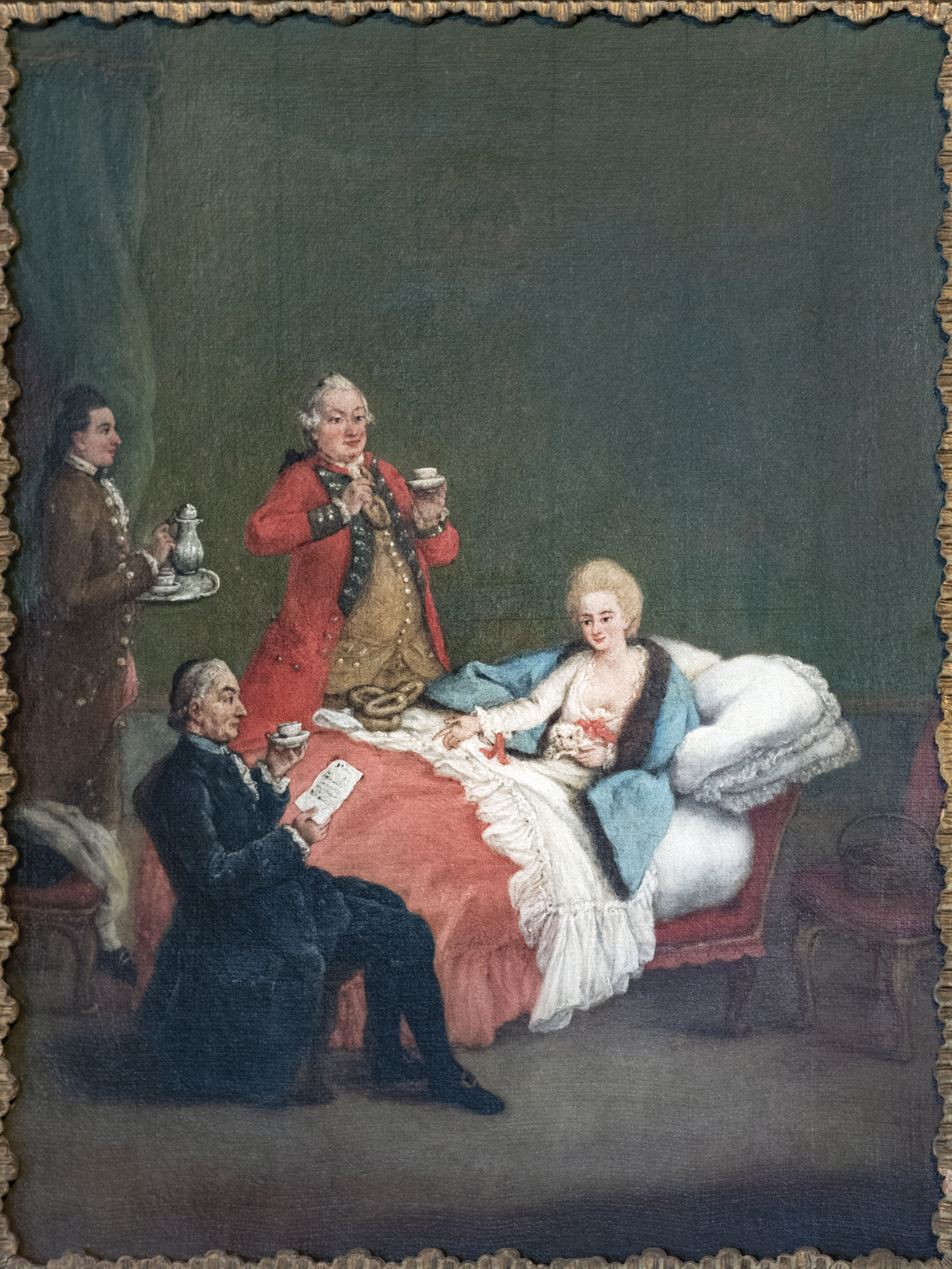
La cioccolata del mattino (The Morning Chocolate) (from 1775 until 1780)

== Works ==
- San Pellegrino sentenced to execution, 1730–1732, oil on canvas, 400x340, parish church of San Pellegrino
- Adoration of the Magi, 1730–1732, oil on canvas, 190x150, Scuola di San Giovanni Evangelista, Venice
- Fall of the giants (1734) frescoes, Ca' Sagredo, Venice
- Shepherd sitting, (1740) oil on canvas, 61x48, Museo Civico, Bassano
- Pastorello standing, (1740) oil on canvas, 61x48, Museo Civico, Bassano
- Shepherdess with flower, (1740) oil on canvas, 61x48, Museo Civico, Bassano
- Shepherdess with cock, (1740) oil on canvas, 61x48, Museo Civico, Bassano
- Pastorello standing, (1740) oil on canvas, 61x45, Museo del Seminario, Rovigo
- The spinner, (1740) oil on canvas, 61x50, Ca' Rezzonico, Venice
- The Washerwomen, (1740) oil on panel, 61x50, Ca' Rezzonico, Venice
- The happy couple, (1740) oil on canvas, 61x50, Ca' Rezzonico, Venice
- The polenta, (1740) oil on canvas, 61x50, Ca' Rezzonico, Venice
- Drinkers, 1740–1745, oil on canvas, 61x48, Milan, Galleria d'Arte Moderna
- The concert, (1741) oil on canvas, 60x48, Accademia, Venice
- The dance class, (c. 1741) oil on canvas, 60x49, Accademia, Venice
- The tailor, (c. 1741) oil on canvas, 60x49, Accademia, Venice
- The toilet, (c. 1741) oil on canvas, 60x49, Accademia, Venice
- The presentation, (c. 1741) oil on canvas, 64x53, Louvre, Paris
- The visit to the library, (c. 1741) oil on canvas, 59x44, Worcester Art Museum, Massachusetts
- Frescoes, (1744) Venice, Church of San Pantalon, Venice
- The awakening of the knight, (1744) oil on canvas, 49x60, Windsor, royal collections
- The blindman's buff, (1744) oil on canvas, 48x58, Windsor, royal collections
- Fainting, (1744) oil on canvas, 49x61, National Gallery, Washington DC
- The game of the pan, (1744) oil on canvas, 49x61, National Gallery, Washington DC
- The visit to the lady, (1746) oil on canvas, 61x49, Metropolitan Museum, New York
- Meeting of the Prosecutor and his wife, 1746, oil on canvas, 61x49, Metropolitan Museum, New York
- The visit to the Lord, (1746) oil on canvas, 61x49, Metropolitan Museum, New York
- The milliner, (1746) oil on canvas, 61x49, New York, Metropolitan Museum
- Family group, (1746) oil on canvas, 61x49, National Gallery, London
- The visit of the Prosecutor, c.1750, oil on canvas, 61x49, National Gallery, London
- The Dentist, c.1750, oil on canvas, 50x62, Brera, Milan
- The laundresses, c. 1750, oil on canvas, 61x50, Castle Zoppola, Pordenone
- The polenta, c.1750, oil on canvas, 60x50, Castle Zoppola, Pordenone
- The spinner, c.1750, oil on canvas, 61x50, Castle Zoppola, Pordenone
- Drunks, c.1750, oil on canvas, 61x50, Castello Zoppola, Pordenone
- The spinner, c.1750, oil on canvas, 60x49, Pinacoteca Querini Stampalia, Venice
- The peasant woman asleep, c.1750, oil on canvas, 61x50, Pinacoteca Querini Stampalia, Venice
- The seller of fritole, c.1750, oil on canvas, 62x51, Ca' Rezzonico, Venice
- The rhino, (1751) oil on canvas, 62x50, Ca' Rezzonico, Venice
- The rhino, c. 1751, oil on canvas, 60x57, National Gallery, London
- The soothsayer, (1752) oil on canvas, 62x50, Ca' Rezzonico, Venice
- The school work, (1752) oil on canvas, 62x50, Ca' Rezzonico, Venice
- Geography lesson, (1752) oil on canvas, 61x49, Venice, Fondazione Querini Stampalia.
- The pharmacist, (1752) oil on canvas, 60x48, Accademia, Venice
- The tickle, (1755) oil on canvas, 61x48, Thyssen-Bornemisza Museum, Madrid
- Baptism, (1755) oil on canvas, 60x49, Pinacoteca Querini Stampalia, Venice
- The charlatan, (1757) oil on canvas, 62x50, Ca' Rezzonico, Venice
- Alchemists, (1757) oil on canvas, 61x50, Ca' Rezzonico, Venice
- The Card Players, 1760, oil on canvas, 60x47, Milan, Galleria d'Arte Moderna
- The Music Lesson, 1760, oil on copper, 45x58, Walters Art Museum, Baltimore
- Philosopher Pythagoras, 1762, oil on canvas, 130x91, Accademia, Venice
- The cabin of the lion, 1762, oil on canvas, 61x50, Pinacoteca Querini Stampalia, Venice
- Francesco Guardi, 1764, oil on canvas, 132x100, Ca' Rezzonico, Venice
- The arrival of the Lord, c.1770, oil on canvas, 62x50, Pinacoteca Querini Stampalia, Venice
- The family Michiel, (1780) oil on canvas, 49x61, Pinacoteca Querini Stampalia, Venice
- Other works are in Art Institute of Chicago; Ashmolean Museum, Oxford; Norton Simon Museum, Passadena (California); and Rijksmuseum Amsterdam;

== Sources ==
- Martineau, Jane, and Andrew Robison (1994). The glory of Venice: art in the 18th century. London: Yale University Press. ISBN 0-300-06186-2
- Spike, John T (1986). Centro Di (ed.). Giuseppe Maria Crespi and the Emergence of Genre Painting in Italy.
- Pignatti, Terisio (1969). Pietro Longhi: Paintings and Drawings. London: Phaidon Press Ltd.
