= Antonio Panciera =

Italian Cardinal and humanist (1350–1431)

Antonio Panciera (1350–1431) was an Italian Cardinal and humanist.

== Biography ==
Born at Portogruaro, he studied law at the University of Padua, and worked in the papal administration. From 1393 he was bishop of Concordia, and in 1402 Patriarch of Aquileia. The following year he was able to obtain the palatine title of the castle of Zoppola. This caused a crisis with the other Friulian nobles, after which Panciera followed a pro-Venetian policy, leading the people of Cividale del Friuli to ask his removal to Pope Gregory XII. On 13 June 1408 he was therefore replaced as patriarch by Antonio di Ponte, but, with the support of some cardinals who opposed Gregory, he obtained his reinstatement at the Council of Basel.

In 1411 he was elected cardinal by John XXIII in order to free the Aquileian throne to Louis of Teck, a nobleman whose German allegiances were useful for the antipope. Pancieri remained in Friuli, but in 1412 he was forced to flee. In 1414 he took part in the Council of Constance, being among the accusators of Gregory XII. In 1417 he participated in the election of Pope Martin V, who made him administrator of Satriano and then of Frascati (1420). Later Panciera became abbot of Concordia, but never moved there.

He died in 1431 and was buried in the Vatican grottoes under St. Peter's Basilica.

== Notes ==
Preceded by Agostino di Boemia	Bishop of Concordia; 1392–1402	Succeeded by Antonio da Ponte (bishop)
Preceded by Antonio Caetani (seniore)	Patriarch of Aquileia; 1402–1412	Succeeded by Louis of Teck
Preceded by Pierre de Thury	Cardinal-Priest of Santa Susanna; 1411–1431	Succeeded by Tommaso Parentucelli
Preceded by Tommasso	Administrator of Satriano; 1419–1420	Succeeded by Andrea Raguseo
Preceded by Baldassare Cossa	Administrator of Frascati; 1420–1431	Succeeded by Hugues Lancelot de Lusignan
Preceded by Angelo Scardoni	Administrator of Equilio; 1424–1425	Succeeded by Guglielmo de Portugruario
Preceded by Baldassare Cossa	Cardinal-Bishop of Frascati; 1431	Succeeded by Hugues Lancelot de Lusignan
