= Giorgio Giaretta =

Italian footballer

Personal information
- Date of birth: 6 September 1912
- Place of birth: Cittadella, Italy
- Position: Midfielder

Senior career*
Years	Team	Apps	(Gls)
1935–1938	Padova	62	(15)
1938–1939	Juventus	6	(0)
1939–1940	Padova	23	(3)
- * Club domestic league appearances and goals

Giorgio Giaretta (born 6 September 1912) was an Italian professional footballer who played as a midfielder.
