= Pomponio Amalteo =

Italian painter

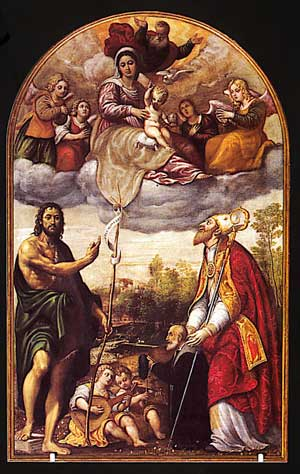
Pomponio Amalteo, Virgin in Glory with San Juan Bautista, San Tiziano and donor, 1563

Pomponio Amalteo (1505 – 9 March 1588) was an Italian painter of the Venetian school.

== Biography ==
Pomponio Amalteo was born at Motta di Livenza in Veneto in 1505. He was a pupil and son-in-law of Il Pordenone, whose style he closely imitated; he inherited Pordenone's studio in Friuli, where he led a long career. As Pordenone became increasingly active in Venice in the 1530s, Pomponio Amalteo was allowed to emerge as an independent master. He also became an inheritor of part of his Friulian approach, kind of an arrangement, cemented by his marriage to Pordenone’s daughter in 1534. His works consist chiefly of frescoes and altarpieces and many of which (for instance those in the church of Santa Maria de' Battisti and the altarpiece of Saint Sebastian (1533) at the duomo of San Vito al Tagliamento) have degraded greatly over time. Five pictures representing subjects of Roman history painted by Amalteo adorn the Hall of the Notaries at Belluno. He also frescoed a series of judges for a loggia in the court of justice in Ceneda.

His shading is weaker; colors, brighter; and proportions of figures, less elegant, than those of Pordenone, of which he was likely the most accomplished of his pupils.

His brother Girolamo Amalteo is supposed to have assisted him in his labors. His daughter Quintilia Amalteo had the reputation of an excellent portraitist; she married the painter Giuseppe Moretto. Girolamo, besides the works in which he aided his brother, executed small pictures, painted in fresco, and produced an altarpiece for the church of San Vito. Other pupils were Sebastiano Seccante (1534-1581) and Giovanni Antonio Agostini.

Members of the Amalteo family from Oderzo were writers. He died at San Vito al Tagliamento in 1588.

== Sources ==
- Freedberg, Sydney J. (1993). Pelican History of Art (ed.). Painting in Italy, 1500-1600. Penguin Books Ltd. p. 357.

Attribution:
