= Miles Sandys =

Miles Sandys may refer to:

- Miles Sandys (died 1601), English courtier and politician
- Miles Sandys (died 1636), English politician, grandson of Miles Sandys (died 1601)
- Sir Miles Sandys, 1st Baronet (1563–1645), English politician, nephew of Miles Sandys (died 1601)
- Sir Miles Sandys, 2nd Baronet (died 1654), son of the 1st Baronet

Family tree of Edwin Sandys, Archbishop of York

William Sandys
Edwin Sandys (1519–1588); Archbishop of York	Miles Sandys MP (c. 1520–1601)
Baronet, 1611
Samuel Sandys MP (1560–1623)	Edwin Sandys MP (1561–1629)	also James, William, Margaret (Aucher), Thomas, Henry	Miles Sandys Bt MP (1563–1645)	Anne Sandys (1570–c. 1629) m. William Barne	George Sandys (1578–1644) poet	Edwin Sandys MP (c. 1564–1608) m. Elizabeth, dau. of William, 3rd Baron Sandys	William Sandys (1565–1641)
Edwin Sandys MP (1591–1623)	Henry Sandys MP (c. 1607–1640)	Edwin Sandys (d. 1642) killed in Civil War	Miles Sandys Bt (d. 1654)	Anne Barne (1587–1633) m(1) William Lovelace m(2) Jonathan Browne	Henry Sandys; 5th Baron Sandys (d. 1644) killed in Civil War m. Jane, dau. of William Sandys	Miles Sandys MP (c. 1601–1636)	William Sandys MP (c. 1607–1669) "Waterworks"
Samuel Sandys MP (1615–1685)	Richard Sandys (d. 1669)	Richard Lovelace (1617–1657) poet	Francis Lovelace (c. 1621–1675); Govr. of New York	William, 6th Baron; Henry, 7th Baron; Edwin, 8th Baron
Baronet, 1684
Samuel Sandys MP (c. 1637–1701)	Richard Sandys Bt (1670–1726)	James Madison; U.S. President
Edwin Sandys MP (1659–1699)
Baron Sandys, 1743
Samuel Sandys; 1st Baron Sandys (1695–1770); Chancellor of the Exchequer
Edwin Sandys; 2nd Baron Sandys (1726–1797)	Martin Sandys (1729–1768)
Baron Sandys, 1802
Mary Sandys; 1st Baroness Sandys (1764–1836) m. Arthur Hill, 2nd Marquess of Downshire
Marquesses of Downshire; Barons Sandys

Disambiguation pages: Edwin Sandys · Henry Sandys · Miles Sandys · Samuel Sandys
See also: Marquesses of Downshire family tree

== See also ==
- Sandys (surname)
