= William Sandys (waterworks engineer) =

English politician (1600s–1669)

William Sandys (c. 1607 – December 1669), known as Waterworks Sandys, was an English politician. He was MP for Evesham in three Parliaments from 1640 until 1669. During the English Civil War he lived as an exile in France, procuring arms for the Royalist cause. He was a notable waterworks engineer, who improved the River Avon and the River Wye, and who was involved in various ways in several other river navigation schemes.

== Sandys family ==
William Sandys was born at Fladbury, Worcestershire, the second son of Sir William Sandys (later also of Miserden, Gloucestershire) and his second wife Margaret, daughter of Walter Culpeper. Sandys was the younger brother of Sir Miles Sandys MP, the grandson of Miles Sandys MP, and the great-nephew of Edwin Sandys, Archbishop of York.

Sandys is sometimes confused with two of his cousins, William Sandys nicknamed Golden Sandys (son of Sandys' uncle Sir Edwin Sandys MP) and William Sandys of Ombersley^{A} (son of Sir Samuel Sandys MP, son of Archbishop Sandys). All three were at the University of Oxford in the early 17th century. The nickname Waterworks Sandys distinguishes the subject of this article from Golden Sandys and Sandys of Ombersley.

Family tree of Edwin Sandys, Archbishop of York

Baron Sandys (1st creation) of the Vyne, 1523
William Sandys; 1470–1540; 1st Baron Sandys
Thomas Sandys d. 1560; 2nd Baron Sandys
William Sandys	Henry Sandys d. 1555	Walter Sandys c. 1540–1609
Edwin Sandys; 1519–1588; Archbishop of York	William Sandys d. 1623; 3rd Baron Sandys	Miles Sandys c. 1520–1601
Sandys Baronet of Wilberton, 1611
Samuel Sandys; 1560–1623	Edwin Sandys; 1561–1629	also James, William, Margaret (Aucher), Thomas, Henry	Miles Sandys; 1563–1645; 1st Baronet	Anne Sandys; 1570–c. 1629	George Sandys; 1578–1644	Elizabeth Sandys	Edwin Sandys c. 1564–1608	William Sandys; 1565–1641
Edwin Sandys; 1591–1623	Henry Sandys c. 1607–1640	Edwin Sandys d. 1642	Miles Sandys d. 1654; 2nd Baronet	Anne Barne; 1587–1633	Henry Sandys d. 1644; 5th Baron Sandys of the Vyne	Miles Sandys c. 1601–1636	William Sandys c. 1607–1669 "Waterworks"
Sandys Baronet of Wilberton extinct, 1654
Samuel Sandys; 1615–1685	Richard Sandys d. 1669	Richard Lovelace; 1617–1657	Francis Lovelace c. 1621–1675	William Sandys; 1626–1668; 6th Baron Sandys	Henry Sandys d. c. 1680; 7th Baron Sandys	Edwin Sandys d. 1683; 8th Baron Sandys
Barony Sandys (1st creation) of the Vyne abeyant, 1683
Sandys Baronet of Northborne, 1684
Samuel Sandys c. 1637–1701	Richard Sandys; 1670–1726; Baronet	James Madison; U.S. President
Sandys Baronet of Northborne extinct, 1726
Edwin Sandys; 1659–1699
Baron Sandys (2nd creation) of Ombersley, 1743
Samuel Sandys; 1695–1770; 1st Baron Sandys
Edwin Sandys; 1726–1797; 2nd Baron Sandys	Martin Sandys; 1729–1768
Baroness Sandys (3rd creation) of Ombersley, 1802
Mary Sandys; 1764–1836; 1st Baroness Sandys
Marquesses of Downshire; Barons Sandys

Disambiguation pages: Edwin Sandys · Henry Sandys · Miles Sandys · Samuel Sandys

- "Sandys (several articles used as source material)". History of Parliament.

== Biography ==
Sandys entered Gloucester Hall, Oxford in 1623, aged 16 – matriculating at Oxford on 13 June 1623, the same day as his cousin William Sandys of Ombersley. He entered the Middle Temple as a student in 1626.

He left London in 1633 to live at Fladbury with his new wife Cicely, daughter of Sir John Stede, with whom he received a handsome portion. They settled at Fladbury, where the lease of the manor (under the Bishop of Worcester) was settled on them.

In 1635, supported by petitions from many towns and from the counties affected, Sandys was authorised by Order in Council and Letters Patent, (in 1636),/ to improve the river Avon. Within a few years, he had made the river navigable at least to Stratford upon Avon, and possibly beyond. This was done by constructing 'sluices', which seem to have been pound locks (not flash locks − as often supposed). The navigation was complete to Stratford by 1640, but its cost had stretched his resources. He had had to mortgage his estates and the navigation, and these passed into the hands of his creditors.

Sandys also had a patent to farm a new duty imposed by the king (without the approval of Parliament) on coal exports. This project was a failure and he surrendered the grant, but the fact that he had taken it at all was later held against him. In 1640 he represented Evesham in the Short Parliament. He was re-elected for the same constituency in the Long Parliament, but was expelled as a monopolist. Not long after he went into exile.

During the English Civil War he acted as a Royalist agent purchasing munitions at Dunkirk. Later he travelled trying to raise money to finance the restoration of Charles as king. He was a supernumerary gentleman-usher at the exiled court, but was discouraged from attendance.

After the Restoration, Sandys represented Evesham in Cavalier Parliament and was a particularly active member for the rest of his life. His interests included the promotion of navigation schemes. He attempted to recover the river Avon, but his claim was probably bought out. He and Windsor Sandys (probably his son rather than his great nephew) improved the River Wye up to Mordiford (the confluence of the River Lugg), partly using finance raised for the purpose during the Interregnum, but this evidently did not pay its expenses and the river was eventually surrendered to the county. He and Windsor were also partners in the River Wey Navigation in Surrey, but the nature of their interest (eventually sold by Windsor Sandys) is not clear. In all, he was concerned in about seven schemes, but most did not pass the initial hurdle of an Act of Parliament being passed.

Due to his loss of his estates and his inability to profit from the Avon, Sandys had little property at his death in December 1669, apart from his navigation interests.

== Family ==
On 24 April 1633 Sandys married Cicely, daughter of Sir John Stede. After his death Cicely had difficulty in recovering the interest (as jointure in the manor of Fladbury, which she thought she had retained under arrangements made in the 1630s.

== Note ==
^A Alumni Oxonienses confuses the two, wrongly identifying William Sandys of Ombersley, not Waterworks Sandys, as MP for Evesham.

== Sources ==
- Rowlands, Edward (1983), "Sandys, William (c.1607-69), of Axe Yard, King Street, Westminster", in Henning, B.D. (ed.), The History of Parliament: the House of Commons 1660-1690 (online ed.), Boydell and Brewer
- Shill, Ray (2011), Silent Highways, Stroud: The History Press, p. 10, ISBN 978-07524-5842-7

Parliament of England
Vacant Parliament suspended since 1629	Member of Parliament for Evesham; 1640–1641; With: William Morton; Richard Cresheld	Succeeded by John Coventry; Richard Cresheld
Preceded by John Egioke; Sir Thomas Rouse, Bt	Member of Parliament for Evesham; 1661–1669; With: Sir Abraham Cullen, Bt; Sir John Hanmer, Bt	Succeeded by Sir James Rushout, Bt; Sir John Hanmer, Bt
