= Miles Sandys (died 1601) =

16th-century English politician

Miles Sandys (c. 1520 – 22 October 1601) was an English courtier and politician. He sat in each of the eight Parliaments from 1563 to 1597, yet never represented the same constituency twice.

Sandys was the brother of Edwin Sandys, Archbishop of York. Like his brother, he was educated at St John's College, Cambridge, matriculating in 1544. He was admitted to the Middle Temple in 1551, became a Bencher in 1578, and served as Treasurer 1588–95.

He was an influential crown official, working in the Court of Queen's Bench and becoming Clerk of the Crown. He sat as MP for Taunton (1563–1567), Lancaster (1571), Bridport (1572), Buckinghamshire (1584–85), Abingdon (1586–87), Plymouth (1588–89), Andover (1593) and Stockbridge (1597–98).

== Political Career ==
Sandys first appears in the parliamentary record in 1566, when he was appointed to the committee considering the Queen’s marriage and the succession. Thereafter he became a consistently active committeeman, though not a frequent speaker. In 1571 he spoke against the severity of the vagabonds bill, describing it as “over sharp and bloody” and proposing instead that provision be made to relieve the poor within their own parishes. During the 1572 Parliament he served on committees concerning Mary, Queen of Scots and Thomas Howard, 4th Duke of Norfolk, as well as a wide range of legal and administrative matters, and again intervened to argue that minstrels should be exempted from the vagabonds legislation. Throughout the 1570s and early 1580s he was repeatedly named to committees on subjects including religion, recusancy, subsidies, coinage, juries, unlawful weapons, counterfeit seals, the Scottish border, Dover harbour, the debts of Thomas Gresham and the Queen’s safety.

In the Parliament of 1584–85 Sandys, who stated that he had spent “the better part of 20 years in the study of the law”, played a prominent role in legal reform and questions of parliamentary privilege. He spoke on the depletion of timber by iron mills and on general demurrers, arguing that while good pleading was honourable, clients should not pay for excessive legal subtlety. He managed a bill on demurrers through the House and was active in several privilege disputes, including the case of Arthur Hall and proceedings relating to John Croke II. His committee work in this Parliament was extensive, covering the continuation of statutes, delays in justice, recusants’ armour, ecclesiastical appeals, penal laws, Jesuits, fraudulent conveyances, roads and bridges, the subsidy and other legislative business.

Sandys was less prominent in 1586–87, though he continued to serve on committees, including those relating to Mary, Queen of Scots, disputed elections, the subsidy and fraudulent conveyances; in 1588 he was among the lawyers consulted by the Privy Council on statutory reform. He resumed a more visible role in 1593, serving on the privileges and subsidy committees, speaking in the Fitzherbert privilege case, and urging stricter provisions in legislation against recusants, including Brownists, as well as involvement in poor law measures. In his final Parliament of 1597–98 no speeches are recorded, but he remained an active committeeman on matters ranging from penal laws and sturdy beggars to tillage, writs of error, charitable uses, defence and bail, sustaining his long-standing reputation for diligent service in legal and procedural affairs.

He died on 22 October 1601 in Latimer, Buckinghamshire.

== Family ==
Sandys was married firstly to Hester Clifton, daughter of William Clifton. They had four sons and three daughters:

- Sir Edwin Sandys MP (c. 1564–1608)
- Sir William Sandys (1565–1641)
- Hester Sandys (1569–1656), married Sir Thomas Temple, Bt
- George Sandys
- Henry Sandys
- Elizabeth Sandys, married Sir Edmund Conquest, High Sheriff of Bedfordshire 1618
- Bridget Sandys, married Sir Nicholas Hyde, Bt

Sandys was married secondly to Bridget Colt, widow of alderman Woodcock of London.

Family tree of Edwin Sandys, Archbishop of York

William Sandys
Edwin Sandys (1519–1588); Archbishop of York	Miles Sandys MP (c. 1520–1601)
Baronet, 1611
Samuel Sandys MP (1560–1623)	Edwin Sandys MP (1561–1629)	also James, William, Margaret (Aucher), Thomas, Henry	Miles Sandys Bt MP (1563–1645)	Anne Sandys (1570–c. 1629) m. William Barne	George Sandys (1578–1644) poet	Edwin Sandys MP (c. 1564–1608) m. Elizabeth, dau. of William, 3rd Baron Sandys	William Sandys (1565–1641)
Edwin Sandys MP (1591–1623)	Henry Sandys MP (c. 1607–1640)	Edwin Sandys (d. 1642) killed in Civil War	Miles Sandys Bt (d. 1654)	Anne Barne (1587–1633) m(1) William Lovelace m(2) Jonathan Browne	Henry Sandys; 5th Baron Sandys (d. 1644) killed in Civil War m. Jane, dau. of William Sandys	Miles Sandys MP (c. 1601–1636)	William Sandys MP (c. 1607–1669) "Waterworks"
Samuel Sandys MP (1615–1685)	Richard Sandys (d. 1669)	Richard Lovelace (1617–1657) poet	Francis Lovelace (c. 1621–1675); Govr. of New York	William, 6th Baron; Henry, 7th Baron; Edwin, 8th Baron
Baronet, 1684
Samuel Sandys MP (c. 1637–1701)	Richard Sandys Bt (1670–1726)	James Madison; U.S. President
Edwin Sandys MP (1659–1699)
Baron Sandys, 1743
Samuel Sandys; 1st Baron Sandys (1695–1770); Chancellor of the Exchequer
Edwin Sandys; 2nd Baron Sandys (1726–1797)	Martin Sandys (1729–1768)
Baron Sandys, 1802
Mary Sandys; 1st Baroness Sandys (1764–1836) m. Arthur Hill, 2nd Marquess of Downshire
Marquesses of Downshire; Barons Sandys

Disambiguation pages: Edwin Sandys · Henry Sandys · Miles Sandys · Samuel Sandys
See also: Marquesses of Downshire family tree

Parliament of England
Preceded by Valentine Dale; Richard Myrfield	Member of Parliament for Taunton; 1563–1567; With: Anthony Leigh	Succeeded by Robert Hill; Richard Blount
Preceded by John Hales; William Fleetwood	Member of Parliament for Lancaster; 1571–1572; With: Henry Sadler 1571–1588	Succeeded by Thomas Sadler; Henry Sadler
Preceded by John Hales; William Fleetwood	Member of Parliament for Bridport; 1572–1581; With: Lord Russell; Hugh Vaughan	Succeeded by Peter Turner; Morgan Moon
Preceded by Henry Lee; John Croke	Member of Parliament for Buckinghamshire; 1584–1585; With: Griffith Hampden	Succeeded by Francis Goodwin; John Borlase
Preceded by Edward Norreys	Member of Parliament for Abingdon; 1586–1587	Succeeded by Edward Norreys
Preceded by Henry Bromley; Hugh Vaughan	Member of Parliament for Plymouth; 1588–1593; With: Reginald Nicholas	Succeeded by Francis Drake; Robert Basset
Preceded by Thomas Temple; Henry Reade	Member of Parliament for Andover; 1593–1593; With: Edward Barker	Succeeded by Edward Reynolds; Edward Phelips
Preceded by John Awdeley; Henry St John	Member of Parliament for Stockbridge; 1597–1601; With: Mark Steward	Succeeded by Edward Savage; Thomas Grymes
