= Edwin Sandys (died 1608) =

English Member of Parliament

Sir Edwin Sandys (c. 1564 – 15 March 1608) was an English politician, MP for Andover 1586–1587.

He was the eldest son of Miles Sandys MP (brother of Edwin Sandys, Archbishop of York) and his first wife Hester Clifton.

Sandys and his brothers may be the "Sandes" who appear in the registers of Eton College, in which case Edwin Sandys attended 1574–1575. He entered the Middle Temple in 1579.

On 2 June 1586 he married Elizabeth Sandys, daughter of William, 3rd Baron Sandys of The Vyne. (Despite the name, the two families had different origins: the family of Archbishop Sandys originated in Cumbria, while the Barons Sandys had their seat at The Vyne, Hampshire.) They had three sons, of which the youngest, but the only one to leave children, was Colonel Henry Sandys, 5th Baron Sandys.

Sandys was elected MP for Andover in 1586, but sat in only one Parliament. In the following Parliament of 1589, Sandys was replaced by his brother-in-law Thomas Temple.

He was knighted in Ireland in 1599, and was High Sheriff of Bedfordshire from February to November 1606.

He died on 15 March 1608.

Family tree of Edwin Sandys, Archbishop of York

William Sandys
Edwin Sandys (1519–1588); Archbishop of York | Miles Sandys MP (c. 1520–1601)
Baronet, 1611
Samuel Sandys MP (1560–1623) | Edwin Sandys MP (1561–1629) | also James, William, Margaret (Aucher), Thomas, Henry | Miles Sandys Bt MP (1563–1645) | Anne Sandys (1570–c. 1629) m. William Barne | George Sandys (1578–1644) poet | Edwin Sandys MP (c. 1564–1608) m. Elizabeth, dau. of William, 3rd Baron Sandys | William Sandys (1565–1641)
Edwin Sandys MP (1591–1623) | Henry Sandys MP (c. 1607–1640) | Edwin Sandys (d. 1642) killed in Civil War | Miles Sandys Bt (d. 1654) | Anne Barne (1587–1633) m(1) William Lovelace m(2) Jonathan Browne | Henry Sandys; 5th Baron Sandys (d. 1644) killed in Civil War m. Jane, dau. of William Sandys | Miles Sandys MP (c. 1601–1636) | William Sandys MP (c. 1607–1669) "Waterworks"
Samuel Sandys MP (1615–1685) | Richard Sandys (d. 1669) | Richard Lovelace (1617–1657) poet | Francis Lovelace (c. 1621–1675); Govr. of New York | William, 6th Baron; Henry, 7th Baron; Edwin, 8th Baron
Baronet, 1684
Samuel Sandys MP (c. 1637–1701) | Richard Sandys Bt (1670–1726) | James Madison; U.S. President
Edwin Sandys MP (1659–1699)
Baron Sandys, 1743
Samuel Sandys; 1st Baron Sandys (1695–1770); Chancellor of the Exchequer
Edwin Sandys; 2nd Baron Sandys (1726–1797) | Martin Sandys (1729–1768)
Baron Sandys, 1802
Mary Sandys; 1st Baroness Sandys (1764–1836) m. Arthur Hill, 2nd Marquess of Downshire
Marquesses of Downshire; Barons Sandys

Disambiguation pages: Edwin Sandys · Henry Sandys · Miles Sandys · Samuel Sandys
See also: Marquesses of Downshire family tree

Parliament of England
| New constituency | Member of Parliament for Andover; 1586–1587; With: James Hawley | Succeeded by Henry Reade; Thomas Temple |
