= Miles Sandys (died 1636) =

English politician and author

Sir Miles Sandys (c. 1601 – 1636) was an English politician and author, MP for Cirencester in 1625.

Sandys was the son of Sir William Sandys (son of Miles Sandys MP, himself brother of Edwin Sandys, Archbishop of York), and his wife Margaret, daughter of Walter Culpeper. His younger brother was William Sandys MP, the waterways engineer known as "Waterworks Sandys".

He was educated at Hart Hall, Oxford, matriculating in 1616 aged 15, not taking a degree. He entered the Middle Temple as a student in 1618.

He was knighted on 8 June 1619.

On 4 November 1622 he married Mary Hanbury, daughter of Sir John Hanbury. They had one daughter and three sons:

- Mary Sandys
- William Sandys (died 1649)
- Edward Sandys
- Miles Sandys

Sandys was elected MP for Cirencester in the Useless Parliament of 1625. The Parliament was dissolved by King Charles I after sitting for less than three months; Sandys left no mark on the parliamentary records.

He was the author of the treatise Prudence, published in two editions in 1634, which accounts for prudence as comprising memory, understanding and providence.

Family tree of Edwin Sandys, Archbishop of York

William Sandys
Edwin Sandys (1519–1588); Archbishop of York	Miles Sandys MP (c. 1520–1601)
Baronet, 1611
Samuel Sandys MP (1560–1623)	Edwin Sandys MP (1561–1629)	also James, William, Margaret (Aucher), Thomas, Henry	Miles Sandys Bt MP (1563–1645)	Anne Sandys (1570–c. 1629) m. William Barne	George Sandys (1578–1644) poet	Edwin Sandys MP (c. 1564–1608) m. Elizabeth, dau. of William, 3rd Baron Sandys	William Sandys (1565–1641)
Edwin Sandys MP (1591–1623)	Henry Sandys MP (c. 1607–1640)	Edwin Sandys (d. 1642) killed in Civil War	Miles Sandys Bt (d. 1654)	Anne Barne (1587–1633) m(1) William Lovelace m(2) Jonathan Browne	Henry Sandys; 5th Baron Sandys (d. 1644) killed in Civil War m. Jane, dau. of William Sandys	Miles Sandys MP (c. 1601–1636)	William Sandys MP (c. 1607–1669) "Waterworks"
Samuel Sandys MP (1615–1685)	Richard Sandys (d. 1669)	Richard Lovelace (1617–1657) poet	Francis Lovelace (c. 1621–1675); Govr. of New York	William, 6th Baron; Henry, 7th Baron; Edwin, 8th Baron
Baronet, 1684
Samuel Sandys MP (c. 1637–1701)	Richard Sandys Bt (1670–1726)	James Madison; U.S. President
Edwin Sandys MP (1659–1699)
Baron Sandys, 1743
Samuel Sandys; 1st Baron Sandys (1695–1770); Chancellor of the Exchequer
Edwin Sandys; 2nd Baron Sandys (1726–1797)	Martin Sandys (1729–1768)
Baron Sandys, 1802
Mary Sandys; 1st Baroness Sandys (1764–1836) m. Arthur Hill, 2nd Marquess of Downshire
Marquesses of Downshire; Barons Sandys

Disambiguation pages: Edwin Sandys · Henry Sandys · Miles Sandys · Samuel Sandys
See also: Marquesses of Downshire family tree

Parliament of England
Preceded by Sir Thomas Roe; Sir William Master	Member of Parliament for Cirencester; 1625–1626; With: Henry Poole	Succeeded by Sir Neville Poole; John George
