= George Sandys =

English traveller, colonist, poet, translator

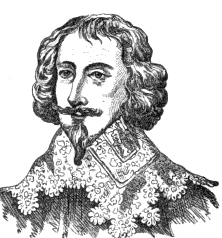
- Portrait of George Sandys
- Born: 2 March 1578; Bishopthorpe, Yorkshire, England
- Died: March 1644 (aged 65–66); Boxley, Kent, England
- Occupations: author, traveller, colonist, poet, translator
- Years active: 1610-1640
- Notable work: Translations of Ovid's Metamorphoses and the Passion of Jesus

George Sandys (/sændz/ "sands"; 2 March 1578 – March 1644) was an English traveller, colonist, poet, and translator. He was known for his translations of Ovid's Metamorphoses and the Passion of Jesus, as well as his travel narratives of the Eastern Mediterranean region, which formed a substantial contribution to geography and ethnology.

== Life ==
Coat of Arms of George Sandys

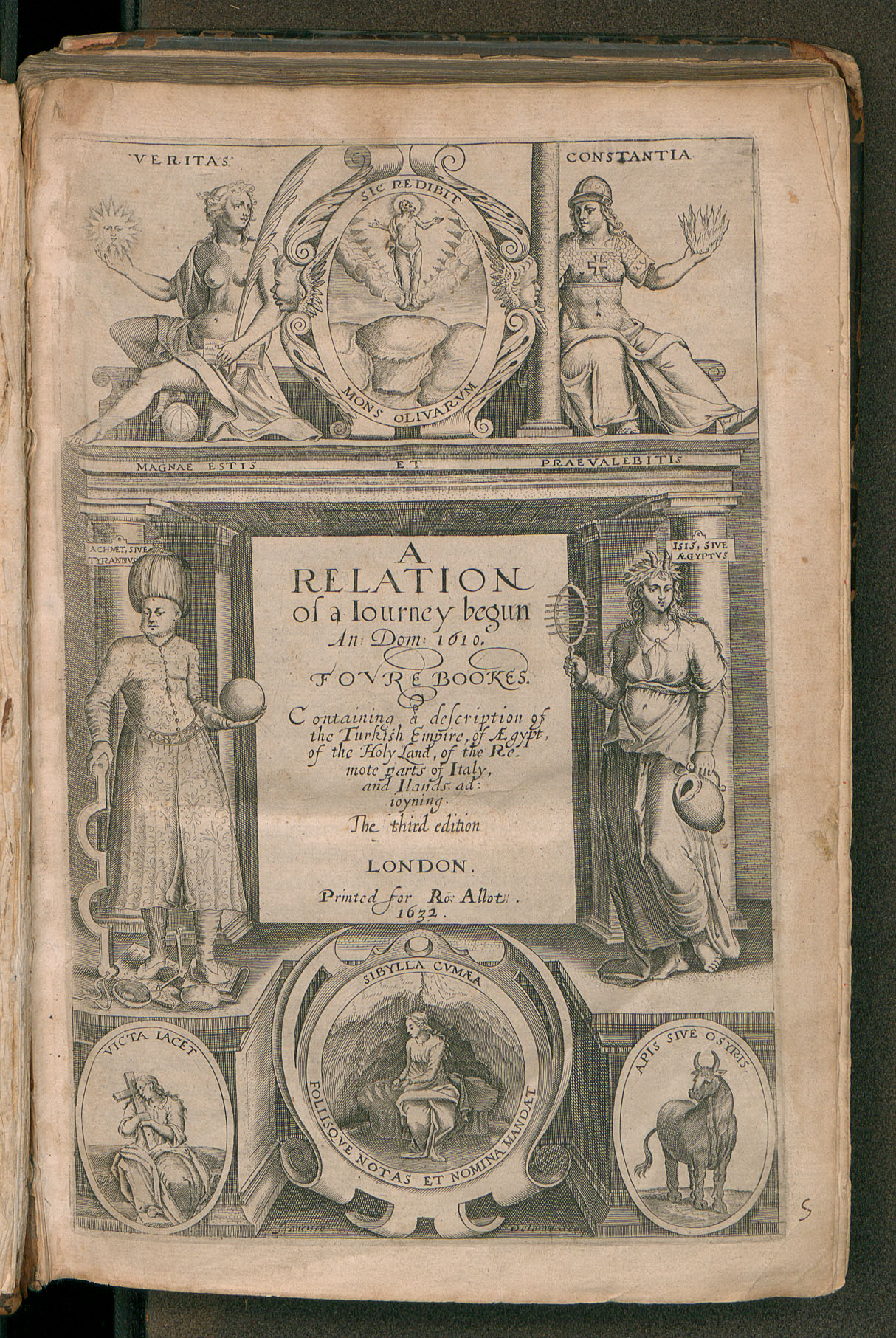
Relation of a journey begun Anno Domini 1610, 1632

He was born in Bishopthorpe, the seventh and youngest son of Edwin Sandys, archbishop of York. He studied at St Peter's School, York and St Mary Hall, Oxford in 1589, admitted to Middle Temple, 23 October 1596, and later transferred to Corpus Christi College, Oxford, but took no degree. In 1610, he began his travels through Europe and the Middle East, which culminated in his work The Relation of a Journey begun an. Dom. 1610, in four books.

Sandys also took great interest in the earliest English colonization in America. In April 1621 he became colonial treasurer of the Virginia Company and sailed to Virginia with his niece's husband, Sir Francis Wyatt, the new governor.

When Virginia became a crown colony, Sandys was created a member of council in August 1624; he was reappointed to this post in 1626 and 1628. In 1631, he unsuccessfully applied for the secretaryship to the new special commission for the better plantation of Virginia; soon after this, he returned to England for good.

In 1621, he had already published an English translation, written in basic heroic couplets, of part of Ovid's Metamorphoses; this he completed in 1626; his poetic reputation rested mainly on this in the 17th and 18th centuries. Its 1632 edition, featuring extensive commentaries written by Sandys, provided an allegorical reading of Ovid's text. He also began a version of Virgil's Aeneid, but never produced more than the first book. In 1636, he issued his famous Paraphrase upon the Psalms and Hymns dispersed throughout the Old and New Testaments, he translated Christ's Passion from the Latin of Grotius, and, in 1641, he brought out his last work, a Paraphrase of the Song of Songs. He died, unmarried, at Boxley, near Maidstone, Kent, in 1644.

His verse was praised by Dryden and Pope; Milton was somewhat indebted to Sandys's Hymn to my Redeemer (inserted in his travels at the place of his visit to the Holy Sepulchre) in his Ode on the Passion.

== Travel and travel writing ==
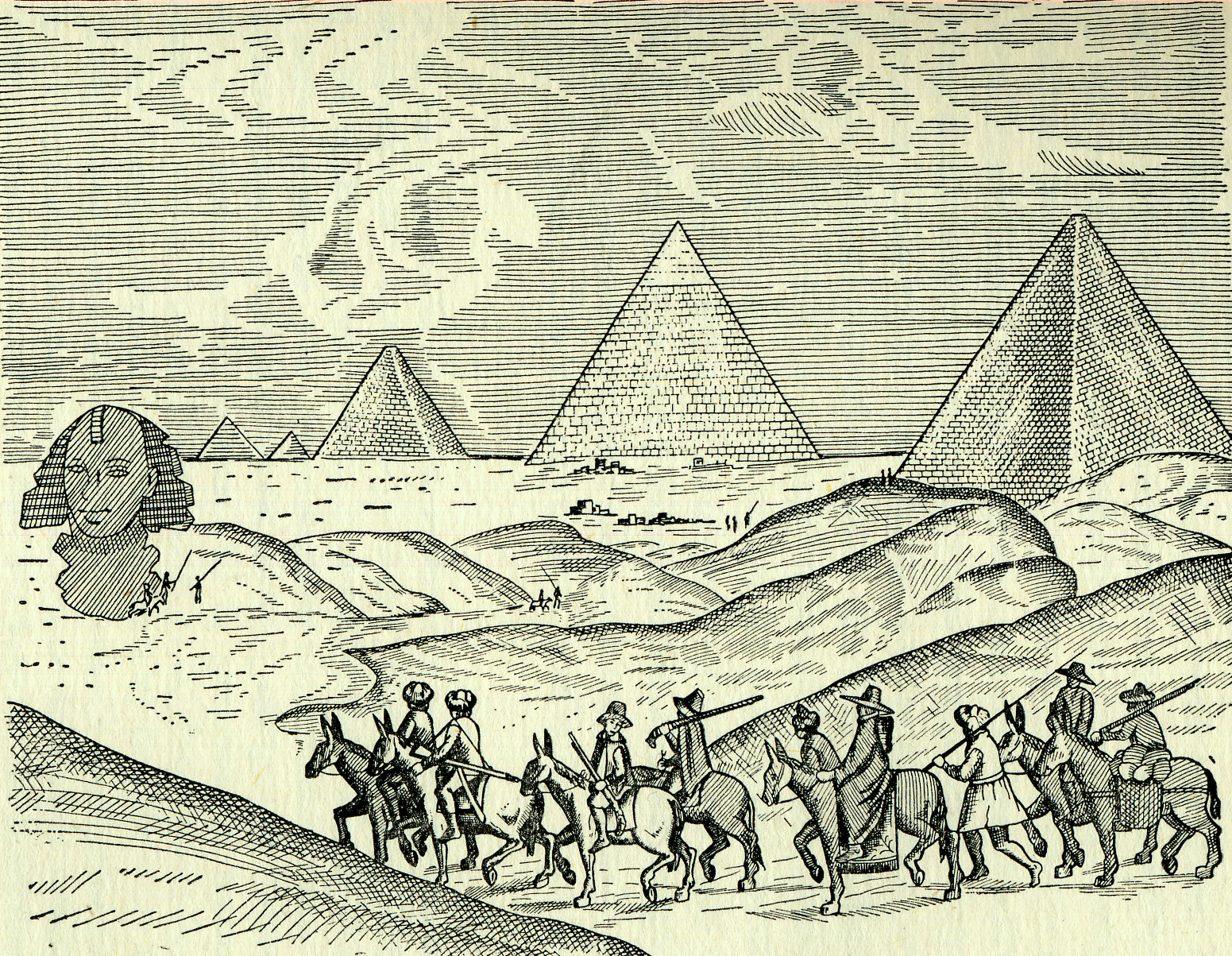
From The Relation of a Journey begun an. Dom. 1610

On his travels through Europe and the Middle East, he first visited France; from north Italy he passed by way of Venice to Constantinople, and thence to Egypt, Mount Sinai, Palestine, Cyprus, Sicily, Naples, and Rome. His narrative, was dedicated to Charles, Prince of Wales and formed a substantial contribution to geography and ethnology. Sandys' travel narrative appeared as The Relation of a Journey begun an. Dom. 1610, in four books. This remained a standard account of the Eastern Mediterranean, twice mentioned, for instance, by the English naval chaplain Henry Teonge in his diary of a voyage in 1675.

The writing of The Relation series was influenced by Sandys’ background, as he followed the footsteps of his eldest brother who had previously visited and written about Turkey and the Ottoman Empire. This work contributed to the debates concerning religious tolerance in the early 17th century: Sandys shows that contrary to beliefs of many Western Europeans, multiple religions did not automatically cause social unrest, as exemplified in his descriptions of the Ottoman Empire. Sandys also appears to have been one of the first non-Jewish travelers to refute the belief that Jews "naturally emit an unsavoury odour". The book was well-received in his time, becoming a standard account of the Eastern Mediterranean, although Sandys has later been critiqued for his attitude towards women in his writing by Lady Mary Wortley Montagu.

The seventh edition of The Relation of a Journey begun an. Dom. 1610, in four books combined the four books into a single volume, printed for John Williams junior at The Crown in Little Britain in London, 1673. This compilation volume included Sandys’ travels to all above mentioned locations, the first book containing a history of the state of the Turkish Empire, describing their laws, government, policy, military, justice system and commerce. The first book also included Sandys’ description of the Mohammedan religion (Islam), a description of Constantinople and the manner of living of its sultan, and a study of Greece and Greek religion and customs. The second book of The Relation of a Journey focused on Egypt and the surrounding area. Sandys gives an account of Egyptian antiquity and culture, as well as his voyage on the Nile river. The second book also includes descriptions of Armenia, Cairo, Rhodes, and a brief history of Alexandria, in decline during the time of Sandys’ visitation. His is the last mention of the tomb of Alexander the Great, although it is likely a mere repetition of the description given by Leo Africanus the earlier century. The third book of the series is a description of Palestine, the Holy Land and the Jewish and Christians living there at the time. In the fourth and final volume of the series present in the compilation Sandys Travels, Sandys discusses Italy and describes the islands near it: Cyprus, Crete, Malta, Sicily and the Aeolian Islands. The final volume also includes Sandys’ account of cities and other places of note he visited, amongst which Venice, where his journey began, and Rome. The compilation of these four works, Sandys Travels, includes fifty maps and images.

== Theology ==
Sandys adopted English Arminian theological views that were reflected in his writings. He included anti-calvinist commentaries in his Paraphrase upon the Psalms" (1636). He later translated Christus Patiens (1639) a theological and political drama of Arminian theologian Hugo Grotius.

== Family ==
His brother Edwin Sandys (same name as his father) was a politician and an influential member of the Virginia Company of London. George Sandys was an uncle of Richard Lovelace (1618–1657), an English poet in the seventeenth century.

Family tree of Edwin Sandys, Archbishop of York

Baron Sandys (1st creation) of the Vyne, 1523
William Sandys; 1470–1540; 1st Baron Sandys
Thomas Sandys d. 1560; 2nd Baron Sandys
William Sandys | Henry Sandys d. 1555 | Walter Sandys c. 1540–1609
Edwin Sandys; 1519–1588; Archbishop of York | William Sandys d. 1623; 3rd Baron Sandys | Miles Sandys c. 1520–1601
Sandys Baronet of Wilberton, 1611
Samuel Sandys; 1560–1623 | Edwin Sandys; 1561–1629 | also James, William, Margaret (Aucher), Thomas, Henry | Miles Sandys; 1563–1645; 1st Baronet | Anne Sandys; 1570–c. 1629 | George Sandys; 1578–1644 | Elizabeth Sandys | Edwin Sandys c. 1564–1608 | William Sandys; 1565–1641
Edwin Sandys; 1591–1623 | Henry Sandys c. 1607–1640 | Edwin Sandys d. 1642 | Miles Sandys d. 1654; 2nd Baronet | Anne Barne; 1587–1633 | Henry Sandys d. 1644; 5th Baron Sandys of the Vyne | Miles Sandys c. 1601–1636 | William Sandys c. 1607–1669 "Waterworks"
Sandys Baronet of Wilberton extinct, 1654
Samuel Sandys; 1615–1685 | Richard Sandys d. 1669 | Richard Lovelace; 1617–1657 | Francis Lovelace c. 1621–1675 | William Sandys; 1626–1668; 6th Baron Sandys | Henry Sandys d. c. 1680; 7th Baron Sandys | Edwin Sandys d. 1683; 8th Baron Sandys
Barony Sandys (1st creation) of the Vyne abeyant, 1683
Sandys Baronet of Northborne, 1684
Samuel Sandys c. 1637–1701 | Richard Sandys; 1670–1726; Baronet | James Madison; U.S. President
Sandys Baronet of Northborne extinct, 1726
Edwin Sandys; 1659–1699
Baron Sandys (2nd creation) of Ombersley, 1743
Samuel Sandys; 1695–1770; 1st Baron Sandys
Edwin Sandys; 1726–1797; 2nd Baron Sandys | Martin Sandys; 1729–1768
Baroness Sandys (3rd creation) of Ombersley, 1802
Mary Sandys; 1764–1836; 1st Baroness Sandys
Marquesses of Downshire; Barons Sandys

Disambiguation pages: Edwin Sandys · Henry Sandys · Miles Sandys · Samuel Sandys

- "Sandys (several articles used as source material)". History of Parliament.

== See also ==
- Lawrence Washington (1602–1653)

== Notes and references ==
=== Sources ===
- Ellison, James (2002). George Sandys: Travel, Colonialism, and Tolerance in the Seventeenth Century. Cambridge, UK: D.S. Brewer.

== Extra sources ==
- This work in turn cites:
  - Sandys' works as quoted above.
  - Rev. Richard Hooper's edition, with memoir, of The Poetical Works of George Sandys.
  - Alexander Brown's Genesis of the United States, pp. 546, 989, 992, 994–995, 1032, 1063.
  - Rogers, M.A.(1974). "Books from the Library of George Sandys." The Book Collector 23 no 3 (autumn):361-370.
  - Lee, Sidney (1897). "Sandys, George" . In Lee, Sidney (ed.). Dictionary of National Biography. Vol. 50. London: Smith, Elder & Co.
- Bancroft, George (1879). "Sandys, Edwin" . In Ripley, George; Dana, Charles A. (eds.). The American Cyclopædia.
