= Sandys baronets =

Extinct baronetcy in the Baronetage of England

Escutcheon of the Sandys baronets

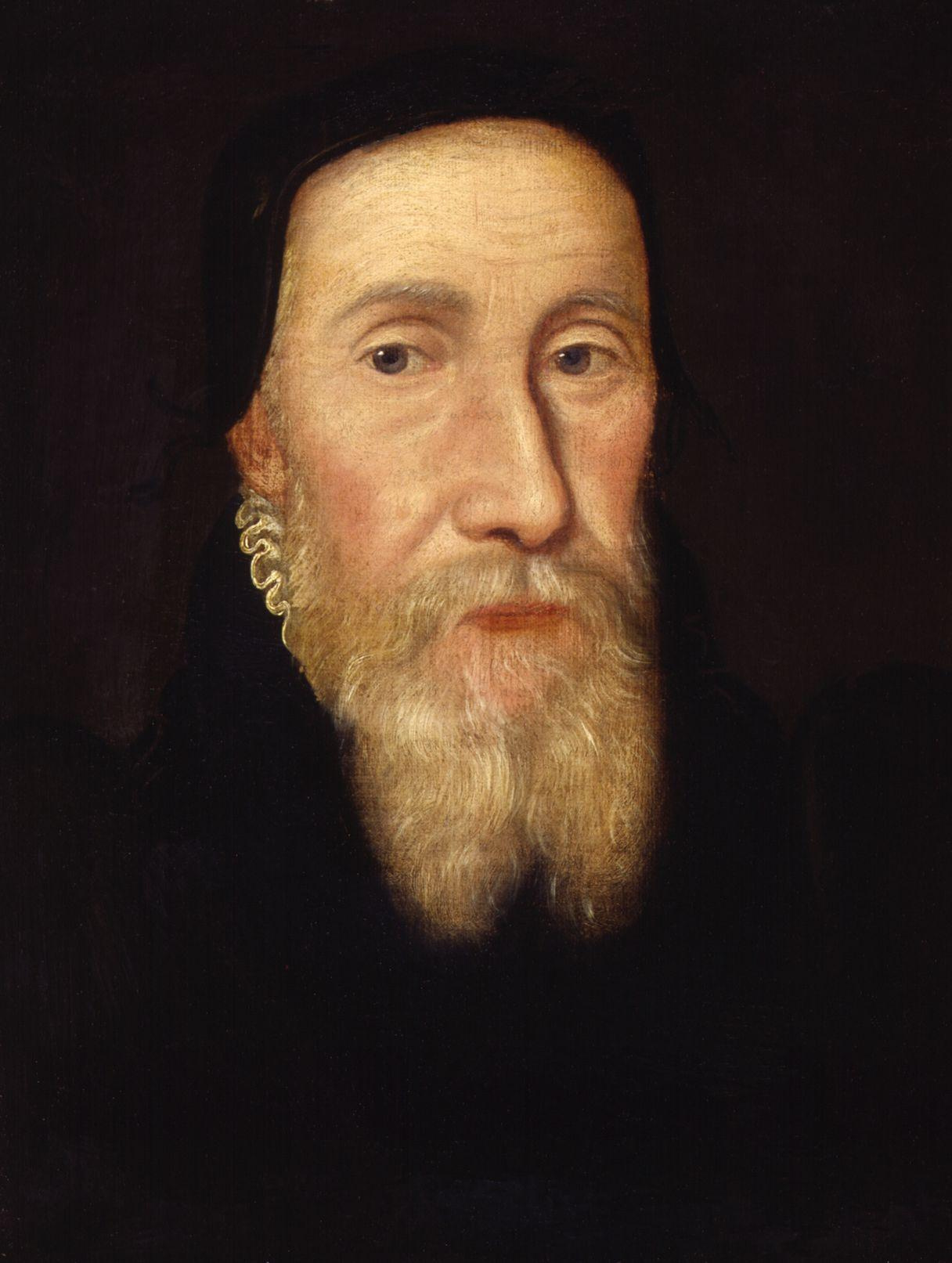
Edwin Sandys, Archbishop of York, ancestor of the Sandys baronets of Wilberton and Northborne

There have been two baronetcies created for members of the Sandys family, both in the Baronetage of England. Both creations are extinct.

The Sandys Baronetcy, of Wilberton in the County of Cambridge, was created in the Baronetage of England on 25 November 1611 for Sir Miles Sandys, Member of Parliament for Cambridge, Huntingdon and Cambridgeshire. He was the third son of Edwin Sandys, Archbishop of York. Sandys was succeeded by his eldest son, Miles, the second Baronet, who had already been knighted. The title became extinct when the latter died childless in 1654.

The Sandys Baronetcy, of Northborne in the County of Kent, was created in the Baronetage of England on 15 December 1684 for the fourteen-year-old Richard Sandys. He was the grandson of Edwin Sandys, of Northbourne Court, a colonel in the parliamentary army, elder son of Sir Edwin Sandys, second son of Edwin Sandys, Archbishop of York, and elder brother of Sir Miles Sandys, 1st Baronet, of Wilberton (see above). Sandys left only daughters and the title became extinct on his death in 1726.

Sir Samuel Sandys, of Ombersley, eldest brother of Sir Miles Sandys, 1st Baronet, of Wilberton, was the ancestor of the Barons Sandys (of the 1743 and 1802 creations). George Sandys, seventh son of Edwin Sandys, Archbishop of York, was a traveller and poet. Miles Sandys, brother of Edwin Sandys, Archbishop of York, was a courtier and politician.

The family surname is pronounced "Sands".

== Sandys baronets, of Wilberton (1611) ==
- Sir Miles Sandys, 1st Baronet (1563–1645)
- Sir Miles Sandys, 2nd Baronet (died 1654)

== Sandys baronets, of Northborne (1684) ==
- Sir Richard Sandys, 1st Baronet (1670–1726)

== Family tree ==
Family tree of Edwin Sandys, Archbishop of York

Baron Sandys (1st creation) of the Vyne, 1523
William Sandys; 1470–1540; 1st Baron Sandys
Thomas Sandys d. 1560; 2nd Baron Sandys
William Sandys	Henry Sandys d. 1555	Walter Sandys c. 1540–1609
Edwin Sandys; 1519–1588; Archbishop of York	William Sandys d. 1623; 3rd Baron Sandys	Miles Sandys c. 1520–1601
Sandys Baronet of Wilberton, 1611
Samuel Sandys; 1560–1623	Edwin Sandys; 1561–1629	also James, William, Margaret (Aucher), Thomas, Henry	Miles Sandys; 1563–1645; 1st Baronet	Anne Sandys; 1570–c. 1629	George Sandys; 1578–1644	Elizabeth Sandys	Edwin Sandys c. 1564–1608	William Sandys; 1565–1641
Edwin Sandys; 1591–1623	Henry Sandys c. 1607–1640	Edwin Sandys d. 1642	Miles Sandys d. 1654; 2nd Baronet	Anne Barne; 1587–1633	Henry Sandys d. 1644; 5th Baron Sandys of the Vyne	Miles Sandys c. 1601–1636	William Sandys c. 1607–1669 "Waterworks"
Sandys Baronet of Wilberton extinct, 1654
Samuel Sandys; 1615–1685	Richard Sandys d. 1669	Richard Lovelace; 1617–1657	Francis Lovelace c. 1621–1675	William Sandys; 1626–1668; 6th Baron Sandys	Henry Sandys d. c. 1680; 7th Baron Sandys	Edwin Sandys d. 1683; 8th Baron Sandys
Barony Sandys (1st creation) of the Vyne abeyant, 1683
Sandys Baronet of Northborne, 1684
Samuel Sandys c. 1637–1701	Richard Sandys; 1670–1726; Baronet	James Madison; U.S. President
Sandys Baronet of Northborne extinct, 1726
Edwin Sandys; 1659–1699
Baron Sandys (2nd creation) of Ombersley, 1743
Samuel Sandys; 1695–1770; 1st Baron Sandys
Edwin Sandys; 1726–1797; 2nd Baron Sandys	Martin Sandys; 1729–1768
Baroness Sandys (3rd creation) of Ombersley, 1802
Mary Sandys; 1764–1836; 1st Baroness Sandys
Marquesses of Downshire; Barons Sandys

Disambiguation pages: Edwin Sandys · Henry Sandys · Miles Sandys · Samuel Sandys

- "Sandys (several articles used as source material)". History of Parliament.

== See also ==
- Bayntun-Sandys Baronets
- Baron Sandys

Baronetage of England
Preceded by Ridgeway baronets	Sandys baronets 25 November 1611	Succeeded by Portman baronets
