= Henry Sandys, 5th Baron Sandys =

Colonel Henry Sandys, 5th Baron Sandys (died 6 April 1644), was an English nobleman and Cavalier officer in the English Civil War.

Sandys was the third and youngest, but only surviving, son of Sir Edwin Sandys MP (eldest son of Miles Sandys MP and nephew of Edwin Sandys, Archbishop of York) and his wife Elizabeth, daughter of William, 3rd Baron Sandys of The Vyne. Until their marriage in 1586, Sandys' parents were not related, their families having different origins: the family of Archbishop Sandys originated in Cumbria, while the Barons Sandys had their seat at The Vyne, Hampshire.

Sandys married Jane, daughter of Sir William Sandys of Miserden, Gloucestershire. They had the following children:

- William Sandys, 6th Baron Sandys
- Henry Sandys, 7th Baron Sandys
- Miles Sandys (died without offspring)
- Edwin Sandys, 8th Baron Sandys
- Hester Sandys, married Humphrey Noy, son of William Noy, Attorney General
- Alathea Sandys, married Francis Goston
- Mary Sandys, married Dr. Henry Savage, Master of Balliol College, Oxford
- Jane Sandys, married John Harris
- Margaret Sandys, married Sir John Mill Bt
- Margery Sandys, married Sir Edmund Fortescue Bt MP

Due to the Civil War, Sandys was never summoned to Parliament as a peer. Sandys fought on the royalist side, received a mortal wound at the Battle of Cheriton (at Bramdean near Alresford, Hampshire) on 29 March 1644, and died on 6 April.

Family tree of Edwin Sandys, Archbishop of York

William Sandys
Edwin Sandys (1519–1588); Archbishop of York	Miles Sandys MP (c. 1520–1601)
Baronet, 1611
Samuel Sandys MP (1560–1623)	Edwin Sandys MP (1561–1629)	also James, William, Margaret (Aucher), Thomas, Henry	Miles Sandys Bt MP (1563–1645)	Anne Sandys (1570–c. 1629) m. William Barne	George Sandys (1578–1644) poet	Edwin Sandys MP (c. 1564–1608) m. Elizabeth, dau. of William, 3rd Baron Sandys	William Sandys (1565–1641)
Edwin Sandys MP (1591–1623)	Henry Sandys MP (c. 1607–1640)	Edwin Sandys (d. 1642) killed in Civil War	Miles Sandys Bt (d. 1654)	Anne Barne (1587–1633) m(1) William Lovelace m(2) Jonathan Browne	Henry Sandys; 5th Baron Sandys (d. 1644) killed in Civil War m. Jane, dau. of William Sandys	Miles Sandys MP (c. 1601–1636)	William Sandys MP (c. 1607–1669) "Waterworks"
Samuel Sandys MP (1615–1685)	Richard Sandys (d. 1669)	Richard Lovelace (1617–1657) poet	Francis Lovelace (c. 1621–1675); Govr. of New York	William, 6th Baron; Henry, 7th Baron; Edwin, 8th Baron
Baronet, 1684
Samuel Sandys MP (c. 1637–1701)	Richard Sandys Bt (1670–1726)	James Madison; U.S. President
Edwin Sandys MP (1659–1699)
Baron Sandys, 1743
Samuel Sandys; 1st Baron Sandys (1695–1770); Chancellor of the Exchequer
Edwin Sandys; 2nd Baron Sandys (1726–1797)	Martin Sandys (1729–1768)
Baron Sandys, 1802
Mary Sandys; 1st Baroness Sandys (1764–1836) m. Arthur Hill, 2nd Marquess of Downshire
Marquesses of Downshire; Barons Sandys

Disambiguation pages: Edwin Sandys · Henry Sandys · Miles Sandys · Samuel Sandys
See also: Marquesses of Downshire family tree

Peerage of England
Preceded by William Sandys	Baron Sandys; 1629–1644	Succeeded by William Sandys
