= Edwin Sandys (1561–1629) =

English politician

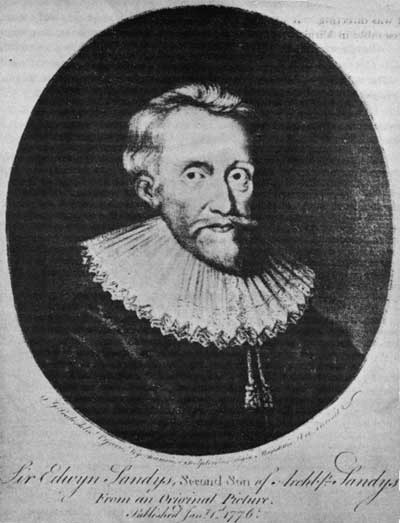
Sir Edwin Sandys, 1776 mezzotint by Valentine Green.

Sir Edwin Sandys (/ˈsændz/ SANDZ; 9 December 1561 – October 1629) was an English politician who was a member of the House of Commons at various times between 1589 and 1626. He was also one of the founders of the proprietary Virginia Company of London, which in 1607 established the first permanent English settlement in what is now the United States in the colony of Virginia, based at Jamestown. The parish of Sandys, in Bermuda (the Virginia Company's second colony) is named after him.

== Early life and career ==
Sandys (pronounced Sands) was born in Worcestershire, the second son of Edwin Sandys, Archbishop of York, and his wife Cecily Wilford. He received his education at Merchant Taylors' School, which he entered in 1571, and at Corpus Christi College, Oxford, (from 1577). He graduated B.A. in 1579 and was admitted fellow in the same year and B.C.L. in 1589. At Oxford his tutor was Richard Hooker, author of the Ecclesiastical Polity, whose lifelong friend and executor Sandys became. Sandys is said to have had a large share in securing the Mastership of the Temple Church in London for Hooker. In 1582 Sandys' father gave him the prebend of Wetwang in York Minster, but he never took orders, later resigning both his fellowship and prebendary. In 1589 he was elected Member of Parliament for Plympton Erle. He entered in the Middle Temple in 1589. In 1593 he was re-elected MP for Plympton Erle.

From 1593 to 1599 Sandys travelled abroad. When in Venice he became closely connected with Fra Paolo Sarpi, who helped him compose the treatise on the religious state of Europe, known as the Europae speculum. In 1605 this treatise was printed from a stolen copy under the title A Relation of the State of Religion in Europe. Sandys procured the suppression of this edition, but the book was reprinted at The Hague in 1629.

After 1599, in view of the approaching death of Queen Elizabeth I, Sandys paid his court to King James VI of Scotland, and on James's accession to the throne of England in 1603 Sandys received a knighthood.

== Career as MP ==
In 1604, he was a member of James's first parliament as MP for Stockbridge, and distinguished himself as one of the assailants of the great monopolies. He endeavoured to secure to all prisoners the right of employing counsel, a proposal which was resisted by some lawyers as subversive of the administration of the law.

In 1614 he was elected MP for Rochester. He was appointed High Sheriff of Kent for 1615-1616 - his country seat of Northborne was there.

Sandys was a member of the later parliaments of James I as MP for Sandwich in 1621, and for Kent in 1624.

On 16 June 1621 he and John Selden were taken into custody by order of the House of Commons, and not released until 18 July.

His tendencies were towards opposition, and he was suspected of hostility to the court; but he disarmed the anger of the king by professions of obedience. He was member for Penryn in the first parliament of Charles I in 1625 and again in 1626.

== Role in the Virginia Company ==
Coat of Arms of Edwin Sandys

Sandys had been connected with the East India Company before 1614, and took an active part in its affairs until 1629. His most memorable services were, however, rendered to the Virginia Company of London, to which he became treasurer in 1619 (succeeding Thomas Smythe). He instituted a program designed to give investors and settlers incentive to emigrate to the New World. His program granted some of Virginia's land to the people who chose to live there, providing "ancient planters" who had arrived before 1616 with one hundred acres each with settlers coming after 1616 getting fifty acres. He also sent several hundred tenant farmers to work land set aside for the company while urging the production of more than just tobacco for export.

In order to increase labour in Virginia, his program also promoted indentured servitude for the poor of England who could try to make a better life for themselves in the colony. These policies created a boom period of growth for Virginia. The large amount of labour available and the condition by which they made the journey led to exploitation of servants and tenants while allowing large farmer owners to also exploit the Virginia Company.

Sandys strongly supported the headright system, for his goal was a permanent colony which would enlarge English territory, relieve the nation's overpopulation, and expand the market for English goods. Also accredited to Sandys is an increase in women sent to the colonies, for the purpose of encouraging men to marry "tobacco brides" and start families, which ostensibly would motivate them to work harder.

Edwin Sandys was also one of the men instrumental in establishing the first representative assembly in the new world at Jamestown by issuing a new charter calling for its establishment. In addition, he assisted the Pilgrims in establishing their colony at Plymouth, Massachusetts by lending them 300 pounds without interest. This led to Sandys being accused in 1624 by Sir Nathaniel Rich of having republican sympathies and of trying to establish a 'Brownist Republic' in Virginia. This was an accusation not entirely without foundation, as the colonial project had from the outset quasi-republican overtones.

Although Sandys never travelled to Virginia, he worked tirelessly in England to support the effort. He promoted and supported the policy which enabled the colony to survive the disasters of its early days, and, he continued to be a leading influence in the Company until it was dissolved in 1624.

Although the Virginia Company ultimately failed financially by 1624, the colony eventually grew and prospered until achieving independence late in the 18th century following the American Revolutionary War.

Sandys' brother Thomas Sands (Sandys) was one of the first colonist in Jamestown, he survived the "Starving Times" and later returned to England.

== Theological positions ==
Edwin Sandys shared with his brother George a leaning toward English Arminian theology and rejected Calvinist predestinarianism. Through his writings he also positioned himself theologically, and is described as a proto-Arminian. Because of his anti-Calvinist views, he won the attention of the leading Dutch Arminian Hugo Grotius.

== Later life and legacy ==
Sandys died in October 1629, leaving a £1500 endowment to the University of Oxford to fund a lecture in metaphysics.

Sandys is buried in Northbourne Church in Kent with his last wife Catherine.

== Family ==
Sandys was married four times:

1. Margaret Eveleigh, daughter of John Eveleigh of Devonshire, with whom he had one daughter.
  - Elizabeth, who married Sir Thomas Wilsford of Hedding, Kent
2. Anne Southcott, daughter of Thomas Southcott, with whom he had no issue.
3. Elizabeth Nevinson, daughter of Thomas Nevinson of Eastrey with whom he had one daughter.
  - Anne
4. Catherine Bulkeley, daughter of Sir Richard Bulkeley of Anglesey, with whom he had seven sons and five daughters.
  - Henry (c. 1607–1640), of Wadham College, Oxford 1621 and Gray's Inn 1627, MP for Mitchell
  - Edwin Sandys (Parliamentarian) (died 1642), of Wadham College, Oxford 1621, Colonel in the Parliamentary Army, died of wounds suffered at the Battle of Powick Bridge
  - Mary (1607–1675), married Sir Richard Spencer
  - Richard (1608–1665), Colonel in the Parliamentary Army, Governor of the Bermuda Company
  - Elizabeth
  - Francis
  - Robert, of Corpus Christi College, Oxford 1631 and Gray's Inn 1637
  - Penelope (1617–1690), married Sir Nicholas Lechmere
  - Thomas, of Corpus Christi College, Oxford 1635 and Gray's Inn 1639
  - Catherine
  - Frances
  - a son (died young)

Sandys' great-grandson Richard Sandys became a baronet in 1684. His brother Sir Miles Sandys, 1st Baronet was also appointed a baronet, and sat as MP, and was High Sheriff of Cambridgeshire and Huntingdonshire. Sandys Parish, Bermuda, which includes Somerset Village and the Royal Naval Dockyard, is named after him.

Family tree of Edwin Sandys, Archbishop of York

Baron Sandys (1st creation) of the Vyne, 1523
William Sandys; 1470–1540; 1st Baron Sandys
Thomas Sandys d. 1560; 2nd Baron Sandys
William Sandys	Henry Sandys d. 1555	Walter Sandys c. 1540–1609
Edwin Sandys; 1519–1588; Archbishop of York	William Sandys d. 1623; 3rd Baron Sandys	Miles Sandys c. 1520–1601
Sandys Baronet of Wilberton, 1611
Samuel Sandys; 1560–1623	Edwin Sandys; 1561–1629	also James, William, Margaret (Aucher), Thomas, Henry	Miles Sandys; 1563–1645; 1st Baronet	Anne Sandys; 1570–c. 1629	George Sandys; 1578–1644	Elizabeth Sandys	Edwin Sandys c. 1564–1608	William Sandys; 1565–1641
Edwin Sandys; 1591–1623	Henry Sandys c. 1607–1640	Edwin Sandys d. 1642	Miles Sandys d. 1654; 2nd Baronet	Anne Barne; 1587–1633	Henry Sandys d. 1644; 5th Baron Sandys of the Vyne	Miles Sandys c. 1601–1636	William Sandys c. 1607–1669 "Waterworks"
Sandys Baronet of Wilberton extinct, 1654
Samuel Sandys; 1615–1685	Richard Sandys d. 1669	Richard Lovelace; 1617–1657	Francis Lovelace c. 1621–1675	William Sandys; 1626–1668; 6th Baron Sandys	Henry Sandys d. c. 1680; 7th Baron Sandys	Edwin Sandys d. 1683; 8th Baron Sandys
Barony Sandys (1st creation) of the Vyne abeyant, 1683
Sandys Baronet of Northborne, 1684
Samuel Sandys c. 1637–1701	Richard Sandys; 1670–1726; Baronet	James Madison; U.S. President
Sandys Baronet of Northborne extinct, 1726
Edwin Sandys; 1659–1699
Baron Sandys (2nd creation) of Ombersley, 1743
Samuel Sandys; 1695–1770; 1st Baron Sandys
Edwin Sandys; 1726–1797; 2nd Baron Sandys	Martin Sandys; 1729–1768
Baroness Sandys (3rd creation) of Ombersley, 1802
Mary Sandys; 1764–1836; 1st Baroness Sandys
Marquesses of Downshire; Barons Sandys

Disambiguation pages: Edwin Sandys · Henry Sandys · Miles Sandys · Samuel Sandys

- "Sandys (several articles used as source material)". History of Parliament.

== See also ==
- George Sandys
- Richard Lovelace

Parliament of England
Preceded by Richard More; Jasper Cholmley	Member of Parliament for Plympton Erle; 1589–1593; With: Richard Grafton 1589; Richard Southcote 1593	Succeeded by George Southcote; Edward Hancock
Preceded by Edward Savage; Thomas Grymes	Member of Parliament for Stockbridge; 1604–1611; With: Sir William Fortescue	Succeeded by Sir Henry Wallop; Sir Walter Cope
Preceded by Sir Edward Hoby; Sir Thomas Walsingham	Member of Parliament for Rochester; 1614; With: Sir Thomas Walsingham	Succeeded by Sir Thomas Walsingham (younger); Henry Clerke
Preceded by Sir Thomas Smythe; Sir Samuel Peyton, 1st Baronet	Member of Parliament for Sandwich; 1621–1622; With: Sir Robert Hatton 1621; John Burroughes 1621–1622	Succeeded by Sir Robert Hatton; Francis Drake
Preceded by Viscount Lisle; Sir George Fane	Member of Parliament for Kent; 1624; With: Nicholas Tufton	Succeeded by Mildmay Fane; Sir Albert Moreton
Preceded by Edward Roberts; Sir Robert Killigrew	Member of Parliament for Penryn; 1625–1626; With: Edward Roberts	Succeeded by William Killigrew; Sir Thomas Edmunds
