= Edwin Sandys (bishop) =

Archbishop of York from 1576 to 1588

The Most Reverend Edwin Sandys
- Archbishop of York
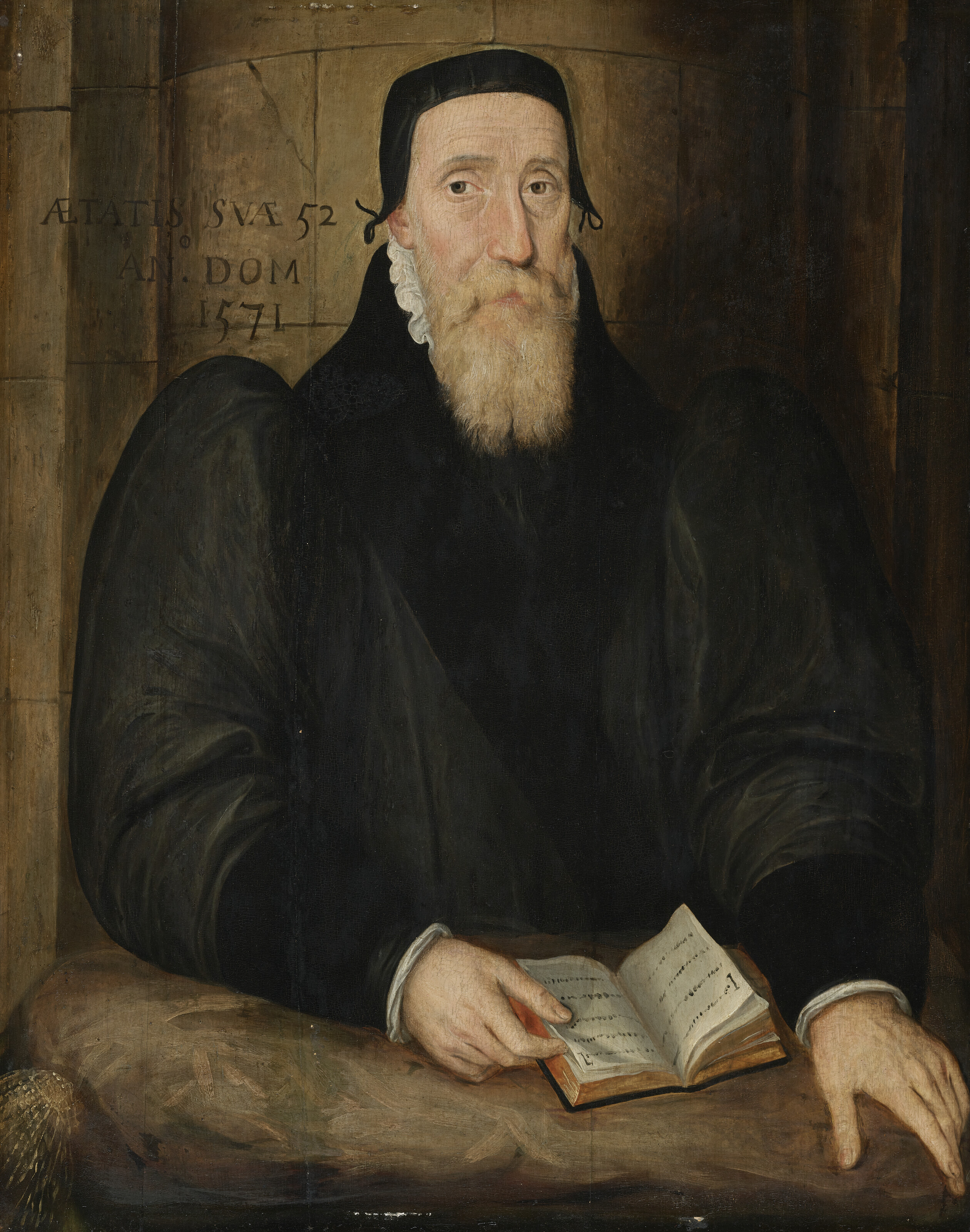
- As bishop of London, 1571
- Installed: 1576
- Term ended: 1588
- Predecessor: Edmund Grindal
- Successor: John Piers
- Other posts: Bishop of Worcester (1559–1570); Bishop of London (1570–1576)

Orders
- Consecration: 21 December 1559 by Matthew Parker

Personal details
- Born: c. 1519 Esthwaite Hall
- Died: 10 July 1588
- Buried: Southwell Minster
- Spouse: Mary Sandys; Cecily Wilford
- Education: St John's College, Cambridge

Edwin Sandys (/ˈsændz/; 1519 – 10 July 1588) was an English prelate. He was Anglican Bishop of Worcester (1559–1570), London (1570–1576) and Archbishop of York (1576–1588) during the reign of Elizabeth I of England. He was one of the translators of the Bishops' Bible.

== Early years and education ==
Edwin was born in 1519 to William Sandys, esq. of Esthwaite Hall and Graythwaite Hall, and Margaret Dixon, daughter of Sir John Dixon.

Sandys' place of education is not recorded, but historians believe that Edwin Sandys was educated alongside Edmund Grindal at St Bees Priory, and taught by the Marian martyr John Bland. Sandys recalled that he and Grindal lived "familiarly" and "as brothers" and were only separated between Sandys's 13th and 18th Years. A branch of the Sandys family lived at Rottington Hall near St Bees, and were known to the heralds in 1563 as "...of St Bees in the County of Cumberland". Edwin Sandys followed Edmund Grindal in his subsequent career, succeeding him as Bishop of London, and then Archbishop of York.

Sandys went up to St John's College, Cambridge, graduating BA in 1539 and then a Doctor of Divinity ten years later. In 1547 he was elected master of Catharine Hall, and by the death of Edward VI in 1553 he was Vice Chancellor of the university.

== Exile ==
On the death of King Edward VI, the Duke of Northumberland sought to avoid a Roman Catholic monarchy by placing Lady Jane Grey on the throne. He and his followers arrived in Cambridge to raise an army in East Anglia and demanded that Edwin Sandys preach a sermon. When the rebellion failed and Mary Tudor took the throne, Edwin was arrested and taken to the Tower of London. For this he is mentioned in Foxe's Book of Martyrs. Later he was moved to more comfortable conditions in Marshalsea prison where he made friends with the prison keeper who connived at his escape.

He went first to Antwerp and then Augsburg and Strasbourg where his wife joined him. His wife and infant son died there of a plague. He then lived in Zürich until the accession of Elizabeth I made it safe for him to return to England; on the day of Elizabeth's coronation. On 19 February 1559 he married Cicely Wilford, sister of James Wilford.

== Archbishop of York ==
On his return he became successively Bishop of Worcester, Bishop of London and Archbishop of York. He helped in the translation of a new version of the Bishops' Bible. Sandys's own personal copy may be seen in the Hawkshead Grammar School Museum in Cumbria.

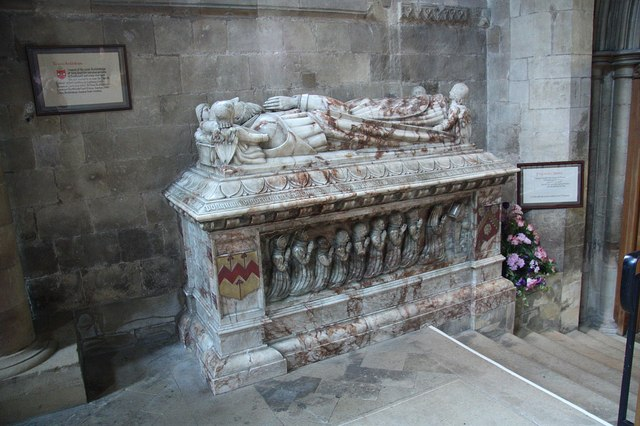
Memorial in Southwell Minster

Along with other Marian exiles, who returned to positions of wealth and importance, Archbishop Sandys was concerned that true religion and sound learning would forever flourish in the land. They saw the necessity of education for religion's sake and the need for the Church of England to hold their own in discussion with Roman Catholics. To these ends Edwin Sandys founded Hawkshead Grammar School in 1585 and endowed it with sufficient land and property for it to offer a free education.

Sandys died on 10 July 1588, and was buried in Southwell Minster in Nottinghamshire.

== Family ==
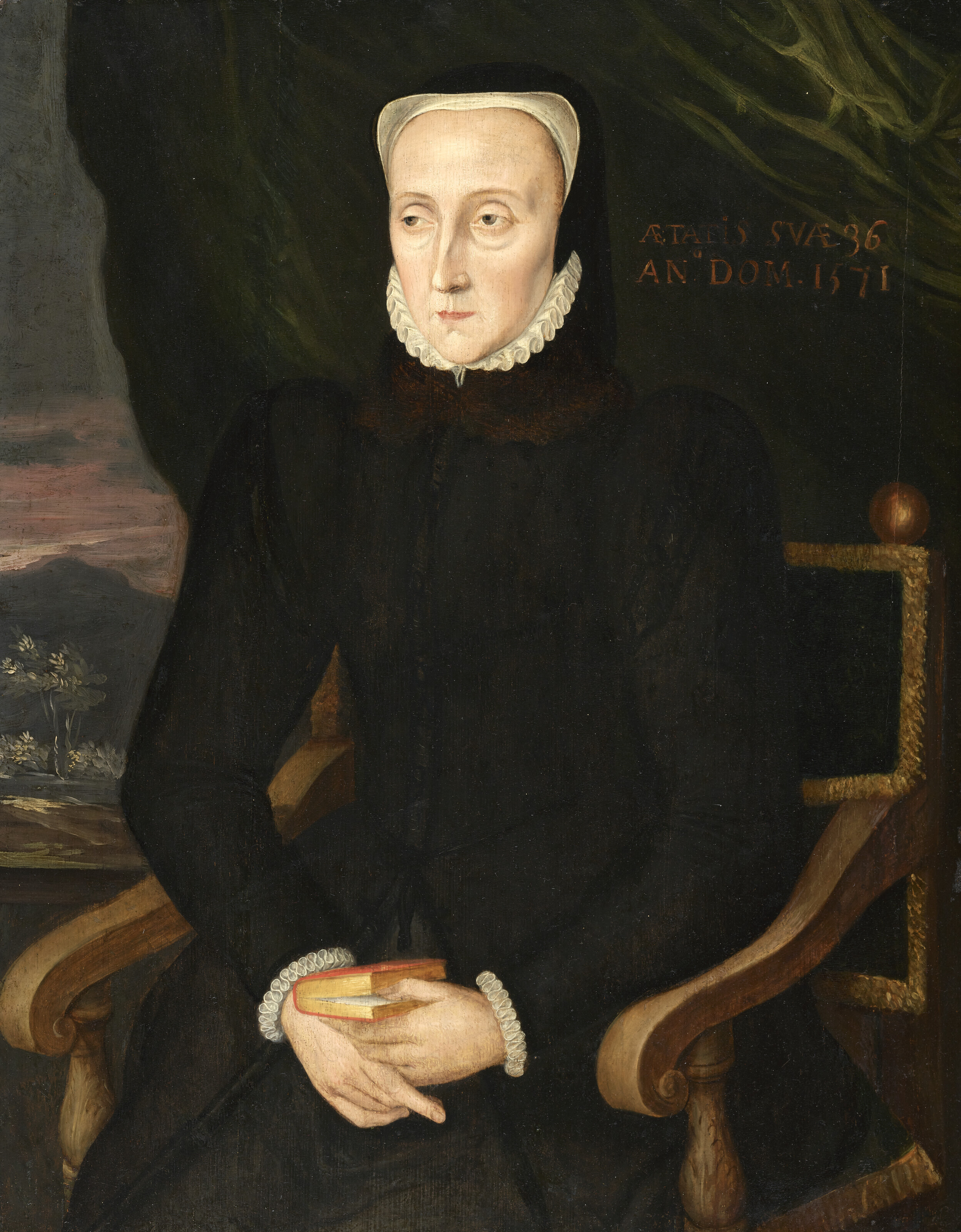
Sandys's second wife, Cicely Wilford, in 1571

Sandys was twice married. His first wife, Mary Sandys, died in 1558 at Strasbourg. They had one son:

- James Sandys (died 1557, Strasbourg)

On 19 February 1559, Sandys married Cicely Wilford, daughter of Thomas Wilford and sister of James Wilford. They had the following children:

- Sir Samuel Sandys MP JP (1560–1623)
- Sir Edwin Sandys MP (1561–1629), Treasurer of the Virginia Company of London
- Sir Miles Sandys Bt MP (1563–1645)
- William Sandys (born 1565), died young
- Margaret Sandys (1566–1611), married Anthony Aucher, and gave birth to Elizabeth Archer, who married Sir William Hammond.
- Thomas Sandys (1568–c. 1634), colonist, a first settler of Jamestown, Virginia
- Anne Sandys (1570–c. 1629), married Sir William Barne
- Henry Sandys (1572–1626)
- George Sandys (1578–1644), traveller and poet, colonist in Virginia

In 1604 Cicely Sandys enlisted the support of Anne of Denmark in an unsuccessful attempt to found a university at Ripon in Yorkshire.

The Sandys family seat is now Graythwaite Hall, a few miles south of Esthwaite.

Family tree of Edwin Sandys, Archbishop of York

Baron Sandys (1st creation) of the Vyne, 1523
William Sandys; 1470–1540; 1st Baron Sandys
Thomas Sandys d. 1560; 2nd Baron Sandys
William Sandys	Henry Sandys d. 1555	Walter Sandys c. 1540–1609
Edwin Sandys; 1519–1588; Archbishop of York	William Sandys d. 1623; 3rd Baron Sandys	Miles Sandys c. 1520–1601
Sandys Baronet of Wilberton, 1611
Samuel Sandys; 1560–1623	Edwin Sandys; 1561–1629	also James, William, Margaret (Aucher), Thomas, Henry	Miles Sandys; 1563–1645; 1st Baronet	Anne Sandys; 1570–c. 1629	George Sandys; 1578–1644	Elizabeth Sandys	Edwin Sandys c. 1564–1608	William Sandys; 1565–1641
Edwin Sandys; 1591–1623	Henry Sandys c. 1607–1640	Edwin Sandys d. 1642	Miles Sandys d. 1654; 2nd Baronet	Anne Barne; 1587–1633	Henry Sandys d. 1644; 5th Baron Sandys of the Vyne	Miles Sandys c. 1601–1636	William Sandys c. 1607–1669 "Waterworks"
Sandys Baronet of Wilberton extinct, 1654
Samuel Sandys; 1615–1685	Richard Sandys d. 1669	Richard Lovelace; 1617–1657	Francis Lovelace c. 1621–1675	William Sandys; 1626–1668; 6th Baron Sandys	Henry Sandys d. c. 1680; 7th Baron Sandys	Edwin Sandys d. 1683; 8th Baron Sandys
Barony Sandys (1st creation) of the Vyne abeyant, 1683
Sandys Baronet of Northborne, 1684
Samuel Sandys c. 1637–1701	Richard Sandys; 1670–1726; Baronet	James Madison; U.S. President
Sandys Baronet of Northborne extinct, 1726
Edwin Sandys; 1659–1699
Baron Sandys (2nd creation) of Ombersley, 1743
Samuel Sandys; 1695–1770; 1st Baron Sandys
Edwin Sandys; 1726–1797; 2nd Baron Sandys	Martin Sandys; 1729–1768
Baroness Sandys (3rd creation) of Ombersley, 1802
Mary Sandys; 1764–1836; 1st Baroness Sandys
Marquesses of Downshire; Barons Sandys

Disambiguation pages: Edwin Sandys · Henry Sandys · Miles Sandys · Samuel Sandys

- "Sandys (several articles used as source material)". History of Parliament.

Academic offices
Preceded by Reginald Bainbrigge	Master of St Catharine's College, Cambridge; 1547–1554	Succeeded by Edmund Cosyn
Preceded by Edward Hawford	Vice-Chancellor of Cambridge University; 1552–1553	Succeeded by John Young
Church of England titles
Preceded by Richard Pate	Bishop of Worcester; 1559–1570	Succeeded by Nicholas Bullingham
Preceded by Edmund Grindal	Bishop of London; 1570–1576	Succeeded by John Aylmer
Preceded by Edmund Grindal	Archbishop of York; 1577–1588	Succeeded by John Piers
