= Sandys (surname) =

Sandys is a surname of Old English origin. It is an older spelling of Sands, and is now usually pronounced as such.

People with the surname include:

- Charles Sandys (1786–1859), English antiquarian
- Duncan Sandys (1908–1987), British politician
- Edwin Sandys (disambiguation)
- Edwina Sandys (born 1938), British artist
- Elspeth Sandys (born 1940), New Zealand author
- Emma Sandys (1843–1877), English painter
- Frederick Sandys (1829–1904), British painter, illustrator and draughtsman
- George Sandys (1577–1644), English traveller, colonist, poet and translator
- George Sandys (politician) (1875–1937), British diplomat and politician
- Henry Sandys (MP) (c. 1607–1640), English politician
- Henry Sandys, 5th Baron Sandys (died 1644), English nobleman and Cavalier officer
- John Sandys (classicist) (1844–1922), British classical scholar
- John Sandys (priest) (c. 1550–1586), Roman Catholic priest and martyr
- John Sandys (MP), late 14th-century Member of Parliament for Hampshire
- Laura Sandys (born 1964), British politician
- Marcus Sandys, 3rd Baron Sandys (1798–1863), British politician
- Mary Hill, Marchioness of Downshire (1764–1836), née Sandys
- Miles Sandys (died 1601) (c. 1520–1601), English courtier and politician
- Miles Sandys (died 1636) (c. 1601–1636), English politician and author
- Sir Miles Sandys, 1st Baronet (1563–1645), English landowner and politician
- Nehemiah Sandys of Sandfield, High Sheriff of Roscommon (1788)
- Robert Sandys, High Sheriff of Roscommon (1683, 1685)
- Samuel Sandys (disambiguation)
- Thomas Sandys (disambiguation)
- Walter Sandys (died 1435) (c. 1376–1435), English politician
- Walter Sandys (died 1609) (c. 1540–1609), English politician
- William Sandys (disambiguation)

== See also ==
- Baron Sandys
- Sandys baronets
- Sandy (surname)
- Sandys (disambiguation)
