= Lord Sandys =

Lord Sandys may refer to:

- Baron Sandys, a British title that has been created three times, currently held by the Marquess of Downshire
- Duncan Sandys (1908–1987), British government minister, created Baron Duncan-Sandys for life in 1974
