= Edwin Sandys (Parliamentarian) =

English Parlmentarian Colonel

Edwin Sandys (1612 – December 1642) was an English Colonel in the Parliamentarian Army under Robert Devereux, 3rd Earl of Essex at the start of the First English Civil War. He was educated at Wadham College, Oxford and lived at the family seat in Northbourne, Kent. He is known for leading troops in the Iconoclasm and Looting of Canterbury Cathedral and Rochester Cathedral, which were the first attacks on cathedrals by parliamentary soldiers. Sandys was also a key leader in fighting in the first battle of the First English Civil War.

Escutcheon of the Sandys baronets

There have been two baronetcies created for members of the Sandys family, both in the Baronetage of England. Both creations are extinct.

== Family ==
Edwin Sandys was the son of Edwin Sandys (died 1629)

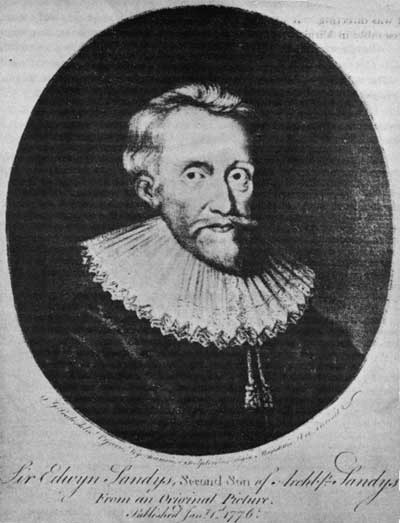
Sir Edwin Sandys, 1776 mezzotint by Valentine Green.

His father was an English politician, famous for coining the phrase 'honesty is the best policy', younger brother of Henry Sandys (MP) and grandson of former Archbishop of York Edwin Sandys (bishop). When his father died, Henry Sandys was executor of his father's will, which was problematic as his father left significant debts, despite significant share holdings in the Virginia Company and the Somers Isles Company, now better known as Bermuda. Their father's profits from these ventures were much less than what was owed. Edwin Sandys (died 1629) specified in his will that the profits of his estate should pay his debts, until 1633. Henry Sandys gained control of the estate in 1634 upon the death of his mother. Henry incurred significant debts and had no income from the estate. As a result, Henry Sandys invoked a clause in his father's will that allowed him to delay the release of parts of the estate to his younger brothers. In 1638, Edwin undertook litigation against his brother, but was unsuccessful.

In 1637, Henry Sandys drew up his own will and also, following his father, made provision for his debts to be paid. It appeared he did not trust Edwin to be the executor of his will, as he chose his younger brother Richard. Upon Henry's death, Edwin again litigated, but also took direct action. In the autumn of 1640, he descended on Northbourne with an armed gang and evicted his brother Richard at gunpoint. Edwin's behaviour with his own family was a precursor to his subsequent actions.

== First English Civil War ==
Sandys was commissioned a deputy lieutenant of Kent by Parliament in July 1642 to raise troops in Kent. By early August 1642, he was directed to seek out supporters of Charles I of England and collect arms and plate to finance and to arm the Parliamentarian Army.

Parliament first instructed Sandys to intercept Sir John Sackville, factor of Royalist Edward Sackville, 4th Earl of Dorset of Knole. They apprehended him on his way to church in Sevenoaks on Sunday 14 August 1642. Sir John was transported to Fleet Prison and five wagon loads of food, valuable items and weapons were confiscated. Sandys claimed to have recovered enough arms to support 500-600 troops. However, a subsequent report to the House of Lords stated an inventory of what had been taken showed it was a fifth of that amount. Sandys then moved to confiscate the arms of George Stewart, 9th Seigneur d'Aubigny at Cobham Hall and John Tufton, 2nd Earl of Thanet from Hothfield, both prominent royalists. The soldiers then moved on to ransack the houses of Sir Edward Dering, 1st Baronet, Sir William Butler and Robert Filmer.

On 23 August 1642, Sandys troops arrested Christopher Roper, 4th Baron Teynham in Rochester. The following day, Sandys' soldiers took part in Looting and defilement of Rochester Cathedral.

Sandys then led his soldiers to Canterbury Cathedral where they arrived on 26 August 1642 in search of gunpowder held in the cathedral and to arrest the Dean of Canterbury, Isaac Bargrave. The Dean was absent and Sandys arrested him in Gravesend and transported him to Fleet Prison. Bargrave had previously saved Sandys from execution, intervening after he had been indicted for rape in Maidstone.

The following day, Sandys troops combined with those of Michael Livesey locked the Cathedral chapter out. By the account of Sub Dean Thomas Paske the soldiers set about the cathedral and seemed to be in a fight with God himself. In Bruno Ryves account of the destruction of the cathedral, in Mecurius Rusticus, published in 1643, he charged Sandys with overseeing wholesale destruction inside the cathedral listing stalls, velvet, tables, books and altar rails destroyed. He outlines the destruction of windows, monuments of the dead and destruction of images of Christ, which included firing 40 volleys of gunfire at the image of Christ on the main gate to the cathedral. Bruno Ryves was Chaplain to King Charles I and Thomas Paske credited Sandys with halting the destruction of the cathedral. Paske, is the only primary source, but also would have known Sandys and been under the risk of his potential retribution when he wrote his letter. Ryves faithfully follows Paske's account, and only differed on blaming Sandys, not Sergeant-Major Cockaine. It is unlikely a Sergeant-Major would have undertaken the destruction of the founding cathedral of English Christianity without his Colonel's permission, and the precedent of Rochester Cathedral had been set. William Somner's account of the state of the Cathedral at the Stuart Restoration outlines the damage done to the cathedral, which were perilous.

== Death ==
On 23 September 1642, barely a month after the defilement at Canterbury and Rochester Cathedrals, Sandys was a leader at the disastrous rout for the Parliamentarians at the Battle of Powick Bridge. Sandys was mortally wounded having bravely led an ill-fated charge against forces commanded by Prince Rupert of the Rhine, in the first skirmish of the Civil War, but did not die until December 1642. Rumours emerged that he had resiled his support for Parliament and regretted his disloyalty to the King. Sandys wrote a letter to Parliament decrying the rumours as lies and his response was read out loud on Tuesday 7 October 1642 and accepted by Parliament.
