= William Morton (judge) =

English judge and politician

The Honourable Sir William Morton KS

Justice of the King's Bench
- In office 23 November 1665 – 23 September 1672

Personal details
- Born: 1605 Newcastle, Northumberland
- Died: 23 September 1672
- Education: Trinity College, Oxford
- Profession: MP, Judge

Lieutenant Colonel Sir William Morton KS (1605 – 23 September 1672) was an English judge and politician who sat in the House of Commons in 1640 and from 1663 to 1665. He fought on the Royalist side in the English Civil War.

== Life ==
Morton was born in Newcastle, Northumberland, the son of James Morton of Clifton-on-Severn, Worcestershire and his wife Jane Cookes. He was admitted at Sidney Sussex College, Cambridge on 30 June 1618 and matriculated at Trinity College, Oxford in October 1621 aged 15. He was awarded BA from Cambridge in 1622. He was admitted at Inner Temple on 22 October 1622. He received MA in 1625 and was called to the bar on 28 November 1630, beginning his career as a barrister.

Morton married Anne Smyth daughter of John Smyth of Kidlington, Oxfordshire.

In April 1640, Morton was elected Member of Parliament for Evesham in the Short Parliament. After the outbreak of the English Civil War he became a ferverent supporter of the Royalists, being described at the time as

active and violent...of a high spirit and bold...most obnoxious to the justice of Parliament.

Serving as High Sheriff of Gloucestershire and in Lord Chandos's Regiment of Horse, Morton was knighted by Charles I on 8 September 1643, and later promoted to Lieutenant Colonel and made commander of the garrison of Sudeley Castle. The castle fell on 8 June 1644, after one of his officers betrayed the Royalists, and Morton and 300 of his men were taken to the Tower of London. On 1 October 1647, he was ordered to be removed to Peter House. He was eventually released, becoming a Bencher of the Inner Temple on 24 November 1659.

At the Restoration, Morton became Serjeant-at-Law on 6 July 1660, Recorder of Gloucester on 18 April 1662 and King's Serjeant on 1 July 1663. In 1663, he was elected MP for Haverfordwest, serving on 12 committees, and sat until 1665. He served as a Justice of the King's Bench under Sir Matthew Hale from 23 November 1665 until his death on 23 September 1672.

Morton died aged 68 and was buried in the Temple Church, London on 1 October 1672 where there is a monument.

Parliament of England
Vacant Parliament suspended since 1629	Member of Parliament for Evesham; 1640; With: William Sandys	Succeeded by William Sandys; Richard Cresheld
Preceded by Isaac Lloyd	Member of Parliament for Haverfordwest; 1663 – 1665	Succeeded by Sir Frederick Hyde
