= Jonathan Browne =

English clergyman (1601–1643)

Jonathan Browne (1601 – 19 December 1643) was an Anglican clergyman, Dean of Hereford from 1637 until his death.

Browne was educated at Gloucester Hall, Oxford, matriculating on 13 October 1620, aged 19, and graduating BCL (1625), DCL (1630).

He held the following church preferments:

- Rector of Shelley, Essex (1621)
- Rector of St Faith's, London (1628)
- Rector of Hertingfordbury, Hertfordshire (1630)
- President of Sion College (1636–1637)
- Canon of Hereford Cathedral (1636)
- Dean of Hereford (1636–1643)
- Canon of Westminster Abbey (1639–1643)

He died on 19 December 1643, and was buried at Hertingfordbury, without any memorial. His will (undated and unregistered) was proved on 8 April 1645.

== Family ==
On 20 January 1631, Browne married Anne Lovelace née Barne, daughter of Sir William Barne, widow of Sir William Lovelace, mother by her first marriage of Richard Lovelace the poet and Francis Lovelace, colonial Governor of New York.

Browne's daughter Anne married Herbert Croft, who succeeded Browne as Dean of Hereford, then became Bishop of Hereford.

Browne's grandson (Croft and Anne's son) was Sir Herbert Croft Bt MP.

Church of England titles
| Preceded by John Richardson | Dean of Hereford; 1637–1643 | Succeeded by Herbert Croft |
