= Edwin Sandys =

Edwin Sandys may refer to:

- Edwin Sandys (bishop) (1519–1588), Bishop of London, Worcester, Archbishop of York
- Sir Edwin Sandys (1561–1629), founder of the colony of Virginia, son of the archbishop
- Sir Edwin Sandys (died 1608) (c. 1564–1608), English politician
- Sir Edwin Sandys (died 1623) (1591–1623), English politician
- Edwin Sandys (Parliamentarian) (1612–1642)
- Edwin Sandys (MP for Worcestershire) (1659–1699), British politician
- Edwin Sandys, 2nd Baron Sandys (1726–1797)
- Edwin Sandys (priest) (1642–1705), English Anglican priest
- Edwin Bayntun-Sandys, born Edwin Sandys

== See also ==
- Sandys (surname)
