= Walter Sandys (died 1609) =

Member of the Parliament of England

Sir Walter Sandys (c. 1540 – 29 August 1609) was an English politician, MP for Stockbridge.

Sandys was the younger son of Thomas Sandys, 2nd Baron Sandys and his wife Elizabeth, daughter of George Manners, 11th Baron Ros.

He was educated at the Inner Temple, entering in 1555.

He married Mabel, daughter of Thomas Wriothesley, 1st Earl of Southampton. They had one son, Sir William Sandys MP.

He served as MP for Stockbridge in the Parliament of 1563–67, as a JP in Hampshire, as High Sheriff of Hampshire 1576–77 and 1591–92, and was knighted in 1591.

In the 1590s, Sandys was involved in a long dispute with his nephew William Sandys, 3rd Baron Sandys, claiming that Lord Sandys had seized by force his manor in Mottisfont. Dissatisfied with the arbitration of the case, he remonstrated personally with the Lord Chief Justice.

Sandys died on 29 August 1609 in Winchester.

Parliament of England
New constituency	Member of Parliament for Stockbridge; 1563–1567; With: William St John	Succeeded by Tristram Pistor; William St John
