= William Barne (died 1619) =

Member of the Parliament of England

Sir William Barne (c. 1558 – 9 May 1619) was an English landowner and politician from Kent.

== Origins ==
He was the eldest son of Sir George Barne (1532–1592), of Woolwich, and his wife Anne, daughter of Sir William Garrard. His father, a London merchant, had been Lord Mayor of London and an MP for the City of London.

== Life ==
As his father's heir in 1592, he became a Kent landowner and was appointed a justice of the peace for the county from 1596. Before then, he was elected to the 1593 Parliament as MP for Great Grimsby. He was knighted in 1603.

Apart from his one foray into national politics and some work for the government, he seems to have spent his life participating in county affairs and managing his lands in Woolwich, Plumstead and Bexley. He also developed literary friendships, among his correspondents being John Chamberlain, Sir Dudley Carleton and Sir Henry Savile.

== Family ==
In 1586, when he was about 24, he married Anne, daughter of Edwin Sandys, the Archbishop of York, and his wife Cecily, daughter of Sir Thomas Wilford and half-sister of Sir James Wilford. Their children included:

- Sir William (1593-1649), his heir, who married Dorothy, daughter of the MP Sir Peter Manwood.
- Robert (1596-1650), of Grimsby, who married Elizabeth, daughter of Thomas Twysden and niece of Sir William Twysden, 1st Baronet.
- Miles (1600-1651), who became a parson in Kent and married Jane, daughter of Henry Travers, a London lawyer.
- Anne (1587-1633), who married Sir William Lovelace, becoming the mother of the poet Richard Lovelace and of Francis Lovelace, Governor of New York, as well as Thomas Lovelace who later became an alderman of New York and later sheriff of Richmond county, and also of a daughter named Anne Lovelace (1610-1652) who married Rev. John Gorsuch (1600-1647).

After his death, his widow married Edward Pulter (died 1626).
