= Thomas Sandys, 2nd Baron Sandys =

Thomas Sandys, 2nd Baron Sandys, was an English peer.

The son of William Sandys, 1st Baron Sandys, Sandys succeeded his father and was summoned to Parliament in 1543.

Sandys married Elizabeth, daughter of George Manners, 11th Baron Ros. They had two sons:

- Henry Sandys, married Elizabeth, daughter of William Windsor, 2nd Baron Windsor, had three children:
  - William Sandys
  - Thomas Sandys
  - Margery Sandys
- Sir Walter Sandys MP

His older son Henry having died in his lifetime, Sandys was succeeded by his grandson William Sandys, 3rd Baron Sandys.

Peerage of England
Preceded by William Sandys	Baron Sandys; 1540–1560	Succeeded by William Sandys
