= Henry Sandys =

Henry Sandys may refer to:

- Henry Sandys (MP) (c. 1607–1640), English politician
- Henry Sandys, 5th Baron Sandys (died 1644), English nobleman and Cavalier officer
- Henry Sandys, 7th Baron Sandys

== See also ==
- Sandys (surname)
