= Samuel Sandys (disambiguation) =

Samuel Sandys, 1st Baron Sandys (1695–1770) was a British politician who served as Chancellor of the Exchequer.

Samuel Sandys may also refer to:

- Samuel Sandys (died 1623) (1560–1623), English landowner and politician
- Samuel Sandys (Royalist) (1615–1685), English politician, grandson of the above
- Samuel Sandys (died 1701) (c. 1637–1701), English politician, son of the above, grandfather of the 1st Baron Sandys

== See also ==
- Sandys (surname)
