= Sir Richard Sandys, 1st Baronet =

English baronet (b. 1670, d. 1726)

Sir Richard Sandys, 1st Baronet (6 January 1670 – 5 May 1726) was an English baronet.

Sandys was the son of Sir Richard Sandys (son of Colonel Edwin Sandys, son of Sir Edwin Sandys, second son of Edwin Sandys, Archbishop of York) and his wife Mary, daughter of Sir Henry Heyman, Bt.

He was created a baronet on 15 December 1684.

He married firstly Jane Ward, daughter of Rev. Thomas Ward, and secondly Mary Rolle, daughter of Sir Francis Rolle.

He had seven daughters, but no sons. The baronetcy therefore became extinct with his death on 5 May 1726.

Baronetage of England
New creation	Baronet (of Northborne); 1684–1726	Extinct
