= Sir Miles Sandys, 1st Baronet =

English landowner and politician

Sir Miles Sandys, 1st Baronet (29 March 1563 – 1645) was an English landowner and politician who sat in the House of Commons at various times between 1614 and 1629.

== Biography ==
Sandys was the son of Edwin Sandys, Archbishop of York and his second wife Cecily Wilford, daughter of Sir Thomas Wilford, of Cranbrook, Kent.

He was admitted to Merchant Taylors' School in April 1571, with his older brothers Samuel and Edwin (all three later became MPs). He matriculated at Peterhouse, Cambridge in 1578, graduating B.A. 1580, M.A. 1583. He gained a fellowship at Peterhouse in 1581, and at Queens' College in 1585, and was Proctor at Cambridge in 1588–89. He was a prebendary at York Minster 1585–1602.

He and his brother Edwin were both knighted by King James I on 11 May 1603 at the Charterhouse. Sir Miles was created baronet of Wilberton in Cambridgeshire on 25 November 1611. From 1615 to 1616, he was High Sheriff of Cambridgeshire and Huntingdonshire.

In 1614, Sandys was elected Member of Parliament for Cambridge University in the Addled Parliament. He was elected MP for Huntingdon in 1621, and in 1628 MP for Cambridgeshire, and sat until 1629 when King Charles I decided to rule without parliament and did so for eleven years.

His eldest son, also called Sir Miles Sandys, succeeded him on his death.

== Family ==
Sandys married firstly Elizabeth Cooke, daughter of Edward Cooke of North Cray, and they had seven sons and one daughter. He married secondly Mary West, a widow, at St Mary Aldermanbury, London on 28 November 1626.

Parliament of England
Preceded by Nicholas Steward; Henry Mountlow	Member of Parliament for Cambridge University; 1614; With: Sir Francis Bacon	Succeeded by Robert Naunton; Barnaby Gough
Preceded by Sir Christopher Hatton; Sir Miles Fleetwood	Member of Parliament for Huntingdon; 1621–1622; With: Sir Henry St John	Succeeded by Sir Arthur Mainwaring; Sir Henry St John
Preceded by Sir Edward Peyton, Bt; Sir John Cutts	Member of Parliament for Cambridgeshire; 1628–1629; With: Sir John Carleton, Bt	Vacant Parliament suspended until 1640
Baronetage of England
New creation	Baronet (of Wilberton); 1611–1645	Succeeded by Miles Sandys
