= William Sandys, 6th Baron Sandys =

William Sandys, 6th Baron Sandys (died 1668), was a Cavalier officer in the Royalist army during the English Civil War.

== Biography ==
Sandys was the eldest son of Henry Sandys, 5th Baron Sandys (Note: Due to the English Civil War Colonel Henry Sands who inherited the title of Baron Sandys on the death of his uncle in 1629 was never summoned to parliament (Burke 1846, p. 664).) and Margaret, daughter of Sir William Sandys of Miserden, Gloucestershire.

He matriculated at Balliol College, Oxford on 8 February 1639, aged 12.

During the English Civil War Sands was a colonel with a regiment in the Royalist army. As acting Governor of Worcester he successfully held the city for the Royalists during the Siege of Worcester (1643) against a Parliamentary army commanded by Sir William Waller.

In 1646 towards the First English Civil War he was governor Hartlebury Castle which, on 14 May 1646, he surrendered to the besieging force under the command of Sir Thomas Morgan.

In about 1654 the family mansion of The Vine, erected by William Sandys, 1st Baron Sandys, in the reign of Henry VIII was either sold, or it passed by forfeiture or composition, to Chaloner Chute, Member of Parliament for Middlesex in the Second Protectorate Parliament of 1656 and briefly its Speaker.

After the Restoration Sands was summoned to parliament on 8 May 1661. He died in 1668, and was succeeded by his brother Henry Sandys, 7th Baron Sandys, who was summoned to parliament on 6 March 1679.

== Family ==
Sands married Mary, daughter of William Cecil, 2nd Earl of Salisbury. They had no surviving children.

== Notes ==
Peerage of England
| Preceded by Henry Sandys | Baron Sandys; 1644–1668 | Succeeded by Henry Sandys |
