= Edwin Sandys (MP for Worcestershire) =

English politician

Edwin Sandys (1659–1699) was an English politician, MP for Worcestershire 1695–1698.

He was the eldest son of Samuel Sandys MP (a descendant of Edwin Sandys, Archbishop of York) and his wife Elizabeth Pettus, daughter of Sir John Pettus MP.

He was elected MP for Worcestershire in 1695. He did not stand in 1698, probably due to ill health.

== Family ==
On 14 October 1694 he married Alice Rushout, daughter of Sir James Rushout Bt MP. They had two sons and one daughter:

- Samuel Sandys (1695–1770), Chancellor of the Exchequer, created Baron Sandys in 1743
- Alice Sandys (born 1696), married Captain Daniel Tomkins
- Edwin Sandys (1698–1718?), "bred for the sea and died young", possibly in 1718 on board the Argyle

Parliament of England
Preceded by Sir John Pakington, Bt; Thomas Foley	Member of Parliament for Worcestershire; 1695–1698; With: Thomas Foley	Succeeded by William Walsh; Sir John Pakington, Bt
