= Samuel Sandys (Royalist) =

English politician

Sir Samuel Sandys (15 June 1615 – 5 April 1685) was an English politician who sat in the House of Commons at various times between 1640 and 1685. He fought for the Royalists in the English Civil War.

== Biography ==
Sandys was the son of Sir Edwin Sandys MP and his wife Penelope Bulkeley, daughter of Sir Richard Bulkeley MP. He was grandson of Sir Samuel Sandys MP, who had represented Worcestershire in parliament in the time of King James I.

In April 1640, Sandys was elected Member of Parliament for Droitwich in the Short Parliament. He was re-elected in November 1640 for the Long Parliament. He supported the King and was disabled from sitting in August 1642. Colonel Sandys was made governor of Evesham in 1642 and commanded a troop of horse at the action at Wickfield and at the Battle of Edgehill. Later he raised an infantry regiment and cavalry regiment for the king at his own expense. He was lieutenant-governor of Worcester under Prince Maurice in 1644.

Sandys compounded in 1646; his estates were sequestered, and he was imprisoned for a time in 1651. He was an active royalist plotter.

In 1660 Sandys was re-elected as MP for Droitwich in the Convention Parliament. In 1661 he was elected MP for Worcestershire in the Cavalier Parliament and sat until 1681. He was re-elected MP for Droitwich in 1681 and held the seat until 1685.

Sandys died on 5 April 1685 at the age of 69, and was buried at Ombersley. His monument there was designed by William bird of Oxford.

== Family ==
Sandys married firstly Mary Barker daughter of Dr Hugh Barker, and had two sons and a daughter:

- Samuel Sandys MP (died 1701), MP for Droitwich
- Edwin Sandys (died 1685), BCL and Fellow of New College, Oxford
- Mary Sandys (died 1681), unmarried, buried at Wickhamford.

His second wife was Elizabeth Pakington, daughter of Sir John Pakington Bt MP and widow of Henry Washington. They had no children.

Parliament of England
Vacant Parliament suspended since 1629	Member of Parliament for Droitwich; 1640–1642; With: John Wilde 1640; Endymion Porter 1640–1642	Succeeded by Thomas Rainsborough; Edward Wilde
Vacant Not represented in Restored Rump	Member of Parliament for Droitwich; 1660; With: Thomas Coventry	Succeeded by Samuel Sandys; Henry Coventry
Preceded by Henry Bromley; John Talbot	Member of Parliament for Worcestershire; 1661–1681; With: Sir John Pakington, Bt 1661–1679; Thomas Foley 1679–1681	Succeeded by Thomas Foley; Bridges Nanfan
Preceded by Samuel Sandys; Henry Coventry	Member of Parliament for Droitwich; 1681–1685; With: Henry Coventry	Succeeded by Samuel Sandys; Thomas Windsor
