= Samuel Sandys (died 1623) =

English landowner and politician

Sir Samuel Sandys (28 December 1560 – 18 August 1623) was an English landowner and politician who sat in the House of Commons at various times between 1586 and 1622.

== Biography ==
Sandys was the eldest surviving son of Edwin Sandys, Archbishop of York, by his second wife Cecily Wilford.

He was admitted to Merchant Taylors' School in April 1571, with his younger brothers Edwin and Miles (all three later became MPs). He entered the Middle Temple in 1579.

He acquired the lease of the royal manor of Ombersley, Worcestershire in 1582. He was elected Member of Parliament for Ripon in 1586, and succeeded to the property of his father in 1588. Although he initially lived in Essex, where his mother held land – his eldest son was baptised at Woodham Ferrers in 1591 – he settled at Ombersley thereafter, purchased the manor of Wickhamford, Worcestershire in 1594, and purchased the manor of Ombersley from the Crown for £2,000 in 1614.

He was a JP for Worcestershire from 1597, and was knighted by King James I at Whitehall on 23 July 1603.

He was elected MP for Worcestershire in a by-election in 1609, re-elected in 1614 and 1621. By 1621, John Chamberlain numbered Sandys among the four chief speakers in the Commons. He often spoke in debates on electoral disputes, and raised matters of parliamentary procedure.

In the Commons, Sandys often worked with his brother Sir Edwin Sandys, especially on colonial matters and international trade. Sir Samuel was a prominent member of the Virginia Company, of which Sir Edwin was treasurer, and its spin-off, the Somers Isles Company. A member of the Virginia committee from 1612, Sir Samuel was interested in the tobacco trade, the mainstay of Virginia's economy.

He was High Sheriff of Worcestershire 1618–1619, and a member of the council in the marches of Wales in 1623.

Sandys died on 18 August 1623, at the age of 62, and was buried at Wickhamford, Worcestershire. His eldest son and heir, Sir Edwin Sandys, died three weeks later. Father and son, and their wives, are cast in alabaster effigy in their funerary monument in Wickhamford church.

== Family ==
Sandys married Mercy Culpepper (daughter of Martin Culpepper) at Southwell, Nottinghamshire in 1586. They had four sons and seven daughters:

- Sir Edwin Sandys MP
- Martin Sandys
- John Sandys
- William Sandys
- Cecily Sandys, married John Brace MP
- Margaret Sandys, married Sir Francis Wyatt, Governor of Virginia
- Anne Sandys, married Sir Francis Wenman MP
- Mary Sandys, married Richard Humphrey
- Mercy Sandys, married Mr. Ewbank
- Joyce Sandys, married Edward Dyneley, Lord of Charlton Manor, Worcestershire.
- Elizabeth Sandys,^{A} married Edward Pytts MP

== Note ==
^A Collins states wrongly that Elizabeth married secondly George Walsh. Elsewhere Collins states correctly that it was Elizabeth's daughter Mercy Pytts, married firstly Henry Bromley MP, who married secondly George Walsh MP.

Parliament of England
| Preceded by William Spencer; Gervase Lee | Member of Parliament for Ripon; 1586; With: William Spencer | Succeeded by Peter York; William Smith |
| Preceded by Sir Henry Bromley; Sir William Lygon | Member of Parliament for Worcestershire; 1609–1622; With: Sir Henry Bromley 1609–1611; Sir Thomas Lyttelton 1614–1622 | Succeeded by Sir Thomas Lyttelton; Sir Walter Devereux |
