= Edwin Sandys (died 1623) =

English politician

Sir Edwin Sandys (1591 – 6 September 1623) was an English politician who sat in the House of Commons between 1614 and 1622.

Sandys was the eldest son of Sir Samuel Sandys MP, and the grandson of Edwin Sandys, Archbishop of York. He was baptised at Woodham Ferrers, Essex on 28 March 1591.

He matriculated at Corpus Christi College, Oxford on 13 November 1609 aged 18. He entered the Middle Temple in 1610.

In 1614, Sandys was elected Member of Parliament for Droitwich. He was knighted at York on 12 April 1617. In 1621 he was elected MP for Pontefract.

Sandys died in September 1623, three weeks after his father. Father and son, and their wives, are cast in alabaster effigy in their funerary monument in Wickhamford church, Worcestershire.

== Family ==
In 1614, Sandys married Penelope Bulkeley, daughter of Sir Richard Bulkeley MP of Baron Hill, Anglesey. They had four sons and three daughters:

- Sir Samuel Sandys MP (1615–1685)
- Richard Sandys (1616–1642), killed at the Battle of Edgehill, 23 October 1642
- Edwin Sandys (born 1617)
- Catharine Sandys, married Stephen Anderson of Eyworth, Bedfordshire
- Mercy Sandys
- another daughter, died young
- Martin Sandys (born 1624), born after his father's death

Parliament of England
| Preceded by George Wylde I John Brace | Member of Parliament for Droitwich; 1614; With: Ralph Clare | Succeeded by Thomas Coventry; John Wilde |
| New constituency | Member of Parliament for Pontefract; 1621–1622; With: George Shellitoe | Succeeded by Sir John Jackson; Sir Thomas Wentworth |
