= Edwin Sandys, 2nd Baron Sandys =

British politician (1726–1797)

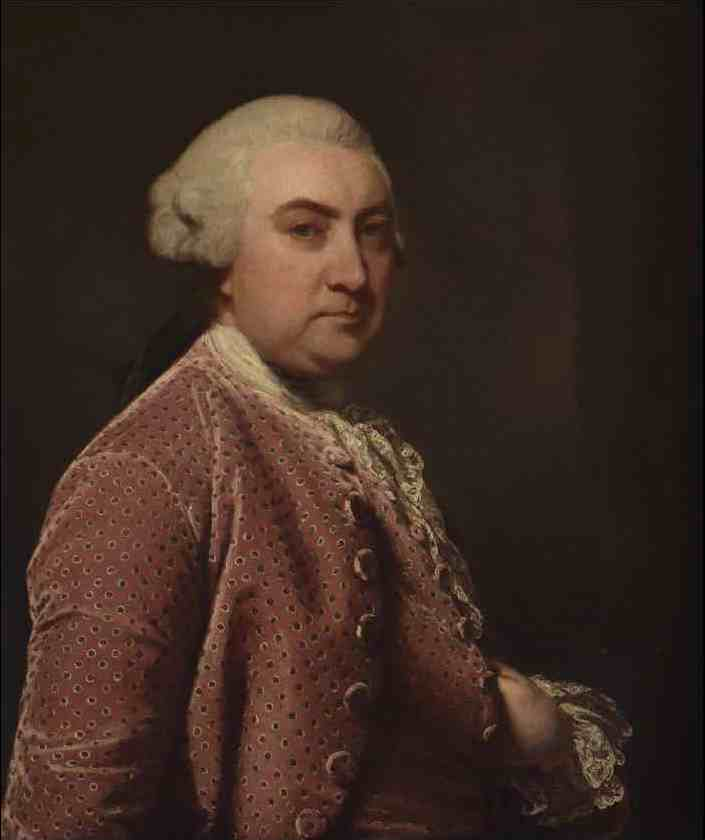
Edwin, 2nd Baron Sandys by Joshua Reynolds

Edwin Sandys, 2nd Baron Sandys (28 April 1726 – 11 March 1797), was a British politician.

He was the eldest son of Samuel Sandys, 1st Baron Sandys, and his wife Letitia, daughter of Sir Thomas Tipping, Bt.

He was educated at New College, Oxford, matriculating in 1743. He did not graduate, but was awarded a DCL in 1756.

He served as Member of Parliament for Droitwich from 1747 to 1754, for Bossiney from 1754 to 1762 and for Westminster from 1762 to 1770. He was a Lord of the Admiralty from April to July, 1757.

On 26 January 1769 Sandys married Anna Maria King, daughter of James Colebrooke and widow of William Paine King.

On his father's death in 1770, he succeeded to the barony as the 2nd Baron Sandys, and to estates in Ombersley (including Ombersley Court) and elsewhere.

He and his wife had no issue, so his title became extinct on his death, but his estates passed to his niece Mary, Marchioness of Downshire, who was in 1802 created Baroness Sandys with special remainder to her younger sons, before the eldest.

Parliament of Great Britain
| Preceded by Thomas Foley; Lord George Bentinck | Member of Parliament for Droitwich; 1747–1754; With: Francis Winnington | Succeeded by Thomas Foley; Robert Harley |
| Preceded by William Ord; William Montagu | Member of Parliament for Bossiney; 1754–1762; With: Edward Wortley Montagu | Succeeded by Edward Wortley Montagu; John Richmond Webb |
| Preceded by Viscount Pulteney; Hon. Edward Cornwallis | Member of Parliament for Westminster; 1762–1770; With: Viscount Pulteney 1762–1763; Earl Percy 1763–1770 | Succeeded by Earl Percy; Sir Robert Bernard, Bt |
Peerage of Great Britain
| Preceded by Samuel Sandys | Baron Sandys; 1770–1797 | Extinct |
