= Samuel Sandys (died 1701) =

English politician

Samuel Sandys (c. 1637 – 4 August 1701) was an English politician, MP for Droitwich in five Parliaments.

The son of Sir Samuel Sandys MP, he succeeded his father as MP for Droitwich in 1661, when his father became MP for the county. His father became MP for Droitwich again in 1681; the son succeeded him again in 1685. Sandys was re-elected in 1689, and stood for the county in 1690, but withdrew when he appeared likely to win.

Sandys died on 4 August 1701, aged 64, and was buried at Ombersley.

== Family ==
On 7 February 1655, Sandys married Elizabeth Pettus, daughter of Sir John Pettus MP. They had three sons and four daughters:

- Edwin Sandys MP (1659–1699)
- Henry Sandys (died young)
- Martin Sandys (1672–1753), Fellow of New College, Oxford, barrister, Town Clerk of Worcester
- Elizabeth Sandys (died young)
- Penelope Sandys, married Henry Townshend
- Mary Sandys (died 14 January 1729), married Price Devereux, 9th Viscount Hereford
- Frances Sandys, married Samuel Pytts MP

Parliament of England
Preceded by Sir Samuel Sandys; Thomas Coventry	Member of Parliament for Droitwich; 1661–1681; With: Henry Coventry	Succeeded by Sir Samuel Sandys; Henry Coventry
Preceded by Sir Samuel Sandys; Henry Coventry	Member of Parliament for Droitwich; 1685–1690; With: Thomas Windsor; The Lord Coote	Succeeded by Philip Foley; The Lord Coote
