= Mary Hill, Marchioness of Downshire =

British peeress

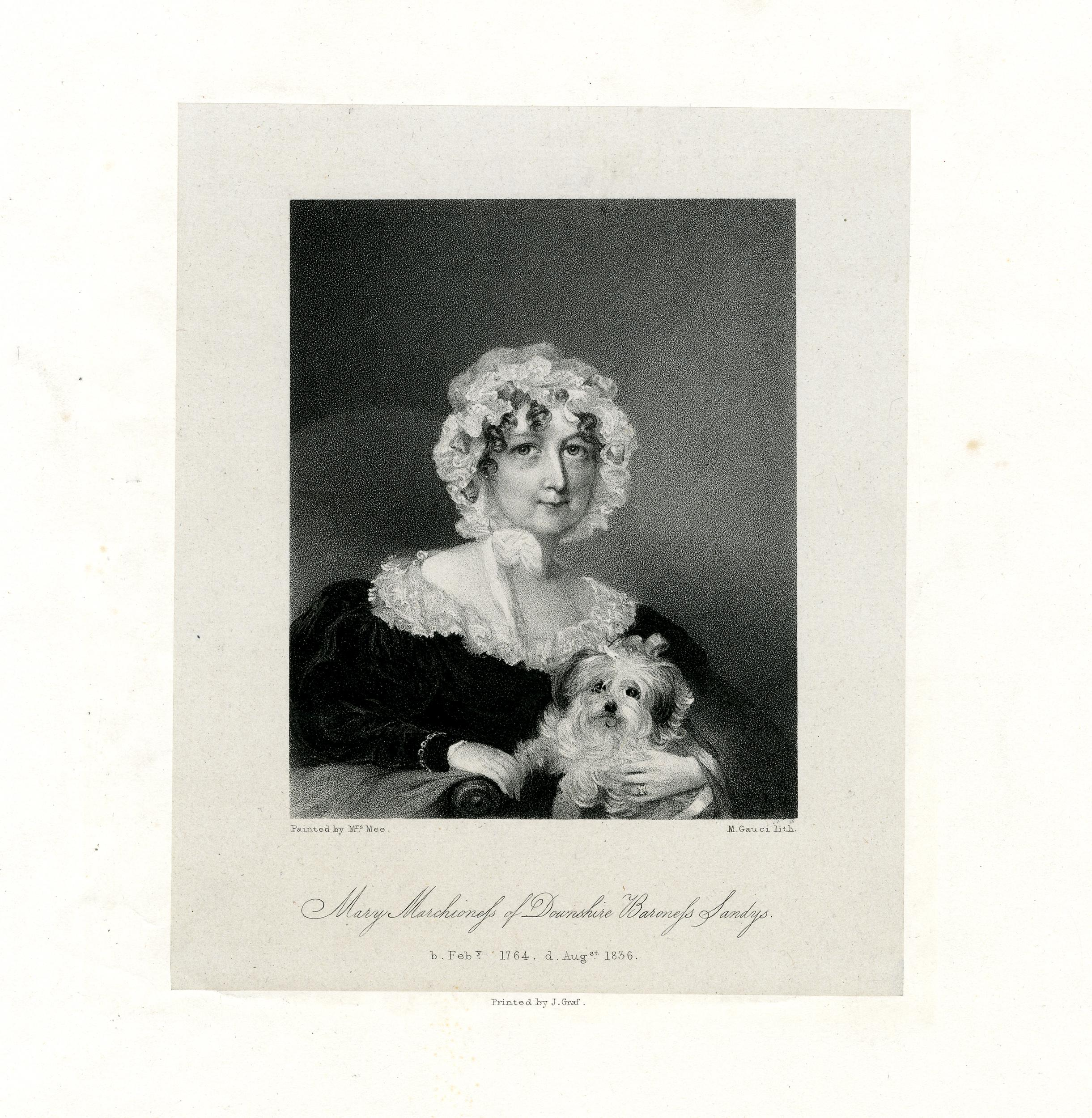
Mary Hill, Marchioness of Downshire

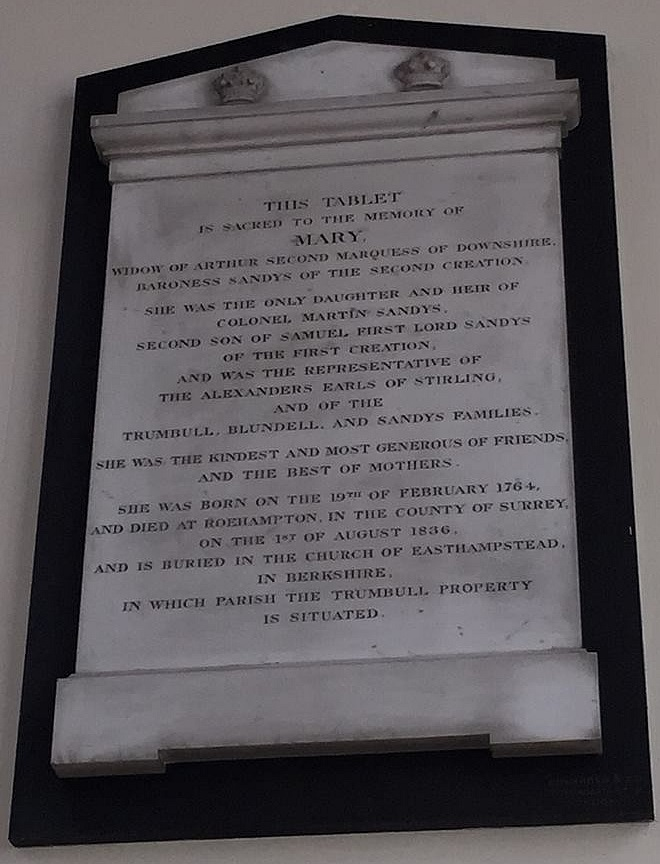
Memorial in Ombersley Church

Mary Hill, Marchioness of Downshire and suo jure 1st Baroness Sandys (19 February 1764 – 1 August 1836), was a British peeress.

She was born Mary Sandys, daughter of Colonel Martin Sandys (fourth son of Samuel Sandys, 1st Baron Sandys) and his wife Mary Trumbull (only child and heiress of William Trumbull, son of Sir William Trumbull).

On 29 June 1786, she married Arthur Hill, Viscount Fairford (who succeeded as 2nd Marquess of Downshire in 1793). They had seven children:

- Arthur Blundell Sandys Trumbull Hill, 3rd Marquess of Downshire (1788–1845)
- Lt.-Gen. Arthur Moyses William Hill, 2nd Baron Sandys (1792–1860)
- Lady Charlotte Hill (1794–1821)
- Lady Mary Hill (1796–1830)
- Arthur Marcus Cecil Sandys, 3rd Baron Sandys (1798–1863)
- Lord Arthur Augustus Edwin Hill (1800–1831)
- Major Lord George Augusta Hill (1801–1879)

The last son, Lord George Hill, was born on 9 December 1801, three months after his father the Marquess of Downshire had died by suicide, on 7 September. Downshire, a vehement opponent of Union with Ireland, had been stripped of his local dignities by the government. The Marchioness became a bitter political opponent to Lord Castlereagh.

She was the heiress of her uncle, Edwin Sandys, 2nd Baron Sandys, and to the estates of her grandfather, William Trumbull, including Easthampstead Park. On 19 June 1802, she was created Baroness Sandys, with a special remainder to her second, third, fourth and fifth sons respectively, and finally to her eldest son, who had succeeded his father as Marquess of Downshire.

Peerage of the United Kingdom
New creation	Baron Sandys; 3rd creation 1802–1836	Succeeded by Arthur Hill
