= William Sandys, 3rd Baron Sandys =

English landowner

William Sandys, 3rd Baron Sandys (died 1623) was an English landowner.

He was the son of Henry Sandys and Elizabeth Windsor. His family home was The Vyne, where he hosted Queen Elizabeth in September 1569.

Sandys took part in the trials of the Duke of Norfolk in 1572 and Mary, Queen of Scots in 1586.

In 1573 he married Katherine Brydges (1554-1596), a daughter of Edmund Brydges, 2nd Baron Chandos and Dorothy Bray. Katherine Brydges had been a maid of honour to Queen Elizabeth. She appears as "fair Brydges" in George Gascoigne's poem Hundreth Sundrie Flowers (1573), and in a poem by George Whetstone apparently celebrating Mary Hopton, the wife of her brother William Brydges, 4th Baron Chandos. They had a daughter, Elizabeth.

Sandys married secondly Christian Annesley, a daughter of Brian Annesley and Audrey Tyrrell. She was a sister of the maid of honour Cordell Annesley (d. 1636). They had a son, William.

Sandys was arrested as a follower of the rebel Earl of Essex in 1601. His properties were confiscated and he was fined £5000. Christian, Lady Sandys wrote several letters to Sir Robert Cecil asking for help and forgiveness. She heard from Lady Kildare that Queen Elizabeth had read another of her letters.

Sandys was briefly held in the Tower of London and at Edward Hungerford's house near Bath. He was released and pardoned.

In September 1601 he helped host the French ambassador, the Duc de Biron, during his visit to Basing House. According to John Stow, the furnishings at The Vyne were augmented with silver plate, tapestry, and beds from the royal wardrobe at the Tower and Hampton Court. Elizabeth came to the Vyne and delayed saluting the Duke to make a point in etiquette, then after he had ridden behind her a while she took off her riding mask and acknowledged him. Biron said the queen and as many as 50 ladies rode to the hunt at the Vyne.

His third wife was Anne Baker, daughter of Sir Richard Baker and Katherine Tyrrell.

Peerage of England
Preceded by Thomas Sandys	Baron Sandys; 1560–1623	Succeeded by William Sandys
