= Francis Lovelace =

Royalist, early proprietary governor of NY, US (1621–1675)

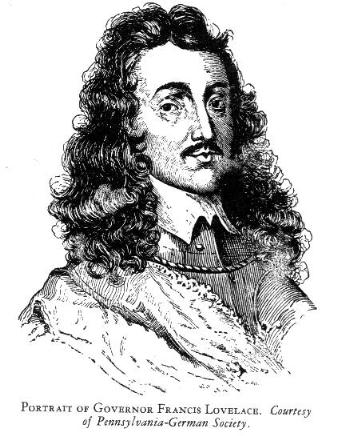

2nd Colonial Governor of New York
- In office 1668–1673
- Monarch: Charles II
- Preceded by: Richard Nicolls
- Succeeded by: Anthony Colve

Personal details
- Born: circa 1621 Kent, England
- Died: 1675 England
- Party: Royalist
- Spouse: Blanche Talbot (m. 1659)
- Relations: Richard Lovelace (brother)
- Parent(s): Sir William Lovelace; Anne Barne

Francis Lovelace (c. 1621–1675) was an English Royalist and the second Governor of New York colony.

== Early life ==
Lovelace was born circa 1621. He was the third son of Sir William Lovelace (1584–1627) and his wife Anne Barne of Lovelace Place, Bethersden and Woolwich, Kent. He was the younger brother of Richard Lovelace, the Cavalier poet. The Bethersden Lovelace lineage was founded in 1367 by John Lovelace, six generations before Francis, and has been confused over the years with the Hurley Lovelaces who were raised to the House of Lords.

== Career ==
The five Lovelace brothers supported Charles I in the English Civil War. Francis was a Colonel in the Royalist army and was governor of Carmarthen Castle in Wales from June 1644 until it was surrendered to Parliamentary troops in October 1645 after a fierce battle in which his brother, William, was killed. He and another brother, Dudley, migrated to Europe and served with the French army later in the 1640s. The brothers later supported Charles II, and spent time in exile like him, in his fight to be restored to the throne.

Lovelace lived in Virginia where his sister, Anne Gorsuch, had migrated after marriage, from 1650 until after the colony was seized by the English Parliamentary commissioners in 1652 when the governor, Sir William Berkeley, dispatched him to France to inform Charles II. Though he is referred to in the administration entry as a bachelor, he is known to have married one Blanche Talbot secretly at the age of 38 and was "later forced or persuaded to leave his wife". He returned to England in 1658, the year of Oliver Cromwell's death. In 1659, he was arrested and confined in the Tower of London until after the fall of the Parliamentary government and the restoration of Charles II in 1660.

Charles gave his brother, the Duke of York (later to become King James II), rights to the colony of Nieuw Amsterdam when Richard Nicolls took it from the Dutch in 1667. Many English colonists did not like Nicolls because they thought Oliver Cromwell had been their savior.

=== Governor of New York ===
The Duke of York appointed Lovelace the second governor of the New York Colony in 1668 after the departure of Richard Nicolls. While in office he purchased Staten Island from the local Native Americans, among whom he sent Church of England missionaries, granted 'freedom of conscience' to the English, Dutch and Swedish populations of the colony, organised infantry and militia companies and expanded New York City's defences. His efforts at pacifying the former Dutch and Swedish settlers contributed to the Revolt of the Long Swede from gaining any traction.

During his time in New York, he ran and operated the King's House tavern (also known as Lovelace Tavern) in lower Manhattan. The tavern was built in 1670 in the Stadt Huys Block and rediscovered by archeologists in 1979–1980.

Despite his defensive preparations, his administration was terminated by the temporary recapture of the colony by the Dutch in 1673 when, for a brief period the Dutch Admiral Cornelis Evertsen the youngest seized New York City, to little opposition, and re-established Nieuw Amsterdam. At the time of the invasion, Lovelace was out of the colony, meeting with the Governor of Connecticut, John Winthrop Jr. in Hartford, Connecticut, in the course of planning the first postal system from New York to Boston. From 1673 to 1674, Dutch marine Captain Anthony Colve acted as military governor-general until England recovered the colony under the terms of the Treaty of Westminster in 1674.

=== Return to England ===
Lovelace, whose property in New York had been confiscated by the Dutch, was sent home in disgrace to England. The Duke of York, blaming Lovelace for the loss of his namesake colony, confiscated his plantation on Staten Island and his English estates for a £7,000 debt. In January 1675 he was committed to the Tower of London, where he was interrogated by commissioners. His answers were deemed unacceptable, but no further proceedings were brought against him. He contracted dropsy and, because of his health, was released in April. He went to live at Woodstock, Oxfordshire and died, in penury, by 22 December 1675 when administration of his estate was granted to his brother Dudley.

The third new Governor of New York after Francis Lovelace was John Lovelace, 4th Baron Lovelace of Hurley – no kin to Francis of the Bethersden Lovelaces. Early genealogists confused Francis with an identically named son of Richard Lovelace, 1st Baron Lovelace of Hurley, due to a pamphlet issued at the time of his appointment mistakenly asserting that he was the brother of the said Richard. The confusion has also spread to more modern historians.

Government offices
| Preceded by Richard Nicolls | Proprietary Governor of the Province of New York; 1668–1672 | Succeeded by Anthony Colve as Director-General of New Netherland |
