= Henry Sandys (MP) =

English politician

Henry Sandys (c. 1607 – July 1640) was an English politician, MP for Mitchell in 1625.

He was the eldest son of Sir Edwin Sandys MP, a founding member and Treasurer of the Virginia Company, and his fourth wife Catherine Bulkeley, daughter of Sir Richard Bulkeley.

Sandys was educated at Wadham College, Oxford, matriculating in 1621 and graduating B.A. in 1624. He entered Gray's Inn as a student in 1627.

He married Margaret Hammond, daughter of Sir William Hammond.

Sandys was elected MP for Mitchell in the Useless Parliament of 1625. The Parliament was dissolved by King Charles I after sitting for less than three months.

He did not stand for election again. His father Sir Edwin died in 1629, leaving him considerable debts, and shares in the Virginia Company (which had failed in 1624). Henry Sandys borrowed further; by his death he owed his creditors more than £8,000.

His will was proved on 28 July 1640.

Parliament of England
Preceded by Denzil Holes; John Sawle	Member of Parliament for Mitchell; 1625; With: Sir John Smith	Succeeded by Francis Crossing; Sir John Smith
