= Baron Sandys =

Barony in the Peerage of Great Britain

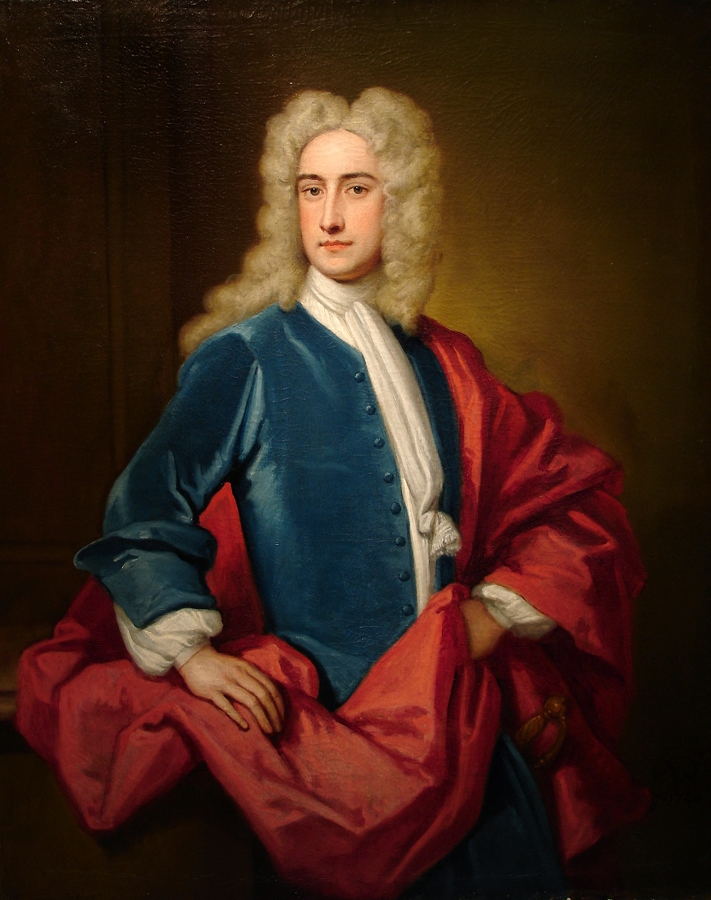
Samuel Sandys, 1st Baron Sandys (1695–1770)

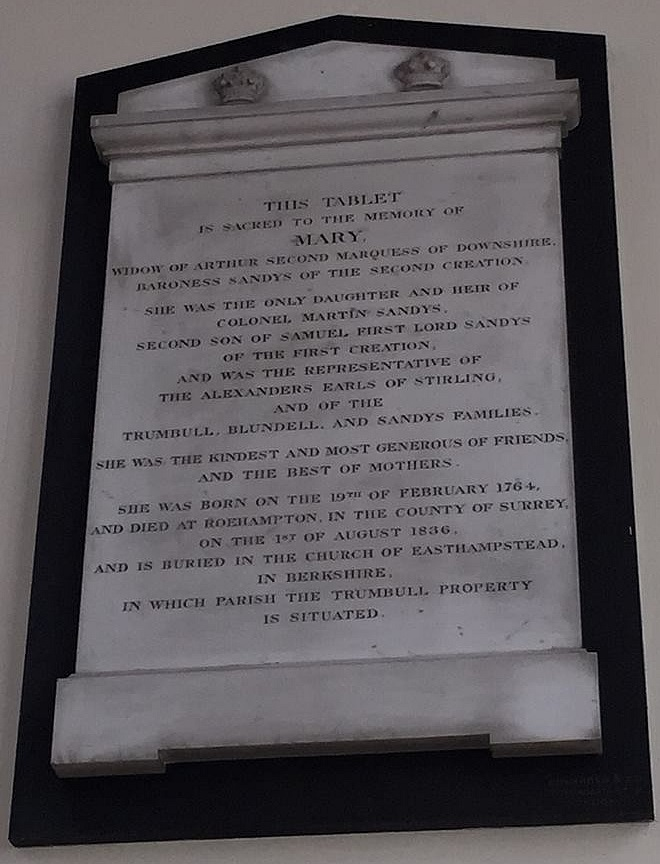
Ombersley Church, memorial to Mary Hill, Marchioness of Downshire, Baroness Sandys (1774–1836)

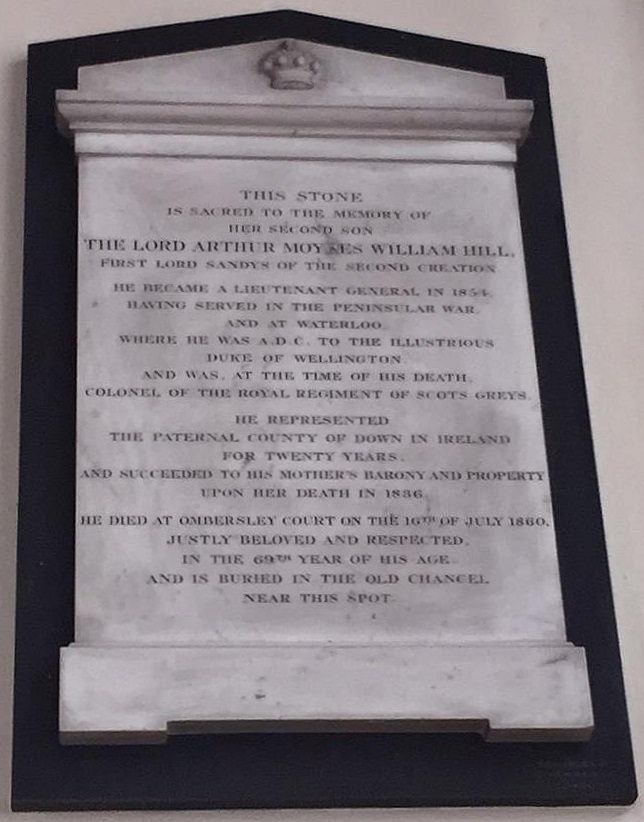
Ombersley Church, memorial to Arthur, Lord Sandys (1793–1860)

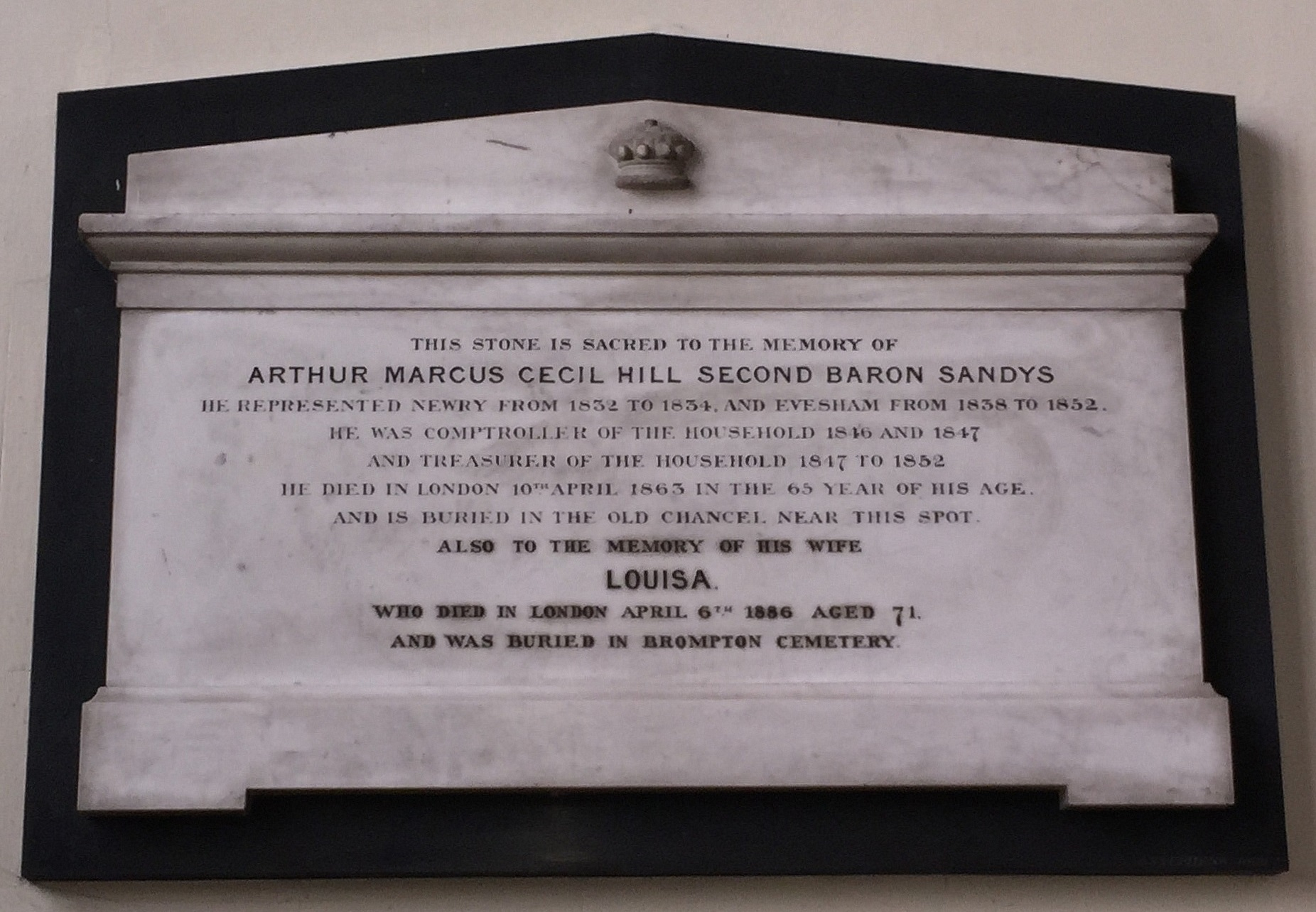
Ombersley Church, memorial to Arthur Marcus, Lord Sandys (1798–1863)

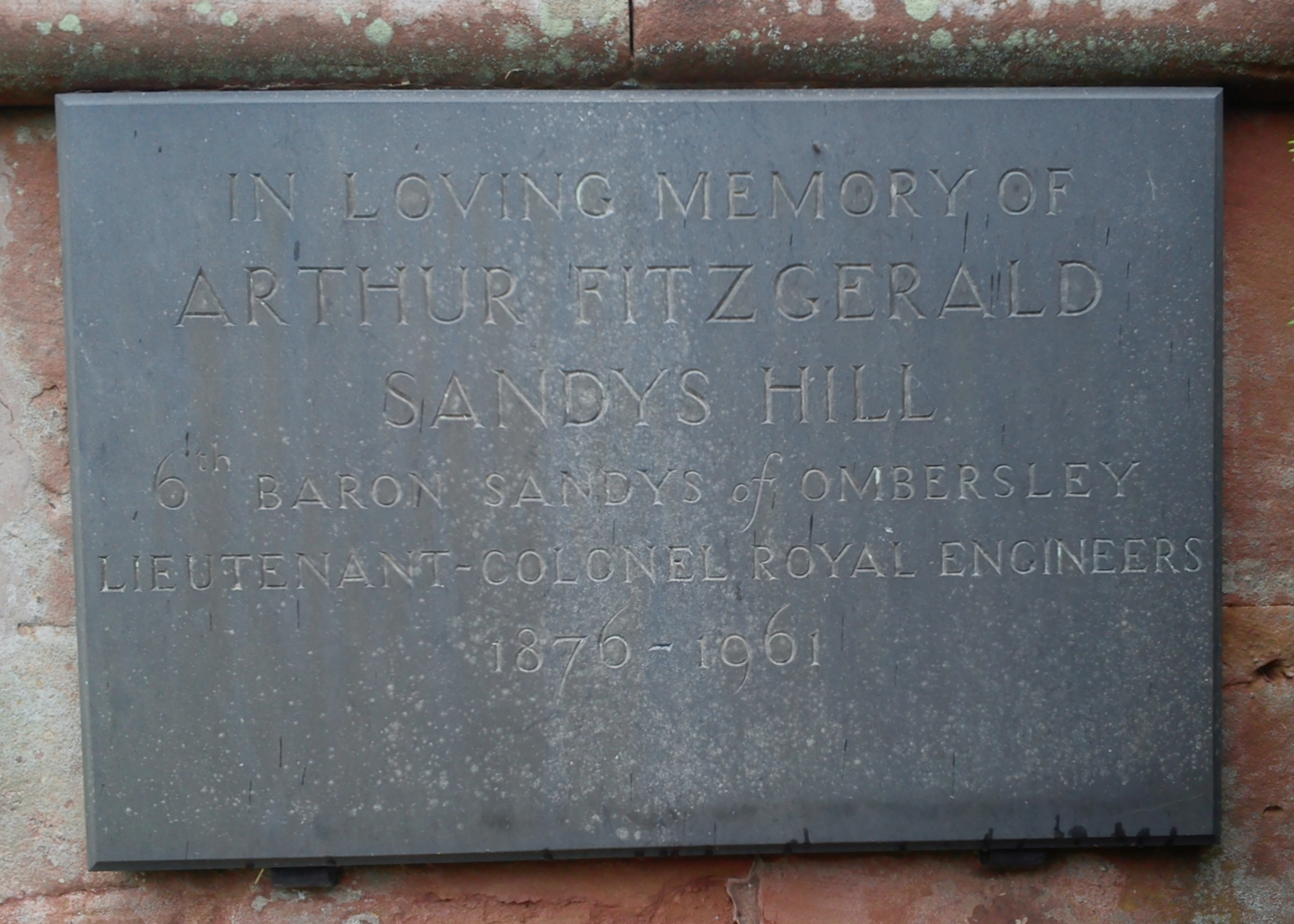
Ombersley Mausoleum, memorial to Arthur Sandys Hill, 6th Baron Sandys (1876–1961)

Baron Sandys (/sændz/) is a title that has been created three times, once in the Peerage of England, once in the Peerage of Great Britain and once in the Peerage of the United Kingdom.

The first creation, as Baron Sandys, of The Vyne, in Hampshire, was in the Peerage of England in 1523 for William Sandys, the favourite of King Henry VIII. It passed through several generations of his descendants until it fell into abeyance circa 1683 at the death of the eighth Baron, in which state it has remained since.

The second creation, as Baron Sandys, of Ombersley in the County of Worcester, was in the Peerage of Great Britain in 1743 for Samuel Sandys, the former Chancellor of the Exchequer. This title became extinct on the death of his son Edwin, the second Baron, in 1797. The family estates were inherited by Edwin's niece Mary Hill, Marchioness of Downshire, widow of Arthur Hill, 2nd Marquess of Downshire.

The third creation, again as Baron Sandys, of Ombersley in the County of Worcester, was in the Peerage of the United Kingdom in 1802 for Mary Hill, Marchioness of Downshire, widow of Arthur Hill, 2nd Marquess of Downshire.

The barony was created with remainder to her younger sons Lord Arthur Moyses William Hill, Lord Marcus Hill, Lord Augustus Hill and Lord George Hill successively, and failing them to her eldest son Arthur Blundell Hill, 3rd Marquess of Downshire.

She was succeeded according to the special remainder by her second son Lord Arthur Moyses William, the second Baron. He was a Lieutenant-General in the Army and also represented County Down in the House of Commons. He never married and was succeeded by his next brother, the third Baron. He sat as Member of Parliament for Newry and Evesham. In 1861 Lord Sandys assumed by Royal licence the surname of Sandys in lieu of Hill. This line of the family failed on the death of his younger son, the fifth Baron, in 1904. The late Baron was succeeded by his second cousin once removed, the sixth Baron. He was the grandson of Lord George Hill, the fifth son of the first Baroness.

The sixth baron's son, the seventh Baron, succeeded in 1961. Lord Sandys notably served as Captain of the Yeomen of the Guard between 1979 and 1983 in the Conservative administration of Margaret Thatcher. However, he lost his seat in the House of Lords after the passing of the House of Lords Act 1999. He died on 11 February 2013 and was succeeded in the peerage, under the terms of the special remainder, by the ninth Marquess of Downshire.

The family seat is Ombersley Court in Ombersley near Droitwich in Worcestershire. The house has been up for sale since the death of the previous Lord Sandys. The traditional burial place of the family is the Sandys Mausoleum in the churchyard of St Andrew, Ombersley. When St Andrew's Church was built in its current form between 1825 and 1829, the chancel of the old church was adapted for use as a mausoleum for the Sandys family, who were lords of the manor.

== Barons Sandys, of The Vyne, in Hampshire, first creation (1523) ==
- William Sandys, 1st Baron Sandys (c. 1470–1540) – first summoned to parliament 3 November 1529.
- Thomas Sandys, 2nd Baron Sandys (d. 1560) — first summoned to parliament 14 June 1543,
- William Sandys, 3rd Baron Sandys (d. 1623) — first summoned to parliament 8 May 1572.
- William Sandys, 4th Baron Sandys (d. 1629) — never summoned to parliament.
- Henry Sandys, 5th Baron Sandys (d. 1644) — because of the English Civil War never summoned to parliament.
- William Sandys, 6th Baron Sandys (c. 1626–1668) — first summoned to parliament 8 May 1661.
- Henry Sandys, 7th Baron Sandys (d. c. 1680) — first summoned to parliament 6 March 1679.
- Edwin Sandys, 8th Baron Sandys (d. before 1700) — never summoned to parliament.

== Barons Sandys, second creation (1743) ==
- Samuel Sandys, 1st Baron Sandys (1695–1770)
- Edwin Sandys, 2nd Baron Sandys (1726–1797)

== Barons Sandys, third creation (1802) ==
- Mary Hill, Marchioness of Downshire, 1st Baroness Sandys (1764–1836)
- Arthur Moyses William Hill, 2nd Baron Sandys (1793–1860)
- (Arthur) Marcus Cecil Sandys, 3rd Baron Sandys (1798–1863)
- Augustus Frederick Arthur Sandys, 4th Baron Sandys (1840–1904)
- Michael Edwin Marcus Sandys, 5th Baron Sandys (1855–1948)
- Arthur Fitzgerald Sandys Hill, 6th Baron Sandys (1876–1961)
- Richard Michael Oliver Hill, 7th Baron Sandys (1931–2013)
- Arthur Francis Nicholas Wills Hill, 8th Baron Sandys, 9th Marquess of Downshire (b. 1959)

== Family tree ==
Family tree of the Marquesses of Downshire, Earls of Hillsborough, and the Barons Sandys

Michael Hill (1672–1699)	See also: Archbishop Sandys family tree
Viscount Hillsborough and Baron Hill of Kilwarlin, 1717	Viscount Dungannon (2nd creation) and Baron Hill of Olderfleet, 1766	Baron Sandys of Ombersley in the County of Worcester (2nd creation), 1743
Trevor Hill (1693–1742); 1st Viscount Hillsborough and Baron Hill of Kilwarlin	Arthur Hill-Trevor (1694–1771); 1st Viscount Dungannon and Baron Hill of Olderfleet	Samuel Sandys (1695–1770); 1st Baron Sandys
Earl of Hillsborough (Ireland) and Viscount Kilwarlin, 1751; Baron Harwich, 1756; Marquess of Downshire, Earl of Hillsborough (Great Britain) and Viscount Fairford, 1789
Wills Hill (1718–1793); 1st Marquess of Downshire, Earl of Hillsborough (Ire & GB), Viscount Kilwarlin, Viscount Fairford, and Baron Harwich, 2nd Viscount Hillsborough and Baron Hill of Kilwarlin	Edwin Sandys (1726–1797); 2nd Baron Sandys	Martin Sandys (1729–1768)
Barony Sandys (2nd creation) extinct, 1797
Baron Sandys of Ombersley in the County of Worcester (3rd creation), 1802
Arthur Hill (1753–1801); 2nd Marquess of Downshire, Earl of Hillsborough (Ire & GB), Viscount Kilwarlin, Viscount Fairford, and Baron Harwich, 3rd Viscount Hillsborough and Baron Hill of Kilwarlin	Mary Hill (1764–1836); 1st Baroness Sandys
Arthur Blundell Sandys Trumbull Hill (1788–1845); 3rd Marquess of Downshire, Earl of Hillsborough (Ire & GB), Viscount Kilwarlin, Viscount Fairford, and Baron Harwich, 4th Viscount Hillsborough and Baron Hill of Kilwarlin	Arthur Moyses William Hill (1792–1860); 2nd Baron Sandys	Arthur Marcus Cecil (Hill) Sandys (1798–1863); 3rd Baron Sandys	George Augusta Hill (1801–1879)
Arthur Wills Blundell Sandys Trumbull Windsor Hill (1812–1868); 4th Marquess of Downshire, Earl of Hillsborough (Ire & GB), Viscount Kilwarlin, Viscount Fairford, and Baron Harwich, 5th Viscount Hillsborough and Baron Hill of Kilwarlin
Arthur Wills Blundell Trumbull Sandys Roden Hill (1844–1874); 5th Marquess of Downshire, Earl of Hillsborough (Ire & GB), Viscount Kilwarlin, Viscount Fairford, and Baron Harwich, 6th Viscount Hillsborough and Baron Hill of Kilwarlin	Augustus Frederick Arthur (Hill) Sandys (1840–1904); 4th Baron Sandys	Michael Edwin Marcus (Hill) Sandys (1855–1948); 5th Baron Sandys	Arthur Sandys Hill (1837–1923)
Arthur Wills John Wellington Trumbull Blundell Hill (1871–1918); 6th Marquess of Downshire, Earl of Hillsborough (Ire & GB), Viscount Kilwarlin, Viscount Fairford, and Baron Harwich, 7th Viscount Hillsborough and Baron Hill of Kilwarlin	Arthur Fitzgerald Sandys Hill (1876–1961); 6th Baron Sandys
Arthur Wills Percy Wellington Blundell Trumbull Hill (1894–1989); 7th Marquess of Downshire, Earl of Hillsborough (Ire & GB), Viscount Kilwarlin, Viscount Fairford, and Baron Harwich, 8th Viscount Hillsborough and Baron Hill of Kilwarlin	Lord Arthur Francis Hill (1895–1953)
Arthur "Robin" Ian Hill (1929–2003); 8th Marquess of Downshire, Earl of Hillsborough (Ire & GB), Viscount Kilwarlin, Viscount Fairford, and Baron Harwich, 9th Viscount Hillsborough and Baron Hill of Kilwarlin	Richard Hill (1931–2013); 7th Baron Sandys
Arthur Francis "Nicholas" Wills Hill (b. 1959); 9th Marquess of Downshire, Earl of Hillsborough (Ire & GB), Viscount Kilwarlin, Viscount Fairford, and Baron Harwich, 10th Viscount Hillsborough and Baron Hill of Kilwarlin, 8th Baron Sandys
Edmund Robin Arthur Hill (b. 1996) styled Earl of Hillsborough
Heir apparent to the Marquessate of Downshire and the Barony of Sandys

== See also ==
- Marquess of Downshire
- Baron Trevor
