= 1642 in literature =

This article contains information about the literary events and publications of 1642.

== Events ==
- May – The 35-year-old John Milton marries the teenage Mary Powell. A few weeks later she leaves him in London and returns to her family in Oxfordshire.
- May/June – English Cavalier poet Richard Lovelace is incarcerated in the Gatehouse Prison, Westminster for defying Parliament. During his time there he may be writing "To Althea, from Prison".
- September 2 – London theatre closure 1642: The theatres in London are closed by order of the Puritan Long Parliament; the "lascivious mirth and levity" of stage plays are to "cease and be forborn" for the next 18 years, during the English Civil War and the Interregnum. Richard Brome's A Jovial Crew is reportedly staged on the final day, making it the last to be legitimately performed in the era of English Renaissance theatre.

== New books ==
=== Prose ===
- Thomas Browne – Religio Medici
- Gauthier de Costes, seigneur de la Calprenède – Cassandre
- Thomas Fuller – The Holy State and the Profane State
- Pieter Corneliszoon Hooft – Nederduytsche Historiën (History of the Netherlands, publication begins)
- Sir Walter Ralegh – The Prince, or Maxims of State
- Alonso de Castillo Solórzano – La garduña de Sevilla y anzuelo de las bolsas
- Tohfatu'l-Ahbab, a Persian-language work by Muhammad Ali Kashmiri

=== Drama ===
- Antonio Coello – Los empeños de seis horas (approximate date)
- Pierre Corneille – Polyeucte
- François le Métel de Boisrobert – La Belle Palène
- Donaires del gusto
- Pierre du Ryer – Saul
- Francis Jaques – The Queen of Corsica
- James Shirley – The Sisters
- Jan Vos – Klucht van Oene (The Farce of Oene)

=== Poetry ===
- John Denham – Cooper's Hill, the first example in English of a poem devoted to local description, in this case the Thames scenery around the author's home at Egham in Surrey
- Richard Lovelace – "To Althea, from Prison"
- Alonso de Castillo Solórzano – Academias morales de las musas

== Births ==
- March 15 (baptised) – Laurence Hyde, 1st Earl of Rochester, English politician and writer (died 1711)
- April 21 – Simon de la Loubère, French diplomat, writer, mathematician and poet (died 1729)
- April 30 – Christian Weise, German dramatist and poet (died 1708)
- December 30 – Vincenzo da Filicaja, Florentine poet (died 1707)
- Unknown dates
  - Abdul-Qādir Bīdel, Persian Sufi poet (died 1720)
  - Josep Romaguera, Catalan author (died 1723)
  - Ihara Saikaku (井原 西鶴), Japanese poet and creator of the ukiyozōshi (floating world) genre of prose (died 1693)
  - James Tyrrell, English political philosopher (died 1718)
- Probable year of birth
  - Thomas Shadwell, English dramatist (died 1698)
  - Edward Taylor, English-born colonial American poet and author (died 1729)

== Deaths ==
- May 14 – Nicolas Ysambert, French theologian (born c. 1565)
- June 1 – Sir John Suckling, English poet (born 1609)
- July 5 – Festus Hommius, Dutch Calvinist theologian (born 1576)
- Unknown dates
  - Abdul-Haqq Dehlavi, Indian Islamic scholar and writer (born 1551)
  - Sir Francis Kynaston, English poet (born 1587)
  - James Mabbe, English scholar, poet and translator (born 1572)
