= The Idiot (disambiguation) =

The Idiot is a novel by Fyodor Dostoevsky.

The Idiot may also refer to:

== Film and television ==
- The Idiot, a 1914 drama film starring Robert Harron

Adapted from the Dostoevsky novel

- The Idiot (1946 film), a 1946 French film by Georges Lamoin
- The Idiot (1951 film), a 1951 Japanese film by Akira Kurosawa
- The Idiot (1958 film), a 1958 Russian film by Ivan Pyryev
- The Idiot (TV series), a 2003 Russian television series
- The Idiot (2011 film), a 2011 Estonian film by Rainer Sarnet

== Other fiction ==
- The Idiot (Batuman novel), a novel by Elif Batuman
- The Idiot (radio drama), a 1938 Australian radio drama adapted from the Dostoevsky novel

== Music ==
- The Idiot (album), a 1977 album by Iggy Pop
- The Idiot (opera), an opera by Mieczyslaw Weinberg, adapted from the Dostoevsky novel.
- "The Idiot" (song), a song by Stan Rogers

== See also ==
- Idiot (disambiguation)
- The Idiots (disambiguation)
