= Avinger =

Avinger may refer to:

- Avinger, Texas, a town in Cass County, Texas, United States

== People with the surname ==
- Butch Avinger (1928–2008), American football player
- Estelle Avinger (1884–1977), American clubwoman
- Thomas Avinger (1928–2000), American composer, conductor and systems analyst
