= The Man Who Liked Eclairs =

- Genre: drama play
- Running time: 30 mins (8:00 pm – 8:30 pm)9 pm
- Country of origin: Australia
- Language: English
- Syndicates: ABC
- Starring: Helen Jacoby
- Written by: Edmund Barclay; Joy Hollyer
- Directed by: John Cairns
- Original release: May 10, 1945

The Man Who Liked Eclairs is a 1945 Australian radio play by Edmund Barclay and Joy Hollyer. It was set in a "small village in England where everyone knows everyone and everyone’s business." The play is one of the better known works from Barclay and Hollyer and a popular Australian play from the time.

The play was popular and was performed again later in the year and produced again in 1949.

One viewer called it one of the best ABC radio plays of the year.
