= Hollyer =

Hollyer is a surname. Notable people with the surname include:

- Frederick Hollyer (1838–1933), English photographer and engraver
- Joy Hollyer (died 1961), Australian writer
