= Tales of the Southern Cross =

1940 Australian radio drama series by Joy Hollyer

- Genre: drama series
- Running time: 30 mins (5:30 pm – 6:00 pm)
- Country of origin: Australia
- Language: English
- Written by: Joy Hollyer
- Directed by: Charles Wheeler
- Original release: September 1 – December 8, 1940

Tales of the Southern Cross is a 1940 Australian radio drama series by Joy Hollyer. It was a series of children's Sunday plays, based on Australian history and true adventure.

== Select episodes ==
1. "Treasures of the Deep" (1 September) - a boy takes his father's place on a pearling lugger of the coast of Western Australia
2. "Wrecker's Island" (8 September) - a boy fights pirates on Kangaroo Island
3. "The Bold Buccaneer" (15 September) - a cabin boy sails with William Dampier
4. "The Quartermaster" (22 September) - a cabin boy goes to Botany Bay and gets involved with Henry Hacking
5. "Bobbies and Bushies" (29 September) - a boy gets involved with bushrangers
6. "A Brave Australian" (6 October) - a tale about Police Trooper Walker who tracks Captain Thunderbolt
7. The Flying Doctor (13 October)
8. "The Last of the Pirates" (20 October) - about Bully Hayes
9. "The First Farmer" (27 October) - about James Ruse
10. "Bounty Bligh" (3 November) - about William Bligh
11. "Guinea Gold" (10 November) - James Lewis (Peter Finch), New Guinea patrolman, saves an old prospector, Wall Eye Sums (Lou Vernon), from being killed by new Guinea cannibals. The two then discover gold deposits in New Guinea. Wireless Weekly said "Not a breath-taking play, but more interesting than the usual kids’ fare. And well done. Acting by Peter Pinch and Lou Vernon is worth mentioning."
12. "A Modern Moses" (17 November)
13. "Whales in the South Seas" (1 December 1940) - Harry and Denny, two Australian boys who wanted to be whalers, do business with Archibald Mosman.
14. "The Seven Sisters" (8 December 1940) - the Aboriginal story of seven sisters who make up the Southern Cross
