= To Althea, from Prison =

1642 poem by Richard Lovelace

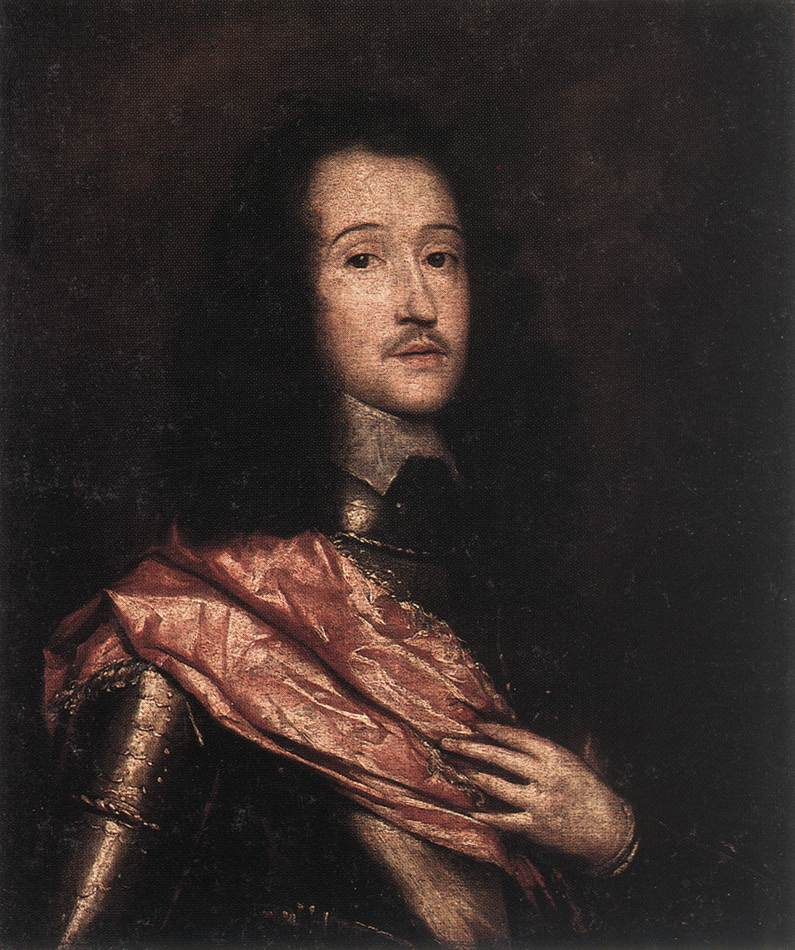
Richard Lovelace by William Dobson.

"To Althea, from Prison" is a poem written by the English poet Richard Lovelace in 1642. The poem is one of Lovelace's best-known works, and its final stanza's first line "Stone walls do not a prison make, Nor iron bars a cage" is often quoted. Lovelace wrote the poem while imprisoned in Gatehouse Prison adjoining Westminster Abbey due to his effort to have the Clergy Act 1640 annulled.

== Text ==
Original text

When love with unconfined wings
Hovers within my gates;
And my divine Althea brings
To whisper at the grates;
When I lye tangled in her haire,
And fetterd to her eye,
The birds, that wanton in the aire,
Know no such liberty.

When flowing cups run swiftly round
With no allaying Thames,
Our carelesse heads with roses bound,
Our hearts with loyal flames;
When thirsty griefe in wine we steepe,
When healths and draughts go free,
Fishes, that tipple in the deepe,
Know no such libertie.

When, like committed linnets, I
With shriller throat shall sing
The sweetnes, mercy, majesty,
And glories of my King.
When I shall voyce aloud, how good
He is, how great should be,
Inlarged winds, that curle the flood,
Know no such liberty.

Stone walls doe not a prison make,
Nor iron bars a cage;
Mindes innocent and quiet take
That for an hermitage;
If I have freedome in my love,
And in my soule am free,
Angels alone that sore above
Enjoy such liberty.

Modernised spelling

When love with unconfinéd wings
Hovers within my gates,
And my divine Althea brings
To whisper at the grates;
When I lie tangled in her hair
And fettered to her eye,
The birds that wanton in the air
Know no such liberty.

When flowing cups run swiftly round,
With no allaying Thames,
Our careless heads with roses bound,
Our hearts with loyal flames;
When thirsty grief in wine we steep,
When healths and draughts go free,
Fishes that tipple in the deep
Know no such liberty.

When like committed linnets I
With shriller throat shall sing
The sweetness, mercy, majesty,
And glories of my King:
When I shall voice aloud how good
He is, how great should be,
Enlargéd winds, that curl the flood,
Know no such liberty.

Stone walls do not a prison make,
Nor iron bars a cage:
Minds innocent and quiet take
That for an hermitage.
If I have freedom in my love,
And in my soul am free,
Angels alone, that soar above,
Enjoy such liberty.

== Overview ==
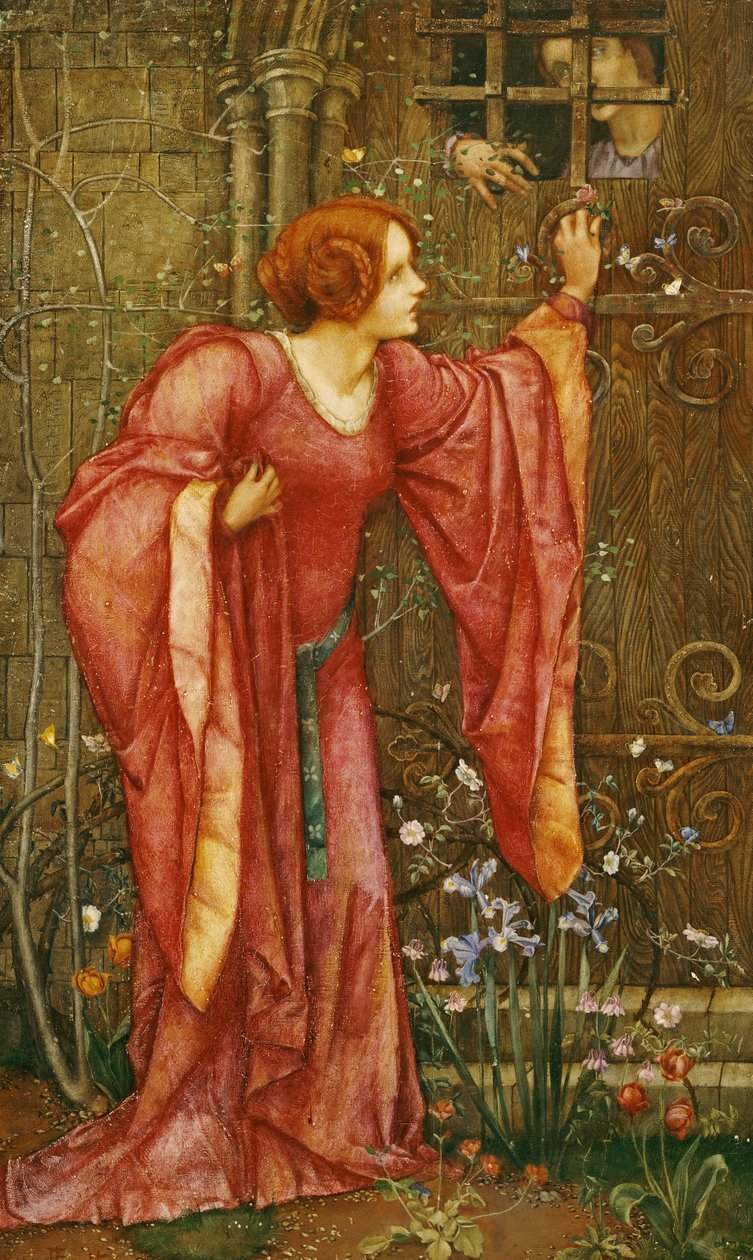
Edward Reginald Frampton

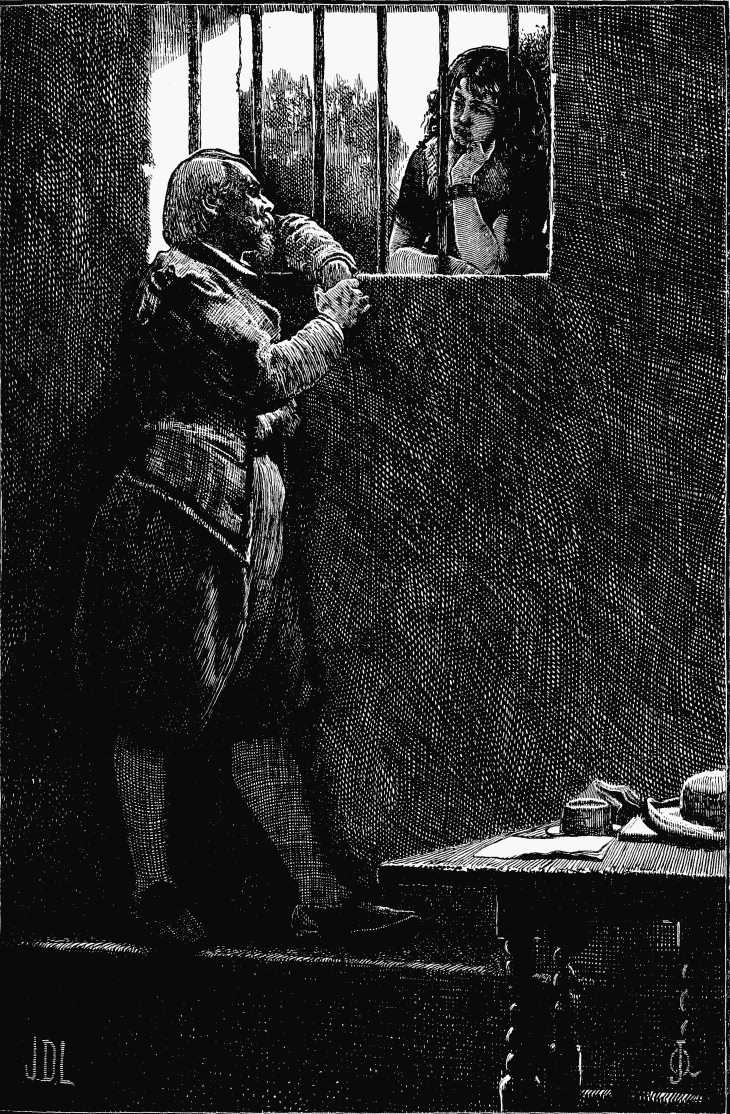
James Davis Cooper

Two artistic treatments of the poem

"To Althea, from Prison" was written by Richard Lovelace in 1642 as a result of his imprisonment. That year, Richard Lovelace presented a petition to the British parliament that protested the Bishops Exclusion Bill. The bill prevented those heavily involved with the Church of England from enacting any temporal control. Lovelace, in contrast, protested that the role of Anglican Bishops that were excluded should be restored in Parliament.

Althea's identity is unknown. "She may even have been a product of Lovelace's imagination. However, evidence suggests she was a woman named Lucy Sacheverell." The poem is quoted in the sixth chapter of Charlotte Brontë's novel Villette, and may have inspired the scenario of Emily Brontë's much-admired poem "The Prisoner". It is also mentioned in Charlotte Smith's novel Marchmont, which has a protagonist named Althea. Margaret Atwood also quotes the famous lines in her novel Hag-Seed when Felix is bringing Anne-Marie into Fletcher Correctional Center (Ch 24, p. 123). Natalie Babbitt also uses a quotation from the poem in her novel Tuck Everlasting, when the main character Winnie Foster remembers the line "Stone walls do not a prison make, Nor iron bars a cage" while helping a jailed prisoner escape (Babbitt 123).

== Musical settings and recordings ==
The poem has been set to music by the British folk group Fairport Convention with music by Dave Swarbrick and features on their album Nine. A highly regarded version likewise appeared on the album Morning Tempest (2000) by Jane and Amanda Threlfall and often features as a highlight/encore of their live performances. It has also been recorded by the folk group Three Pressed Men on their first album Daddy Fox as well as by the Churchfitters on their album New Tales for Old. It was also set by American composer Thomas Avinger in 1960 as one in a set of songs from Lucasta Et Cetera for tenor and instrumental ensemble. It is also suggested that American songwriter Robert Hunter drew inspiration from the poem for the song "Althea" performed by Jerry Garcia and the Grateful Dead.

== See also ==
- To Lucasta, Going to the Warres
- 1642 in poetry
