= Lawrence of Arabia (radio play) =

- Genre: drama play
- Running time: 60 mins
- Country of origin: Australia
- Language: English
- Written by: Edmund Barclay
- Original release: 1935

Lawrence of Arabia is a 1935 Australian radio play by Edmund Barclay about Lawrence of Arabia.

There were a number of other radio plays about Lawrence at this time.

The play was produced again in 1941.

== Premise ==
"The exploits of Colonel Lawrence in connection with the revolt in the desert have become legendary, and it is an almost impossible task to separate the truth from the fanciful. This is due. in part, to the veil of diplomatic mystery which the Great Powers concerned have flung over their negotiations with the Arabs, and, in part, to the attitude of Lawrence himself. Lawrence, dealing on the one hand with the Allied Higher Command and its hidebound “conservatism”—to put it mildly! —and, on the other hand, with such a sensitive, proud, and temperamental race as the Arabs, soon came to regard “truth” as: a dangerous two-edged weapon, to be used very sparingly, if ever. This dramatic presentation is not so much concerned with the ambiguous “facts” of history; it rather endeavors to present a truly human picture of a complex personality amidst complex circumstances, doing a complex job which he loathed, faced, as he was—by the old, old tale—official stupidity and obstructionism."
