= Edmund Piers Barclay =

Australian radio writer/producer and screenwriter

Edmund Barclay
- Born: Edmund Piers Barclay; 2 May 1898; Danapur, Bihar, India
- Died: 26 August 1961 (aged 63); Gosford, New South Wales, Australia
- Occupations: Radio writer/producer and screenwriter

Edmund Piers Barclay (2 May 1898 – 26 August 1961) was an English-Australian writer known for his work in radio drama. Radio historian Richard Lane called him "Australian radio's first great writer and, many would say, Australian radio's greatest playwright ever." Frank Clelow, director of ABC Drama, called him "one of the outstanding radio dramatists of the world, with a remarkable technical skill and ability to use the fade-back without confusing the audience."

== Biography ==
=== Early life ===
Barclay claimed to have been born on 2 May 1898 at Dinapore, India, the son of Major Edmund Compston-Buckleigh, from Middlesex, England. He also maintained that he was educated at Stonyhurst College, joined the Middlesex Regiment on 11 August 1914, and won the Military Cross and Croix de Guerre while serving with the Royal Flying Corps. However, there is no record of anyone with the surname Barclay or Compston-Buckleigh having attended Stonyhurst or served with the Royal Flying Corps.

He claimed that after WWI, he worked as a journalist in Fleet Street, London, until sacked for costing his employers £2000 in a libel suit; he then reputedly ran his own short-lived, weekly newspaper.

=== Australia ===
Arriving in Australia in August 1926, he was determined to show the world that "he was the world's greatest novelist". He worked as a journalist, wrote film scripts (The Silence of Dean Maitland, 1934), short stories, plays, newspaper articles and verse.

In a 1933 interview, he said revues were the hardest to write.

On 17 December 1933, he was employed by the Australian Broadcasting Commission as a dramatist. The first radio play Barclay wrote was An Antarctic Epic.

Barclay wrote very little for the stage. In 1934, he collaborated with Varney Monk as composer to write The Cedar Tree, a musical romance produced by F. W. Thring in Melbourne. Barclay's wife Helene was the lyricist.

Barclay had a big success with the serial As Ye Sow which he turned into a novel. As Ye Sow was "regarded by many critics as the greatest contribution to Australian historical drama." Also hugely popular was Khyber which led to a string of similar adventure serials from Barclay such as Shanghai and Singapore Spy.

By 1940, Barclay was established as the leading radio writer in the country.

In 1943 he collaborated with Joy Hollyer in the verse play With Wings as Eagles, dedicated to the RAAF.

== Family ==
His relationship with his wife Helene, who wrote plays for the ABC, was desperately unhappy, and ended some time before 1940. He formed a relationship with Joy Hollyer and they moved to Umina Beach near Woy Woy. After his death Hollyer married and moved to Turramurra.

Survived by his daughter and son, Barclay died of a coronary occlusion on 26 August 1961 at Gosford, New South Wales. He was interred in Point Clare cemetery with Catholic rites.

== Selected credits ==
=== Films ===
- The Silence of Dean Maitland (1934) – co-screenplay
- Lovers and Luggers (1937) – story

=== Stage ===
- The Cedar Tree (1935) – book of musical
- Neath Southern Skies (1938) – historical pageant

=== Novels ===
- Khyber (1936) – novel, based on his 1935 radio play
- Shanghai (1937) – novel, based on his radio play

=== Radio revues ===
- New Moon (1933) – radio adaptation
- Back to School (1933) – radio revue
- Sydney Goes Bush (1933) – radio revue
- Down for the Show (1933) – radio revue
- Revels in Arcady (1933) – radio revue
- The Magic Carpet (1933) – radio revue
- Pierrot-Etchings (1933) – radio revue
- The Road to Mandalay (1933) – radio revue
- Pastorale (1933) – radio revue
- Tour the Bush (1933) – radio revue
- A Rustic Roundelay (1933)- radio revue
- Historical Nightmare (1933) – radio revue
- Samples (1933) – radio revue
- The Shalimar (1933) – radio revue
- Meadow Srreet (1933) – radio revue
- Homeward Bound (1934)- radio revue
- Dad's Windfall (1934) – radio revue
- Hot News (1934) – radio revue
- The Surprise Party (1934) – radio revue
- A Cherokee Maid (1934) – radio revue
- The Spirit of the Albatross (1934) – radio revue
- Hallo London (1934) – radio revue
- Mutchee Catchee (1934) – radio review
- So Wags the World (1935) – radio revue

=== Radio plays ===
- An Antarctic Epic : The Story of Captain Scott's Tragic Journey to the South Pole (1933) – radio play
- The Three Musketeers (1934) – radio version of the famous story
- Return of the Three Musketeers (1934) – radio play
- The Lost Leader (1934)
- Lovelace (1934) - radio place
- Lawrence of Arabia (1935) – radio play
- Bess o' the Barn (1935) radio play
- Chatterbox (1935) – radio play adaptation
- Heads I Lose (1935)
- Murder at 2FC
- What is Death?
- Get Rich Quick Wallingford (1935) – radio adaptation
- Khyber (1935) – radio play – starred James Raglan
- Love o' Land ' A Cavalcade of Australian History (1935) – radio play
- I'll Leave it to You (1935) – adaptation
- Khyber and Beyond (1936) – radio play, sequel to Khyber
- Salvage (1936) – radio play
- Murder in the Silo (1937) – radio play
- The Girl with the Tattered Glove (1938) – radio play
- Singapore Spy (1939) – radio play
- Valley of the Sky (1939) – radio play
- Mingled Yarn (1937) – based on the life of Shakespeare
- Henry Lawson Stories (1937–38) – various radio plays
- Canberra the Great (1938)
- Job
- Madame Curie (1939) – radio play – starred Peter Finch
- David the King
- The Right to ↔Die
- Nocturne (1939) – radio play
- Spoiled Darlings (1940) – radio play
- These People Are England (1941) – with Joy Hollyer
- They March Again (1941)
- Lord of the Manor (1942)
- With Wings as Eagles (1943) – radio play (co-written with Joy Hollyer)
- The Socialist of Wanley Manor (1944)
- The Black Feather (1944) play
- Joy in the Making (1945)
- As Strong as the Weakest (1945)
- The Bolero Murder (1940s) – radio play
- The Man Who Liked Eclairs (1940s) – radio play
- The Piper (1945)
- His Excellency Governor Shirtsleeves (1948)
- Sir Nigel (1950) – radio serial
- The House of a Thousand Whispers (1950) – radio play
- The Meeting of the Waters (radio play) (1950)
- Dear Little Woman (1951) – radio play
- The Buccaneer: Incidents in the Life of Captain William Dampier, Pirate and Hydrographer
- All that Glisters (1951)
- With Cain Go Wander (1953)
- Ralph Rashleigh and the Bushrangers (1953)
- The Don and Sancho (1954) based on Don Quixote

=== Radio serials ===
- Ivanhoe (1935) radio serial
- Shanghai (1936) – radio play
- Dead or Alive (1936) – radio serial about the Mounties
- As Ye Sow : An Australian Saga (1937–38) – radio play
- Into the Light (1938) – radio serial
- The Idiot (1938) – radio serial
- Waltzing Matilda (1941) – radio serial
- Deeds of Empire (1941) – radio series
- Soldiers Three (1943) – radio serial
- Underground (1943) – radio serial
- Forgotten Men (1944) – radio serial
- Father Brown (1945) radio series
- Tales from the Old Testament (1945) – radio series
- The Faithful Heart (1948)
- The Fortunes of Richard Mahony (1950) radio serial, adapting the novel
- The Lost Gold Mine (1951) – children's serial
- Fisherman's Luck (1952) – children's serial
