= Heads I Lose =

It was great

- Genre: drama play
- Running time: 60 mins (8:00 pm – 9:00 pm)
- Country of origin: Australia
- Language: English
- Home station: 2BL
- Written by: Edmund Barclay
- Directed by: Lawrence H. Cecil
- Original release: August 5, 1935

Heads I Lose is a 1935 Australian radio play by Edmund Barclay. It was called "an original problem play".

The play was produced again in 1936.

== Premise ==
"The theme of the play is the choice of two alternatives which face a young doctor, Martin Craig. Each alternative Involves not only his own happiness, but that of other people, and Craig decides finally the question by the toss of a coin. The resulting drama is worked out cleverly, and the action is then chang ed to show what would have happened if the coin had fallen the other way."
