= Canberra the Great =

1938 Australian radio drama by Edmund Barclay

- Genre: drama feature
- Running time: 45 mins (9:30 pm – 10:15 pm)
- Country of origin: Australia
- Language: English
- Syndicates: ABC
- Written by: Edmund Barclay
- Directed by: Lawrence H Cecil
- Original release: 12 March 1938

Canberra the Great is a 1938 Australian radio drama by Edmund Barclay that celebrated the history of Canberra.

It was performed again in 1944.

== Premise ==
According to Wireless Weekly "In the year 1820 a party of explorers climbed a hill over Lake George and looked down into the limestone plains, being the first white men to do so. Now standing on that same hill one can look down into a city of dreams-come-true— Canberra. In this presentation the history and legend of Australia s magnificent capital city is brought to you in a sequence of dramatic and narrative cameos, as an anniversary celebrations programme. "
