= The House of a Thousand Whispers =

1936 radio play by Edmund Barclay

- Wireless Weekly 24 July 1936
- Genre: drama play
- Running time: 60 mins (9:00 pm – 10:00 pm)
- Country of origin: Australia
- Language: English
- Home station: 2FC
- Hosted by: ABC
- Written by: Edmund Barclay
- Original release: 24 July 1936

The House of a Thousand Whispers is a 1936 Australian radio play by Edmund Barclay.

The play was very popular and repeated later in the year as well as in 1939, 1941, 1946 and 1950.

Peter Finch starred in the 1939 production.

== Premise ==
A married woman and her lover elope and take refuge in an old house on the Yorkshire moors. The woman disappears and the lover goes looking for her.
