= Singapore Spy =

1939 Australian radio serial by Edmund Barclay

- Genre: serial drama
- Running time: 30 mins (8:00 pm – 8:30 pm)
- Country of origin: Australia
- Language: English
- Home station: 2FC
- Written by: Edmund Barclay
- Directed by: Paul Jacklin
- Original release: January 9 – July 3, 1939
- No. of series: 1
- No. of episodes: 26

Singapore Spy is a 1939 Australian radio drama serial from Edmund Barclay set in Singapore. It was an adventure serial in the vein of his earlier works Khyber and Shanghai.

== Premise ==
British agents fight an enemy agent organisation, the Two Brothers, in Singapore.

== Select episodes ==
- Ep 1 (9 Jan) - The Two Brothers
- Ep 2 (16 Jan) - Murder on the High Seas
- Ep 3 (27 Jan) - Cross Purposes
- Ep 4 (3 Feb) - The Lion's Den
- Ep 5 (10 Feb)
- Ep 6 (17 Feb)
- Ep 7 (24 Feb) Death at the Dance
- Ep 8 Guilty Glenda
- Ep 9 Doped
- Ep 11 Gone Away
- Ep 12 Grund Goes Home
- Ep 13 Marcia's Choice
- Ep 14 Fire
- Ep 15 Glenda's Guile
- Ep 16 Mister Mee's Farewell
- Ep 17 Where is Marcia?
- Ep 18 Lost at Sea
- Ep 19 (May) The Fatal Hour
- Ep 20 (May) Roger's Game
- Ep 21 (May) Shots in the Night
- Ep 22 (5 June) Diamond Cut Diamond
- Ep 23 (12 June) One of the Two Brothers
- Ep 24 (19 June) Gone to Earth
- Ep 25 (26 June) Jaffrey's Farewell
- Ep 26 Last ep (3 July) - Glenda's Secret
