= The Tyrant Years =

1958 Australian radio play

ABC Weekly 27 Aug 1958

The Tyrant Years is a 1958 Australian radio play by Joy Hollyer about the last years in the life of Charles Dickens.

The play was well received and was produced again in 1959, 1962, 1968 and 1974.

== Premise ==
"At 45, (1857), Dickens was at the height of his powers. But at home his personal life was beginning to break up. His pallid wife, Catherine, was quite inadequate for him and his attention turned to a beautiful young actress, Ellen Ternan. It is from this point that Joy Hollyer develops the complicated and absorbingly interesting pattern of a brilliantly successful and vital man growing old and unwilling to accept age."

== Cast of 1958 Production ==
- James Condon as Charles Dickens
- Amber Mae Cecil as Ellen Ternan
- Lyndal Barbour as Georgina Hogarth
- Peter Owen as Forster
- Shulamita Rovkin as Mamie Dickens
- Derani Scarr as Katie Dickens
- John Sherman as Dolby
- Brenda Senders as Catherine Dickens
- Olive Walter as Mrs. Ternan
- Mary Mackay as Mrs. Hogarth
- Janne Coghlan as Maria Ternan
- Walter Pym as Lord Lytton

== Cast of 1959 Production ==
- Patricia Kennedy as Georgina Hogarth
- Mary Ward as Catherine Dickens
- Lesley Pope as Mamie Dickens
- Georgina Batterham as Katie Dickens
- Frank Gatlin as Charles Dickens
- Agnes Dobson as Mrs. Hogarth
- Beverley Dunn as Ellen Ternan
- Bettine KauJTmann as Maria Ternan
- Moira Carleton as Mrs. Ternan
- Edward Howell as Dolby
- Williams Lloyd as Forster
- Eleanor Clapham as Pianist
- Paul Bacon as Lord Lytton
