= Mingled Yarn =

1937 play by Edmund Barclay

- Genre: drama play
- Running time: 60 mins (9:15 pm – 10:15 pm)
- Country of origin: Australia
- Language: English
- Home station: 4QG
- Syndicates: ABC
- Written by: Edmund Barclay
- Recording studio: Brisbane
- Original release: April 23, 1937

Mingled Yarn is a 1937 Australian radio play by Edmund Barclay about the life of William Shakespeare. It was broadcast on the ABC for Australian Drama Week.

It aired on the anniversary of Shakespeare's birthday.

Leslie Rees later wrote "Edmund Barclay wrote what seemed to me only the skeleton or prologue to an excellent study of the craftsman."

== Premise ==
A series of imaginary incidents in the life of William Shakespeare starting in 1588 with Shakespeare as a young man and ending with him in retirement at Stratford on Avon being visited by his friend, Ben Jonson.
