= Gatehouse Prison =

Prison in Westminster

Coordinates: 51.4992°N 0.1290°W

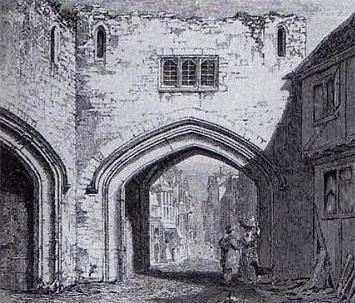
Gatehouse Prison in the 18th century

Gatehouse Prison was a prison in Westminster, built in 1370 as the gatehouse of Westminster Abbey. It was first used as a prison by the Abbot, a powerful churchman who held considerable power over the precincts and sanctuary. It was one of the prisons which supplied the Old Bailey with information on former prisoners (such as their identity or prior criminal records) for making indictments against criminals.

While he was imprisoned in the Gatehouse for petitioning to have the Clergy Act 1640 annulled, Richard Lovelace wrote "To Althea, from Prison", with its famous lines

Stone walls do not a prison make,
Nor iron bars a cage;

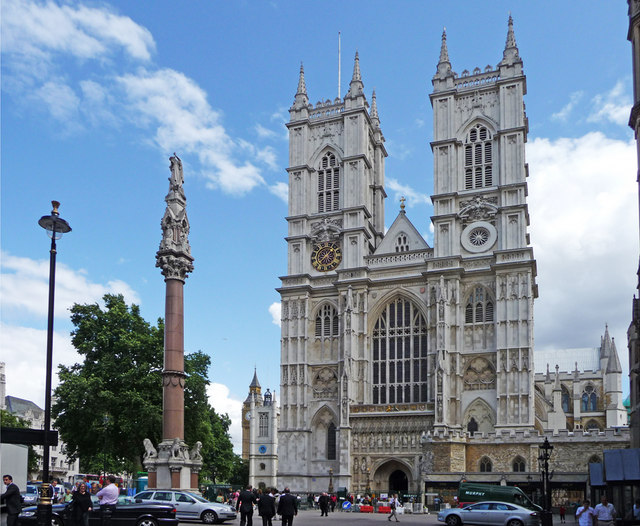
The Crimean War Memorial, on the site of the Gatehouse in front of Westminster Abbey

The Gatehouse prison was demolished in 1776. On its site, in front of the Abbey's Great West Door, is the Westminster scholars' Crimean War Memorial.

== Notable prisoners ==
- Giles Wigginton, a Puritan cleric and controversialist, was imprisoned for 2 months around 1584, for refusing to take an oath.
- Sir Walter Raleigh was held here the night before he was beheaded in Old Palace Yard, Westminster on 29 October 1618.
- Thomas Bates
- Christopher Holywood
- Henry Lok
- Richard Lovelace
- Samuel Pepys
- John Southworth
- Sir Thomas Ragland
- John Bastwick
- Henry Savile
- Laurence Vaux
- Jeffrey Hudson
