= The Story of Good Will =

- Based on: pantomime by Joy Hollyer
- Directed by: Bill Bain
- Country of origin: Australia
- Original language: English

Production
- Running time: 30 mins
- Production company: ABC

Original release
- Network: ABC
- Release: 24 December 1959 (Sydney, Melbourne, Brisbane)

The Story of Good Will is a 1959 Australian TV play. It was a pantomime produced for Christmas Eve and was Australia's first television pantomime.

The same night the ABC broadcast a nativity play The House by the Stable.

== Plot ==
In the land of Christmas Country, the King has banned Merry Christmasses. Good Will, the only man who knows how to make Merry Christmasses, has disappeared, s Princess Merry asks Jan the Gardener (a Prince in disguise) to help find him.

== Cast ==
- Robyn Hosking as the Queen
- Brian Fitzsimmons as the King
- Barbara Frawley as the Princess
- Earle Cross as Jan the Gardner
- John Tasker as don't-ask-me
- Reg Quartly as dragon

== Production ==
It was filmed at the ABC's studios in Gore Hill and featured stars of the ABC TV's Children's Club. The pantomime had been written two years earlier.
