= Lovelace (radio play) =

- Wireless Weekly 5 Oct 1934
- Genre: drama play
- Running time: 60mins (8:00 pm – 9:00 pm)
- Country of origin: Australia
- Language: English
- Starring: John Longden
- Written by: Edmund Barclay
- Directed by: Lawrence Cecil
- Original release: October 9, 1934

Lovelace is a 1934 Australian radio play by Edmund Barclay. It was inspired by the real life Colonel Richard Lovelace but heavily fictionalised.

The 1934 version starred visiting British film star John Longden.

The play sold to South Africa.

It was produced again in 1935, 1937 and 1938.

The original director was Laurence Cecil.

== Premise ==
"It was Lovelace who told that charming lie, “Stone Walls Do not a Prison Make”; and he was responsible for the equally charming quibble: “I could not love thee, dear, so much, loved I not honor more.” He wrote some good songs and bad coup-lets; and after his exile during the Cromwell's dictatorship he returned and died a pauper in Gunpowder Alley, Bride's Church, Fleet Street. Some argue that he didn't die a pauper, but had four pounds a week till he died. Aubrey says he was a very handsome man, “but damnable prowd.” This play opens in the House of Commons on the morning when Charles First when down to arrest the five members, and the memmers shouted for their privileges, and it includes an Oliver Cromwell “somewhat different from the accepted conception”."
