= To Lucasta, Going to the Warres =

"To Lucasta, Going to the Warres" is a 1649 poem by Richard Lovelace. It was published in the collection Lucasta by Lovelace of that year. The initial poems were addressed to Lucasta, not clearly identified with any real-life woman, under the titles "Going beyond the Seas" and "Going to the Warres", on a chivalrous note.

== Text ==
Tell me not, (sweet,) I am unkinde,
That from the nunnerie
Of thy chaste breast and quiet minde
To warre and armes I flie.

True: a new Mistresse now I chase,
The first foe in the field;
And with a stronger faith imbrace
A sword, a horse, a shield.

Yet this inconstancy is such,
As you too shall adore;
I could not love thee, dear, so much,
Lov'd I not Honour more.

== See also ==
- To Althea, from Prison
- 1640 in poetry, the year Lucasta was written
- 1649 in poetry, the year the poem was published
