= Idiot (disambiguation) =

An idiot is a stupid or foolish person.

Idiot(s) may also refer to:

- Idiot (1992 film), by Mani Kaul
- Idiot (2002 film), by Puri Jagannadh
- Idiot (2012 film), by Rajib Biswas
- Idiot (2021 film), by Rambhala
- Idiot (album), a 2020 album by Artigeardit
- Idiots (2012 film), a film by K. S. Bava
- Idiots (2026 film), an American comedy film

== See also ==
- The Idiot (disambiguation)
- The Idiots (disambiguation)
