= Thomas Ragland =

16th-century English politician

Sir Thomas Ragland, B. 1520 of Carnllwyd, Glamorganshire, Wales and Roughton Holme, Norfolk and Walworth, Surrey, England, was a politician.

== Family ==
Ragland was the eldest son of Sir John Ragland of Carnllwyd. John Ragland had been knighted after the 1513 Battle of Guinegate by Henry VIII of England. He was also present at The Field of the Cloth of Gold.

This Thomas Ragland (who is to be distinguished from his uncle Sir Thomas Ragland) succeeded his father in 1550. By 1551, he had married Ann Woodhouse, daughter of Sir Roger Woodhouse of Kimberley, Norfolk. She was the widow of Christopher Coningsby of Wallington, Norfolk and had daughters by him, whose inheritance she was careful to protect from Sir Thomas Ragland in her 1562 will. They had more than one child, but nothing more is recorded of them.

== Career ==
Ragland was justice of the peace of Norfolk from 1550.

He was a member (MP) of the Parliament of England for Malmesbury in 1563.

== Later life ==
Records show that in August 1578 he was in the Gatehouse Prison.
