= The Idiots =

The Idiots may refer to:

- The Idiots (1998 film), a Danish film by Lars von Trier
- The Idiot(s), a 2026 film by Małgorzata Szumowska
- "The Idiots" (short story), a short story by Joseph Conrad
- "The Idiots", a self-deprecating nickname for the 2004 Boston Red Sox

== See also ==
- Idiot (disambiguation)
- The Idiot (disambiguation)
