= Alonso de Castillo Solórzano =

Spanish novelist and playwright

Alonso de Castillo Solórzano (1584?, probably in Tordesillas, Valladolid – 1647?, probably in Palermo) was a Spanish novelist and playwright.

== Life ==
He is said to have been baptized October 1, 1584. He is next heard of at Madrid in 1619 as a man of literary tastes. He was a close friend of Sebastian Francisco de Medrano, founder and president of the Medrano Academy (Poetic Academy of Madrid). Castillo joined the group of poets in 1619. While in the service of the Marquis de Villars, he issued his first work, Donaires del Parnaso (1624–1625), two volumes of humorous poems; his Tardes entretenidas (1625) and Jornadas alegres (1626) proved that he was a novelist by vocation.

Shortly afterwards he joined the household of the Marquis de los Vélez, Viceroy of Valencia, and published in quick succession three clever picaresque novels: La Niña de los embustes, Teresa de Manzanares (1634), Las Aventuras del Bachiller Trapaza (1637), and a continuation entitled La Garduña de Sevilla y Anzuelo de las bolsas (1642). To these shrewd cynical stories he owes his reputation.

He followed the Marquis de los Vélez in his disastrous campaign in Catalonia (the Reapers' War) and accompanied him to Rome, where the defeated general was sent as ambassador. Castillo Solórzano's death occurred before 1648, but the exact date is uncertain. His prolonged absence from Madrid prevented him from writing as copiously for the stage as he would otherwise have done; but he was popular as a playwright both at home and abroad.

=== Works ===
His Marqués del Cigarral and El Mayorazgo figurón are the sources respectively of Scarron's Don Jophet d'Arménie and L'Héritier ridicule. Among his numerous remaining works may be mentioned Las harpías en Madrid (1633), Fiestas del Jardín (1634), Los Alivios de Casandra (1640) and the posthumous Quinta de Laurel (1649); the witty observation of these books forms a singular contrast to the prim devotion of his Sagrario de Valencia (1635).

== Bibliography ==
- Alan Soons, Alonso de Castillo Solórzano, Boston(USA): Twayne Publishers, 1978.
- Alan Soons, Siete Siglos de Autores Españoles ed. Kurt & Theo Reichenberger, Kassel, 1991: 143-146
