= The Idiot (radio drama) =

- Genre: drama
- Running time: 75 mins (8:00 pm – 9:15 pm)
- Country of origin: Australia
- Language: English
- Written by: Edmund Barclay based on the novel by Fyodor Dostoevsky
- Original release: February 3, 1938

The Idiot is a 1938 Australian radio drama. It was adapted by Edmund Barclay from the novel The Idiot by Fyodor Dostoevsky.

Barclay's adaptation has been called a "radio masterpiece". It was one of a series of classical novel adaptations by Barclay for the Australian Broadcasting Corporation (ABC); Leslie Rees listed The Idiot among the best of these.

The production was well received and the adaptation was recorded again in 1947.

A copy of the script is at the Fryer Library at the University of Queensland.
