= Thomas Avinger =

Thomas Avinger (Weslaco, Texas, September 28, 1928 – Houston, Texas, November 18, 2000) was an American composer, conductor and systems analyst for the oil industry.

== Biography ==
Born in Weslaco, Texas, he taught himself to play the piano at the age of 19. He attended Edinburg Junior College (which later became the University of Texas–Pan American and more recently became the University of Texas Rio Grande Valley). He then graduated from Baylor University in 1952 with a Bachelor of Music degree and a Master of Music degree in 1957. Between his college degrees (from September 1952 to June 1954), he was stationed with the United States Army at Fort Leonard Wood, Missouri, where he was the musical director of the Soldiers' Section of Special Services.

After completing his graduate work, he began working for the Humble Oil and Refining Company (now part of Exxon-Mobil, USA). He spent the next forty years there as a systems analyst. He was married to JoAnn Avinger for 45 years, and they had two sons, Erich and Peter.

== Music ==
Avinger was comfortable with his career in technology while also composing music when possible, saying "I think I have the best of both worlds. I have the satisfaction of a corporate career that I enjoy and the pleasure of composing music and hearing it performed. One doesn't have to choose between the arts and business today."

Like the better-known Charles Ives, he was not a full-time musician or composer, yet he completed at least 50 musical works, including a one-act opera, a ballet suite, orchestral works with chorus, and various smaller works for chorus, piano, chamber ensembles, and art songs. His musical style has been compared to Shostakovich's for its "lofty, inspiring melodies and startling romantic passages".

During his lifetime, his works were performed by the Dallas Symphony Orchestra for a composers conference moderated by Darius Milhaud and at Baylor University, Eastern Illinois University, the Moores School of Music, and many churches and smaller venues in Texas.

As a performing musician, Avinger conducted and sang in numerous choirs and was the assistant conductor of the Houston Symphony Chorale.

== Compositions ==
Stage works

- What Makes You So Grand?, musical comedy in two acts, 1948
- The Stranger (Rupert Brooke play), opera in one act, 1951–52
- Goblin Market, ballet, 1960

Instrumental and keyboard

- Theme and Variations, piano, 1950
- Variations on a Theme of Melancholy, wind septet, 1951
- Introduction and Fugato, string quartet, 1954
- First Piano Sonata, 1968
- First Violin Sonata, 1968

Large choral works

- The Song of Songs which is Solomon's (Song of Songs, oratorio, 1954–55, revised 1968
- A Cantata for Christmastide, cantata, 1972

Short choral works

- Psalm I, 1959
- Love Came Down At Christmas (Christina Rossetti), 1959
- Five Qumran Hymns, 1960

Solo voice

- Dead Men's Love Rupert Brooke, 1950
- The Treasure Rupert Brooke, 1951
- Four Folk Songs from Green Grow the Lilacs, 1952
1. Miner Boy
2. Young Men Will Go Courtin'
3. Custer's Last Stand
4. Green Grow the Lilacs
- The Man in the Closed Ward (Theodore Thieme), tenor and piano, 1953–54
1. The man in the closed ward
2. Mind metamorphosing color and light
3. Blind body closing in fright
4. The petals relax spasmodically
5. And the pretty heart of the flower is burned up
- After Death (Christina Rossetti), 1958
- Lucasta Et Cetera (Richard Lovelace), tenor and chamber ensemble, 1960
1. To Lucasta (Going beyond the Seas)
2. To Lucasta (Going to the Warres)
3. The Scrutinie (Why should you sweare)
4. Gratiana (Dauncing and Singing)
5. To Althea (Written from Prison)
6. Sonnet (When I by thy faire shape)
