= The Holy State and the Profane State =

1642 book by Thomas Fuller

The Holy State and the Profane State (Prophane in the original, sometimes shortened to The Holy State) is a 1642 book by English churchman and historian Thomas Fuller. It describes the holy state as existing in the family and in public life, gives rules of conduct, model "characters" for the various professions and profane biographies. It was perhaps the most popular of Fuller's writings, having been reprinted four times after the first run sold out.

The book contains four volumes, three of which outline the characteristics of archetypes such as "the good husband", "the good servant", and "the good widow", and the fourth containing biographies intended to illustrate profane people.
