= Joy Hollyer =

Australian writer

Joy Hollyer (died August 1961) was an Australian writer whose career ranged from the 1940s until the 1970s. She collaborated a number of times on radio scripts with Edmund Barclay and wrote songs with Cecil Fraser. She wrote a large number of adaptations for ABC radio as well as television scripts, short stories and plays for children.

Some time before 1940, she left Sydney for Umina Beach near Woy Woy with Barclay, whose marriage had broken up. In 1943 they wrote the verse play With Wings as Eagles, dedicated to the RAAF. They collaborated on other work, but Barclay's output dried up due to the effects of alcohol, while Hollyer's blossomed. He died in 1961 and she married and moved to Turramurra.

== Select credits ==
- Tales of the Southern Cross – radio play for children
- Silver Wedding (1958) – radio play
- The Tyrant Years (1958) – radio play
- The Story of Good Will (1959) – TV pantomime
