= Thomas Fuller =

English churchman and historian (1608–1661)

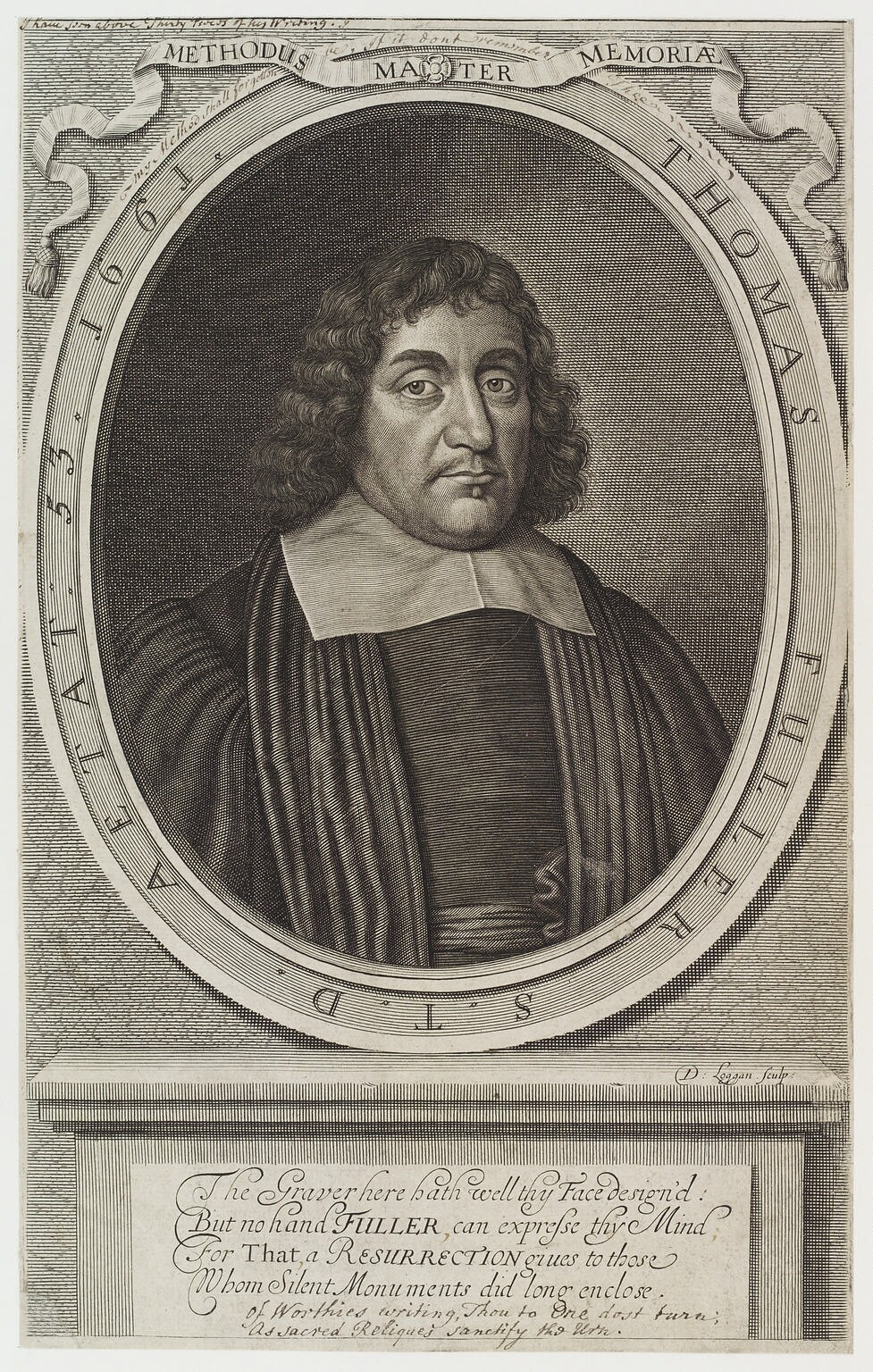
- Born: 1608; Aldwinkle St Peter's, Northamptonshire, England
- Died: 16 August 1661 (aged 52–53); Covent Garden, London, England
- Education: University of Cambridge
- Occupations: Clergyman and historian
- Known for: Worthies of England

Thomas Fuller (baptised 19 June 1608; died 16 August 1661) was an English churchman and historian. He is now remembered for his writings, particularly his Worthies of England, published in 1662, after his death. He was a prolific author, and one of the first English writers able to live by his pen (and his many patrons).

== Early life ==
Fuller was the eldest son of Thomas Fuller, rector of Aldwinkle St Peter's, Northamptonshire. He was born at his father's rectory and was baptised on 19 June 1608. Dr John Davenant, bishop of Salisbury, was his uncle and godfather. According to John Aubrey, Fuller was "a boy of pregnant wit". At thirteen he was admitted to Queens' College, Cambridge, then presided over by John Davenant. His cousin, Edward Davenant, was a tutor there. He did well academically; and in Lent 1624–1625 he became B.A. and in July 1628, at only 20 years of age, received his M.A. After being overlooked in an election of fellows of his college, he moved to Sidney Sussex College, Cambridge in November 1628. In 1630 he received from Corpus Christi College the curacy of St Bene't's, Cambridge.

Fuller's oratory soon attracted attention. In June 1631 his uncle gave him a prebend in Salisbury, where his father, who would die in the following year, already held a canonry. The rectory of Broadwindsor, Dorset, then in the diocese of Bristol, was his next preferment (1634); and on 11 June 1635 he achieved the degree of Bachelor of Divinity from Sidney Sussex College, Cambridge. In 1640, he was elected proctor for Bristol in the memorable Convocation of Canterbury, which assembled with the Short Parliament. On the sudden dissolution of the latter he joined those who urged that convocation should likewise dissolve. That opinion was overruled; and the assembly continued to sit by royal writ. Fuller wrote a valuable account of the proceedings of this synod in his Church History, although he was fined £200 for remaining.

== Civil War period ==
At Broadwindsor, early in 1641, Thomas Fuller, his curate Henry Sanders, the churchwardens, and five others certified that their parish, represented by 242 adult males, had taken the Protestation ordered by the speaker of the Long Parliament. Fuller was not formally dispossessed of his living and prebend on the triumph of the Presbyterian party, but he relinquished both preferments about this time. For a short time he preached with success at the Inns of Court, and then at the invitation of the master of the Savoy, Walter Balcanqual, and the brotherhood of that foundation, became lecturer at their chapel of St Mary Savoy. Some of the best discourses of the witty preacher were delivered at the Savoy to audiences which extended into the chapel-yard. In one he set forth with searching and truthful minuteness the hindrances to peace, and urged the signing of petitions to the king at Oxford, and to the parliament, to continue their care in advancing an accommodation.

In his Appeal of Injured Innocence Fuller says that he was once deputed to carry a petition to the king at Oxford. This has been identified with a petition entrusted to Sir Edward Wardour, clerk of the pells, Dr Dukeson, "Dr Fuller," and four or five others from the city of Westminster and the parishes contiguous to the Savoy. A pass was granted by the House of Lords, on 2 January 1643, for an equipage of two coaches, four or six horses and eight or ten attendants. On the arrival of the deputation at the Treaty of Uxbridge, on 4 January, officers of the Parliamentary army stopped the coaches and searched the gentlemen; and they found upon the latter "two scandalous books arraigning the proceedings of the House," and letters with ciphers to Lord Viscount Falkland and the Lord Spencer. A joint order of both Houses remanded the party; and Fuller and his friends were briefly imprisoned. The Westminster Petition reached the king's hands; and it was published with the royal reply.

When it was expected, three months later, that a favourable result would attend the negotiations at Oxford, Fuller preached a sermon at Westminster Abbey, on 27 March 1643, on the anniversary of Charles I's accession, on the text, "Yea, let him take all, so my Lord the King return in peace." On Wednesday 26 July, he preached on church reformation, satirising the religious reformers, and maintaining that only the Supreme Power could initiate reforms.

He was now obliged to leave London, and in August 1643 he joined the king at Oxford, where he lodged in a chamber at Lincoln College. Thence he put forth a witty and effective reply to John Saltmarsh, who had attacked his views on ecclesiastical reform. Fuller subsequently published by royal request a sermon preached on 10 May 1644, at St Mary's, Oxford, before the king and Prince Charles, called Jacob's Vow. The spirit of Fuller's preaching, characterised by calmness and moderation, offended the high royalists. To silence unjust censures he became chaplain to the regiment of Sir Ralph Hopton.

For the first five years of the war, he "had little list or leisure to write, fearing to be made a history, and shifting daily for my safety. All that time I could not live to study, who did only study to live." After the defeat of Hopton at Cheriton Down, Fuller retreated to Basing House. He took an active part in its defence, and his life with the troops caused him to be afterwards regarded as one of "the great cavalier parsons". He compiled in 1645 a small volume of prayers and meditations – the Good Thoughts in Bad Times – which, set up and printed in the besieged city of Exeter, where he had retired, was called by himself "the first fruits of Exeter press". It was inscribed to Lady Dalkeith, governess to the infant princess, Henrietta Anne (b. 1644), to whose household he was attached as chaplain. The corporation gave him the Bodleian lectureship on 21 March 1646, and he held it until 17 June following, soon after the surrender of the city to the parliament.

The Fear of Losing the Old Light (1646) was his farewell discourse to his Exeter friends. Under the Articles of Surrender Fuller made his composition with the government at London, his "delinquency" being that he had been present in the king's garrisons. In Andronicus, or the Unfortunate Politician (1646), partly authentic and partly fictitious, he satirised the leaders of the Revolution; and for the comfort of sufferers by the war he issued (1647) a second devotional manual, entitled Good Thoughts in Worse Times, abounding in fervent aspirations, and drawing moral lessons in beautiful language out of the events of his life or the circumstances of the time. In grief over his losses, which included his library and manuscripts (his "upper and nether millstone"), and over the calamities of the country, he wrote his work on the Cause and Cure of a Wounded Conscience (1647). It was prepared at Boughton House in his native county, where he and his son were entertained by Edward Lord Montagu, who had been one of his contemporaries at the university and had taken the side of the parliament. For the next few years of his life Fuller was mainly dependent upon his dealings with booksellers, of whom he asserted that none had ever lost by him. He made considerable progress in an English translation from the manuscript of the Annales of his friend Archbishop Ussher.

== Under the Commonwealth ==
Amongst his benefactors was Sir John Danvers of Chelsea, the regicide. Fuller in 1647 began to preach at St Clement's, Eastcheap, and elsewhere in the capacity of lecturer. While at St Clement's he was suspended; but soon recovered his freedom and preached wherever he was invited. At Chelsea, where he also occasionally officiated, he covertly preached a sermon on the death of Charles, but he did not break with his Roundhead patrons. James Hay, 2nd Earl of Carlisle made him his chaplain, and presented him in 1648 or 1649 to the curacy of Waltham Abbey. His possession of the living was in jeopardy on the appointment of Oliver Cromwell's "Tryers"; but he evaded their inquisitorial questions by his ready wit. He was not disturbed at Waltham in 1655, when the Protector's edict prohibited the adherents of the late king from preaching.

There is good reason to suppose that Fuller was at the Hague immediately before the Restoration, in the retinue of Lord Berkeley, one of the commissioners of the House of Lords, whose last service to his friend was to interest himself in obtaining him a bishopric. A Panegyrick to His Majesty on his Happy Return, one of the many contemporary poems celebrating the restoration of Charles II, was the last of Fuller's verse efforts.

== After the Restoration ==
On 2 August 1660, by royal letters, he was admitted Doctor of Divinity at Cambridge. He resumed his lectures at the Savoy, where Samuel Pepys heard him preach; but he preferred his conversation or his books to his sermons. Fuller's last promotion was that of Chaplain Extraordinary to Charles II.

== Death ==
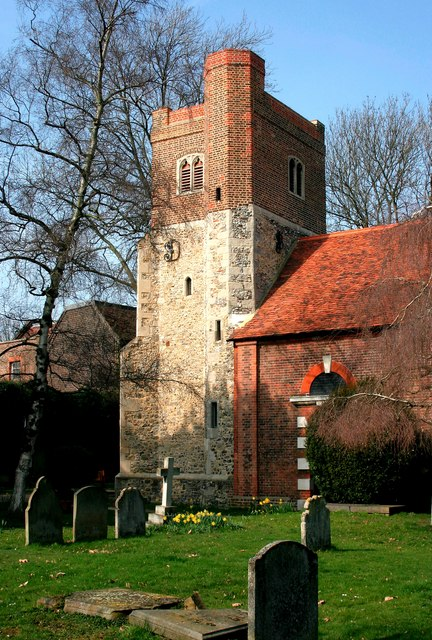
St Dunstan's Church, Cranford Park, where Fuller was buried.

In the summer of 1661 Fuller visited the West in connection with the business of his prebend, which had been restored to him. On Sunday 12 August, while preaching at the Savoy, he was seized with typhus fever, and died at his new lodgings in Covent Garden on 16 August. He was buried in St Dunstan's Church, Cranford, Middlesex (of which he was rector). A mural tablet was afterwards set up on the north side of the chancel, with an epitaph which contains a conceit worthy of his own pen, to the effect that while he was endeavouring (i.e. in the Worthies) to give immortality to others, he himself attained it.

== Works ==
- David's Heinous Sinne, Heartie Repentance, Heavie Punishment (1631). Fuller published a poem on the subject of David and Bathsheba.
- The Historie of the Holy Warre (1639). A history of the Crusades from the fall of Jerusalem under Titus in 70 AD through 1290. Includes critical commentary, a complete chronology, and bibliography. With an introduction by English classical scholar James Duport (1606–1679). The History of the Holy War is an 1840 edition of the work.
- Joseph's party-coloured Coat (1640). His first published volume of sermons
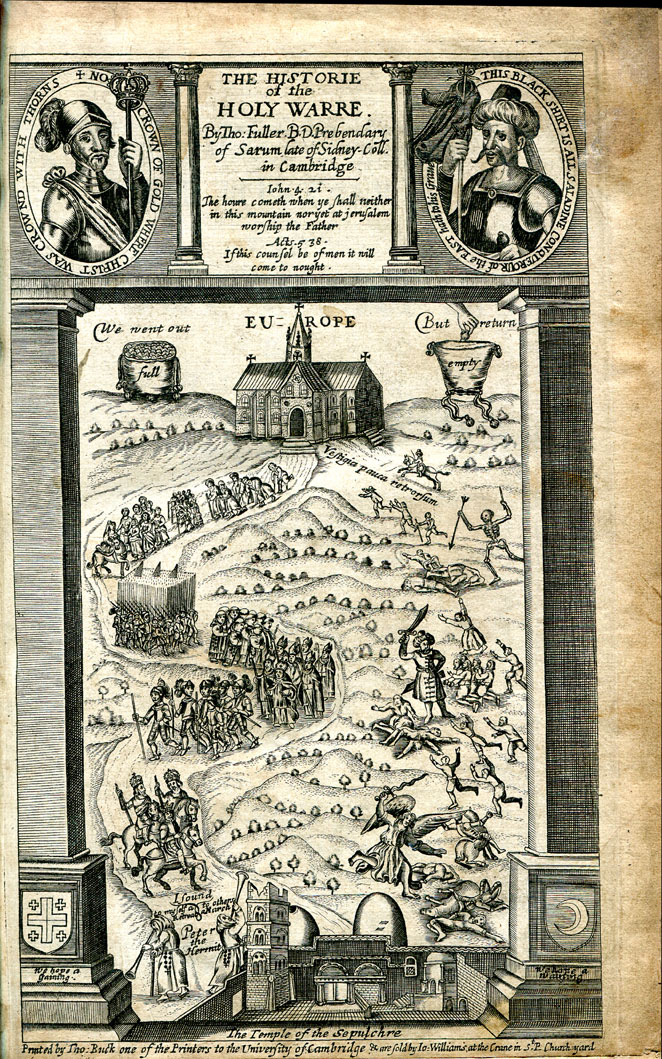
  Engraved title page of the third edition of Historie of the Holy Warre by Thomas Fuller, 1647
  .
- The Holy State and the Prophane State (1642). This work describes the holy state as existing in the family and in public life, gives rules of conduct, model "characters" for the various professions and profane biographies. It was perhaps the most popular of all his writings.
- A Pisgah-Sight of Palestine and the confines thereof; with the history of the Old and New Testaments acted thereon (1650). With facsimiles of all the quaint maps and illustrations of the original edition. Lionel Cranfield, 3rd Earl of Middlesex, who lived at Copt Hall, near Waltham, gave him what remained of the books of the lord treasurer his father; and through the good offices of the marchioness of Hertford, part of his own pillaged library was restored to him. Fuller was thus able to prosecute his literary labours, producing successively his descriptive geography of the Holy Land.
- Abel Redevivus: or The dead yet speaking. The lives and the deaths of the moderne divines. Written by severall able and learned men (whose names ye shall finde in the epistle to the reader.) And now digested into one volumne, for the benefit and satisfaction of all those that desire to be acquainted with the paths of piety and virtue. (1651). London, John Stafford.
- Church-History of Britain, from the birth of Jesus Christ until the year 1648 (1655). Church-History was printed with The History of the University of Cambridge since the Conquest and The History of Waltham Abbey. These works were furthered by his connection with Sion College, London, where he had a room. The Church History was angrily attacked from the high-church side by Peter Heylin. At the Oxford Act of 1657, Robert South, who was Terrae filius, lampooned Fuller, whom he described in this Oratio as living in London, ever scribbling and each year bringing forth new folia like a tree. At length, continues South, the Church-History came forth with its 166 dedications to wealthy and noble friends; and with this huge volume under one arm, and his wife (said to be little of stature) on the other, he ran up and down the streets of London, seeking at the houses of his patrons invitations to dinner, to be repaid by his dull jests at table. His last and best patron was George Berkeley, 1st Earl Berkeley (1628–1698), of Cranford House, Middlesex, whose chaplain he was, and who gave him Cranford rectory (1658). Fuller afterwards dedicated The Appeal of Injured Innocence (1659), his reply to Heylyn's Examen Historicum, to Berkeley. In An Alarum to the Counties of England and Wales (1660) Fuller argued for a free and full parliament—free from force, as he expressed it, as well as from abjurations or previous engagements. Mixt Contemplations in Better Times (1660), dedicated to Lady Monk, tendered advice in the spirit of its motto, "Let your moderation be known to all men: the Lord is at hand".
- 'Notes upon Jonah', (1657). John Stafford.
- History of the Worthies of England (1662). Fuller's best-known work.
- The Poems and translations in verse, including fifty-nine hitherto unpublished epigrams of Fuller and his much-wished form of prayer for the first time collected and edited with introduction and notes, by rev. Grosart, 257 pp., Liverpool, printed for private circulation (1868).

A Pisgah-Sight of Palestine – Gallery

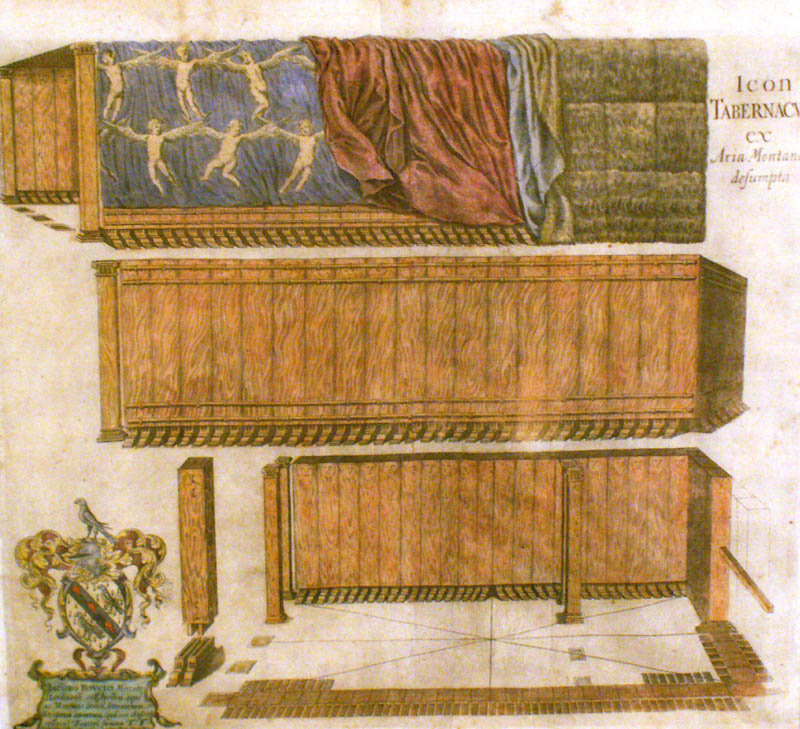
Icon Tabernaculi

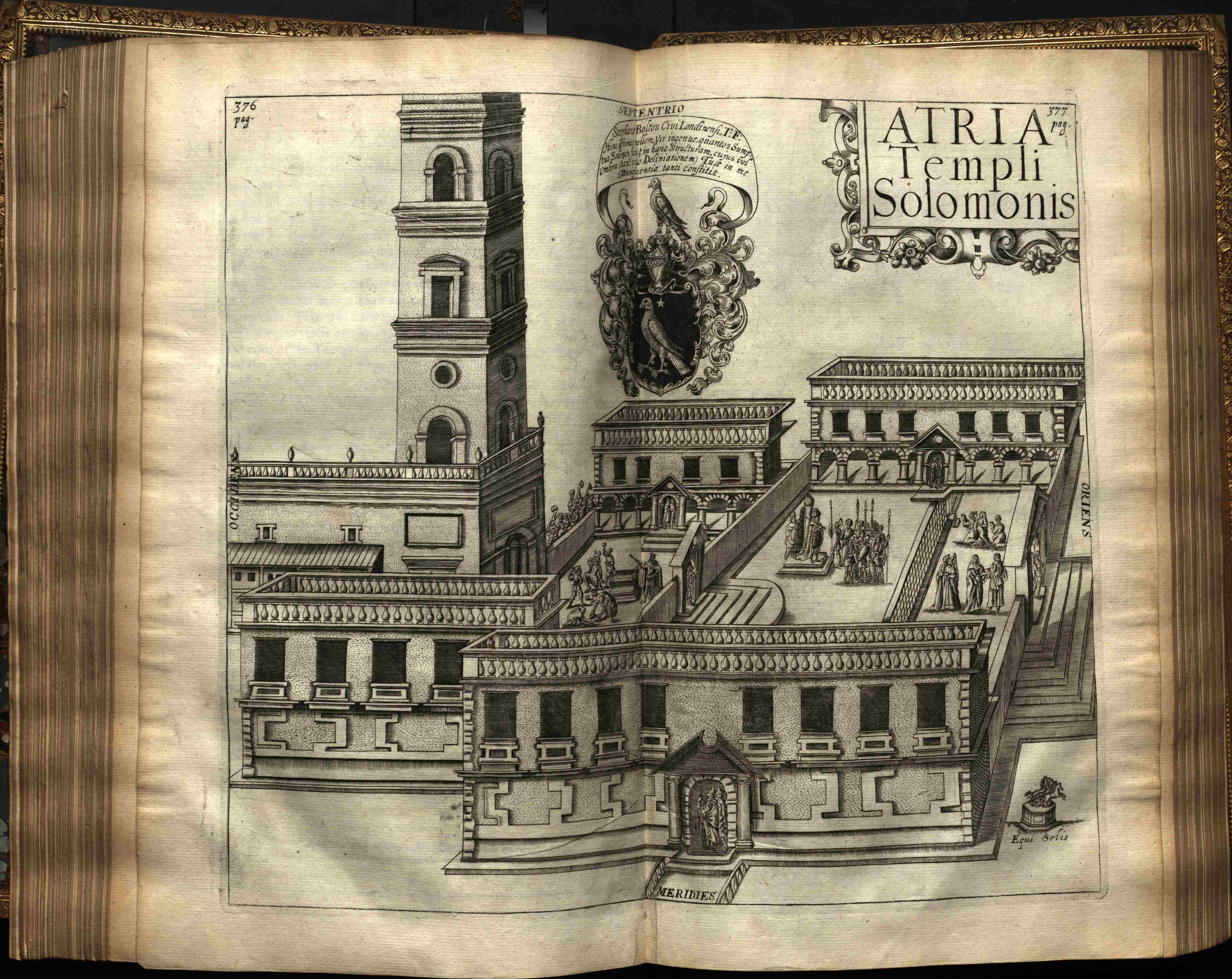
Atria Templi Solominis

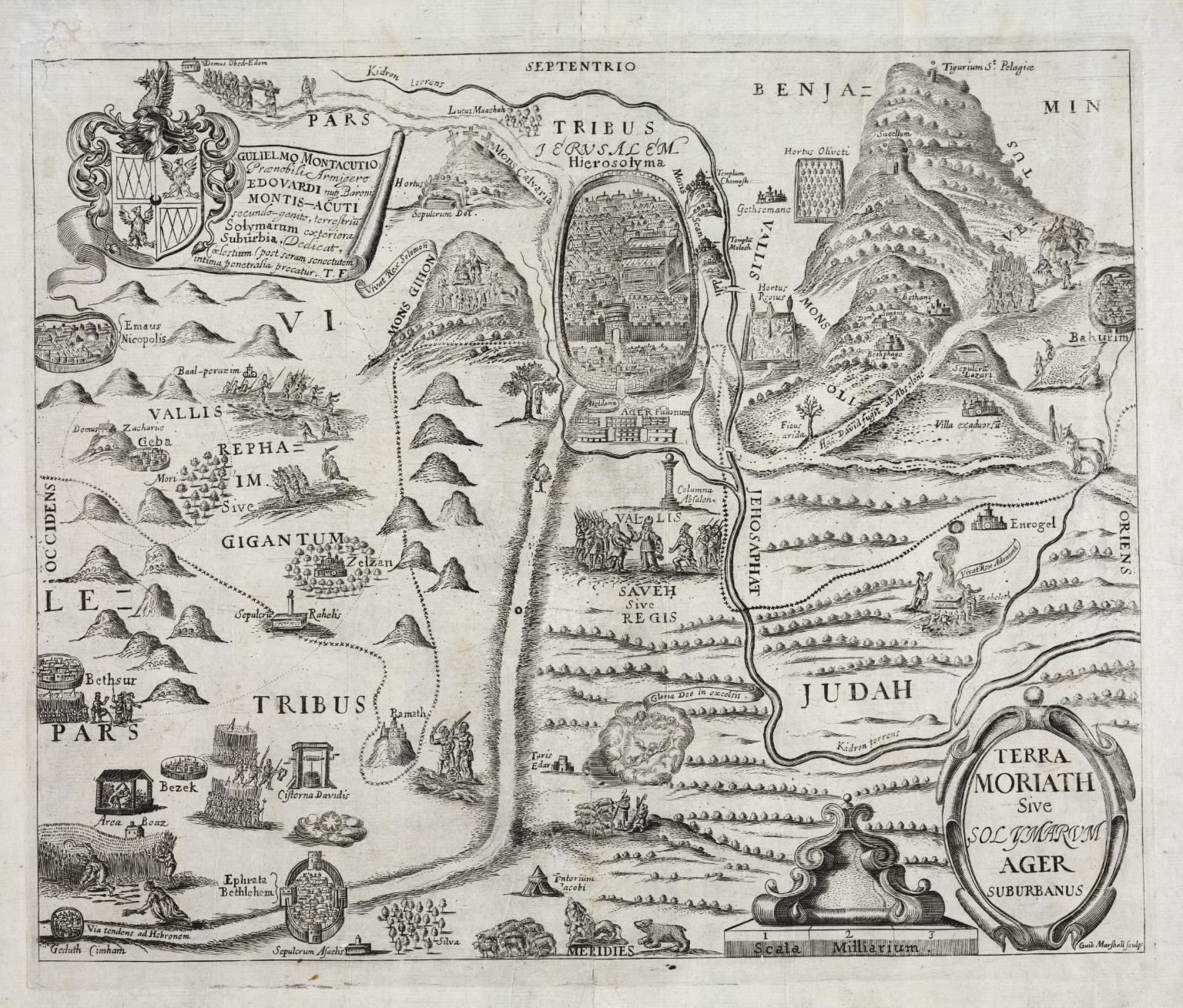
Terra Moriath

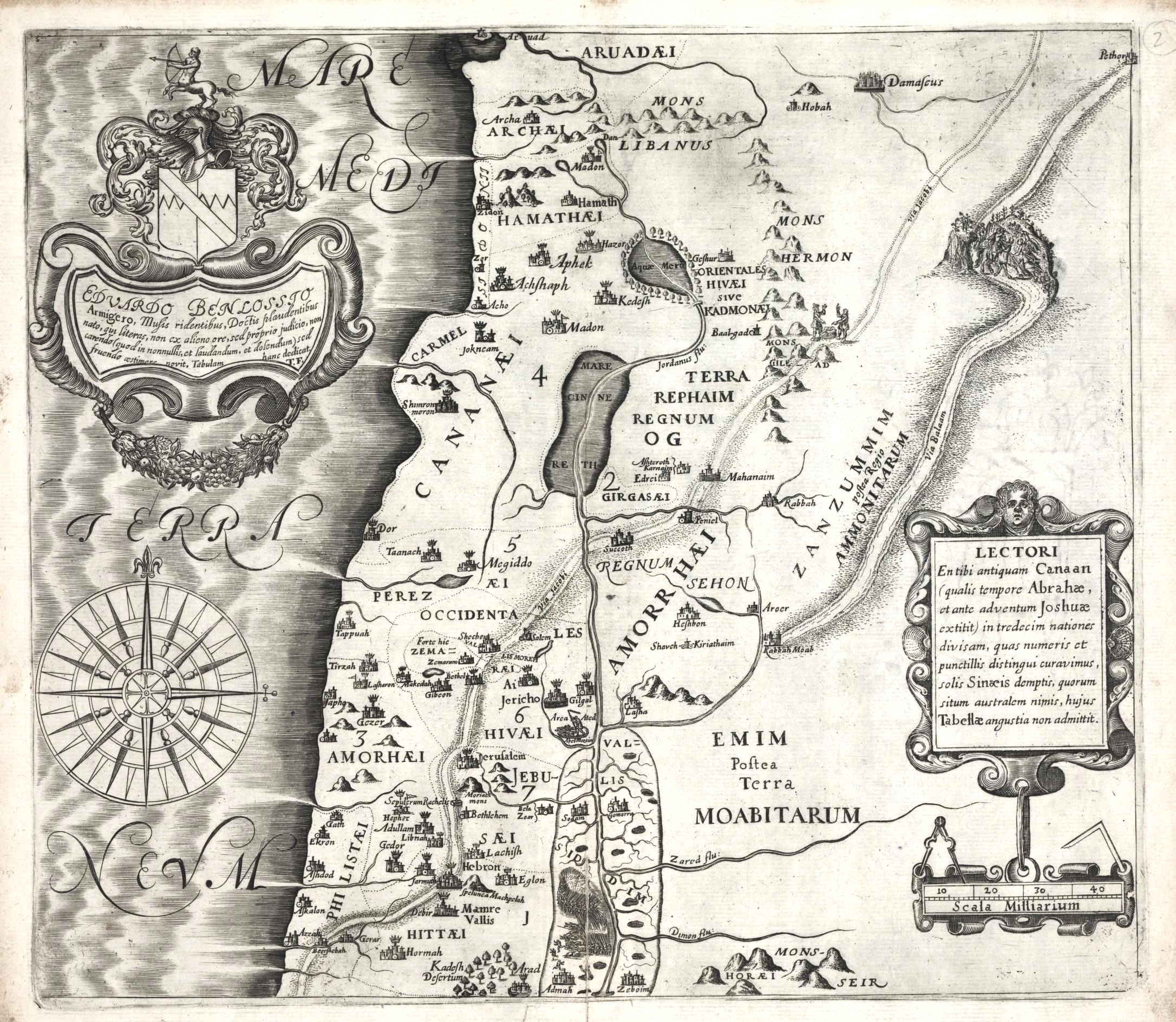
Terra Canaan

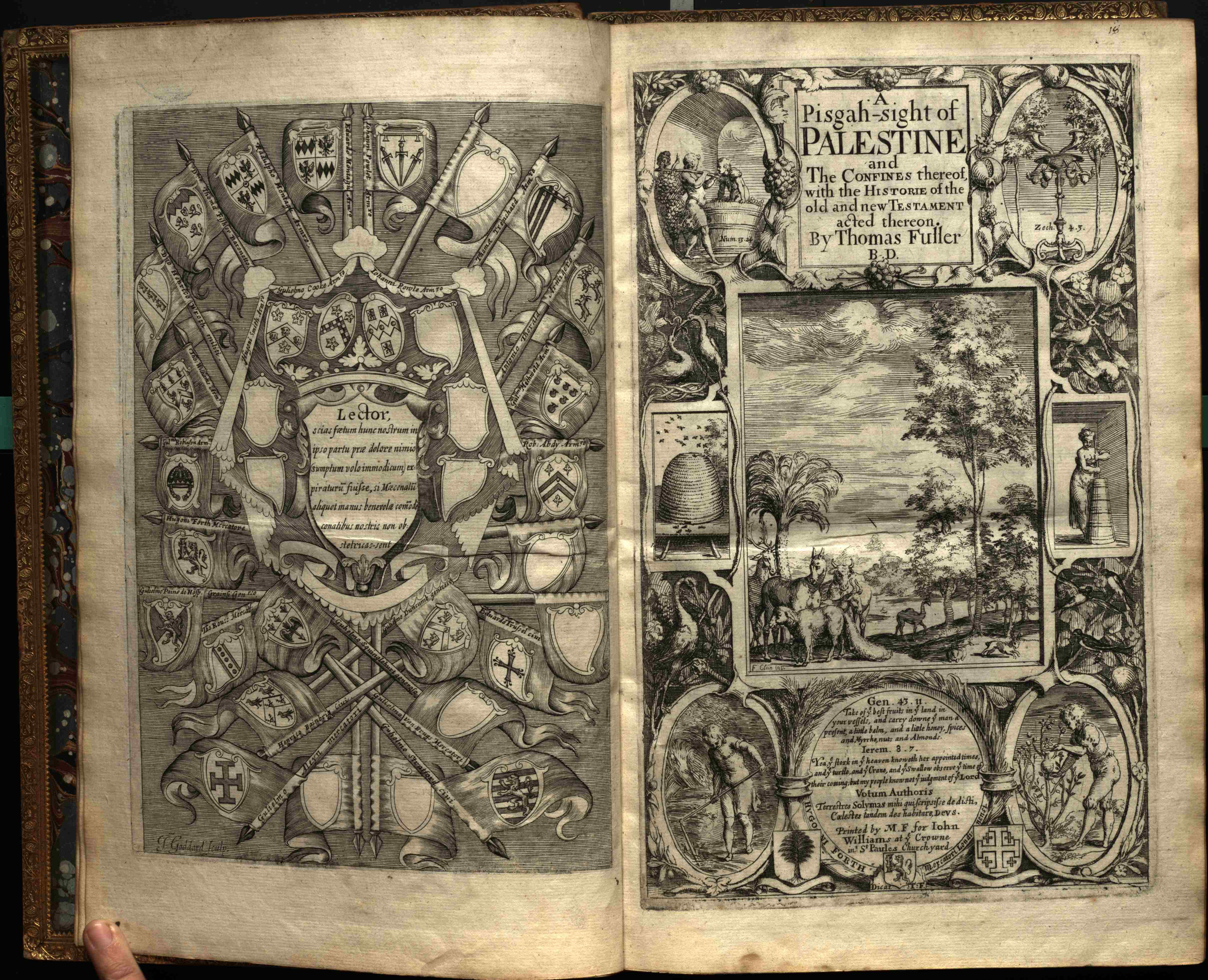
Pisgah-sight of Palestine

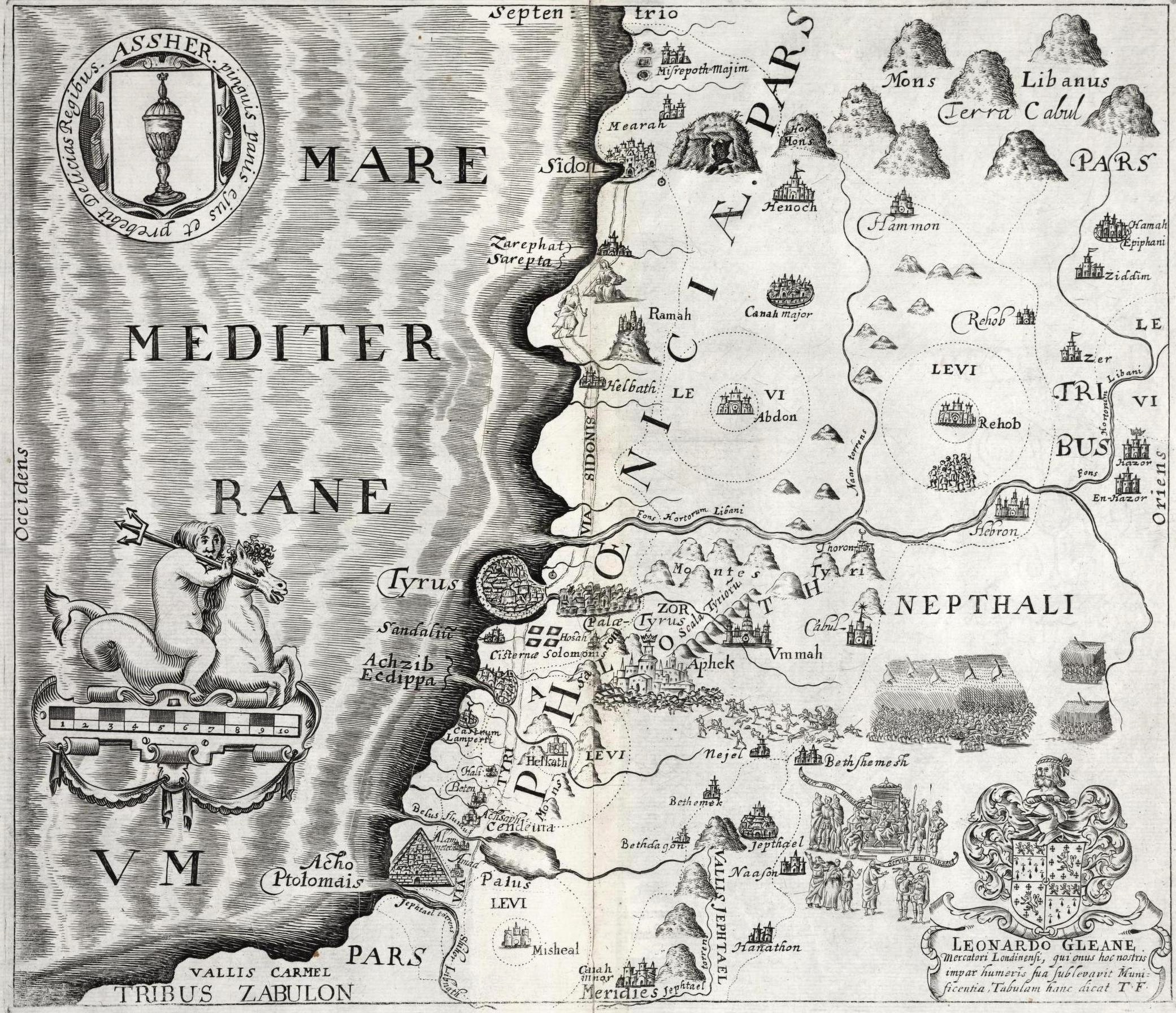
Tribe of Asher

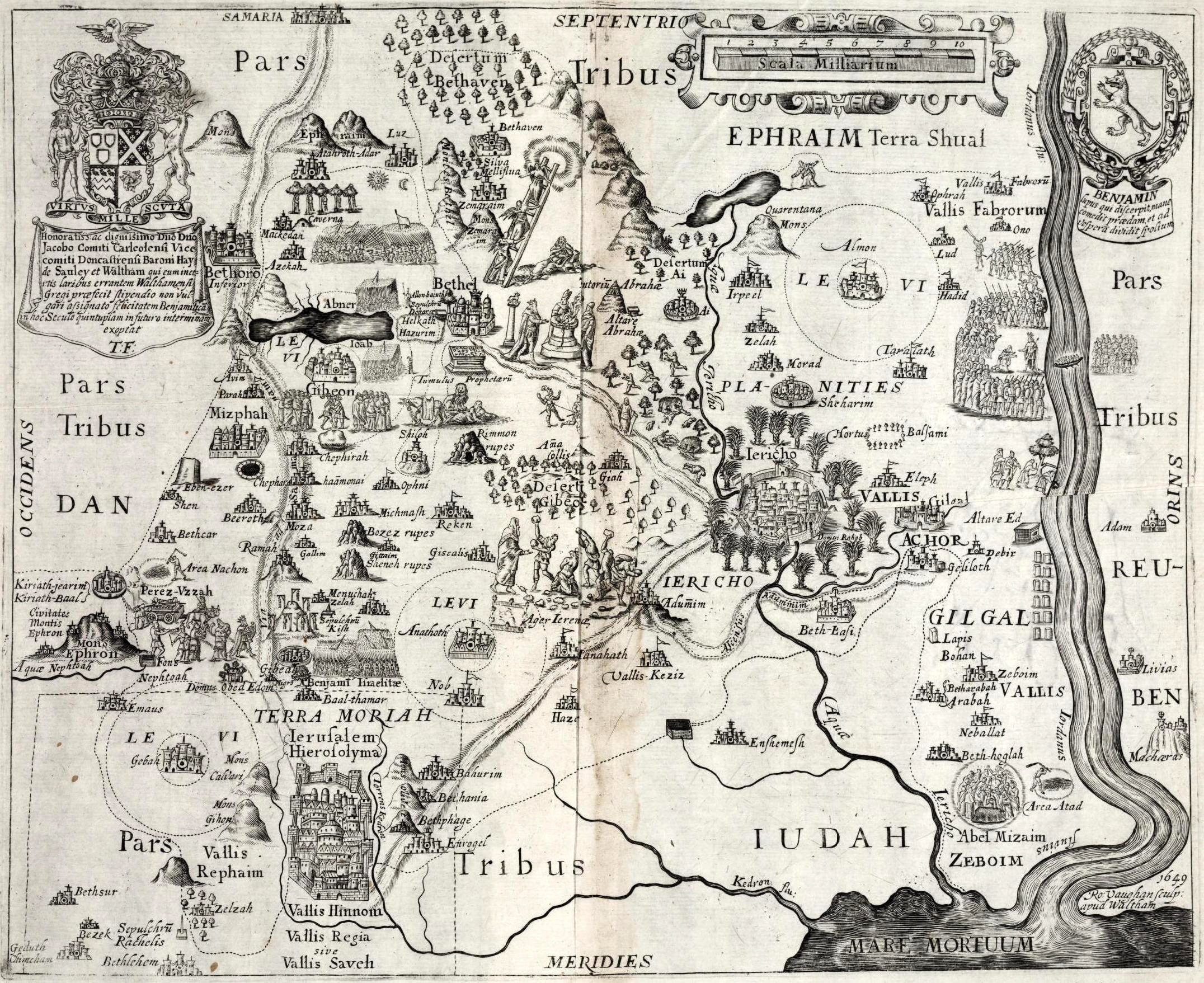
Tribe of Benjamin

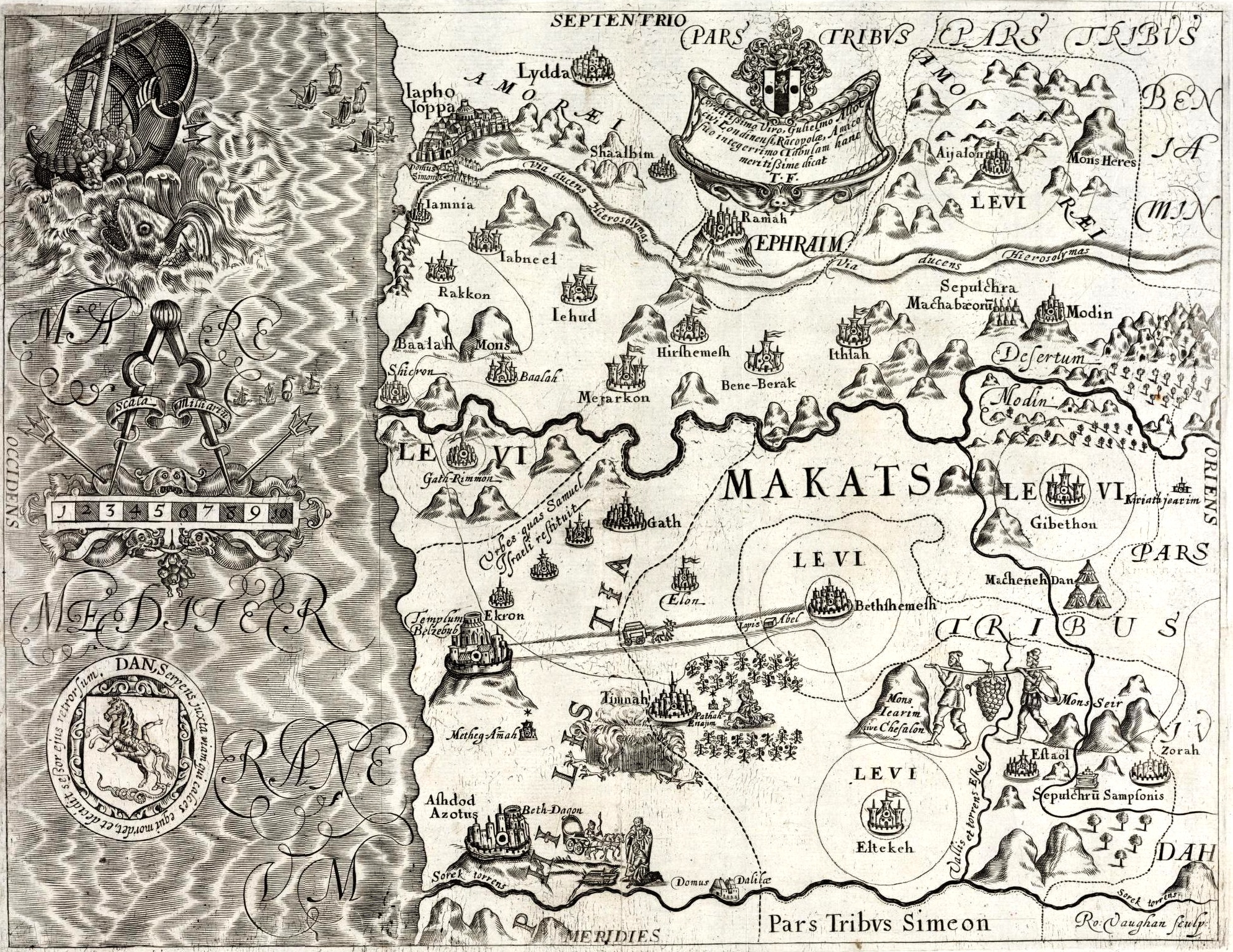
Tribe of Dan

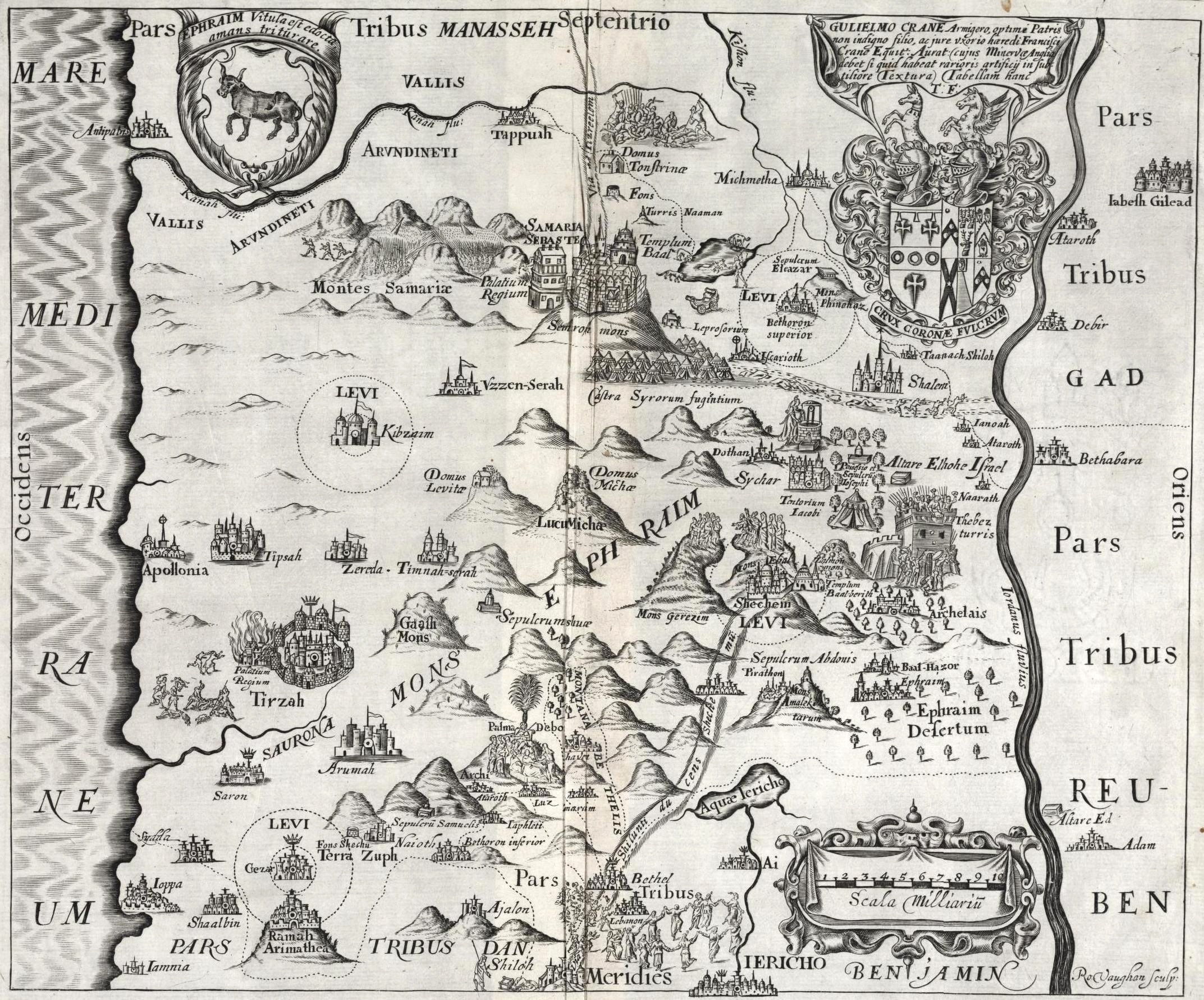
Tribe of Ephraim

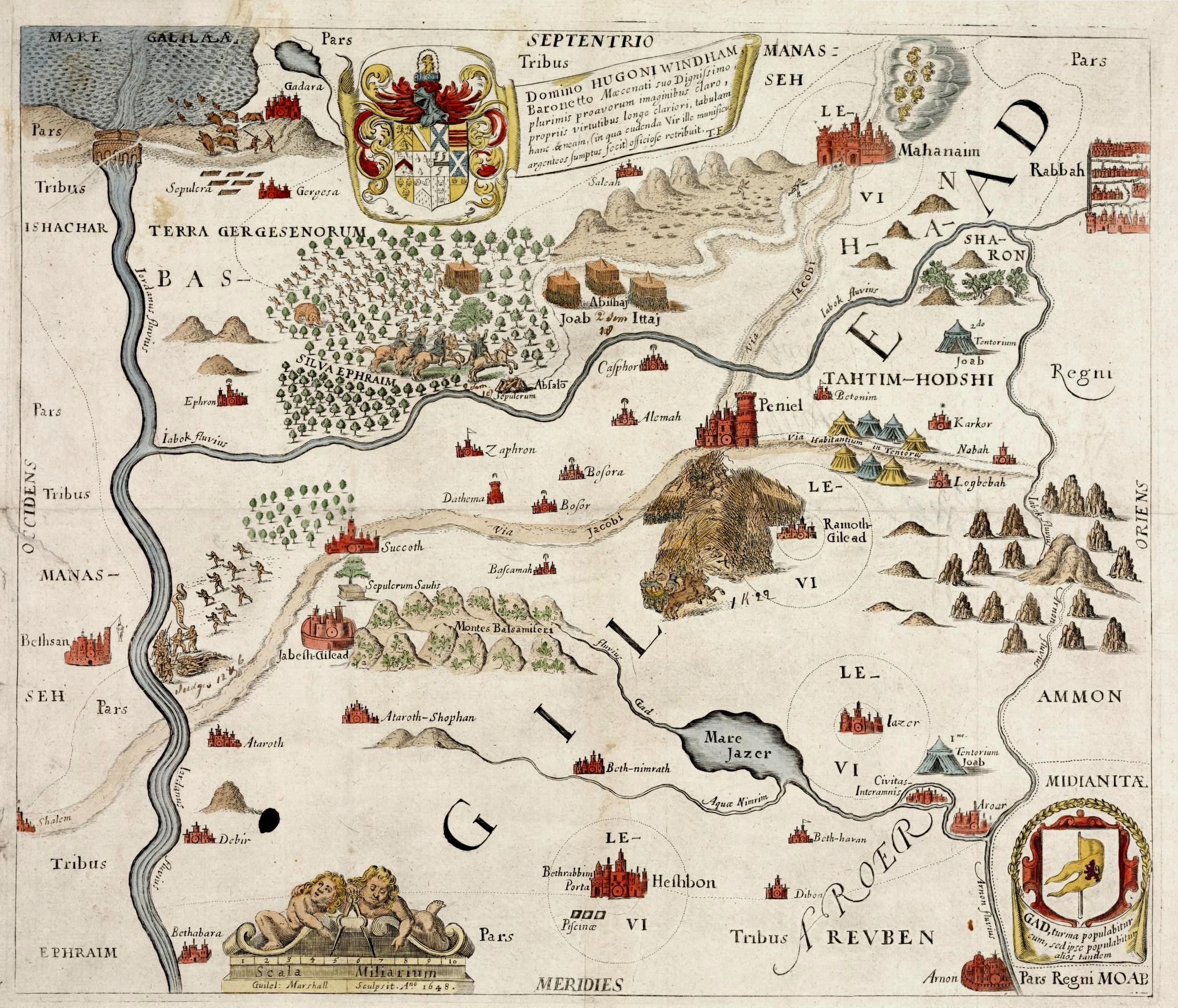
Tribe of Gad

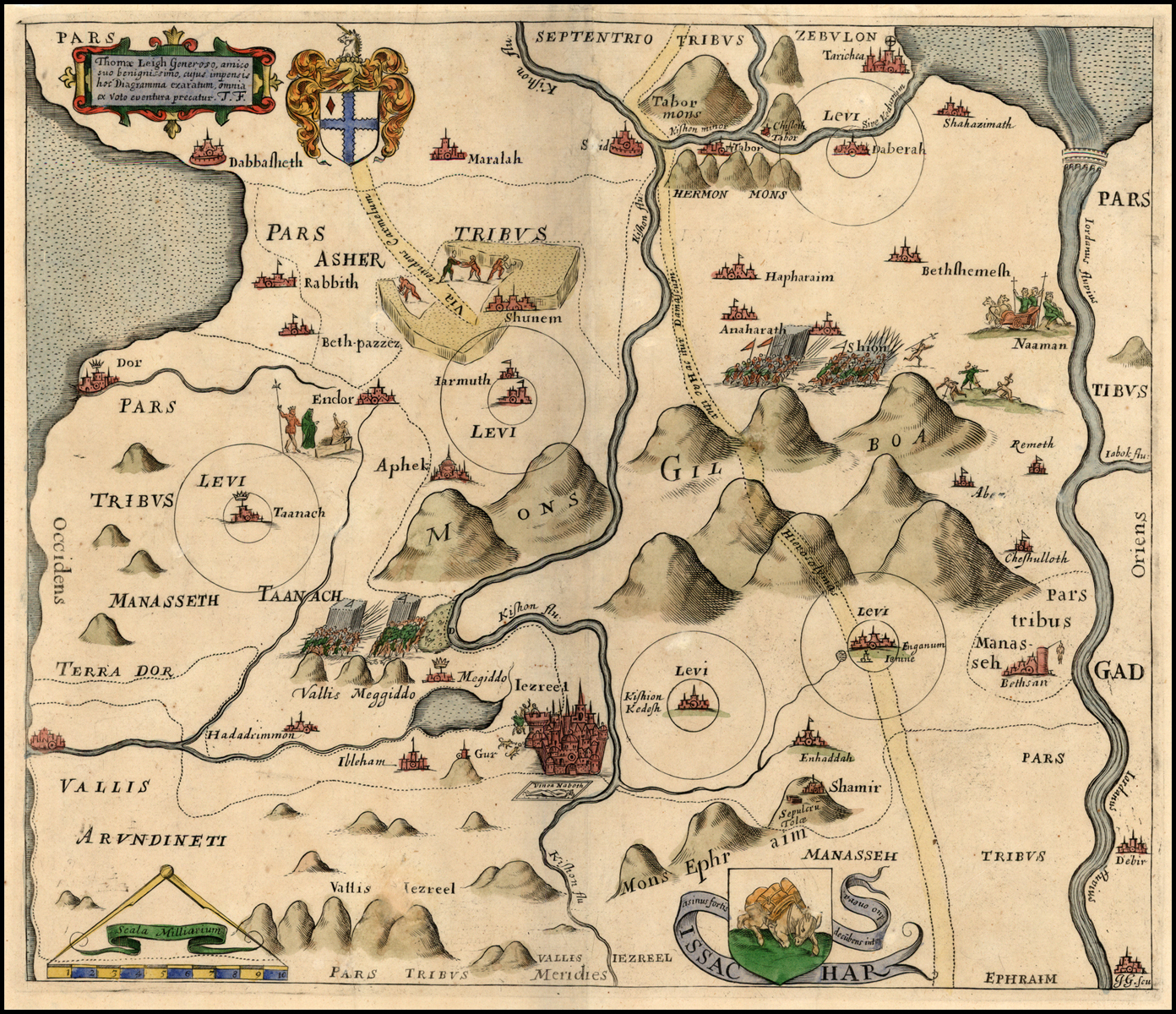
Tribe of Issacar

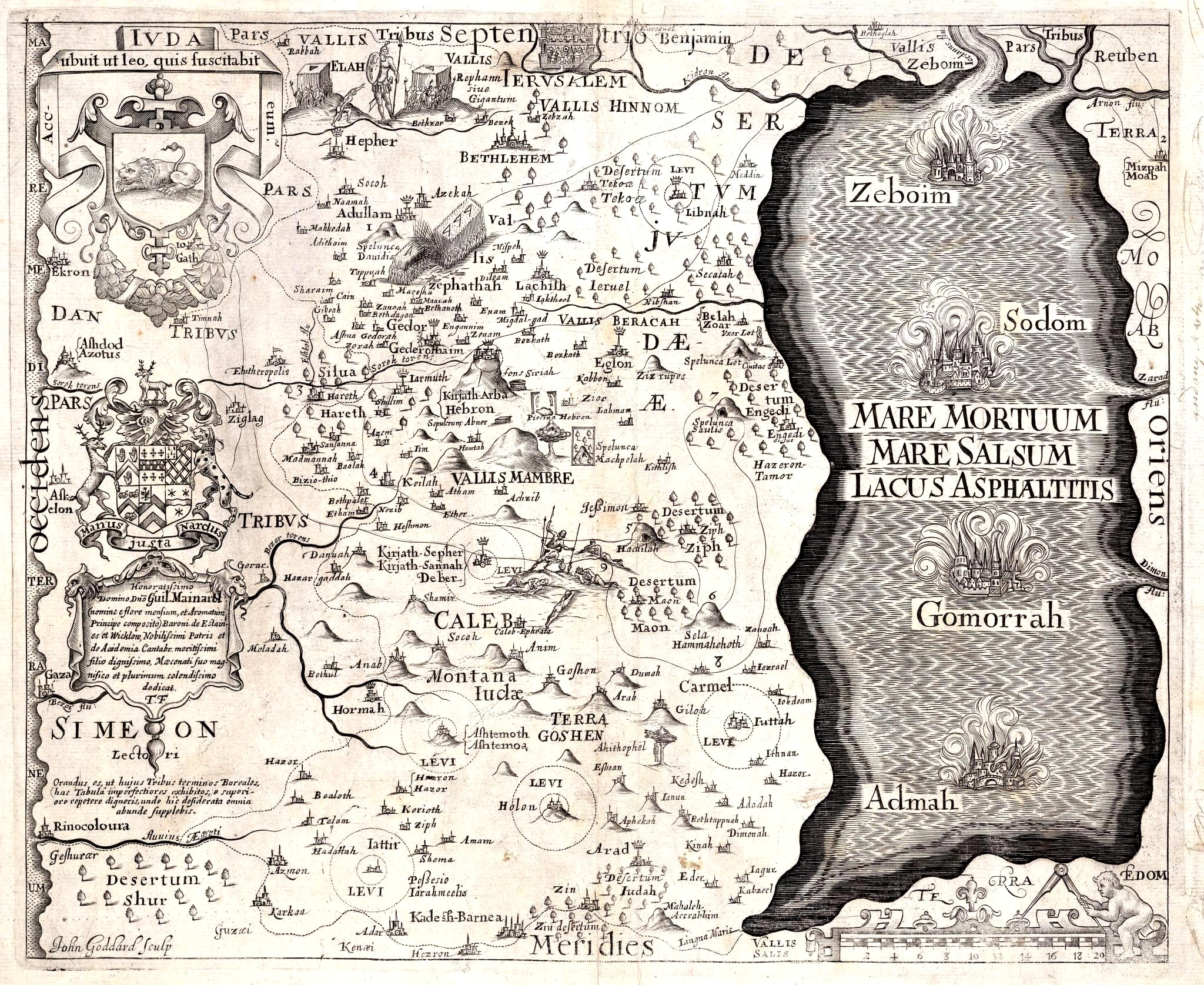
Tribe of Judah

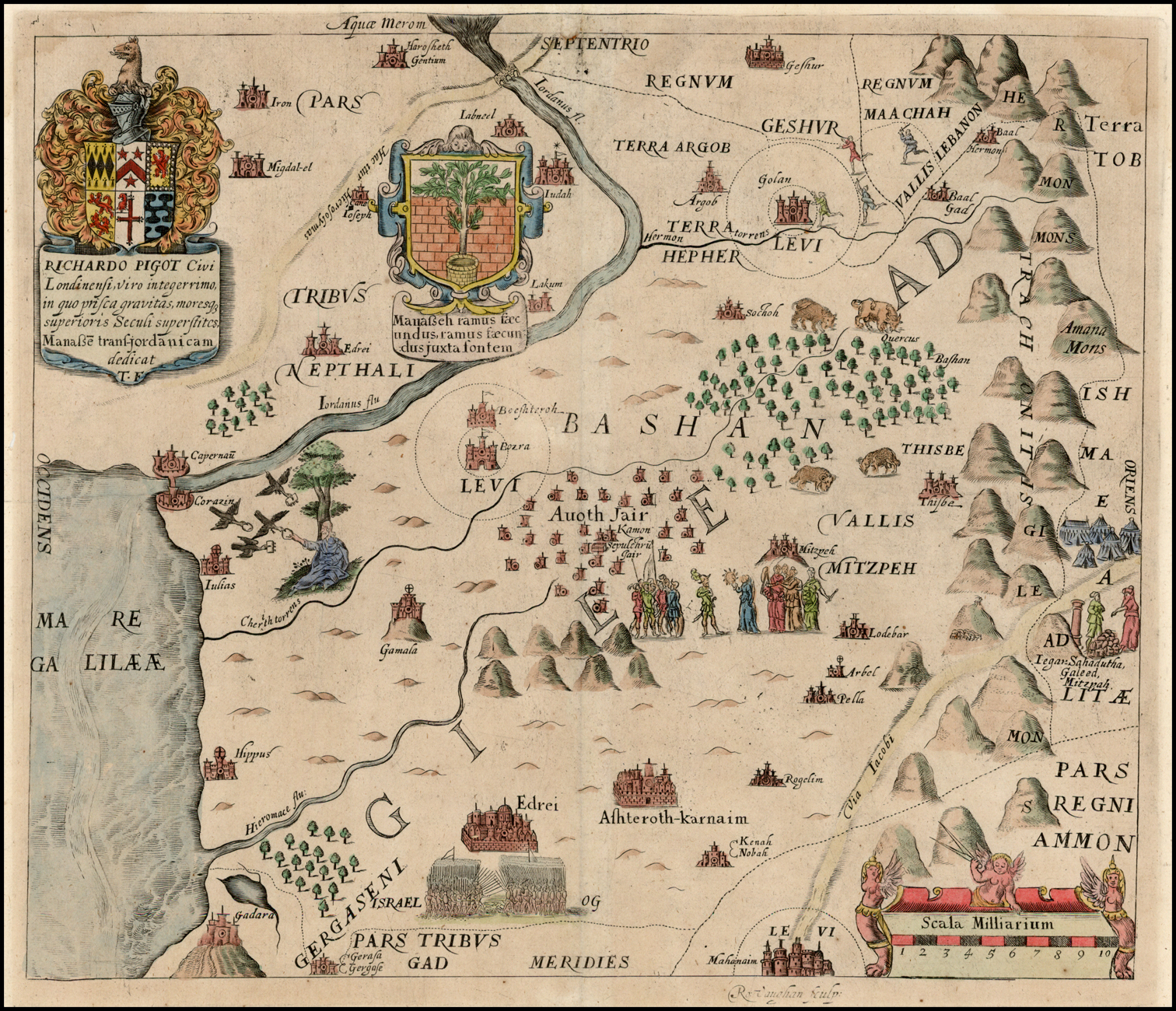
Tribe of Manasse

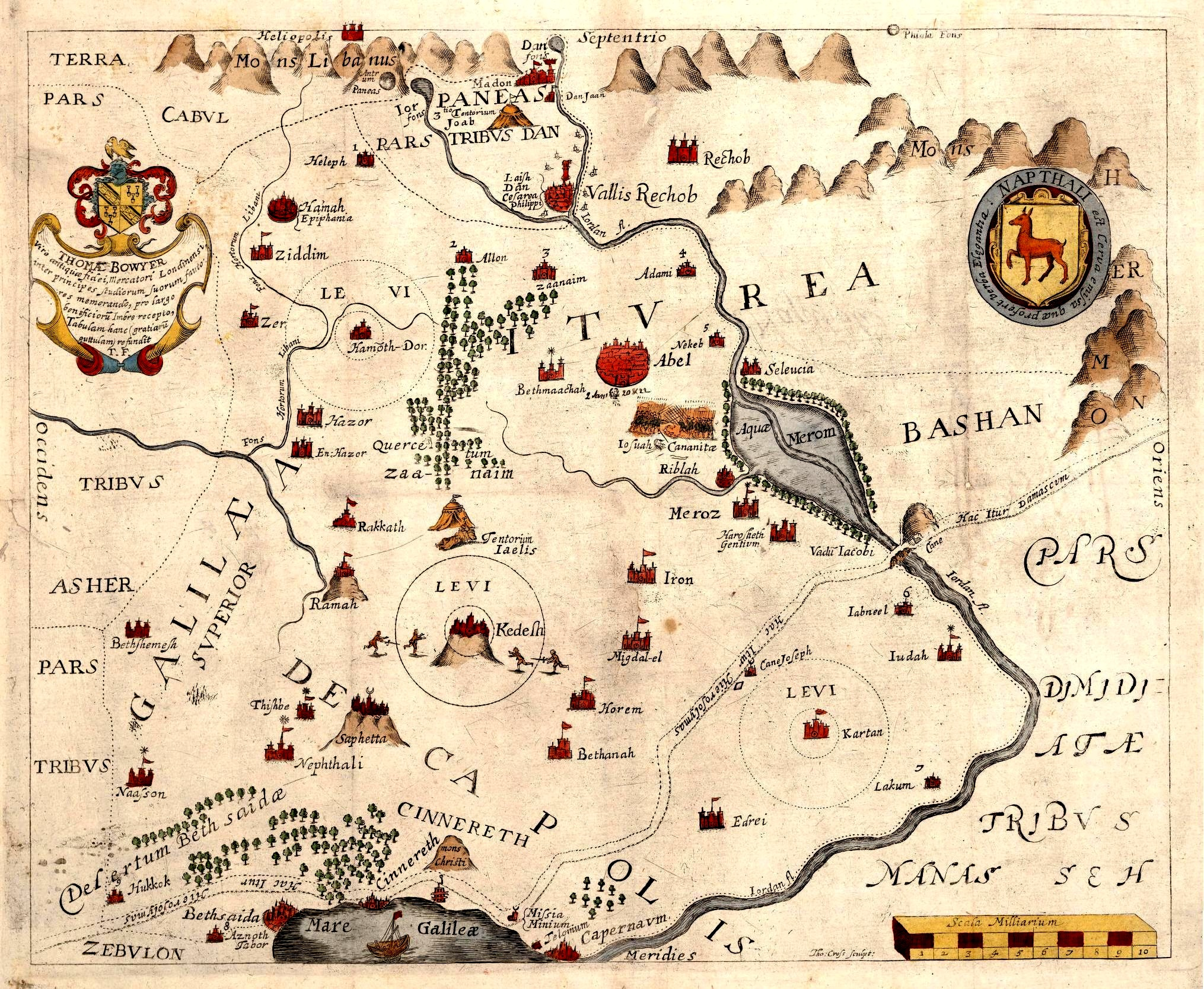
Tribe of Naphtali

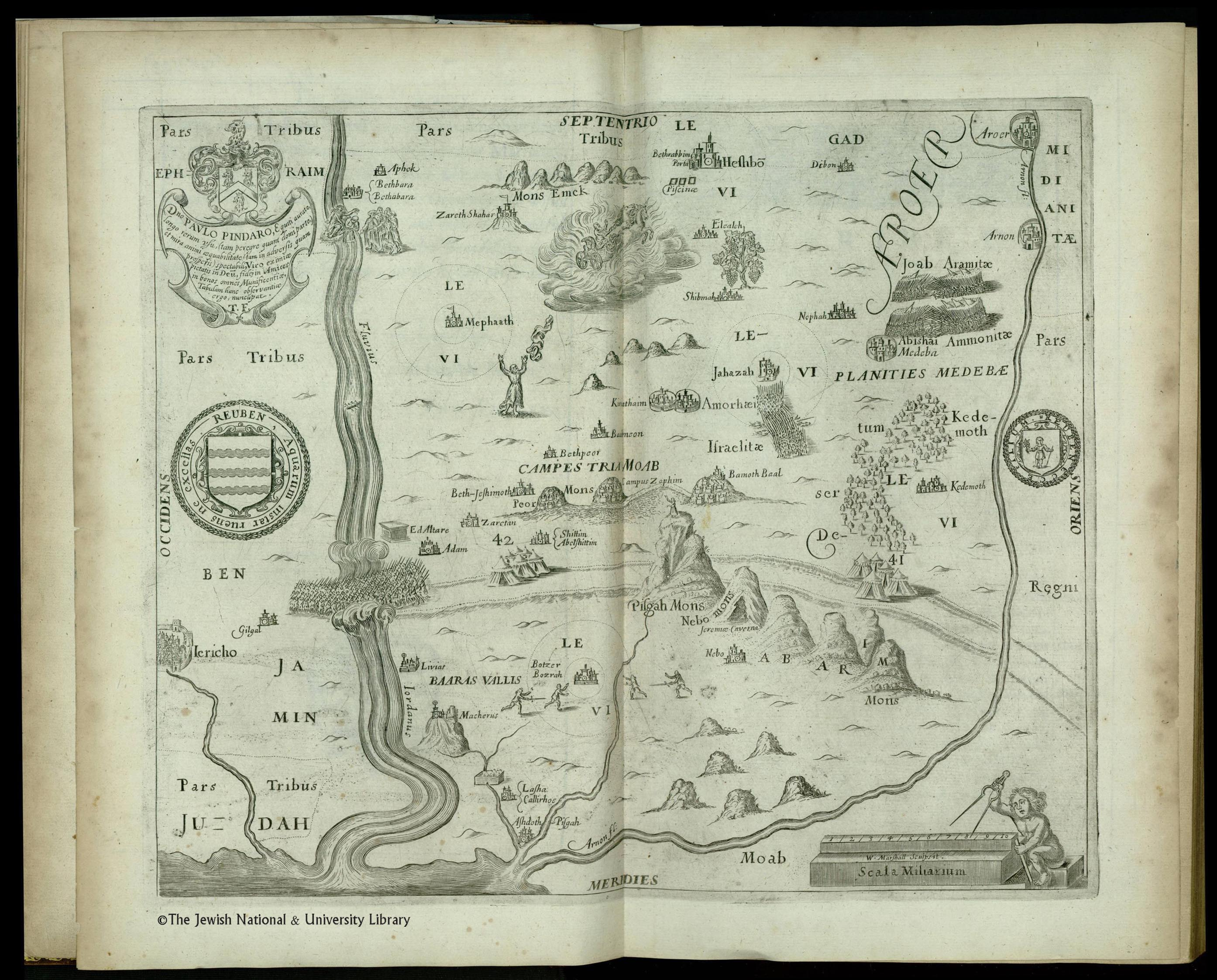
Tribe of Reuben

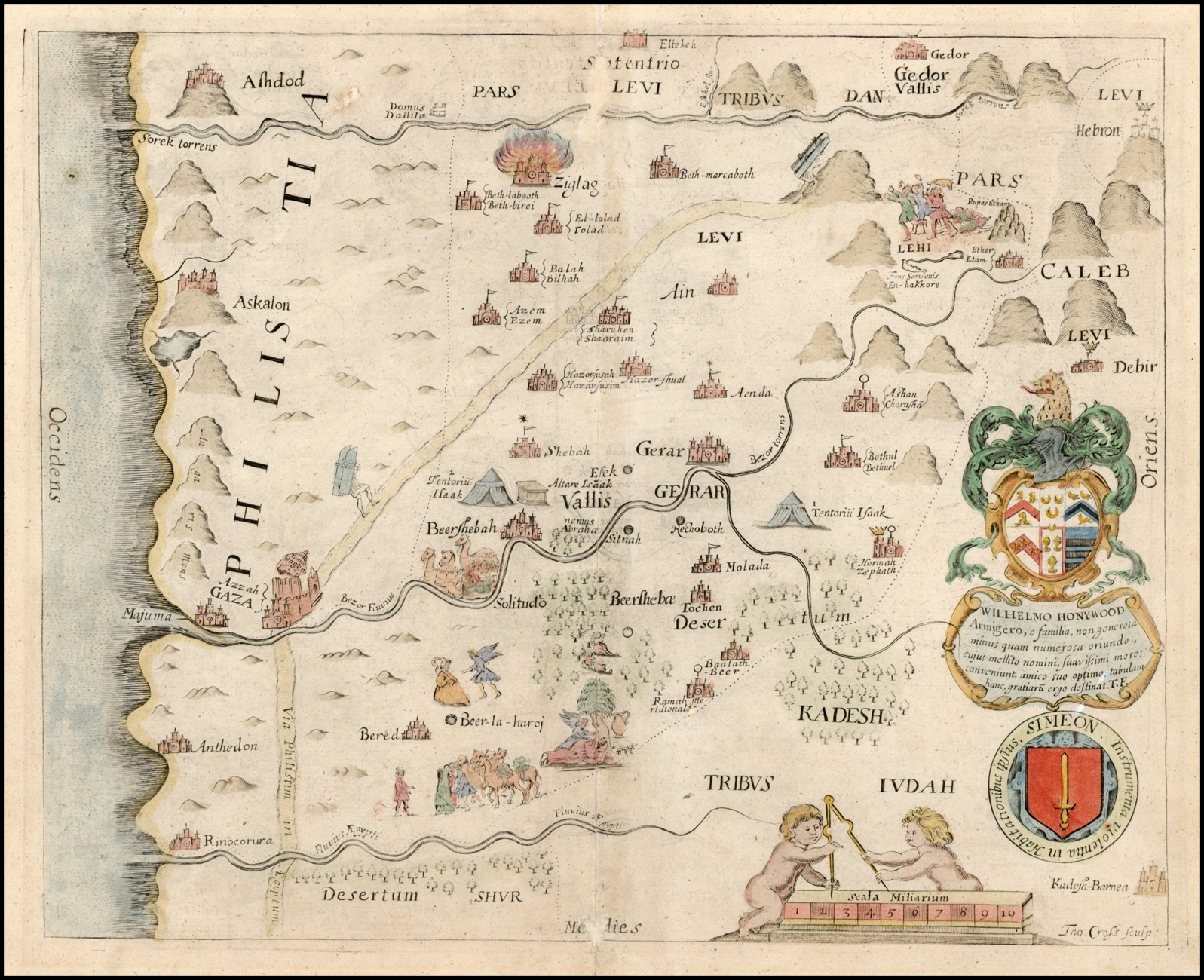
Tribe of Simeon

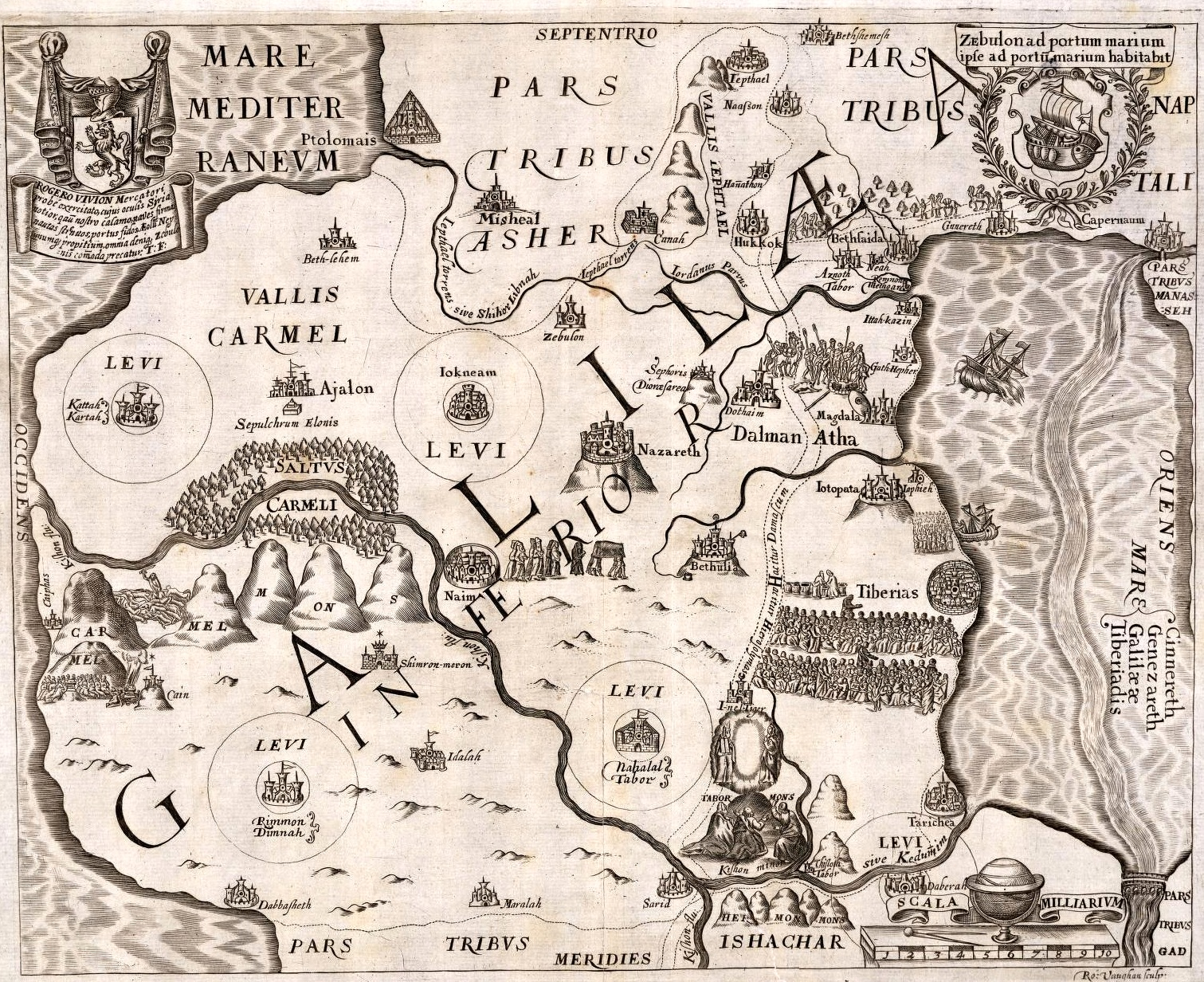
Tribe of Zebulon

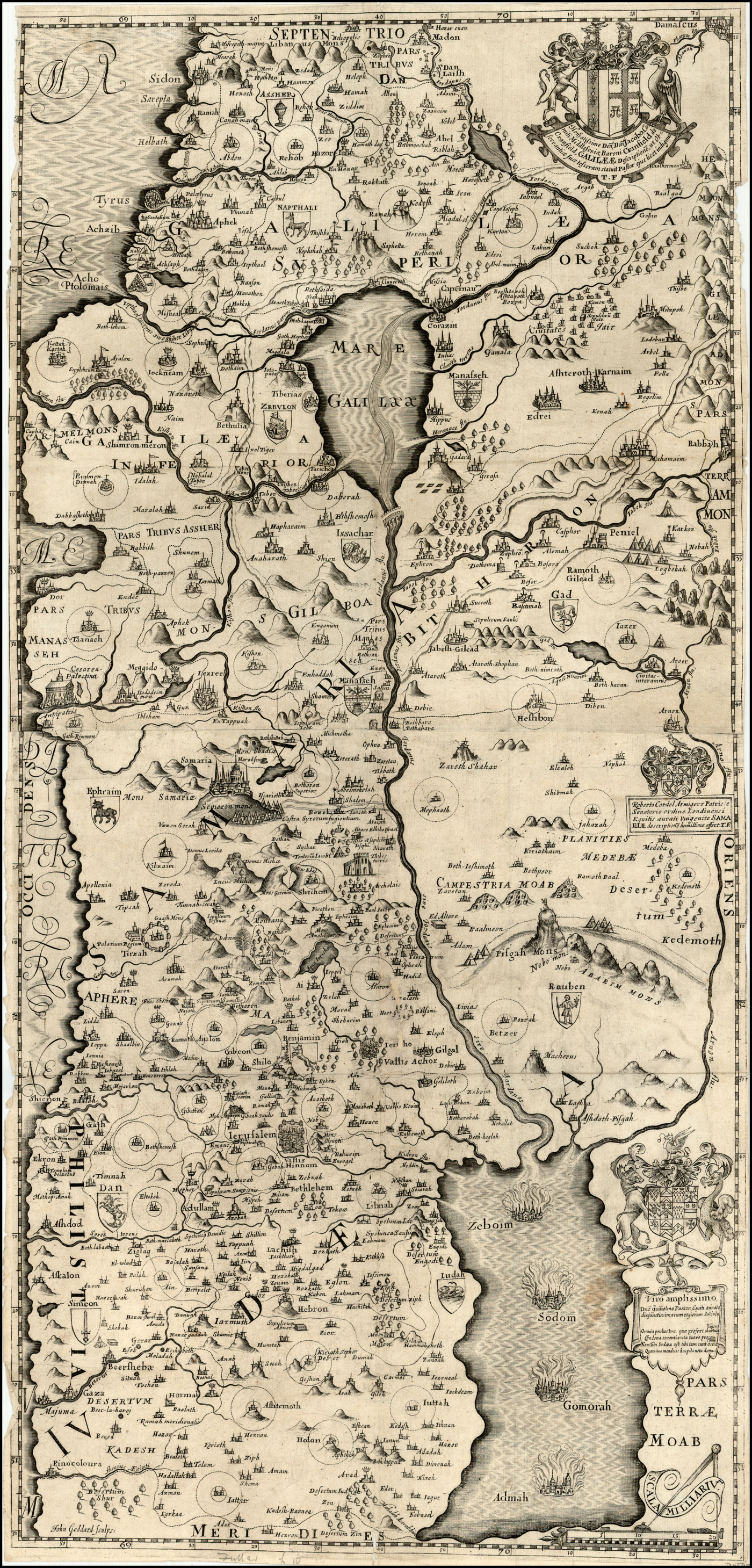
Terra Canaan and Tribes

== Reception ==
Fuller's sense of humour kept him from extremes. "By his particular temper and management", said Laurence Echard in his History of England, "he weathered the late great storm with more success than many other great men". He was known as "a perfect walking library". Antithetic and axiomatic sentences abound in his pages. "Wit," wrote Coleridge after reading the Church History, "was the stuff and substance of Fuller's intellect". Charles Lamb made some selections from Fuller, and admired his "golden works." American essayist Samuel McChord Crothers devoted a chapter of his 1916 book The Pleasures of an Absentee Landlord to an appreciation of Fuller and of the genial spirit of Fuller's prose, writing that

Fuller retains the intimate tone of one who is in a little circle of friends. There is no attempt at the impartial dignity of history. If he tells what happens, he takes it for granted that we should like to know what he thinks about it.

== Family ==
In about 1640 Fuller married Eleanor, daughter of Hugh Grove of Chisenbury, Wiltshire. She died in 1641. Their son, John, baptised at Broadwindsor by his father on 6 June 1641, was afterwards of Sidney Sussex College, Cambridge, saw his father's Worthies of England through the press in 1662, and became rector of Great Wakering, Essex, where he died in 1687.

About 1652 Fuller married his second wife, Mary Roper, youngest sister of Thomas Roper, 1st Viscount Baltinglass, by whom he had several children.
