= Richard Lovelace (poet) =

English writer and poet (1617–1658)

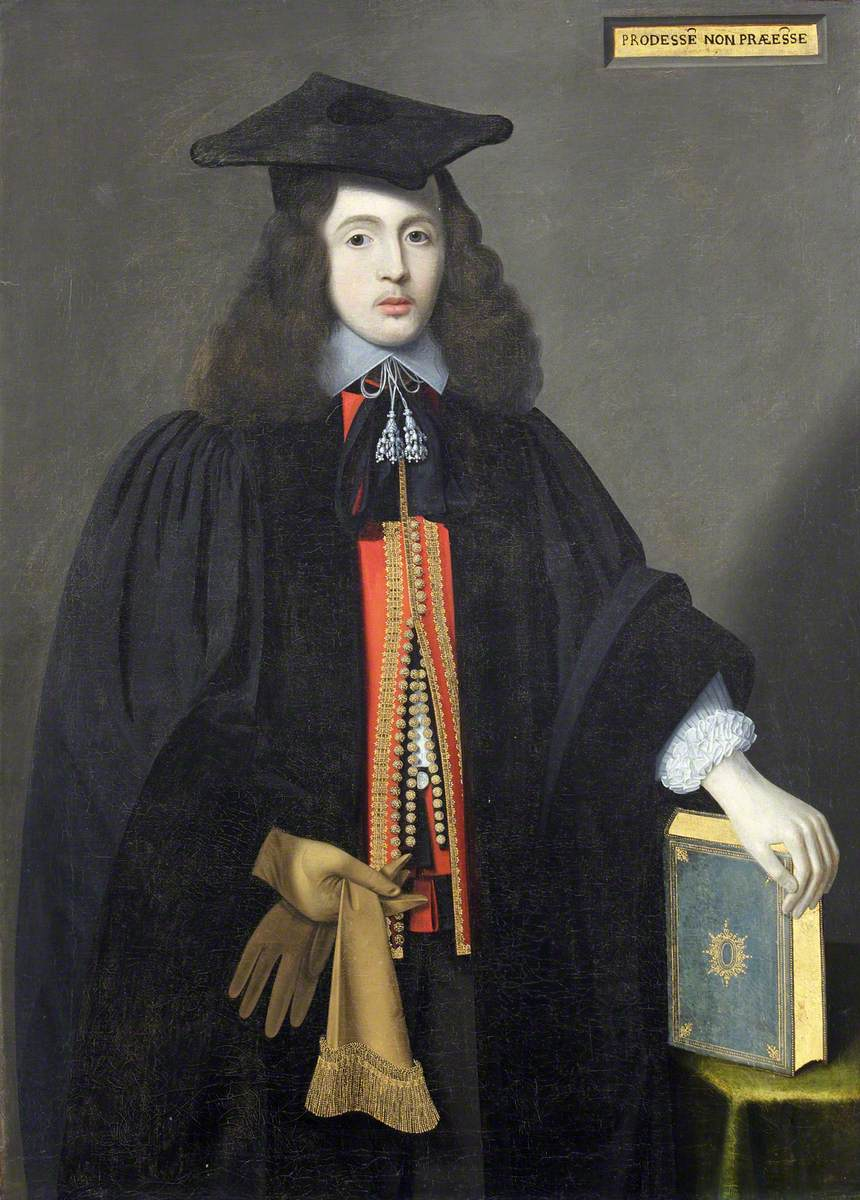
- Richard Lovelace
- Born: 9 December 1617
- Died: 1657 (aged 39–40); London, England
- Education: Gloucester Hall, Oxford
- Occupation: Poet
- Writing career
- Period: Late English Renaissance
- Notable work: To Althea, from Prison
- Literary movement: Cavalier poet

Richard Lovelace (/ˈlʌvləs/, homophone of "loveless"; 9 December 1617 – 1657) was an English poet in the seventeenth century. He was a cavalier poet who fought on behalf of Charles I during the English Civil War. His best known works are "To Althea, from Prison", and "To Lucasta, Going to the Warres".

== Biography ==
=== Early life and family ===
Richard Lovelace was born on 9 December 1617. His exact birthplace is unknown, and may have been Woolwich, Kent, or Holland. He was the oldest son of Sir William Lovelace and Anne Barne Lovelace. He had four brothers and three sisters. His father was from a distinguished military and legal family; the Lovelace family owned a considerable amount of property in Kent.

His father, Sir William Lovelace, was a member of the Virginia Company and an incorporator in the second Virginia Company in 1609. He was a soldier and died during the war with Spain and the Dutch Republic in the Siege of Groenlo (1627) a few days before the town fell. Richard was nine years old when his father died.

Lovelace's father was the son of Sir William Lovelace and Elizabeth Aucher, who was the daughter of Mabel Wroths and Edward Aucher, who inherited, under his father's will, the manors of Bishopsbourne and Hautsborne. Elizabeth's nephew was Sir Anthony Aucher (1614 – 31 May 1692) an English politician and Cavalier during the English Civil War. He was the son of her brother Sir Anthony Aucher and his wife Hester Collett.

Lovelace's mother, Anne Barne (1587–1633), was the daughter of Sir William Barne and the granddaughter of Sir George Barne III (1532–1593), the Lord Mayor of London and a prominent merchant and public official from London during the reign of Elizabeth I and Anne Gerrard, daughter of Sir William Garrard, who was Lord Mayor of London in 1555.

Lovelace's maternal grandmother was Anne Sandys. His great-grandmother was Cicely Wilford and his great-grandfather Most Reverend Dr Edwin Sandys, an Anglican church leader who successively held the posts of Bishop of Worcester (1559–1570), Bishop of London (1570–1576), and Archbishop of York (1576–1588) and was one of the translators of the Bishops' Bible.

His mother, Anne Barne Lovelace, married as her second husband, on 20 January 1630, at Greenwich, England, the Very Rev Dr Jonathan Browne. They were the parents of one child, Anne Browne, Richard's half-sister, who married Herbert Croft, later Bishop of Hereford, and was the mother of Sir Herbert Croft, the first of the Croft baronets.

Lovelace's brother, Francis Lovelace (1621–1675), was the second governor of the New York Colony appointed by the Duke of York, later King James II of England. They were also great nephews of both George Sandys (2 March 1577 – March 1644), an English traveller, colonist and poet; and of Sir Edwin Sandys (9 December 1561 – October 1629), an English statesman and one of the founders of the London Company.

In 1629, when Lovelace was eleven, he went to Sutton's Foundation at Charterhouse School, then in London. There is no clear record that Lovelace actually attended; it is believed that he studied as a "boarder" because he did not need financial assistance like the "scholars". He spent five years at Charterhouse, three of which were spent with Richard Crashaw, who also became a poet. On 5 May 1631, Lovelace was sworn in as a Gentleman Wayter Extraordinary to King Charles I, an honorary position for which one paid a fee. He went on to Gloucester Hall, Oxford, in 1634.

== Collegiate career ==
Lovelace attended the University of Oxford and was praised by his contemporary Anthony Wood as "the most amiable and beautiful person that ever eye beheld; a person also of innate modesty, virtue and courtly deportment, which made him then, but especially after, when he retired to the great city, much admired and adored by the female sex".

While at college, he tried to portray himself more as a social connoisseur than as a scholar, continuing his image of being a Cavalier. Being a Cavalier poet, Lovelace wrote to praise a friend or fellow poet, to give advice in grief or love, to define a relationship, to articulate the precise amount of attention a man owes a woman, to celebrate beauty, and to persuade to love. Lovelace wrote a comedy, The Scholars, while at Oxford. He then left for the University of Cambridge for a few months, where he met Lord Goring, who led him into political trouble.

At the age of eighteen he was granted the degree of Master of Arts at Oxford University.

== Politics and prison ==
Lovelace's poetry was often influenced by his experiences with politics and association with important figures of his time. At the age of nineteen he contributed a verse to a volume of elegies commemorating Princess Katharine. In 1639 Lovelace joined the regiment of Lord Goring, serving first as a senior ensign and later as a captain in the Bishops' Wars. This experience inspired "Sonnet. To Generall Goring", the poem "To Lucasta, Going to the Warres" and the tragedy The Soldier. On his return to his home in Kent in 1640, Lovelace served as a country gentleman and a justice of the peace, encountering civil turmoil over religion and politics.

In 1641, Lovelace led a group of men to seize and destroy a petition for the abolition of Episcopal rule, which had been signed by 15,000 people. The following year he presented the House of Commons with Dering's pro-Royalist petition which was supposed to have been burned. These actions resulted in Lovelace's first imprisonment. He was shortly released on bail, with the stipulation that he avoid communication with the House of Commons without permission. This prevented Lovelace, who had done everything to prove himself during the Bishops' Wars, from participating in the first phase of the English Civil War. This first experience of imprisonment brought him to write one of his best known lyrics, "To Althea, from Prison", in which he illustrates his noble and paradoxical nature. Lovelace did everything he could to remain in the king's favour despite his inability to participate in the war.

During the political chaos of 1648 he was again imprisoned, this time for nearly a year. When he was released in April 1649, the king had been executed and Lovelace's cause seemed lost. As in his previous incarceration, this experience led to creative production—this time in the cause of spiritual freedom, as reflected in the release of his first volume of poetry, Lucasta. "Lucasta" was Lovelace's Muse, thought to be Lucy Sacheverell.

Lovelace died in 1657 and was buried in St Bride's Church in Fleet Street in the City of London.

== Literature ==
From the time Richard Lovelace started writing while he was a student at Oxford he wrote almost 200 poems. His first work was a drama, The Scholars, never published but performed at college and then in London. In 1640, he wrote a tragedy, The Soldier based on his military experience. When serving in the Bishops' Wars, he wrote the sonnet "To Generall Goring", a poem of Bacchanalian celebration rather than a glorification of military action. "To Lucasta, Going to the Warres", written in 1640, concerned his first political action. "To Althea, From Prison" was written during his first imprisonment in 1642. Later that year, during his travels to Holland with General Goring, he wrote The Rose, followed by The Scrutiny. On 14 May 1649, Lucasta was published. He also wrote poems on animal life: The Ant, The Grasse-hopper, The Snayl, The Falcon, The Toad and Spyder. In 1660, after Lovelace died, Lucasta: Postume Poems was published; it contains A Mock-Song, which has a darker tone than his previous works.

William Winstanley thought highly of Lovelace's work and compared him to an idol: "I can compare no Man so like this Colonel Lovelace as Sir Philip Sidney" of which it is in an Epitaph made of him;

Nor is it fit that more I should aquaint
Lest Men adore in one
A Scholar, Souldier, Lover, and a Saint

His most quoted excerpts are from the beginning of the last stanza of "To Althea, From Prison":

Stone walls do not a prison make,
Nor iron bars a cage;
Minds innocent and quiet take
That for an hermitage

and the end of "To Lucasta. Going to the Warres":

I could not love thee, dear, so much,
Lov'd I not Honour more.

== Chronology ==
- 1617 – On 9 December, Richard Lovelace is born, either in Woolwich, Kent, or in Holland.
- 1629 – King Charles I nominated "Thomas [probably Richard] Lovelace", upon petition of Lovelace's mother, Anne Barne Lovelace, to Sutton's foundation at Charterhouse.
- 1631 – On 5 May, Lovelace is made "Gentleman Wayter Extraordinary" to the King.
- 1634 – On 27 June, he matriculates as Gentleman Commoner at Gloucester Hall, Oxford.
- 1635 – Writes a comedy, The Scholars.
- 1636 – On 31 August, the degree of M.A. is presented to him.
- 1637 – On 4 October, he enters Cambridge University.
- 1638–1639 – His first printed poems appear: An Elegy on Princess Catherine, the daughter of Charles I; prefaces to several books.
- 1639 – He is senior ensign in General Goring's regiment – in the First Scottish Expedition. Sonnet to Goring
- 1640 – Commissioned captain in the Second Scottish Expedition; writes a tragedy, The Soldier (unperformed, unpublished and lost) and the poem "To Lucasta, Going to the Warres". He then returns home at 21, into the possession of his family's property.
- 1641 – Lovelace tears up a pro-Parliament, anti-Episcopacy petition at a meeting in Maidstone, Kent.
- 1642 – 30 April, he presents the anti-Parliamentary Petition of Kent and is imprisoned at Gatehouse. In prison he perhaps writes he writes "To Althea, from Prison" and "To Lucasta, from Prison". After appealing, he is released on bail, 21 June. The Civil war begins on 22 August. In September, he goes to Holland with General Goring. He writes The Rose.
- 1642–1646 – Probably serves in Holland and France with General Goring. He writes "The Scrutiny".
- 1643 – Sells some of his property to Richard Hulse.
- 1646 – In October, he is wounded at Dunkirk, while fighting under the Great Conde against the Spaniards.
- 1647 – He is admitted to the Freedom at the Painters' Company.
- 1648 – On 4 February, Lucasta is licensed at the Stationer's Register. On 9 June, Lovelace is again imprisoned at Peterhouse.
- 1649 – On 9 April, he is released from jail. He then sells the remaining family property and portraits to Richard Hulse. On 14 May, Lucasta: Epodes, Odes, Sonnets, Songs, &c., to which is added Aramantha, A Pastoral is published.
- 1650–1657 – Lovelace's whereabouts unknown, though various poems are written.
- 1657 – Lovelace dies in London.
- 1659–1660 – Lucasta, Postume Poems is published.

== Depictions ==
His life was dramatised in the Australian radio play Lovelace.
