= Viscount Dungannon =

Irish title of peerage

Arms of Trevor: Party per bend sinister ermine and ermines, a lion rampant or

Viscount Dungannon is a title that has been created twice in the Peerage of Ireland. The first creation came in 1662 when Marcus Trevor was made Baron Trevor, of Rostrevor in the County of Down, and Viscount Dungannon. These titles became extinct on the death of the third Viscount in 1706.

The Trevor estates, including Brynkinallt (Welsh: Bryncunallt) near Chirk, Denbighshire, Wales, passed to the late Viscount Dungannon's kinsman Arthur Hill, who assumed the additional surname of Trevor in 1759. He was the son of Michael Hill and Anne Trevor, daughter of Sir John Trevor and granddaughter of John Trevor, half-brother of Marcus Trevor, 1st Viscount Dungannon. Arthur Hill-Trevor's brother was Trevor Hill, 1st Viscount Hillsborough, from whom the Marquesses of Downshire descend. On 17 February 1766, Arthur Hill-Trevor was created Baron Hill, of Olderfleet, and Viscount Dungannon, in the Peerage of Ireland. This creation of the viscountcy of Dungannon became extinct on the death of the first holder's great-grandson, the third Viscount, in 1862.

The Dungannon estates, including Brynkinallt, passed to the latter's kinsman Lord Edwin Hill, third son of the third Marquess of Downshire, who assumed the additional surname of Trevor and was created Baron Trevor of Brynkinallt in the County of Denbigh, in 1890 (see Baron Trevor for more information).

== Viscounts Dungannon, first creation (1662) ==
- Marcus Trevor, 1st Viscount Dungannon (1618–1670)
- Lewis Trevor, 2nd Viscount Dungannon (died 1693)
- Marcus Trevor, 3rd Viscount Dungannon (1669–1706)

== Viscounts Dungannon, second creation (1766) ==
- Arthur Hill-Trevor, 1st Viscount Dungannon (died 1771)
- Arthur Hill-Trevor, 2nd Viscount Dungannon (1763–1837)
- Arthur Hill-Trevor, 3rd Viscount Dungannon (1798–1862) (elected an Irish representative peer in 1855)

== Family tree ==
Family tree of the Marquesses of Downshire, Earls of Hillsborough, and the Barons Sandys

Edward Trevor c. 1580–1642
Viscount Dungannon of Tyrone (1st creation) and Baron Trevor of Rostrevor, 1662
Marcus Trevor; 1617–1670; 1st Viscount Dungannon, etc.	John Trevor
Lewis Trevor d. 1693; 2nd Viscount Dungannon, etc.	Marcus Trevor; 1669–1706; 3rd Viscount Dungannon, etc.	John Trevor c. 1637–1717
Viscountcy Dungannon (1st creation) and barony Trevor extinct, 1706
Anne Trevor	Michael Hill; 1672–1699
Baron Sandys of Ombersley in the County of Worcester (2nd creation), 1743	Viscount Hillsborough and Baron Hill of Kilwarlin, 1717	Viscount Dungannon (2nd creation) and Baron Hill of Olderfleet, 1766
Samuel Sandys; 1695–1770; 1st Baron Sandys	See also: Archbishop Sandys family tree	Trevor Hill; 1693–1742; 1st Viscount Hillsborough, etc.	Arthur Hill-Trevor; 1694–1771; 1st Viscount Dungannon, etc.
Earl of Hillsborough (Ireland) and Viscount Kilwarlin, 1751; Baron Harwich, 1756; Marquess of Downshire, Earl of Hillsborough (Great Britain) and Viscount Fairford, 1789
Edwin Sandys; 1726–1797; 2nd Baron Sandys	Martin Sandys; 1729–1768	Wills Hill; 1718–1793; 1st Marquess of Downshire, etc., 2nd Viscount Hillsborough, etc.	Arthur Hill Trevor; 1738–1770
Barony Sandys (2nd creation) extinct, 1797
Baron Sandys of Ombersley in the County of Worcester (3rd creation), 1802
Mary Hill; 1764–1836; 1st Baroness Sandys	Arthur Hill; 1753–1801; 2nd Marquess of Downshire, etc., 3rd Viscount Hillsborough, etc.	Arthur Hill-Trevor; 1798–1862; 3rd Viscount Dungannon
Viscountcy Dungannon (2nd creation) and barony Hill extinct, 1862
Arthur Blundell Sandys Trumbull Hill; 1788–1845; 3rd Marquess of Downshire, etc., 4th Viscount Hillsborough, etc.	Arthur Moyses William Hill; 1792–1860; 2nd Baron Sandys	Arthur Marcus Cecil (Hill) Sandys; 1798–1863; 3rd Baron Sandys	George Augusta Hill; 1801–1879
Arthur Wills Blundell Sandys Trumbull Windsor Hill; 1812–1868; 4th Marquess of Downshire, etc., 5th Viscount Hillsborough, etc.
Arthur Wills Blundell Trumbull Sandys Roden Hill; 1844–1874; 5th Marquess of Downshire, etc., 6th Viscount Hillsborough, etc.	Augustus Frederick Arthur (Hill) Sandys; 1840–1904; 4th Baron Sandys	Michael Edwin Marcus (Hill) Sandys; 1855–1948; 5th Baron Sandys	Arthur Sandys Hill; 1837–1923
Arthur Wills John Wellington Trumbull Blundell Hill; 1871–1918; 6th Marquess of Downshire, etc., 7th Viscount Hillsborough, etc.	Arthur Fitzgerald Sandys Hill; 1876–1961; 6th Baron Sandys
Arthur Wills Percy Wellington Blundell Trumbull Hill; 1894–1989; 7th Marquess of Downshire, etc., 8th Viscount Hillsborough, etc.	Lord Arthur Francis Hill; 1895–1953
Arthur "Robin" Ian Hill; 1929–2003; 8th Marquess of Downshire, etc., 9th Viscount Hillsborough, etc.	Richard Hill; 1931–2013; 7th Baron Sandys
Arthur Francis "Nicholas" Wills Hill b. 1959; 9th Marquess of Downshire, etc., 10th Viscount Hillsborough, etc., 8th Baron Sandys
Edmund Robin Arthur Hill b. 1996 styled Earl of Hillsborough
Heir apparent to the Marquessate of Downshire and the Barony of Sandys

== See also ==
- Baron Trevor
- Marquess of Downshire
- Baron Sandys
