= Arthur Hill =

Arthur Hill may refer to:

== Peers and politicians ==
- Arthur Hill (Anglo-Irish soldier) (before 1610–1663), Anglo-Irish landowner, soldier and politician
- Arthur Hill, 2nd Marquess of Downshire (1753–1801), British peer and Member of Parliament
- Arthur Hill, 3rd Marquess of Downshire (1788–1845), Irish peer
- Arthur Hill, 2nd Baron Sandys (1793–1860), Anglo-Irish soldier and politician
- Lord Arthur Augustus Edwin Hill (1800–1831), son of Arthur Hill, 2nd Marquess of Downshire
- Arthur Hill, 4th Marquess of Downshire (1812–1868), Irish peer
- Arthur Hill Gillmor (1824–1903), Canadian farmer, lumberman and Liberal politician
- Arthur Hill, 5th Marquess of Downshire (1844–1874), Irish peer
- Lord Arthur Hill (1846–1931), Anglo-Irish soldier and politician
- Arthur Hill, 6th Marquess of Downshire (1871–1918), Irish peer
- Arthur Hill (politician) (1873–1913), British Unionist politician
- Arthur Hill, 7th Marquess of Downshire (1894–1989), Irish peer
- Lord Arthur Francis Hill (1895–1953), father of Arthur Robin Ian Hill, 8th Marquess of Downshire
- Arthur Robin Ian Hill, 8th Marquess of Downshire (1929–2003), Irish peer

== Scholars ==
- Arthur George Hill (1857–1923), English organ builder and man of letters
- Arthur D. Hill (1869–1947), American legal expert
- J. Arthur Hill (1872–1951), English psychical researcher and writer
- Sir Arthur William Hill (1875–1941), English botanist and taxonomist
- Arthur VanCleve Hill (born 1950), American professor of operations management

== Sportsmen ==
- Arthur Hill (Australian cricketer) (1871–1936), right-hand batsman
- Arthur James Ledger Hill, 1871–1950), English cricketer
- Arthur Bertram St Hill (1872–1911), Barbadian cricketer
- Arthur Edwin Hill (1888–1966), British water polo Olympian
- Artur Hill or Artur Khil (born 1993), names used by Russian figure skater Artur Gachinski

== Other people ==
- Arthur Hill (English actor) (1875–1932), English theatre and film actor who wore animal costumes
- Arthur Hill (Canadian actor) (1922–2006), American-based Canadian actor
- Arthur Hill (architect) (1846–1921), Irish architect
- Arthur Hill (born 1999), English social media personality and musician

== See also ==
- Arthur Hill-Trevor (disambiguation)
- Arthur Hill High School, Saginaw, Michigan
- Arthur's Hill, area of Newcastle upon Tyne, England
- Arthur Hill Gilbert (1894–1970), American Impressionist painter
- Arthur Hill Hassall (1817–1894), English physician, chemist and microscopist
- Arthur Hills (1930–2021), American golf course designer
- Hill (surname)
