= Marquess of Downshire =

Title in the peerage of Ireland and associated titles in the peerage of Great Britain

Marquessate of Downshire
- Arms: Quarterly, 1st, Sable, on a Fess Argent, between three Leopards passant guardant Or, spotted of the field, as many Escallops Gules (for HILL); 2nd, Party per bend sinister Ermine and Ermines, a Lion rampant Or (for TREVOR); 3rd, Gules, a Quatrefoil Or (for ROWE); 4th, Argent, a Chevron Azure, between three Trefoils slipped per pale Gules and Vert(for ROWE). Crest: A Reindeer's Head couped Gules, attired and plain collared Or. Supporters: Dexter: a Leopard Or, spotted Sable, ducally gorged and chained Gules. Sinister: a Reindeer Gules, attired unguled and plain collared Or.
- Creation date: 20 August 1789
- Created by: George III
- Peerage: Peerage of Ireland
- First holder: Wills Hill, 1st Marquess of Downshire
- Present holder: Arthur Nicholas Hill, 9th Marquess of Downshire
- Heir apparent: Edmund Hill, Earl of Hillsborough
- Remainder to: The 1st Marquess' heirs male of the body lawfully begotten
- Subsidiary titles: Earl of Hillsborough (I); Earl of Hillsborough (GB); Viscount Hillsborough; Viscount Kilwarlin; Viscount Fairford; Baron Hill; Baron Harwich; Baron Sandys (UK)
- Status: Extant
- Seat: Clifton Castle
- Former seats: Hillsborough Castle; Easthampstead Park
- Motto: PER DEUM FERRUM OBTINUI (By God and my sword I have obtained); NE TENTES AUT PERFICE (Either attempt not, or accomplish)

Marquess of Downshire is a title in the Peerage of Ireland. It was created in 1789 for Wills Hill, 1st Earl of Hillsborough, a former Secretary of State.

Hill had already been created Earl of Hillsborough and Viscount Kilwarlin of County Down in the Peerage of Ireland in 1751 with remainder, in default of male issue of his own, to his uncle Arthur Hill, 1st Viscount Dungannon. He was further created Baron Harwich, of Harwich in the County of Essex, in the Peerage of Great Britain in 1756 with a seat in the British House of Lords. In 1772 he was further ennobled with a second Earldom of Hillsborough and as Viscount Fairford in the County of Gloucester, both in the Peerage of Great Britain.

Downshire was the eldest son of Trevor Hill, who had been created Viscount Hillsborough and Baron Hill of Kilwarlin in County Down, in the Peerage of Ireland in 1717, with remainder, in default of male issue of his own, to the male issue of his father, Michael Hill. Trevor Hill was the brother of the aforementioned Arthur Hill, 1st Viscount Dungannon.

In 2013, the 9th Marquess succeeded, under the terms of a special remainder of 1802, to the title Baron Sandys. The barony had been created for Mary Hill, Marchioness of Downshire, the widow of the second Marquess, with remainder to her younger sons, Lord Arthur Moyses William Hill, Lord Marcus Hill, Lord Augustus Hill and Lord George Hill successively, but if the male line failed, could be inherited by her male heirs of the eldest son, the third Marquess. This occurred in April 2013 with the death of Richard Hill, 7th Baron Sandys without male heirs.

Prior to the passage of the House of Lords Act 1999, the Marquesses sat in the House of Lords as the Earls of Hillsborough.

Among many other estates, the Marquess owned Hillsborough Castle, Blessington House in County Wicklow, and Easthampstead Park near Bracknell. The Marquesses are also Hereditary Constables of Hillsborough Fort.

The present family seat is Clifton Castle, near Masham, North Yorkshire.

== Ancestors ==
- Sir Moyses Hill, knight (died February 1630) came to Ireland as a soldier under the Earl of Essex.
- Arthur Hill (died April 1663) a colonel under Charles I, MP for Counties of Down, Antrim, and Armagh in the First Protectorate Parliament of 1654–55, appointed Constable of Hillsborough Castle in 1660, MP for County Down from 1661.
- William Hill (died 1693) succeeded to the Hillsborough estates on the death of his elder half-brother Moyses Hill, and was a Privy Councillor under Charles II and James II and Member of the Irish Parliament for Ballyshannon from 1661 until 1666.
- Michael Hill (c.1662–1699) was a Privy Councillor, and a Member of Parliament for Saltash and for Hillsborough. He married Ann, daughter and eventual heir of Sir John Trevor, Master of the Rolls and Speaker of the House of Commons.

== Viscounts Hillsborough (1717) ==
- Trevor Hill, 1st Viscount Hillsborough (1693–1742)
- Wills Hill, 2nd Viscount Hillsborough (1718–1793) (created Earl of Hillsborough in 1751)

== Earl of Hillsborough (1751 & 1772) ==
- Wills Hill, 1st Earl of Hillsborough (1718–1793) (created Marquess of Downshire in 1789)

== Marquesses of Downshire (1789) ==
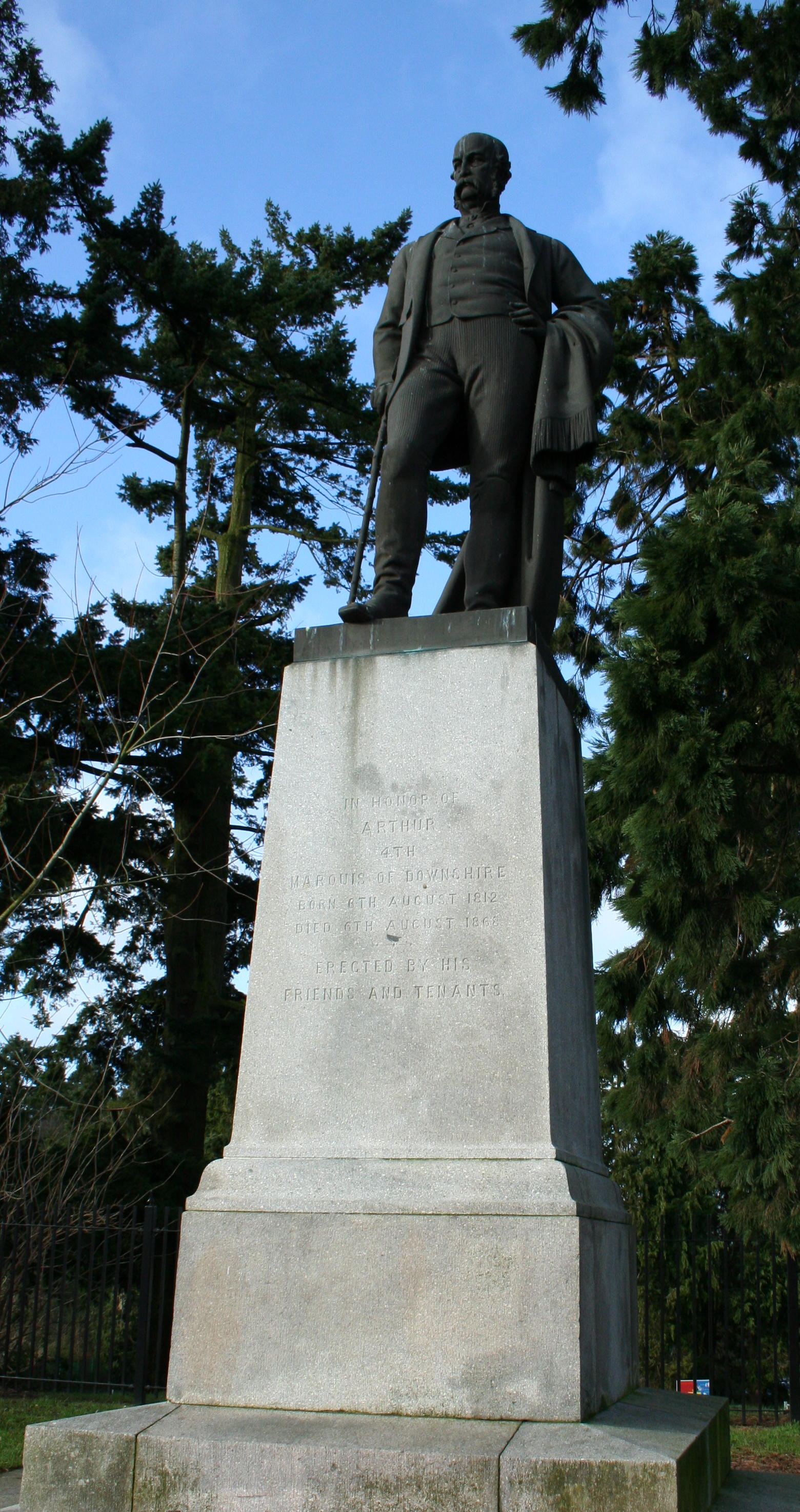
Monument to Arthur, 4th Marquis of Downshire, Hillsborough, County Down

- Wills Hill, 1st Marquess of Downshire (1718–1793)
- Arthur Hill, 2nd Marquess of Downshire (1753–1801)
- Arthur Blundell Sandys Trumbull Hill, 3rd Marquess of Downshire (1788–1845)
- Arthur Wills Blundell Sandys Trumbull Windsor Hill, 4th Marquess of Downshire (1812–1868)
- Arthur Wills Blundell Trumbull Sandys Roden Hill, 5th Marquess of Downshire (1844–1874)
- Arthur Wills John Wellington Trumbull Blundell Hill, 6th Marquess of Downshire (1871–1918)
- Arthur Wills Percy Wellington Blundell Trumbull Hill, 7th Marquess of Downshire (1894–1989)
- Arthur Robin Ian Hill, 8th Marquess of Downshire (1929–2003)
- Arthur Francis Nicholas Wills Hill, 9th Marquess of Downshire, 8th Baron Sandys (born 1959)

The heir apparent is the present holder's son Edmund Robin Arthur Hill, Earl of Hillsborough (born 1996).

== Family tree ==
Hill and Trevor family tree including: Marquesses of Downshire, Earls of Hillsborough, and the Barons Sandys

Edward Trevor c. 1580–1642
Viscount Dungannon of Tyrone (1st creation) and Baron Trevor of Rostrevor, 1662
Marcus Trevor; 1617–1670; 1st Viscount Dungannon, etc.	John Trevor
Lewis Trevor d. 1693; 2nd Viscount Dungannon, etc.	Marcus Trevor; 1669–1706; 3rd Viscount Dungannon, etc.	John Trevor c. 1637–1717
Viscountcy Dungannon (1st creation) and barony Trevor extinct, 1706
Anne Trevor	Michael Hill; 1672–1699
Baron Sandys of Ombersley in the County of Worcester (2nd creation), 1743	Viscount Hillsborough and Baron Hill of Kilwarlin, 1717	Viscount Dungannon (2nd creation) and Baron Hill of Olderfleet, 1766
Samuel Sandys; 1695–1770; 1st Baron Sandys	See also: Archbishop Sandys family tree	Trevor Hill; 1693–1742; 1st Viscount Hillsborough, etc.	Arthur Hill-Trevor; 1694–1771; 1st Viscount Dungannon, etc.
Earl of Hillsborough (Ireland) and Viscount Kilwarlin, 1751; Baron Harwich, 1756; Marquess of Downshire, Earl of Hillsborough (Great Britain) and Viscount Fairford, 1789
Edwin Sandys; 1726–1797; 2nd Baron Sandys	Martin Sandys; 1729–1768	Wills Hill; 1718–1793; 1st Marquess of Downshire, etc., 2nd Viscount Hillsborough, etc.	Arthur Hill Trevor; 1738–1770
Barony Sandys (2nd creation) extinct, 1797
Baron Sandys of Ombersley in the County of Worcester (3rd creation), 1802
Mary Sandys; 1764–1836; 1st Baroness Sandys	Arthur Hill; 1753–1801; 2nd Marquess of Downshire, etc., 3rd Viscount Hillsborough, etc.	Arthur Hill-Trevor; 1798–1862; 3rd Viscount Dungannon
Viscountcy Dungannon (2nd creation) and barony Hill extinct, 1862
Arthur Blundell Sandys Trumbull Hill; 1788–1845; 3rd Marquess of Downshire, etc., 4th Viscount Hillsborough, etc.	Arthur Moyses William Hill; 1792–1860; 2nd Baron Sandys	Arthur Marcus Cecil (Hill) Sandys; 1798–1863; 3rd Baron Sandys	George Augusta Hill; 1801–1879
Arthur Wills Blundell Sandys Trumbull Windsor Hill; 1812–1868; 4th Marquess of Downshire, etc., 5th Viscount Hillsborough, etc.
Arthur Wills Blundell Trumbull Sandys Roden Hill; 1844–1874; 5th Marquess of Downshire, etc., 6th Viscount Hillsborough, etc.	Augustus Frederick Arthur (Hill) Sandys; 1840–1904; 4th Baron Sandys	Michael Edwin Marcus (Hill) Sandys; 1855–1948; 5th Baron Sandys	Arthur Sandys Hill; 1837–1923
Arthur Wills John Wellington Trumbull Blundell Hill; 1871–1918; 6th Marquess of Downshire, etc., 7th Viscount Hillsborough, etc.	Arthur Fitzgerald Sandys Hill; 1876–1961; 6th Baron Sandys
Arthur Wills Percy Wellington Blundell Trumbull Hill; 1894–1989; 7th Marquess of Downshire, etc., 8th Viscount Hillsborough, etc.	Lord Arthur Francis Hill; 1895–1953
Arthur "Robin" Ian Hill; 1929–2003; 8th Marquess of Downshire, etc., 9th Viscount Hillsborough, etc.	Richard Hill; 1931–2013; 7th Baron Sandys
Arthur Francis "Nicholas" Wills Hill b. 1959; 9th Marquess of Downshire, etc., 10th Viscount Hillsborough, etc., 8th Baron Sandys
Edmund Robin Arthur Hill b. 1996 styled Earl of Hillsborough
Heir apparent to the Marquessate of Downshire and the Barony of Sandys

=== Line of succession ===
Line of succession (simplified)
- Arthur Hill, 3rd Marquess of Downshire (1788–1845)
  - Arthur Hill, 4th Marquess of Downshire (1812–1868)
    - Arthur Hill, 5th Marquess of Downshire (1844–1874)
      - Arthur Hill, 6th Marquess of Downshire (1871–1918)
        - Arthur Hill, 7th Marquess of Downshire (1894–1989)
        - Lord Arthur Francis Henry Hill (1895–1953)
          - Arthur Hill, 8th Marquess of Downshire (1929–2003)
            - Arthur Hill, 9th Marquess of Downshire (born 1959)
              - (1). Edmund Hill, Earl of Hillsborough (b. 1996)
            - (2). Lord Anthony Ian Hill (b. 1961)
              - (3). Marcus Robert Francis Hill (b. 1994)
              - (4). Orlando Harry Wills Hill (b. 1997)
              - (5). George Oliver Percy Hill (b. 2000)
  - (Arthur) Edwin Hill-Trevor, 1st Baron Trevor (1819–1894)
    - Barons Trevor

== See also ==
- Viscount Dungannon
- Baron Sandys
- Baron Trevor
