= Easthampstead Park =

Victorian mansion in Berkshire, England

Coordinates: 51.3984°N 0.7882°W

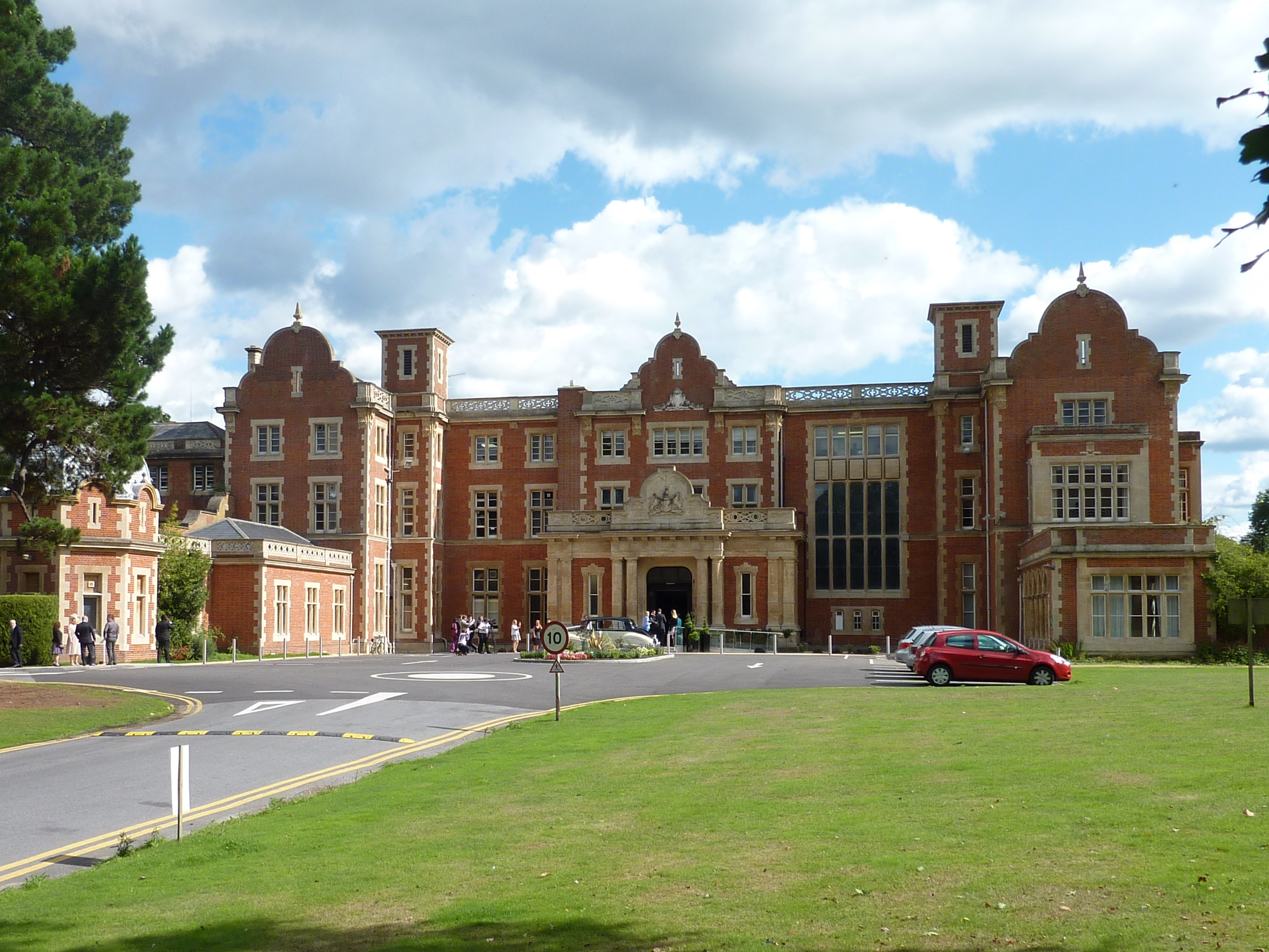
Front of house

Easthampstead Park is a Grade II listed Victorian mansion in the civil parish of Bracknell in the English county of Berkshire. It is now a hotel and conference centre.

== Location ==
Since the demise of Easthampstead parish, the house has been located in the western extremes of Bracknell parish, between the Southern Industrial Estate and Wokingham. It is surrounded by a 60-acre (240,000 m^{2}) estate, which, in 1786, had extended to 5,000 acres (20 km^{2}). Some of this land is now taken up by the Downshire Golf Course.

== Architecture ==
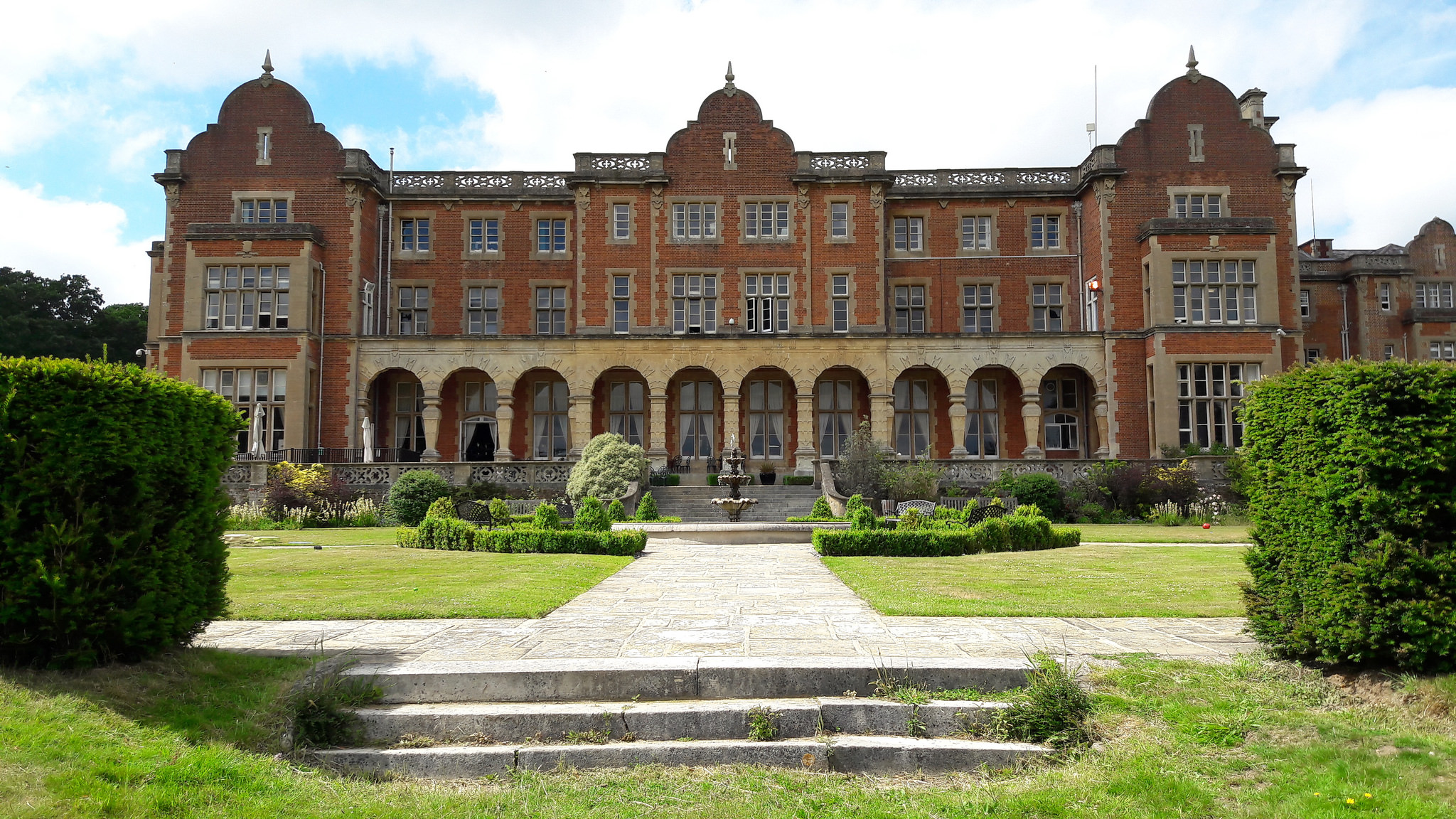
Back of house and gardens

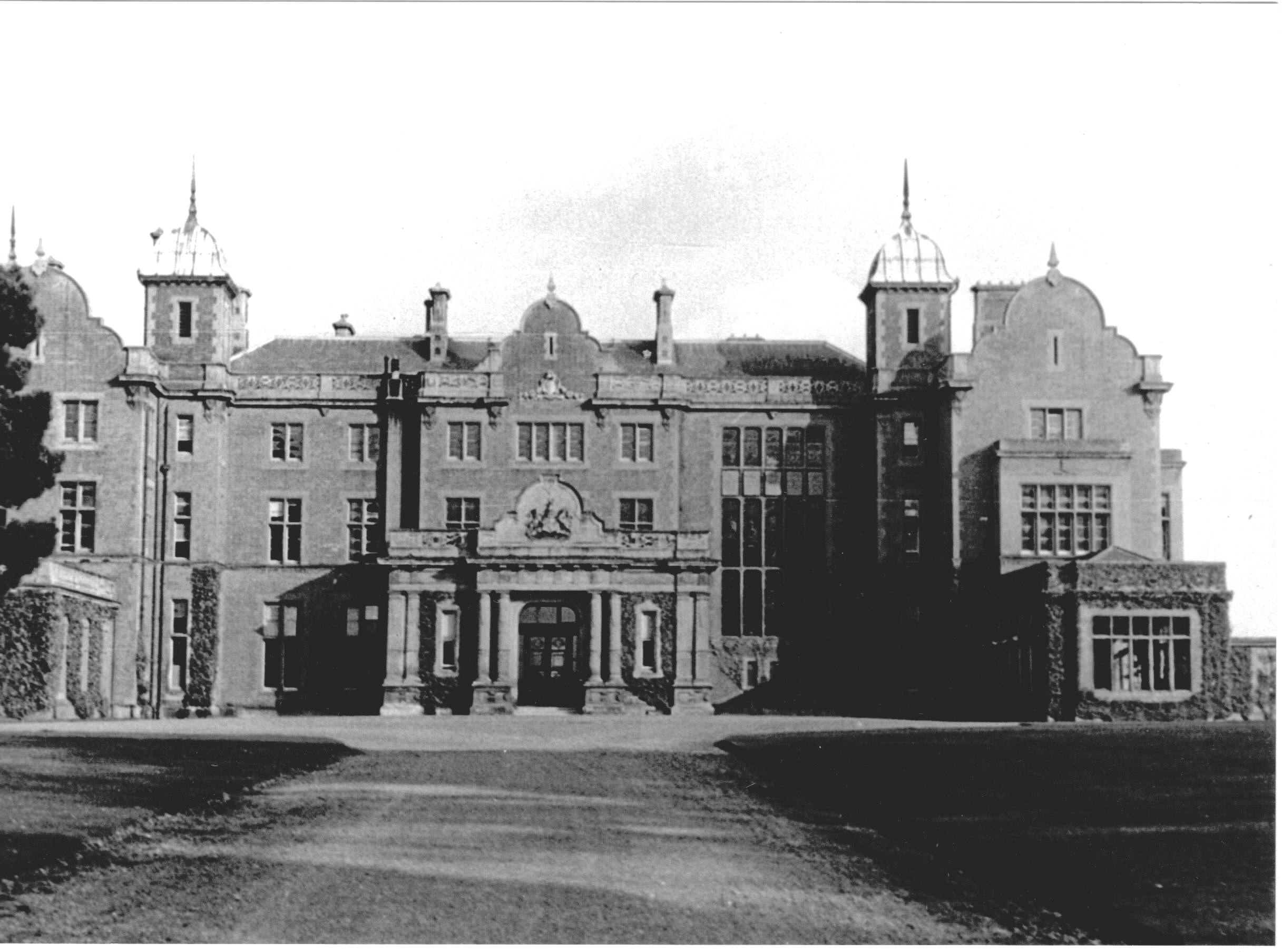
The front of the house in 1936

Easthampstead Park is listed by the Department for the Environment as "a building of historic and architectural interest, in Jacobean style with curved gables, pierced stone parapet and stone frontispiece of naive classicism". It was erected in 1864. The pitched roof and the cupolas above the towers were lost sometime between 1936 and present, perhaps following the 1949 fire.

== Landscape and grounds ==
The estate's landscape design incorporates a traditional ha-ha to separate the gardens from the surrounding parkland. The grounds contain mature trees planted during the 19th-century expansions by the Downshire family.

== History ==
=== Royal lodge ===
In the Middle Ages, Easthampstead was a part of Windsor Forest, and was reserved for royal hunting. King Edward III had a hunting lodge at Easthampstead, an easy ride from Windsor, which he had built in 1350.

Henry VII and his son Arthur, Prince of Wales arranged the latter's marriage to Catherine of Aragon at the lodge, and later rode out from here for their first meeting with the princess on Finchampstead Ridges. After the death of his brother in 1502, Henry VIII married Catherine as his first wife, and years later, she spent a miserable few years at Easthampstead Park, awaiting news of her husband's attempt to divorce her when his attentions turned to Anne Boleyn.

Sir John Mason (1503-1566) became Keeper of Easthampstead Park in 1548. Richard Coningsby was keeper in 1594. King James I enlarged and improved the estate, which was well stocked with deer.

=== Trumbull home ===
Charles I gave the Park to William Trumbull on 28 March 1629, in recognition of his service as ambassador to the Archduke Albert of Austria, Regent of the Netherlands, and later as Clerk of the Privy Council, on the condition that he maintain a herd of 200 deer for the King's recreation in the deer park. The royal hunting lodge was incorporated into a newly built mansion. William Trumbull died in September 1635 and is buried in Easthampstead parish church.

William Trumbull (2nd) lived from 1594 to 1668. In 1636, Charles I issued a charter to give Easthampstead Park to the Trumbulls permanently, confirming the gift of 1628. The charter had long been lost, but was recently discovered in London. It was subsequently purchased by Berkshire Record Office with support from the MLA/Victoria and Albert Museum Purchase Grant Fund.

Sir William Trumbull (3rd) (1639–1716) was the most distinguished of the family, active in the Royal service overseas. He was a fellow of All Souls College, Oxford and a barrister. Sir William Trumbull befriended Alexander Pope the poet, who lived in Binfield and was a frequent visitor to Easthampstead Park.

Another poet, Elijah Fenton, was tutor to William Trumbull (4th) (1708–1760). His only child, Mary Trumbull, married Martin Sandys in 1760. Their only child, Mary Sandys (1764–1836), married Arthur Hill, 2nd Marquess of Downshire (1753–1801) in 1786 and was later created Baroness Sandys.

==== Trumbull manuscripts ====
The Trumbull inheritance included 380 volumes of manuscripts collected by Sir William Trumbull (3rd). The archive, which features letters by Stuart kings, Philip II of Spain, Marie de Medici, Bacon, Donne, Dryden, Fenton, Pope and Weckherlin, had been on loan to Berkshire county record office. In the summer of 1989, the collection was sent to Sotheby's in London, with an estimate of £2.5m. But on the eve of the November sale, a deal was done with the Inland Revenue, the auction was cancelled and the British Library took the papers.

=== Marquess' estate ===
Arthur Hill succeeded as 2nd Marquess of Downshire on the death of his father Wills Hill in 1793, who started the building of Hillsborough Castle in Northern Ireland, completed in 1797.

He had five sons:

- Arthur Blundell Sandys Trumbull Hill, 3rd Marquess of Downshire (1788–1845)
- Arthur Moyses William Hill, 2nd Baron Sandys (1793–1860)
- Arthur Marcus Cecil Sandys, 3rd Baron Sandys (1798–1863)
- Arthur Augustus Edwin Sandys (1800–1831)
- Major Lord George Augusta Sandys (1801–1879)

In a letter in May 1857, to a Mrs Russell of Thornhill, Jane Carlyle (wife of Thomas Carlyle), whose friend Lady Ashburton had recently died and who was suffering from influenza, wrote:

"In the meantime I am going for a week to Easthampstead Park (the Marquis of Downshire's), almost immediately. But these great grand Country Houses are not the places Nature prompts me to take my sick nerves and bad spirits to! Especially when I am not going as a sort of animated, still wholly irresponsible carpet-bag, with Mr. Carlyle's name on it, but on my own basis! ..."

Easthampstead house was only one of the properties of the Marquess of Downshire, who owned large estates of 115,000 acres (465 km^{2}) in Northern Ireland. In 1860, the fourth Marquess, confusingly called Arthur Wills Blundell Sandys Trumbull Windsor Hill (1812–1868) demolished the old mansion, leaving only a stable block, and built the present house which was completed in 1864. At about the same time as the present mansion was erected, the Marchioness provided for the rebuilding of St Michael's parish church, Easthampstead where there are memorials to the Trumbull and Downshire families and to the poet, Elijah Fenton.

In 1885, King Edward VII visited Easthampstead Park while Prince of Wales. One of his handwritten letters, dated from the Park 18 June 1885, has been offered for sale by Heritage Auction Galleries of Dallas, Texas.

The Downshires were very active in the affairs of Ireland, but Arthur Hill, 6th Marquess of Downshire (1871–1918) lived principally at Easthampstead Park until his death. These were the golden days of Easthampstead Park, especially during Royal Ascot week each year. The sixth Marquess and his son employed a large staff of gardeners and others, and took great personal interest in the estate, even assisting with the upkeep of the roads with their own steam roller. The Park also contained a miniature steam railway, since removed to a south coast resort. The old engine shed still survives near the original ha-ha at the edge of the current gardens however. The gardens are well stocked with a large number of mature trees of diverse and often exotic species.

During the Second World War, part of the mansion was used by St Paul's School, which was evacuated from London. Until 1945, masters and boys lived in Crowthorne, lessons took place in Easthampstead Park, while Wellington College lent playing fields and laboratories. The Army made use of the Park and built many Nissen huts. The Army's presence attracted German aircraft in 1941 which dropped a stick of bombs down the main drive, the last one hitting the Lodge at the main gate.

== College and school ==
After the War, Easthampstead Park was sold to Berkshire County Council. After repairs following a fire in 1949, a training college for women teachers was opened, the mansion was altered and extended, and a new gymnasium and study block, now known as the Whitfield building was erected.

This 1949 fire caused significant structural damage to the upper levels, resulting in the permanent loss of the original Victorian pitched roof and cupolas, which were subsequently replaced with a flattened roofline.[5] Tennis courts were built or renovated, but one at the edge of the park is derelict. A Christmas Party in the well of the main staircase was held every year during the life of the college. There was a library situated behind the main hall, and the students developed their own garden near to one of the tennis courts. During the period, the gardens contained a vegetable garden near to the present school. Dances were organised regularly in the main hall.[citation needed]

In 1968, Easthampstead Park College was amalgamated with Bulmershe College to form the Berkshire College of Education. The last students training to teach were withdrawn from Easthampstead Park in 1972, when an Educational Centre was opened, initially comprising an adult residential college and Easthampstead Park School.

In 1984 SEBEV Search and Rescue moved into the basement area of the mansion which was already being used as a government nuclear fallout shelter, and remained there until relocating in 2018.

In 1995, Easthampstead Park School relocated to a new location nearby and the mansion is now used as Easthampstead Park Conference Centre and Bracknell Forest Education Centre. Inside the mansion, rooms are named after the Trumbull, Sandys, Hill and Downshire families and their estates, and former staff of the college such as Wylie and Lewis.

Coincidentally, the school's first Headteacher, Derrick Hurd had previously been the first Head of John Mason School in Abingdon, named after the Oxfordshire spy and diplomat who, in the 16th Century had been keeper of the Easthampstead Park estate.

Hotel and Conference Centre

Active Hospitality, which came into existence in 2016, won the contract In 2018 to take over the house from Bracknell Council and have agreed a 999-year lease with the council after proposing to spend £10m on developing the site. In 2024, Active Hospitality opened the new King's Suite, a purpose-built venue to hold weddings renting out from £25,000. The renovation included the restoration of historic interior features in accordance with the building's Grade II listed status.
