= Baron Trevor =

Barony in the Peerage of Great Britain

Arms of Trevor: Party per bend sinister ermine and ermines, a lion rampant or

Baron Trevor is a title that has been created three times. It was created first in 1662 in the Peerage of Ireland along with the viscountcy of Dungannon. For information on this creation, which became extinct in 1706, see Viscount Dungannon.

The title was next created in the Peerage of Great Britain in 1712 for the lawyer Sir Thomas Trevor; the fourth Baron was created Viscount Hampden in 1776. Both titles became extinct in 1824 (see Viscount Hampden for more information).

The final creation of the title came in the Peerage of the United Kingdom in 1880. Lord Edwin Hill, third son of Arthur Hill, 3rd Marquess of Downshire and for many years Member of Parliament for County Down, had succeeded to the estates of his kinsman Arthur Hill-Trevor, 3rd Viscount Dungannon (see the Viscount Dungannon) in 1862 and had assumed by Royal licence the additional surname of Trevor. In 1880 he was raised to the peerage as Baron Trevor, of Brynkinalt in the County of Denbigh. He was succeeded by his son, the second Baron. He was Vice-Lieutenant of Denbighshire. On his death in 1923 the title passed to his half-brother, the third Baron. As of 2017 the title is held by the latter's grandson, the fifth Baron, who succeeded his father in 1997.

The family estate is Brynkinalt (Welsh: Bryncunallt), near Chirk, Wrexham County Borough, in Wales.

== Barons Trevor, First creation (1662) ==
see Viscount Dungannon (1662 creation)

== Barons Trevor, Second creation (1712) ==
see Viscount Hampden (1776 creation)

== Barons Trevor, Third creation (1880) ==
- (Arthur) Edwin Hill-Trevor, 1st Baron Trevor (1819–1894)
- Arthur William Hill-Trevor, 2nd Baron Trevor (1852–1923)
- Charles Edward Hill-Trevor, 3rd Baron Trevor (1863–1950)
- Charles Edwin Hill-Trevor, 4th Baron Trevor (1928–1997)
- Marke Charles Hill-Trevor, 5th Baron Trevor (b. 1970)

The heir presumptive is the present holder's brother Hon. Iain Robert Hill-Trevor (b. 1971).

== See also ==
- Viscount Dungannon
- Viscount Hampden
- Marquess of Downshire
- Baron Sandys
