= Robin Hill, 8th Marquess of Downshire =

Irish peer

Arthur Robin Ian Hill, 8th Marquess of Downshire (10 May 1929 – 18 December 2003), known as Robin Hill, was an Irish peer and the Hereditary Constable of Hillsborough Fort. He was the only son of Lord Arthur Francis Hill and Ishabel Wilhelmina Sheila MacDougall. He successfully re-established his Ulster-based landowning family in North Yorkshire following the Irish Land Acts and the creation of Bracknell New Town, which had largely deprived him of his original estates.

== Life ==
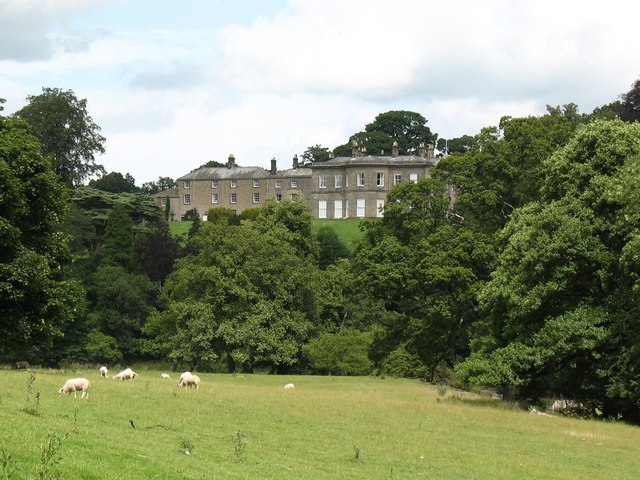
Clifton Castle, North Yorkshire

Hill was born in Brompton Square, London. As a youth he was taught the oboe by Leon Goossens. At Eton College he captained the school shooting VIII and led it to win the Asburton Shield at Bisley. On leaving school, he did his National Service with the Royal Scots Greys in Germany from 1948 to 1950. Life in Ardingly, a discount house and chartered accountancy followed, with awards of ACA in 1959 and FCA 1962. In 1963 he took up farming. The family's Irish domains and their Berkshire estate with its 1870s retro-Jacobean Burne-Jones and Morris windowed mansion at Easthampstead had both become alienated and sold. His predecessors had not found alternatives, so the young Hill, now in possession of a wife and heir, was in need of a seat. He found Clifton Castle, on the banks of the River Ure in North Yorkshire, of which Pevsner had written: 'built in 1802–10, and not at all in the castle mood'.

In March 1989 Hill succeeded his uncle in his eight peerages: five of Ireland and three of Great Britain. The need to satisfy the Treasury immediately led Lord Downshire, as he was now known, into a mild controversy. The 2nd Marquess had married the heir of the last Trumbull. This inheritance included the Easthampstead estate, near Bracknell, west of Windsor, and with it the Trumbull papers. These comprised 388 volumes of manuscripts collected by Sir William Trumbull (1639–1716), British Ambassador to Paris, and to Constantinople, and his grandson William Trumbull, British Resident in Brussels. The archive – featuring letters by Stuart kings, Philip II of Spain, Marie de' Medici, Bacon, Donne, Dryden, Fenton, Alexander Pope and Georg Rudolf Weckherlin – had been on loan to Berkshire Record Office. In the summer of 1989 the collection was sent to Sotheby's in London, divided into 63 lots and prepared for sale, with an estimate of £2.5m. Breakup was avoided as on the eve of the November sale the auction was cancelled and the British Library took the papers. (The 388 volumes are now catalogued as Add MS 72242–72621.)

== House of Lords ==
Taking his seat in the House of Lords in November 1989, he joined the Conservative benches. A member of the Lords bridge-team, he was a rare speaker, but had become increasingly more attentive. By the time of his expulsion in 1999, he was the most attentive of the seven Irish Marquesses. In ten years in the Lords he made two speeches and laid down one written question. His maiden speech, made in October 1994, was part of a debate taking note of "recent developments in Northern Ireland".

In reply for the Opposition, Lord Williams of Mostyn said of it: ".. I hope I may, with respect, point to one, the maiden speech of the noble Marquess, Lord Downshire, a speech which I personally found to be of interest and of great content, both of which are adjectives one cannot normally ascribe to maiden speeches. ... it would be fair to say that Ireland as a whole, as other noble Lords have said, has had a turbulent history and that fact has been emphasised by its continuance in Ulster. There are a multiplicity of reasons for that phenomenon, although some try to award part of the blame to the equivocal manner in which Ireland has been treated successively by England, Great Britain and the United Kingdom. I would not subscribe entirely to that view, although I believe that, in establishing a link between England and Ireland, fundamental mistakes were made at the start which are taking many centuries to resolve ... [T]here is no doubt that the joint declaration marks a sea change in contemporary Irish politics. The opportunity it affords for all who hold both the Province and Ireland as a whole most dear they will ignore at their peril."

In a debate entitled 'Pylons in the Vale of York' of March 1995, he pointed to new problems regarding public-private finance, landowners and compulsory purchase: 'there could come a time, and it will surely come, when the pylon-builders' purse runs out and compulsory purchase arrives. Surely, there then arises a more potent conflict of interest-the invocation of public power in order to provide private profit.' This was notably astute, as the private profit in this case was to be Enron's. His one written question referred to the "Targets of the Pesticides" safety-directive.

== Marriages ==
In 1957, he married Juliet Weld-Forester, a daughter of the 7th Baron Forester. She died in 1986. They had three children, Nicholas, Anthony and Georgina. In 1989, he remarried, to Diana Cross, a daughter of Sir Ronald Cross, Bt. She died in 1998. He married thirdly Tessa Prain in 2003. She died in 2023.

== Death ==
He died on 18 December 2003, aged 74, survived by his two sons and one daughter by his first marriage, and by his third wife. His elder son, who until then used the courtesy title of Earl of Hillsborough, succeeded him and also became Baron Sandys in 2013.

== Sources ==
- The Daily Telegraph, January 2004 (from info provided by R. de Salis)

Peerage of Ireland
| Preceded by Arthur Hill | Marquess of Downshire; 1989–2003 | Succeeded by Nicholas Hill |
