= Arthur Hill, 5th Marquess of Downshire =

Irish peer

Arthur Wills Blundell Trumbull Sandys Roden Hill, 5th Marquess of Downshire (24 December 1844 – 31 March 1874), was an Irish peer, styled Earl of Hillsborough until 1868. He became Marquess of Downshire in 1868 on the death of his father. He lived at the family seat of Easthampstead Park, within 5,000 acres in Berkshire, and Hillsborough Castle, within 115,000 acres in Hillsborough, County Down.

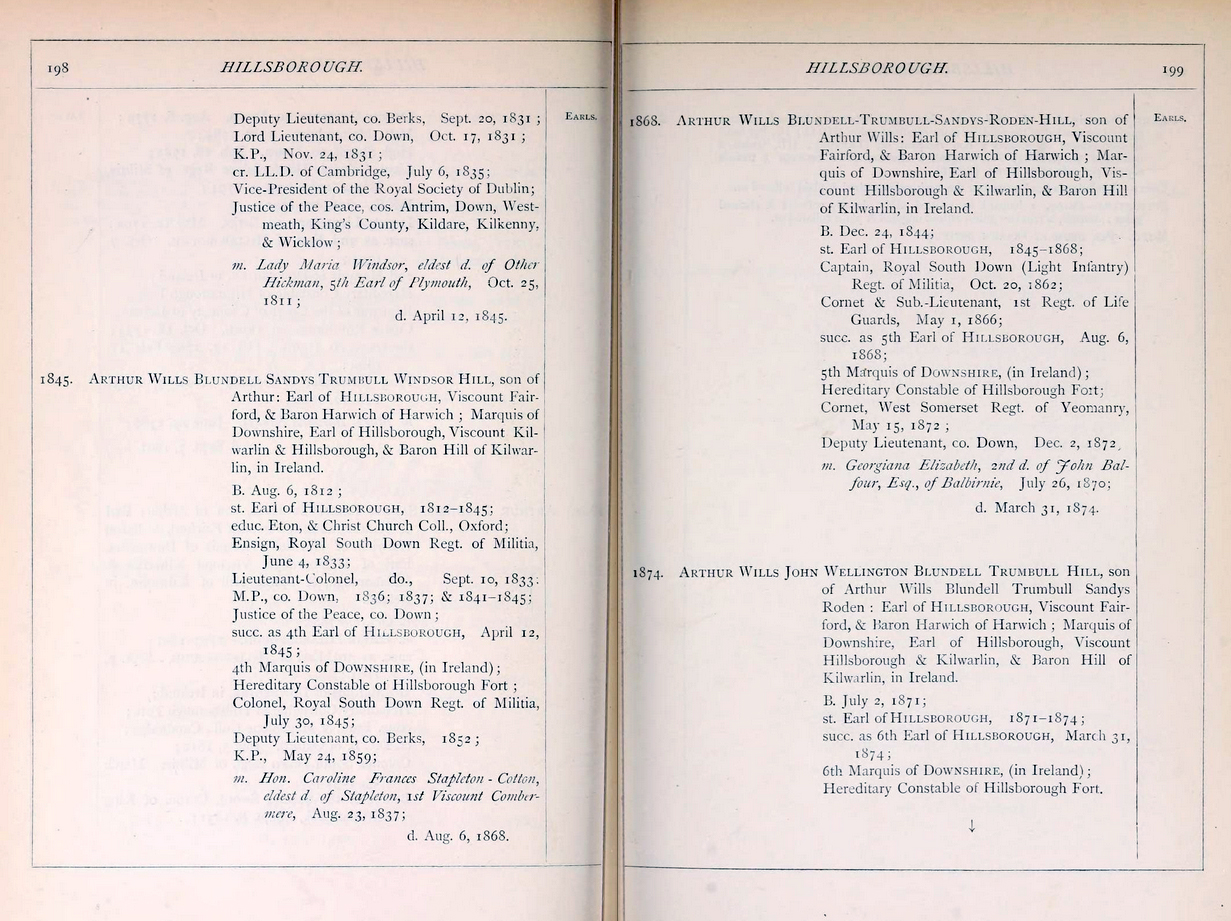
Marquess of Downshire in The Official Baronage of England, v. 2 (1886)

Arthur Hill was son of Arthur Hill, 4th Marquess of Downshire (1812–1868), known as the 'Big Marquess', and the Hon. Caroline Frances Stapleton Cotton, the eldest daughter of Stapleton Cotton, 1st Viscount Combermere. Hill's siblings were Lady Alice Maria Hill (7 November 1842 – 25 February 1928), who married Thomas Taylour, Earl of Bective, and Colonel Lord Arthur Hill (1846–1931).

Hill married Georgiana Elizabeth Balfour (died 12 January 1919), on 25 July 1870, daughter of Colonel John Balfour of Balbirnie (1811–1895) and Lady Georgiana Isabel (Campbell) Balfour (died 3 December 1884). Their only child was Arthur Wills John Wellington Trumbull Blundell Hill who became the 6th Marquess of Downshire.

He was a captain in the Royal South Down Regiment of Militia from 1862, a cornet and lieutenant in the 1st Regiment of Life Guards from 1866, a cornet in the West Somerset Regiment of Yeomanry and Deputy Lieutenant of County Down in 1872, and the Hereditary Constable of Hillsborough Fort.

Arthur Hill and his father were instrumental in major tree planting within the park of their Hillsborough Castle.

Peerage of Ireland
Preceded by Arthur Hill	Marquess of Downshire; 1868–1874	Succeeded by Arthur Hill
