= Wills Hill, 1st Marquess of Downshire =

British politician (1718–1793)

The Most Honourable The Marquess of Downshire PC
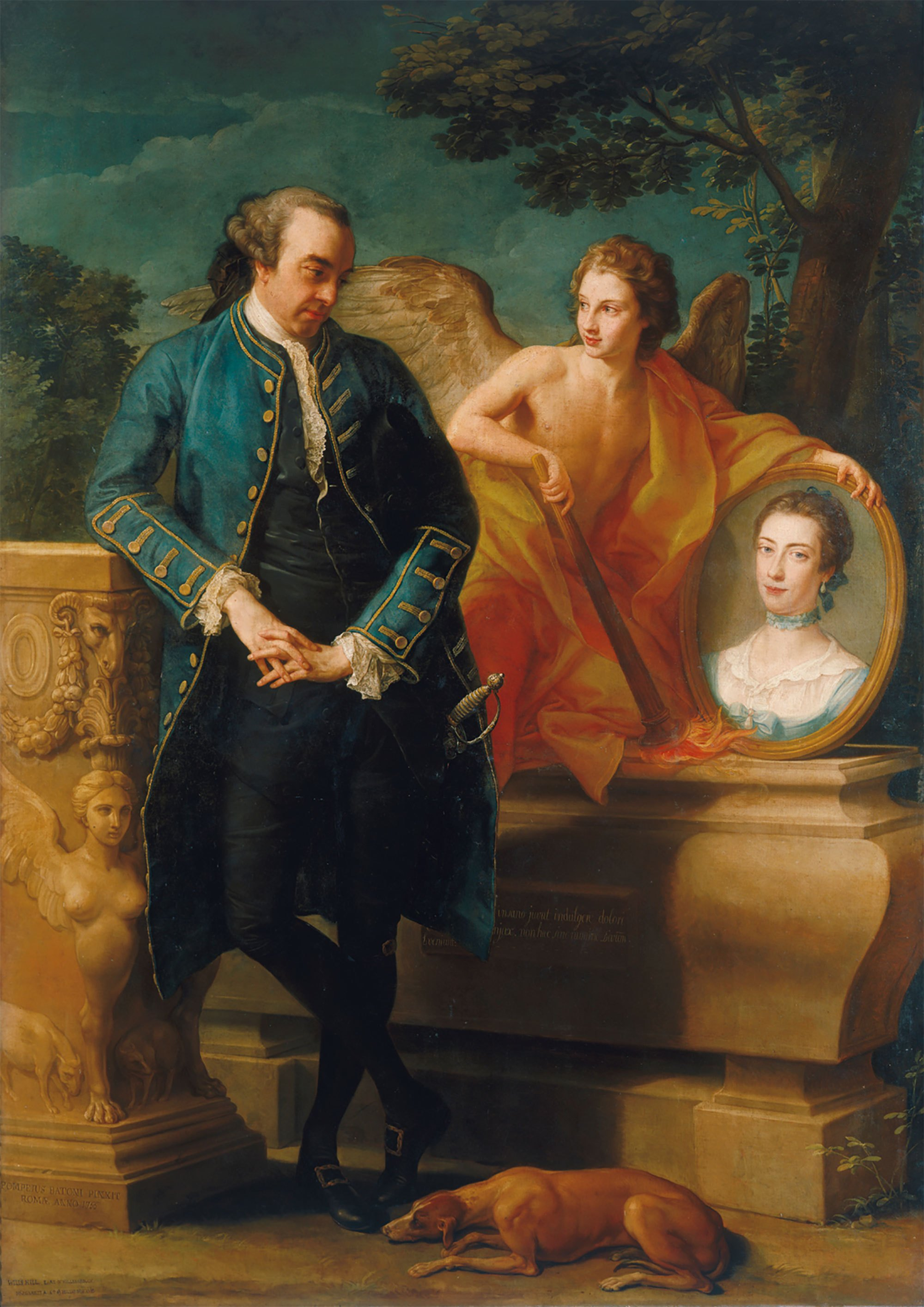
- Portrait by Pompeo Batoni, 1766

First Lord of Trade
- In office 9 September 1763 – 20 July 1765
- Monarch: George III
- Prime Minister: George Grenville
- Preceded by: The Earl of Shelburne
- Succeeded by: The Earl of Dartmouth
- In office 16 August – December 1766
- Monarch: George III
- Prime Minister: The Earl of Chatham
- Preceded by: The Earl of Dartmouth
- Succeeded by: The Viscount Clare
- In office 20 January 1768 – 31 August 1772
- Monarch: George III
- Prime Minister: The Earl of Chatham; The Duke of Grafton; Lord North
- Preceded by: The Viscount Clare
- Succeeded by: The Earl of Dartmouth

Secretary of State for the Colonies
- In office 27 February 1768 – 27 August 1772
- Monarch: George III
- Prime Minister: The Earl of Chatham; The Duke of Grafton; Lord North
- Preceded by: New office
- Succeeded by: The Earl of Dartmouth

Secretary of State for the Southern Department
- In office 24 November 1779 – 27 March 1782
- Monarch: George III
- Prime Minister: Lord North
- Preceded by: The Viscount Weymouth
- Succeeded by: Office abolished

Personal details
- Born: 30 May 1718 Fairford, Gloucestershire
- Died: 7 October 1793 (aged 75) Hillsborough Castle, County Down
- Spouse(s): (1) Lady Margaretta FitzGerald (d. 1766) (2) Mary Stawell (1726–1780)

Wills Hill, 1st Marquess of Downshire, PC (30 May 1718 – 7 October 1793), known as the 2nd Viscount Hillsborough from 1742 to 1751 and as the 1st Earl of Hillsborough from 1751 to 1789, was a British politician of the Georgian era.

Best known in North America as the Earl of Hillsborough, he served as Secretary of State for the Colonies from 1768 to 1772, a critical period leading toward the American War of Independence.

== Background ==
Born in Fairford, Gloucestershire, Wills Hill was the son of Trevor Hill, 1st Viscount Hillsborough, and Mary, daughter of Anthony Rowe. He was named after General Sir Charles Wills, his godfather.

== Political career ==
Hill, known retrospectively as Downshire, was returned to Parliament for Warwick in 1741, a seat he held until 1756. He succeeded his father as The 2nd Viscount Hillsborough in May 1742 (as this was an Irish peerage he was able to continue to sit in the British House of Commons). Lord Hillsborough, as he now was, was the same year appointed Lord Lieutenant of County Down and Custos Rotulorum of County Down.

In 1751, he was created Earl of Hillsborough in the Peerage of Ireland. In 1754, he was made Comptroller of the Household, a post he held until 1756, and appointed a Privy Counsellor. In 1756, he was created Baron Harwich, of Harwich in the County of Essex, in the Peerage of Great Britain, which entitled him to a seat in the House of Lords.

For nearly two years, between 1763 and 1765, Lord Hillsborough was President of the Board of Trade and Plantations under George Grenville, and after a brief period of retirement he filled the same position in 1766, and then that of joint Postmaster General, under the Earl of Chatham. From 1768 to 1772, Hillsborough was Secretary of State for the Colonies and also President of the Board of Trade. Both in and out of office, Hillsborough opposed all concessions to the American colonists, but he favoured the project for a union between England and the Kingdom of Ireland. On his retirement in 1772, he was created Earl of Hillsborough in the Peerage of Great Britain.

In 1779 he served as Secretary of State for the Southern Department, remaining until 1782. He was the last person to serve in this position, because the Secretaries of State were reorganized.

In 1789, he was made Marquess of Downshire in the Irish peerage.

== Family and legacy ==
Arms of Hill, Marquess of Downshire: Sable, on a fess argent between three leopards passant guardant or spotted of the field as many escallops gules

Lord Downshire married firstly Lady Margaretta, daughter of The 19th Earl of Kildare, in 1747. His second daughter and last child by his first marriage was Lady Charlotte Hill, wife of The 1st Earl Talbot. Lady Talbot was the subject of a notable portrait by Sir Joshua Reynolds.

After her death in 1766, he married secondly Mary Bilson-Legge, 1st Baroness Stawell, daughter of Edward, 4th Baron Stawell, and widow of Henry Bilson-Legge, in 1768. She died in 1780.

Lord Downshire died on 7 October 1793, aged 75, at his estate Hillsborough Castle. He was succeeded by his son from his first marriage, Arthur.

In the United States, Hillsborough County, New Hampshire, Hillsborough Township, New Jersey, the town of Hillsborough, New Hampshire, within the county, the town of Hillsborough, North Carolina, and Hillsborough County, Florida and the Hillsbourgh River , Hillsboro, Highland, Ohio were named after the Marquess. Hillsborough, California, named for Hillsborough, New Hampshire, is an indirect namesake.

In Canada, Hillsborough Bay, on Prince Edward Island, and the village of Hillsborough, New Brunswick, were named in Downshire's honour.

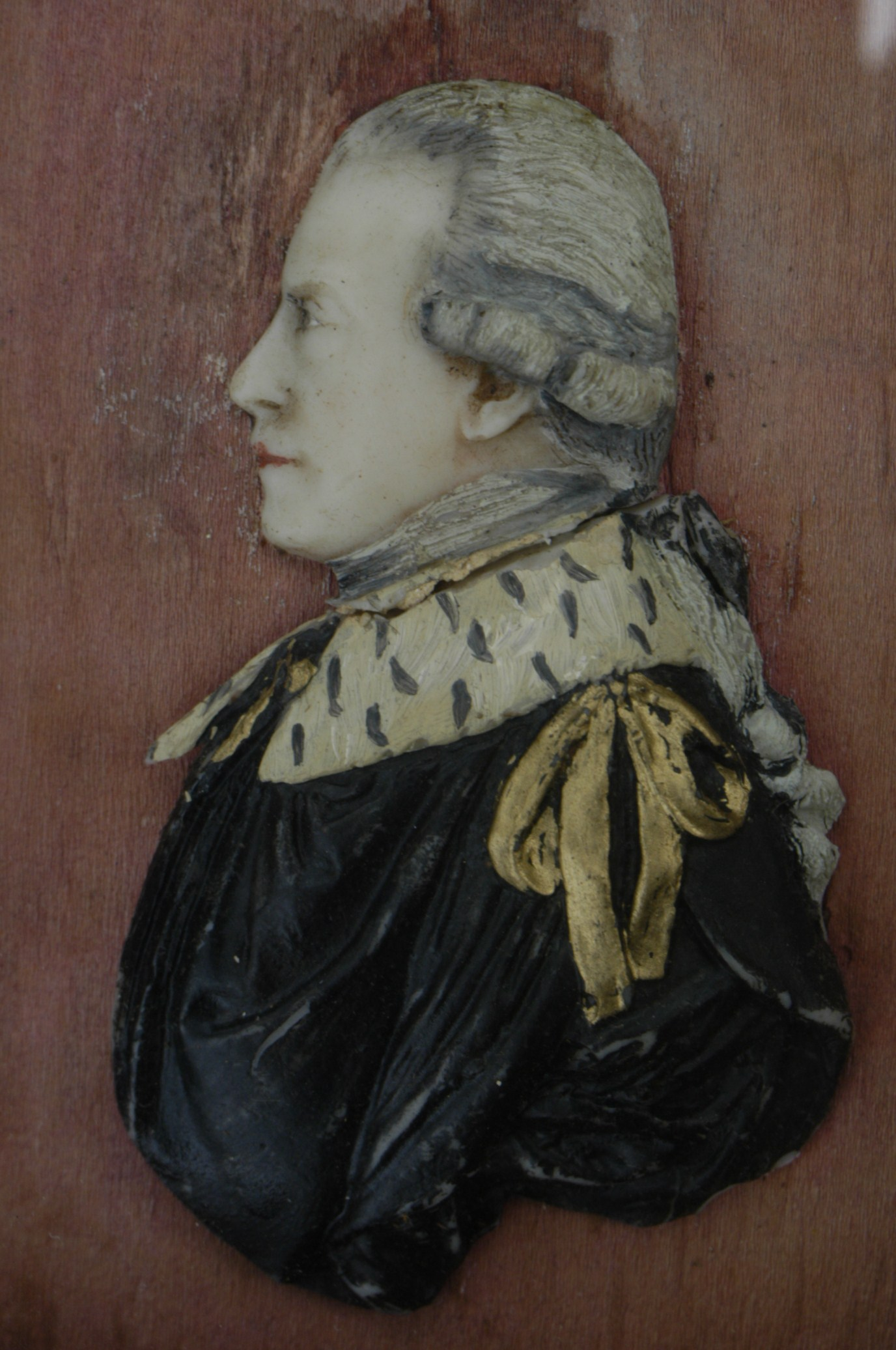
Wax profile portrait of Lord Hillsborough by 'Lewis'.

== Bibliography ==
- Murdoch, Tessa, ed. Great Irish Households: Inventories from the Long Eighteenth Century. Cambridge: John Adamson, 2022 ISBN 978-1-898565-17-8 OCLC 1233305993. See pp. 125–8 and 137–45 for transcripts of the inventories of Wills Hill's house at Hillsborough in 1746 and of his later house, Hillsborough Lodge, in 1777.

Parliament of Great Britain
Preceded by Thomas Archer; Henry Archer	Member of Parliament for Warwick; 1741–1756; With: Henry Archer	Succeeded by Henry Archer; John Spencer
Political offices
Preceded by Sir Conyers Darcy	Comptroller of the Household; 1754–1756	Succeeded by Lord Hobart
Preceded by Richard Arundell	Treasurer of the Chamber; 1755–1756	Succeeded by Charles Townshend
Preceded by The Earl of Shelburne	First Lord of Trade; 1763–1765	Succeeded by The Earl of Dartmouth
Preceded by The Earl of Dartmouth	First Lord of Trade; 1766	Succeeded by The Lord Nugent
Preceded by The Viscount Clare	First Lord of Trade; 1768–1772	Succeeded by The Earl of Dartmouth
New title	Secretary of State for the Colonies; 1768–1772	Succeeded by The Earl of Dartmouth
Preceded by The Viscount Weymouth	Secretary of State for the Southern Department; 1779–1782	Office abolished
Peerage of Great Britain
New creation	Earl of Hillsborough; 1772–1793	Succeeded by Arthur Hill
New creation	Baron Harwich; 1756–1793	Succeeded by Arthur Hill
Peerage of Ireland
New creation	Marquess of Downshire; 1789–1793	Succeeded by Arthur Hill
New creation	Earl of Hillsborough; 1751–1793	Succeeded by Arthur Hill
Preceded by Trevor Hill	Viscount Hillsborough; 1742–1793	Succeeded by Arthur Hill
