= Arthur Hill, 2nd Marquess of Downshire =

British peer and MP

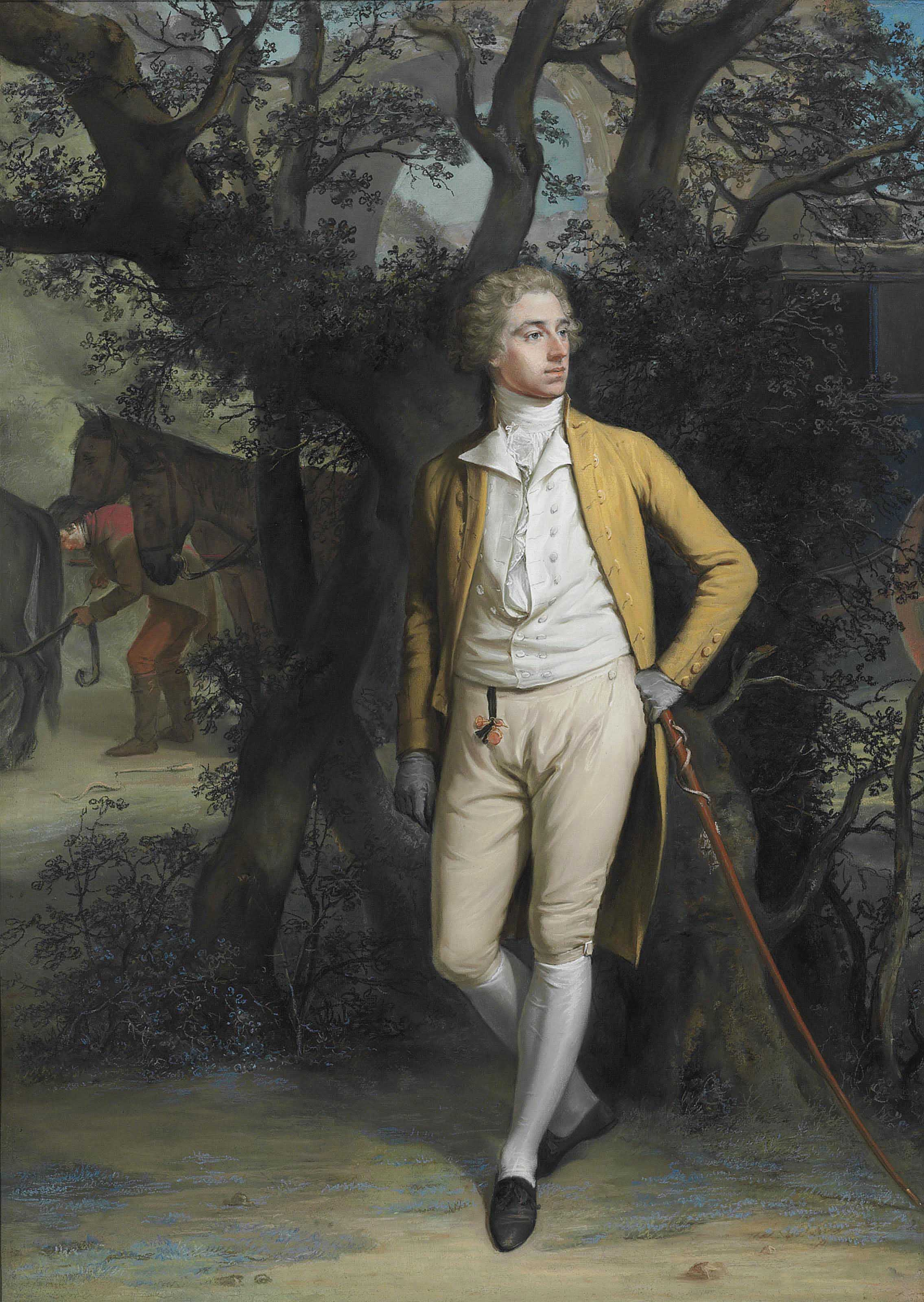
Arthur Hill by Hugh Douglas Hamilton, c. 1785–1790.

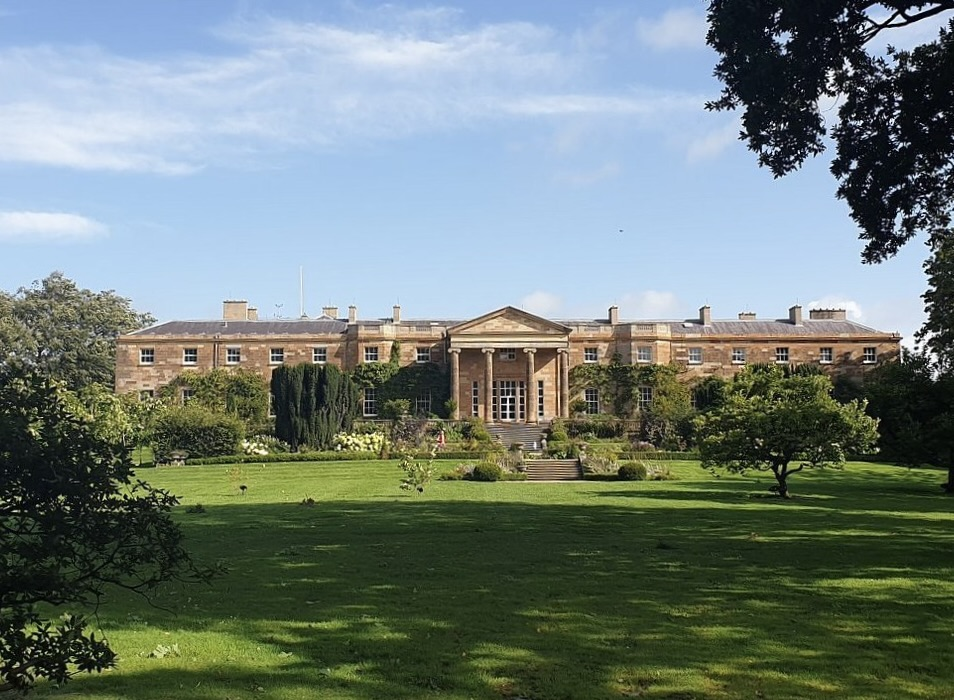
Hillsborough Castle, Northern Ireland (seat of the Marquess of Downshire)

Arthur Hill, 2nd Marquess of Downshire PC, FRS (3 March 1753 – 7 September 1801), styled Viscount Fairford until 1789 and Earl of Hillsborough from 1789 to 1793, was a British peer and MP.

== Life ==
Hill was the eldest son of Wills Hill, 1st Earl of Hillsborough (later Marquess of Downshire) and Lady Margaretta Fitzgerald . He matriculated at Magdalen College, Oxford in 1771, and received his M.A. in 1773. There is evidence that he subsequently spent time at the Royal Academy of Equitation in Lyon, living in the family home of its master, Jean François Charpentier.

Hill sat as a Tory for the rotten borough of Lostwithiel from 1774 to 1780, and then for Malmesbury until 1784. He also represented County Down in the Irish House of Commons from 1776 until succeeding to the peerage in 1793.

Hill enjoyed a number of civil and military appointments in both England and Ireland during this period. He was commissioned a captain in the Hertfordshire Militia on 22 March 1775, and a lieutenant-colonel in the regiment on 4 May 1787, resigning his commission on 4 June 1794. Appointed the deputy governor of County Down on 6 August 1779, he was pricked as High Sheriff of the county in 1785. Hillsborough, as he then was, was chosen a Fellow of the Royal Society on 22 January 1790 and a deputy lieutenant of Berkshire on 12 May 1792.

In his will, made around 1787, Jean François Charpentier appointed Hill as trustee and guardian of his wife, daughter and son, a role he assumed after Charpentier's death, probably in the following year. Charpentier's daughter Charlotte remained his ward until her marriage to the Scottish author Walter Scott in 1797.

Upon the death of his father on 7 October 1793, Hill succeeded him as Marquess of Downshire, in the Peerage of Ireland, as well as in his other subsidiary titles, including that of Earl of Hillsborough in the Peerage of Great Britain. He also succeeded his father as Hereditary Constable of Hillsborough Fort, and as Custos Rotulorum of County Down (16 October) and Governor of Down (17 October). On 7 November, he was appointed to the Privy Council of Ireland.

Downshire vigorously exerted himself against the Union of Great Britain and Ireland in 1800, and was punished by the government for his opposition by being dismissed from the Governorship of Down and the colonelcy of the Downshire Militia, and struck off the roll of the Privy Council, on 12 February 1800. He died by suicide on 7 September 1801.

Hill had an estimated income of £40,000 a year.

== Family ==
On 29 June 1786, he married the great heiress Mary Sandys, by whom he had seven children:

- Arthur Blundell Sandys Trumbull Hill, 3rd Marquess of Downshire (1788–1845)
- Lt.-Gen. Arthur Moyses William Hill, 2nd Baron Sandys (1792–1860)
- Lady Charlotte Hill (15 July 1794 – 30 September 1821)
- Lady Mary Hill (8 July 1796 – 24 May 1830)
- Arthur Marcus Cecil Sandys, 3rd Baron Sandys (1798–1863)
- Lord Arthur Augustus Edwin Hill (13 Aug 1800 – 10 July 1831)
- Major Lord George Augusta Hill (9 December 1801 – 6 April 1879)

His last son, Lord George Hill, was born posthumously, as Downshire died by suicide on 7 September 1801. His widow, Mary, felt his early death was in part due to his humiliation by the Government, and thereafter was a bitter enemy to Robert Stewart, Viscount Castlereagh. She was the heiress of her uncle, Edwin Sandys, 2nd Baron Sandys, and to the estates of her grandfather, William Trumbull, including Easthampstead Park. In 1802, after Downshire's death, she was created Baroness Sandys, with a special remainder to her younger sons and their heirs male in succession and then to her eldest son and his heirs male.

Hill also had a son, William Arthur Dore-Hill, born in 1778, with his mistress Sarah Dore (who later married William Garrow).

Parliament of Great Britain
Preceded by Henry Cavendish; Charles Brett	Member of Parliament for Lostwithiel; 1774–1780; With: Charles Brett 1774–76; Thomas Potter 1776–80	Succeeded by John St. John; Thomas de Grey
Preceded by Hon. Charles James Fox; William Strahan	Member of Parliament for Malmesbury; 1780–1784; With: Viscount Lewisham 1780; John Calvert 1780–84	Succeeded by The Viscount Melbourne; Viscount Maitland
Parliament of Ireland
Preceded by Roger Hall; Robert Stewart	Member of Parliament for County Down; 1776–1793; With: Robert Stewart 1776–83; Hon. Edward Ward 1783–90; Hon. Robert Stewart 1790–93	Succeeded by Francis Savage; Hon. Robert Stewart
Peerage of Great Britain
Preceded by Wills Hill	Earl of Hillsborough; 1793–1801	Succeeded by Arthur Hill
Peerage of Ireland
Preceded by Wills Hill	Marquess of Downshire; 1793–1801	Succeeded by Arthur Hill
