= Marcus Trevor, 1st Viscount Dungannon =

Anglo-Irish soldier and peer

Arms of Trevor: Party per bend sinister ermine and ermines, a lion rampant or

Marcus Trevor, 1st Viscount Dungannon (1618 – 3 January 1670), also known as Colonel Mark Trevor, was an Anglo-Irish soldier and peer. During the English Civil War and the Interregnum he switched sides several times between the Royalist and Parliamentary forces. Under King Charles II he was a significant force in Ulster and in 1662 was created the first Viscount Dungannon.

== Life ==
Trevor was the son of Sir Edward Trevor of Rostrevor, County Down, and of Brynkinalt Hall, near Chirk in Denbighshire, by his marriage to Rose Ussher, a daughter of Henry Ussher (ca. 1550–1613), Archbishop of Armagh and his first wife Margaret Eliot. He was thus a cousin of a later Archbishop of Armagh, James Ussher (1581–1656), who was Henry's nephew. Thanks to the Irish Rebellion of 1641, Trevor's father was imprisoned in Narrowater Castle, where he remained until 1642 and died soon after being released. In the meantime, Trevor himself, although young, served as one of the king's commanders in County Down. In October 1641 the rebel Con Magennis addressed a letter to Trevor and others.

Following the outbreak of the First English Civil War, late in 1643, Trevor was part of a Royalist force which sailed to England, probably a division sent by the Marquess of Ormonde under Colonel Robert Byron, who garrisoned Chester. On 12 January 1644 he was almost captured by parliamentarian forces led by Colonel Thomas Mytton at Ellesmere. Trevor was soon given command of a regiment of horse, and in July fought at the Battle of Marston Moor, at which he was later claimed to have wounded Oliver Cromwell himself. Trevor's forces next marched into the north-western counties, and in October 1644 he led the defence of Ruthin. The following winter he spent in Cornwall under Ralph Hopton, and on 16 February 1646, Trevor was one of Hopton's officers at the rout of the Battle of Torrington, after which the king's army in the West was broken.

In May 1646, he joined Fairfax at Oxford and took service with Parliament against the Irish rebels. In October 1647 he was in Louth but in June 1649 he deserted, following Monck's treaty with Owen Roe O'Neill, and rejoined the Royalists under Ormonde. On 15 July he defeated Ferral, who was transporting ammunition for O'Neill to Dundalk, then helped in the defence of Drogheda. In November 1649 Trevor was shot in the stomach during a skirmish near Wexford and taken to Kilkenny, where he recovered from his wounds. In March 1649/50 he was chosen by the Irish as Lieutenant-General of horse, but soon afterwards he again changed sides. In November 1654 Oliver Cromwell described him to his son Henry Cromwell as a dangerous man who should be secured in a safe place.

In 1658 Trevor was trying to persuade others to support the future King Charles II, and before the Restoration, he was again firmly in the royalist camp. On 6 December 1660 the new king appointed him Ranger of Ulster, with a grant of twelve hundred acres in the Liberty of Dundalk and a further six hundred acres near Carlingford, County Louth. He also joined the Privy Council of Ireland.

On 28 August 1662, Trevor was created Viscount Dungannon of Tyrone and Baron Trevor of Rostrevor and in 1664 he was appointed as Governor of County Down. In a letter of 1668, Ormonde congratulated Dungannon on "setting distrust and enmity betwixt the Irish".

He died at Dundalk on 3 January 1669/70 and was buried at Clanallin, near Rostrevor.

His first wife was Frances, daughter and coheir of Sir Marmaduke Whitechurch. His second was Anne, widow of John Owen of Orieltown. On 27 March 1686, two of his sons matriculated at Christ Church, Oxford, and on 31 December 1687 John, the elder, was accidentally shot by his younger brother, Marcus Trevor. It was yet another son, Lewis Trevor, who succeeded his father.

== Notes ==
Peerage of Ireland
New creation	Viscount Dungannon; 1st creation 1662–1670	Succeeded by Lewis Trevor
