= Arthur George Hill =

British organ builder (1857–1923)

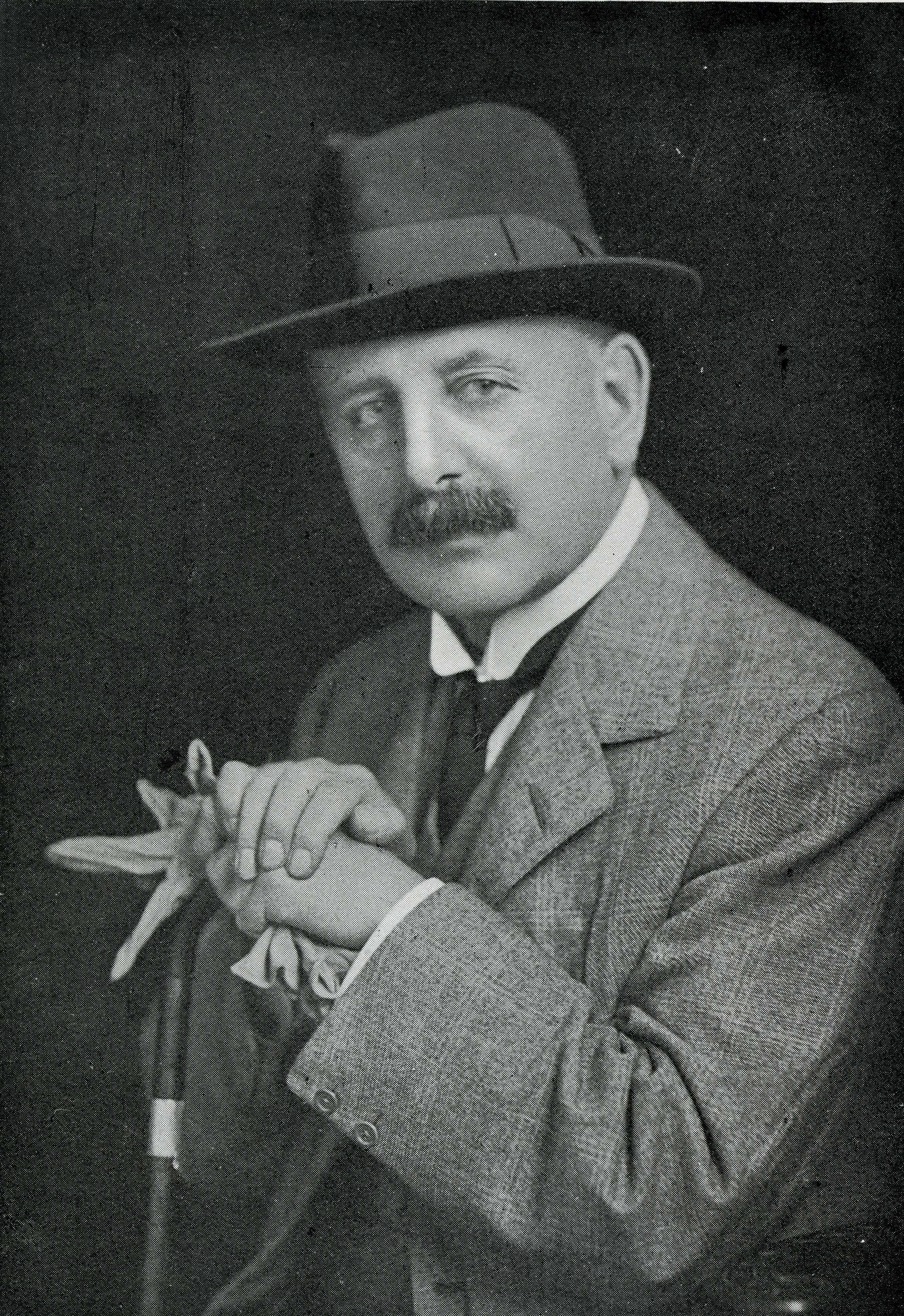
Hill, pictured in The Organ, October 1923

Arthur George Hill (12 November 1857 – 16 June 1923) was a British organ builder.

== Life ==
Hill was born to Thomas Hill and Mary Sophie, who was the daughter of Rev. Charles Thorold, Rector of Ludborough, Lincolnshire. He was educated at the Westminster School and subsequently went to take a degree in the Natural Science Tripos at Jesus College, Cambridge. He took an interest in archaeology and architecture and published several books about Cambridgeshire. In 1882 he became a fellow of the Society of Antiquaries. He married Amy Williams in 1886 with whom he had two daughters.

When he left Cambridge he began work at the organ building company, William Hill & Sons, founded by his grandfather William Hill. Thomas Hill had been the head of the company since William's death in 1871, and when Thomas died in 1893 Arthur took over. He led the company until its merger with the firm of Norman and Beard in 1916.

He became a Docteur des lettres at the University of Lille in 1913 on a thesis called Christian Art in Spain.

In June 1923 he fell ill with pneumonia and died shortly thereafter.

== Publications ==
- Christian art in Spain (1913), doctoral dissertation
- The architectural history of the Christian church (1908)
- The organ-cases and organs of the Middle Ages and Renaissance (1883)
- The tourist's guide to Cambridgeshire (1882)
- The churches of Cambridgeshire (1880)
