= Edward Trevor =

Member of the Welsh Trevor dynasty

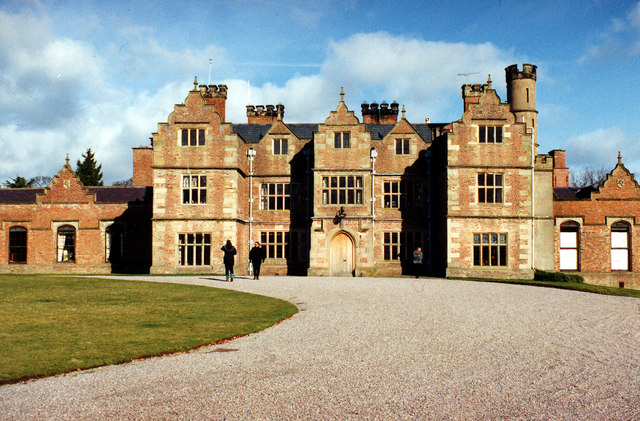
Brynkinalt Hall, Chirk

Sir Edward Trevor (c. 1580–1642) was the founder of the fortunes of the Trevor dynasty, a major family of Denbighshire. He was the son of Robert Trevor and Katherine ap Llewellyn, and the grandson of Edward Trevor. His first wife was Anne Balle, daughter of Nicholas Balle.

While on military service in Ireland, in 1612 Edward Trevor married as his second wife Rose, a daughter of Henry Ussher, Archbishop of Armagh and his first wife Margaret Elliott, and acquired an estate in County Down which was renamed Rostrevor, incorporating his own name. He was knighted in 1617 and built the mansion of Brynkynallt on his estates at Chirk in 1619.

Archbishop Ussher appointed him joint executor of his will in 1613, together with his brother-in-law Sir John Elliott, Baron of the Court of Exchequer (Ireland).

In 1622 he was appointed High Sheriff of Denbighshire.

In 1641 Trevor was captured and imprisoned by Irish rebels, and he died in captivity.

Trevor was the builder of Brynkinalt Hall near Chirk in Wales.

== Children ==
His son Marcus Trevor was a soldier of the English Civil War and following the English Restoration of 1660 was created Viscount Dungannon.

He had three other sons:

- John, who was the father of Sir John Trevor, Speaker of the House of Commons
- Arthur
- Edward,

and at least one daughter Eva, who married William Fitton of Awrice, County Limerick and was the mother of Sir Alexander Fitton, Lord Chancellor of Ireland.
