= Nicholas Hill, 9th Marquess of Downshire =

British peer, landowner, and accountant (born 1959)

Arthur Francis Nicholas Wills Hill, 9th Marquess of Downshire (born 4 February 1959), is a British peer in the peerage of Ireland and landowner in Yorkshire.

== Early life ==
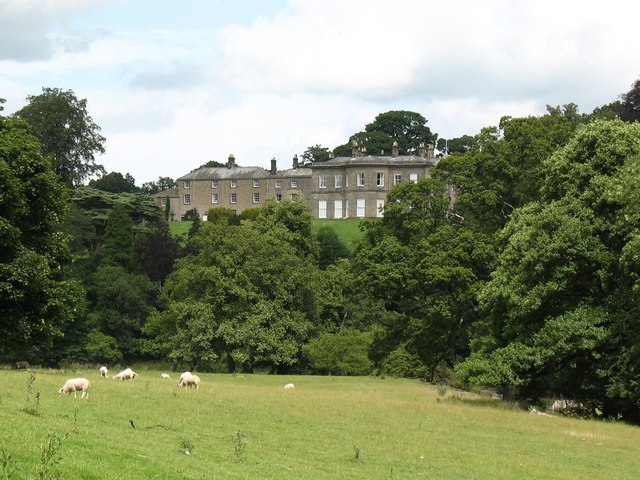
Clifton Castle

The Marquess of Downshire was born in 1959, the son of Robin Hill, 8th Marquess of Downshire. About 1970, his father bought the Clifton Castle estate, near Masham in North Yorkshire, which became the family's main home.

The young Hill studied farm management at the Royal Agricultural College, Cirencester, gaining a diploma in Advanced Farm Management, and went on to qualify as a chartered accountant.

He was styled as Earl of Hillsborough after his father succeeded as Marquess of Downshire in 1989.

== Career ==
Hill was with Touche Ross from 1981 to 1987 and spent some twenty years working in finance and venture capital in London. In 2001, he returned to Masham to take over from his father the management of the Clifton and Jervaulx estates. In 2003 he succeeded his father as the Marquess of Downshire and inherited the estates.

In May 2011, Lord Downshire launched an annual Northern grassland event at Clifton Castle Farms. He was then making 3,000 tonnes of silage a year. In 2014 he was farming some 700 acres of the Clifton Castle estate in hand. Some 250 acres were arable, growing mainly wheat, barley and oats. He had by then given up on a large dairying operation, which had proved to need too much new investment, but had diversified by creating biomass boilers and a hydro-electric power scheme. As well as quarrying and forestry interests, and ten tenanted farms on the two estates, he also owned the Blue Lion pub at East Witton, named as "best dining inn" in the Good Pub Guide for 2014.

In March 2014 Lord Downshire became chairman of the Country Landowners' Association in Yorkshire and also joined the policy committee of the national organization. He commented to The Yorkshire Post "Estate owning is a long-term business, and any decision I make is trying to look fifty years forward, rather than a few months."

He has been a member of the board of the Moorland Association since it was formed in 2014 and was its Chairman for three years. In 2018 he became a member of the Council of the Duchy of Lancaster and was still a member in 2023.

In 2023, a new boutique guest house called Arthur's was opened in Hillsborough, in honour of Lord Downshire.

He leads a private army, the Hillsborough Fort Guard, which was established by an ancestor in 1660. He commented to the BBC in 2025 "There is nearly 400 years of history in this Guard".

== Personal life ==
Lord Downshire married Diana Jane Bunting, daughter of Gerald Leeson Bunting, a solicitor, of Otterington House, Northallerton, and they have four children, three daughters and a son. Their daughter Lady Georgina Anderson is a chef in Harrogate and their son Edmund Robin Arthur Hill, Earl of Hillsborough (born 1996) is heir apparent.

The family lives mostly at Clifton Castle.

In 2013, Lord Downshire inherited another peerage, that of Baron Sandys, from a distant cousin, Richard Hill, 7th Baron Sandys.

In June 2022 the grounds of the castle were opened as part of the National Garden Scheme in Wensleydale.

== Notes ==
Peerage of Ireland
Preceded by Robin Hill	Marquess of Downshire; 2003–present	Incumbent
Peerage of the United Kingdom
Preceded by Richard Hill	Baron Sandys; 2013–present	Incumbent
Orders of precedence in the United Kingdom
Preceded by The Marquess of Waterford	Gentlemen	Succeeded by The Marquess of Donegall
