= Royal Berkshire Archives =

County record office in Berkshire, England

Coordinates: 51°27′1.02″N 0°58′54.26″W

The Royal Berkshire Archives is the record office for the county of Berkshire in the United Kingdom. It is located in Reading. It opened as the Berkshire Record Office on 10 August 1948 in The Forbury, Reading. It moved to the new Shire Hall beside the M4 in 1981, and to its present home in Coley Avenue, Reading, in 2000. On 10 August 2023, its 75th anniversary, the record office was renamed to Royal Berkshire Archives.
