= Arthur Hill, 6th Marquess of Downshire =

Irish peer

Arthur Wills John Wellington Trumbull Blundell Hill, 6th Marquess of Downshire (2 July 1871, London – 29 May 1918) was an Irish peer, styled Earl of Hillsborough until 31 March 1874. He lived chiefly at the family seat, Easthampstead Park, within 5,000 acres in Berkshire. The marquess also owned 115,000 acres in Hillsborough, County Down, and land in Wicklow and Kildare.

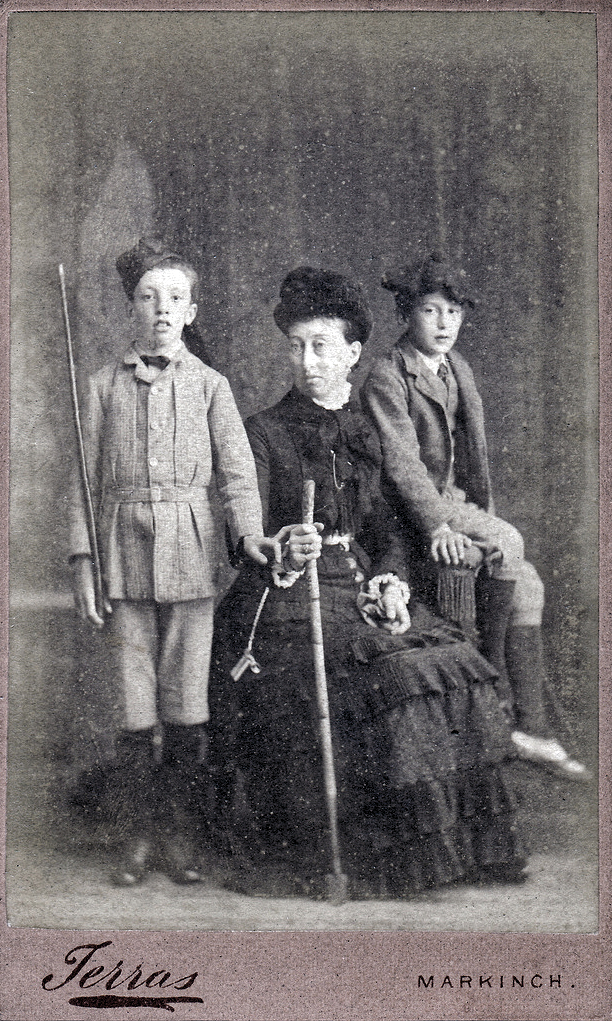
Arthur Hill, 6th Marquess of Downshire (left) c.1880

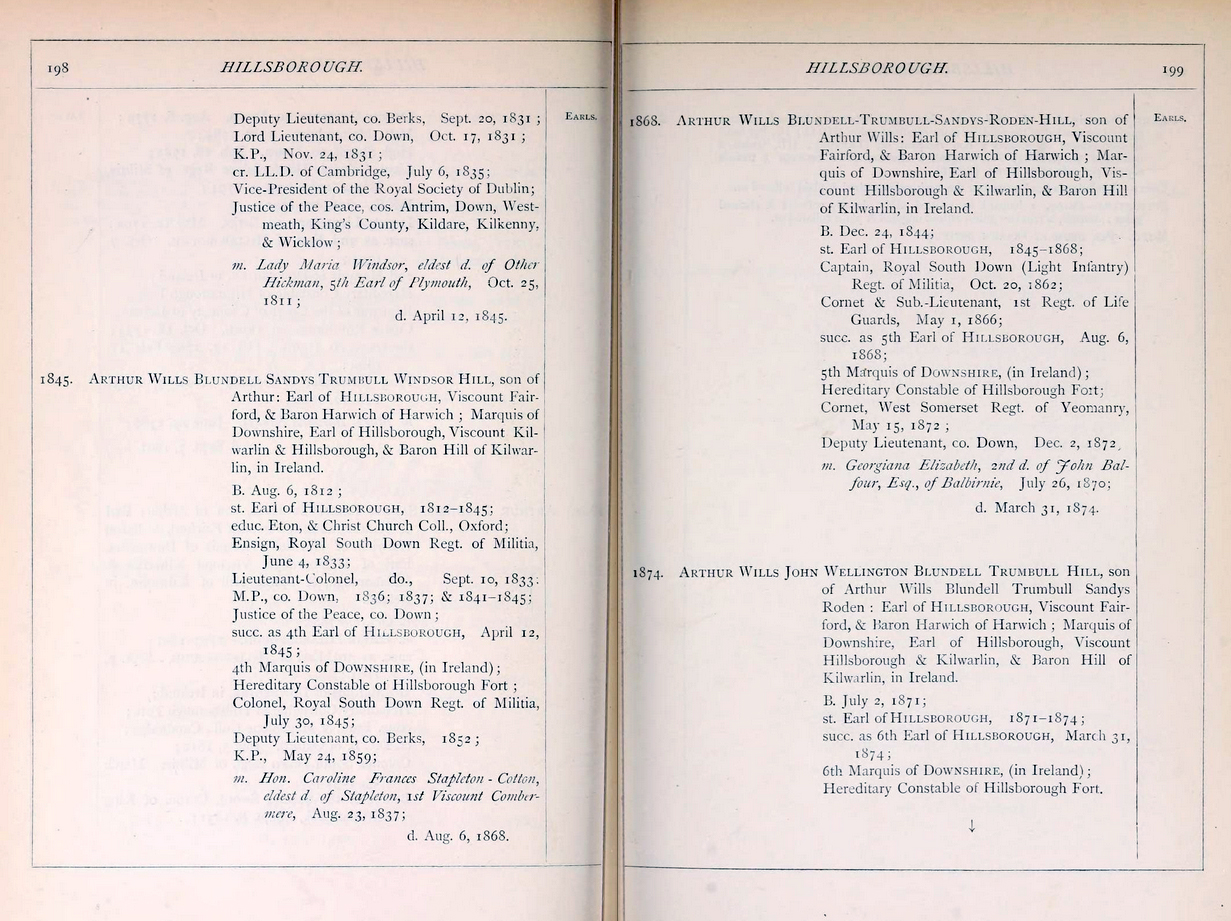
Marquess of Downshire in The Official Baronage of England, v. 2 (1886)

Arthur Hill was son of Arthur Hill, 5th Marquess of Downshire (1844–1874), and Georgiana Elizabeth Balfour (died 12 January 1919), daughter of Colonel John Balfour of Balbirnie (1811–1895) and Lady Georgiana Isabel (Campbell) Balfour (died 3 December 1884). He became Marquess of Downshire in 1874 on the death of his father.

On 22 June 1893 he married Katherine Mary ("Kitty") Hare (1872–1959), a granddaughter of William Hare, 2nd Earl of Listowel, at St Peter's Church, Eaton Square, London. Kitty became the Marchioness of Downshire. They had three children:

- Arthur Wills Percy Wellington Blundell Trumbull Sandys Hill (7 Apr 1894 – 28 Mar 1989), 7th Marquess of Downshire from 29 May 1918
- Lord Arthur Francis Henry Hill (28 Aug 1895 – 25 Dec 1953)
- Lady Kathleen Nina Hill (15 Sep 1898 – 30 Nov 1960), mother of Primula Rollo, first wife of actor David Niven.

During the 1899-1900 hunting season in Leicestershire, his wife Kitty Hare, considered a society beauty, became acquainted with Joseph Frederick (Joe) Laycock, a millionaire soldier from Wiseton in Nottinghamshire. The relationship developed into an adulterous affair which resulted in Arthur Hill obtaining a divorce from his wife in 1902. After the divorce Laycock married Kitty. Laycock was already having an affair with Kitty's married friend Daisy Greville, Countess of Warwick before he met her, which had already produced one child; this affair carried-on after his marriage to Kitty, producing a further child to the Countess. Following his divorce from Kitty Hare, Arthur Hill married Evelyn Grace Mary Foster (died 30 December 1942), daughter of Edmund Benson Foster (died 1 November 1917), and Edith Eleanor Grove (died 29 November 1921) daughter of Sir Thomas Grove, 1st Baronet.

Throughout his life Arthur Hill was considered locally as somewhat eccentric but down-to-earth, occasionally dressing down to fit in with and follow the drovers from Easthampstead Park taking livestock to market. He had a keen interest in powered vehicles such as steam engines and motor cars, and was "chief of Wokingham's voluntary fire service"

Arthur Hill, 6th Marquess died at Easthampstead Park on 29 May 1918, and was buried there.

Peerage of Ireland
Preceded by Arthur Hill	Marquess of Downshire; 1874–1918	Succeeded by Arthur Hill
