= Georg Rudolf Weckherlin =

German poet and diplomat

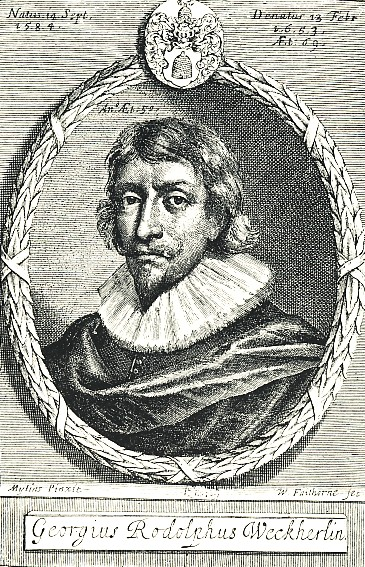
Georg Rudolf Weckherlin.

Georg Rudolf Weckherlin (15 September 1584 – 13 February 1653) was a German poet and diplomat. Influenced by the French La Pléiade, his poetry introduced Renaissance forms and themes previously unknown in German verse.

In his political career, Weckherlin worked in the service of the Electorate of the Palatinate, serving on diplomatic missions to France and England. Weckherlin would eventually come to be employed by the English crown as an expert on foreign languages and cryptography, and continued to serve in this position in the Commonwealth of England.

== Biography ==
Georg Weckherlin was born at Stuttgart. After studying law in Tübingen he settled at Stuttgart, and, as secretary to Duke Johann Friedrich of Württemberg, was employed on diplomatic missions to France and England.

Between 1620 and 1624 he lived in England in the service of the Electorate of the Palatinate, and from this connection came to be employed in various positions in the English government. He was chief clerk to a succession of Secretaries of State and was especially skilled in foreign languages and cryptology. He acted as a licenser of London foreign news publications for Charles I and in the mid-1630s he assisted with the negotiations for the development of an offensive and defensive treaty with France that would have brought Britain directly into the Thirty Years' War. Although employed by the English crown, when civil war came in 1642, Weckherlin chose to remain in London and serve the bureaucracy that supported the Long Parliament. In 1644 he was appointed "Secretary for Foreign Tongues" in England, a position in which, on the establishment of the Commonwealth, he was followed by Milton. His son had a position in the household of Charles I's oldest son Prince Charles and went into exile with the royalists. He did not return to England until 1660 after the death of his father in 1653 in London.

Weckherlin was the most distinguished of the circle of South German poets who prepared the way for the Renaissance movement associated in Germany with Martin Opitz. His models were the poets of the French Pleiade, and with his psalms, odes and sonnets he broke new ground for the German lyric. An epic poem on the death of Gustavus Adolphus, in alexandrines, seems to have won most favor with his contemporaries.

== Works ==
Two volumes of his Oden und Gesänge appeared in 1618 and 1619; his collected Geistliche und weltliche Gedichte in 1641. Weckherlin's Gedichte (Poems) have been edited by Hermann Fischer for the Stuttgarter Literarischer Verein (vols. cxcix.-cc., 1894–1895). Selections were published by W. Müller (1823) and Karl Goedeke (1873).

His chief English poems were "Triumphal Shows Set Forth Lately at Stuttgart" (1616) and "Panegyricke to Lord Hay, Viscount of Doncaster" (James Hay, 1st Earl of Carlisle) (1619).
