= Arthur Hill, 7th Marquess of Downshire =

Irish peer

Arthur Wills Percy Wellington Blundell Trumbull Hill, 7th Marquess of Downshire (7 April 1894 – 28 March 1989) was an Irish peer. He lived chiefly at the family seat, Easthampstead Park within 5,000 acres in Berkshire, until the estate was sold to Berkshire County Council after the Second World War. Up to the 1920s he was the last Marquess to have connection with the family mansion with its 115,000 acres of estate in Hillsborough, County Down.

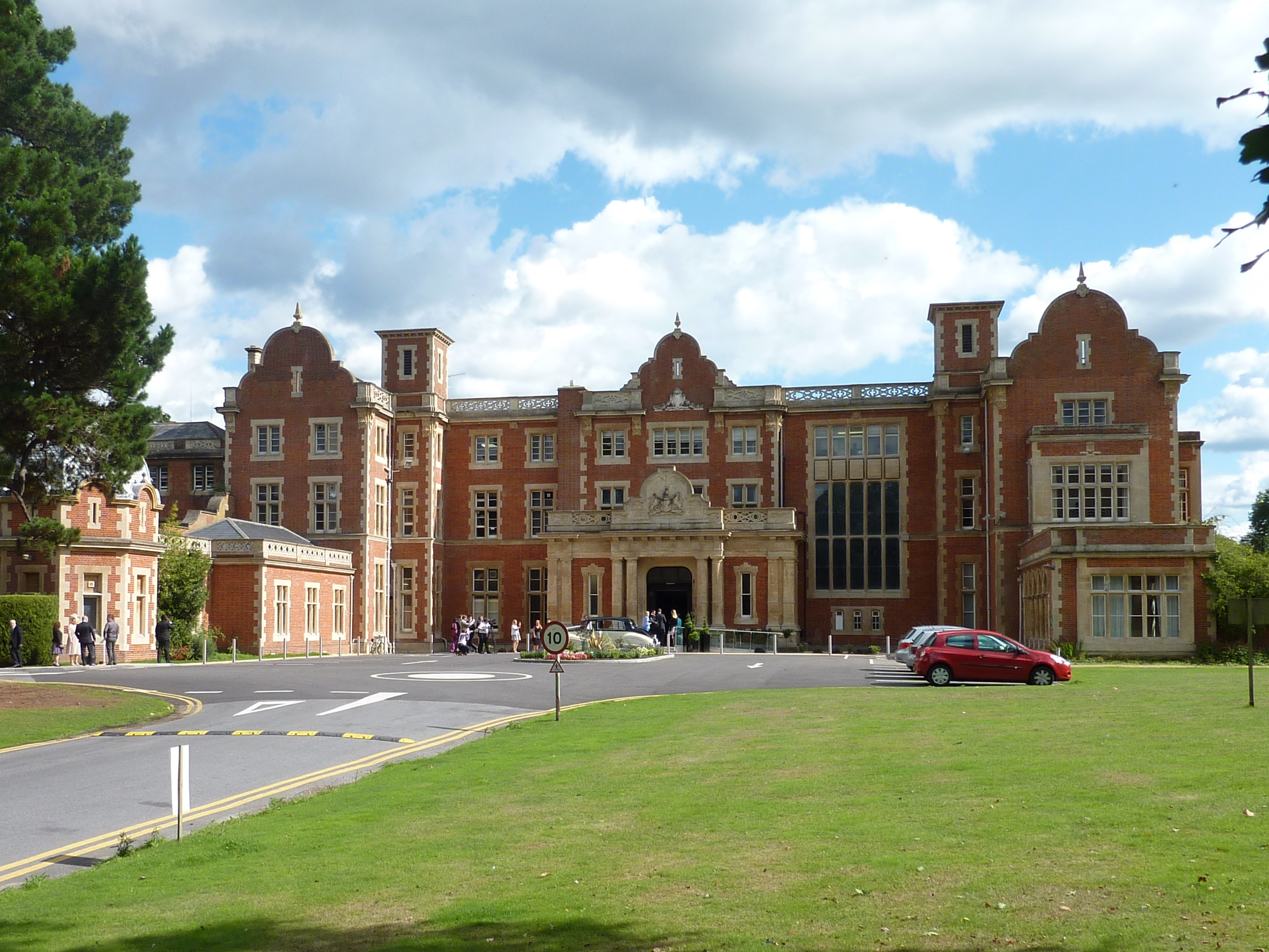
Easthampstead Park

Arthur Hill was son to Arthur Hill, 6th Marquess of Downshire (1871–1918) and Katherine Mary ("Kitty") Hare (1872–1959), a granddaughter to William Hare, 2nd Earl of Listowel.

His siblings were Lord Arthur Francis Henry Hill (1895–1953) and Lady Kathleen Nina Hill (1898–1960). He was also half-brother to Robert Laycock (1907–1968), the son to Joseph (Joe) Lacock and Hill's mother Kitty who had married Laycock in 1902 after being divorced by the 6th Marquess for adultery with Joe Laycock.

Arthur Hill was educated at Eton College. During the First World War he served with the British Red Cross, and became a lieutenant in the Berkshire Yeomanry. He succeeded to the Marquessate in 1918 on the death of his father, also becoming the 8th Baron Hill of Kilwarlin, 8th Viscount Hillsborough, 7th Earl of Hillsborough, 7th Viscount Fairford, 7th Viscount Kilwarlin, and the 7th Lord Harwich, Baron of Harwich. He married Noreen Barraclough, the daughter of William Barraclough on 23 July 1953, her fourth marriage, she becoming Marchioness of Downshire.

As the Earl of Hillsborough, he took his seat in the House of Lords on 18 May 1920, but is not recorded to have ever spoken.

Arthur Hill, 7th Marquess, died on 28 March 1989 aged 94, and was succeeded by his nephew Robin Hill as the 8th Marquess.

Peerage of Ireland
Preceded by Arthur Hill	Marquess of Downshire; 1918–1989	Succeeded by Robin Hill
Peerage of Great Britain
Preceded by Arthur Hill	Earl of Hillsborough; 1918–1989; Member of the House of Lords (1920–1989)	Succeeded by Robin Hill
Honorary titles
Preceded by The Earl of Galloway	Longest-serving member in the House of Lords; 1978–1989	Succeeded by The Earl Amherst
