= Arthur Hill, 4th Marquess of Downshire =

Irish peer (1812–1868)

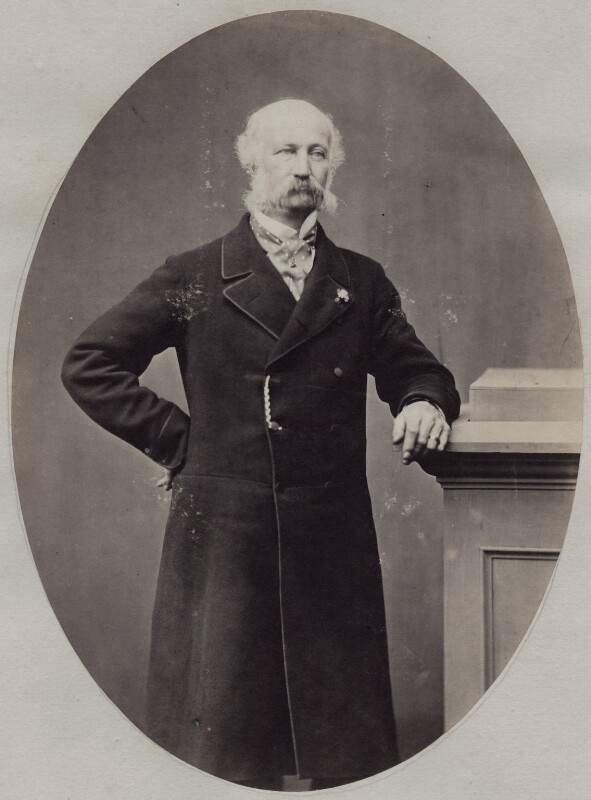
Downshire in the 1860s

Lieutenant Colonel Arthur Wills Blundell Sandys Trumbull Windsor Hill, 4th Marquess of Downshire KP (6 August 1812 – 6 August 1868) was an Irish peer, styled Earl of Hillsborough until 1845.

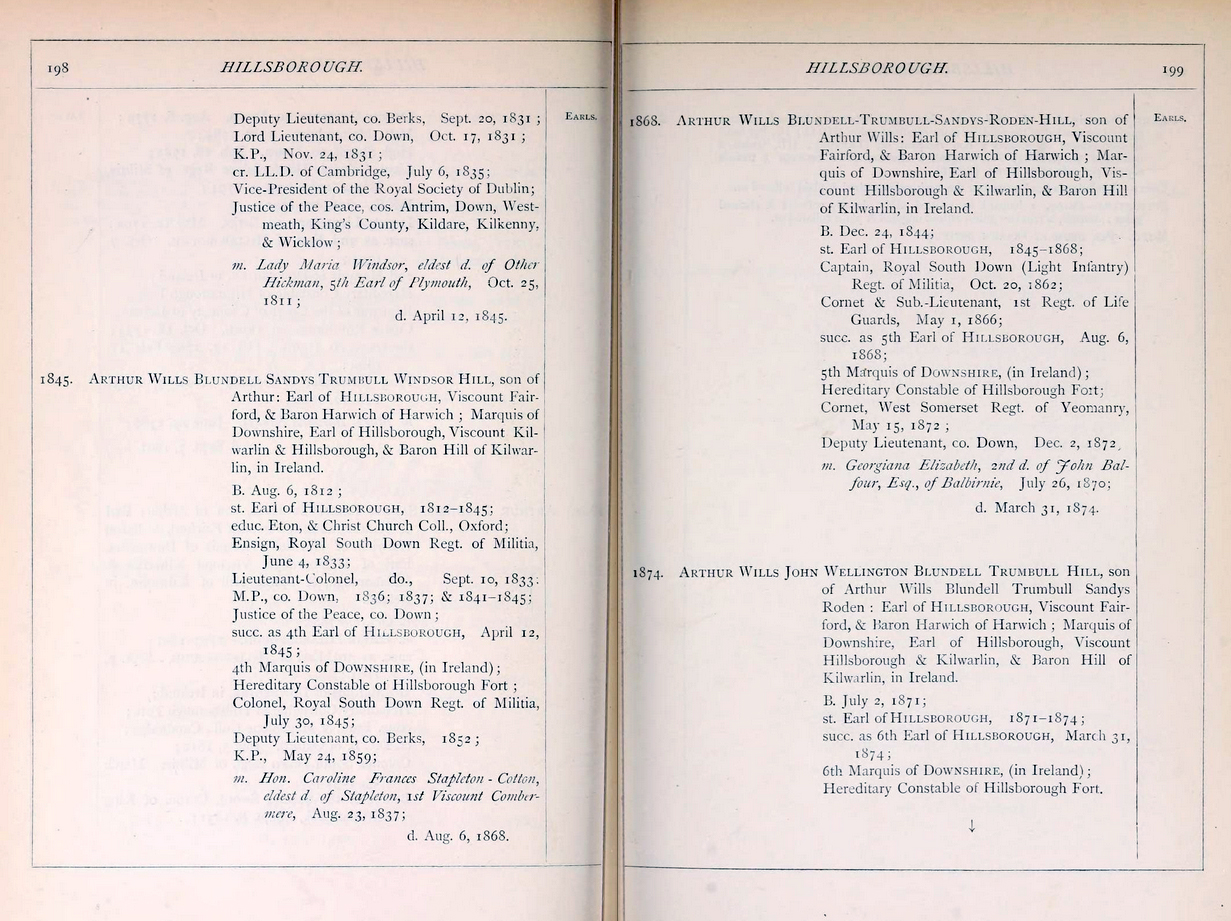
Marquess of Downshire in The Official Baronage of England, v. 2 (1886)

== Life ==
The eldest son of Arthur Hill, 3rd Marquess of Downshire, Hillsborough was educated at Eton and Christ Church, Oxford, where he matriculated in 1830. He was commissioned an ensign in the Royal South Down Militia, of which his father was colonel, on 4 June, and was commissioned lieutenant-colonel in the same on 10 September.

He was appointed Sheriff of County Down for 1834. From 1836 until 1845, he represented Down in Parliament, and was a justice of the peace for the county as well.

He became Marquess of Downshire on 12 April 1845 on the death of his father, and was appointed to his father's Militia colonelcy on 30 July. His English residence was Easthampstead Park in Berkshire, and he was appointed a deputy lieutenant of that county in 1852, and a Knight of the Order of St Patrick on 24 May 1859. He had Easthampstead Church rebuilt in 1867.

== Family ==
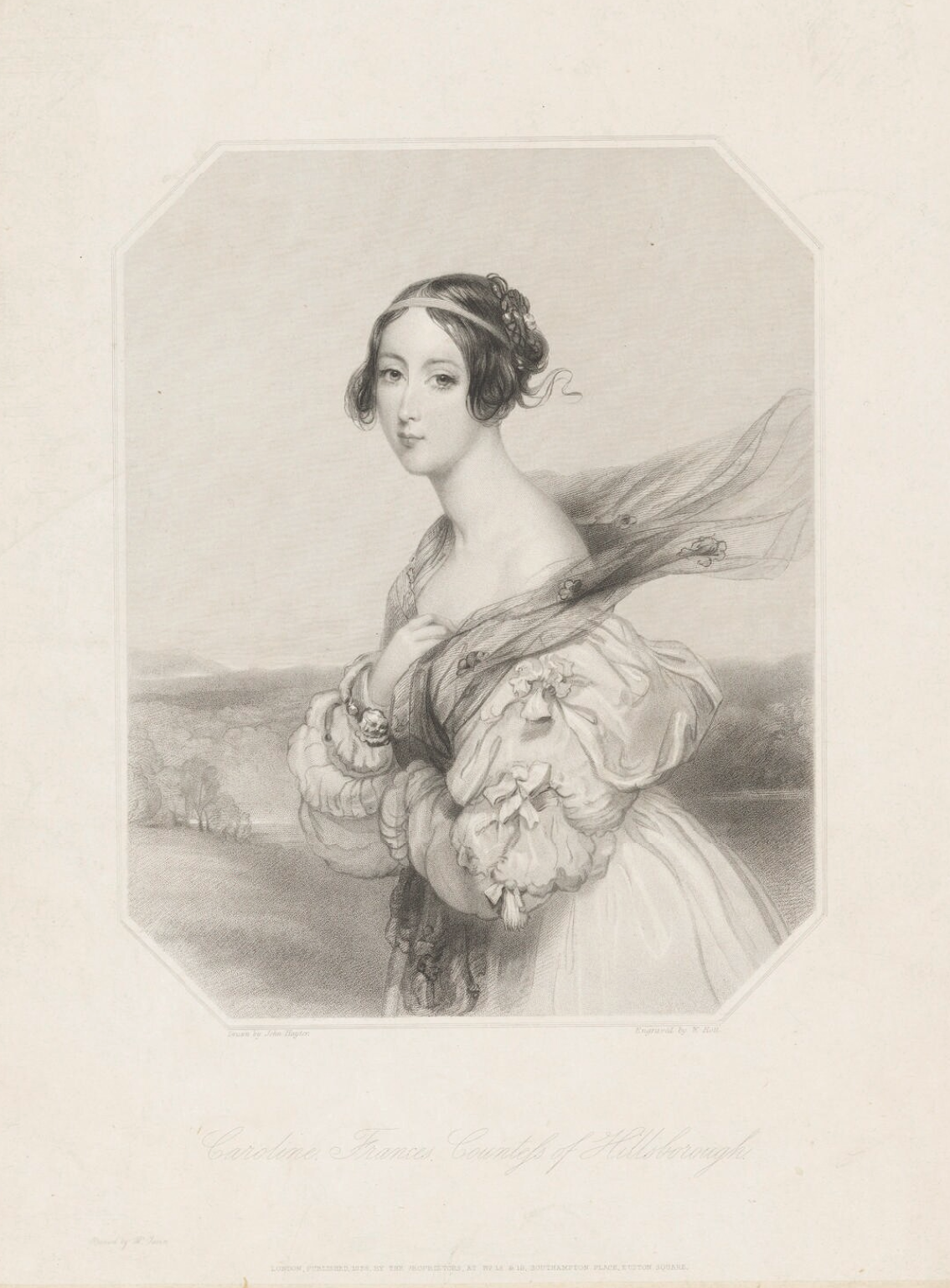
Caroline Frances Hill, 1838 engraving, when her courtesy title was Countess of Hillsborough

On 23 August 1837, Hillsborough married Hon. Caroline Frances Stapleton Cotton, the eldest daughter of Stapleton Cotton, 1st Viscount Combermere. They had four children:

- Arthur Hill, Viscount Kilwarlin (10 June 1841 – 28 June 1841)
- Lady Alice Maria Hill (7 November 1842 – 25 February 1928), married Thomas Taylour, Earl of Bective and had issue
- Arthur Hill, 5th Marquess of Downshire (1844–1874)
- Col. Lord Arthur Hill (1846–1931)

Parliament of the United Kingdom
Preceded by Lord Arthur Hill; Viscount Castlereagh	Member of Parliament for County Down; 1836–1845; With: Viscount Castlereagh	Succeeded by Viscount Castlereagh; Lord Edwin Hill
Peerage of Ireland
Preceded by Arthur Hill	Marquess of Downshire; 1845–1868	Succeeded by Arthur Hill
