= Richard Hill, 7th Baron Sandys =

British Baron (1931–2013)

The Right Honourable The Lord Sandys DL

Deputy Chief Whip of the House of Lords Captain of the Yeomen of the Guard
- In office 6 May 1979 – 20 October 1982
- Monarch: Elizabeth II
- Prime Minister: Margaret Thatcher
- Preceded by: The Lord Strabolgi
- Succeeded by: The Earl of Swinton

Lord-in-waiting Government Whip
- In office 8 January 1974 – 4 March 1974
- Prime Minister: Edward Heath
- Preceded by: The Lord Strathcona and Mount Royal
- Succeeded by: The Lord Jacques

Member of the House of Lords Lord Temporal
- In office 25 November 1961 – 11 November 1999; Hereditary Peerage
- Preceded by: The 6th Lord Sandys
- Succeeded by: Seat abolished

Personal details
- Born: 21 July 1931
- Died: 11 February 2013 (aged 81)
- Party: Conservative
- Education: Royal Naval College, Dartmouth

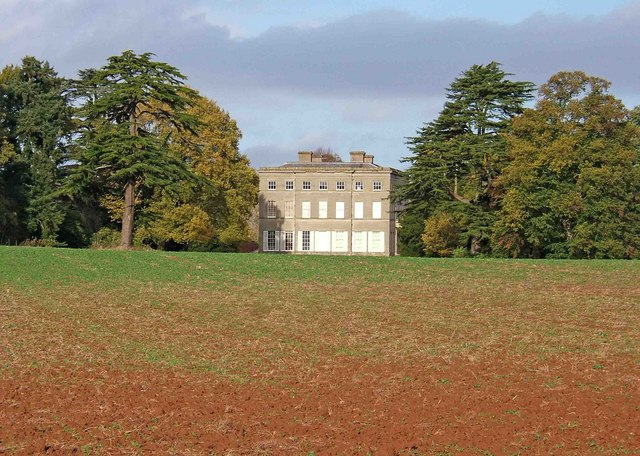
Ombersley Court

Richard Michael Oliver Hill, 7th Baron Sandys DL (21 July 1931 – 11 February 2013), was a British landowner and Conservative politician.

Sandys was the only son of Arthur Fitzgerald Sandys Hill, 6th Baron Sandys, and his wife Cynthia Mary (née Gascoigne), and was educated at the Royal Naval College, Dartmouth. He served with the Royal Scots Greys from 1950 to 1955, achieving the rank of Lieutenant. In 1961, he succeeded his father in the barony and took his seat on the Conservative benches in the House of Lords.

He served under Edward Heath as a Lord-in-waiting (government whip in the House of Lords) in 1974, and was an Opposition Whip in the House of Lords from 1974 to 1979. Between 1979 and 1982, he was Captain of the Yeomen of the Guard (Deputy Chief Whip in the House of Lords) in the first Conservative administration of Margaret Thatcher. Apart from his political career he was also a Deputy Lieutenant of Worcestershire in 1968.

Lord Sandys married Patricia, daughter of Captain Lionel Hall, in 1961. They had no children. Following the death of both Lord Sandys and his wife, the family seat of Ombersley Court was put up for sale.

== Arms ==
Coat of arms of Richard Hill, 7th Baron Sandys

Crest
1st: a Griffin segreant per fess Or and Gules (Sandys); 2nd: a Reindeer's Head couped at the neck Gules attired and plain collared Or (Hill)
Escutcheon
Quarterly: 1st and 4th, Or a Fess dancetty between three Cross Crosslets fitchy Gules (Sandys); 2nd and 3rd, Sable on a Fess Argent between three Leopards passant guardant Or spotted of the field as many Escallops Gules (Hill)
Supporters
On either side a Griffin wings elevated per fess Or and Gules gorged with a Collar dancetty of the last
Motto
Probum Non Paenitet (The honest man has not to repent)

== Notes ==
Political offices
Preceded by The Lord Strabolgi	Captain of the Yeomen of the Guard; 1979–1982	Succeeded by The Earl of Swinton
Peerage of the United Kingdom
Preceded by Arthur Hill	Baron Sandys; 3rd creation 1961–2013	Succeeded by Nicholas Hill
