= Hillsborough Castle =

Castle in Northern Ireland

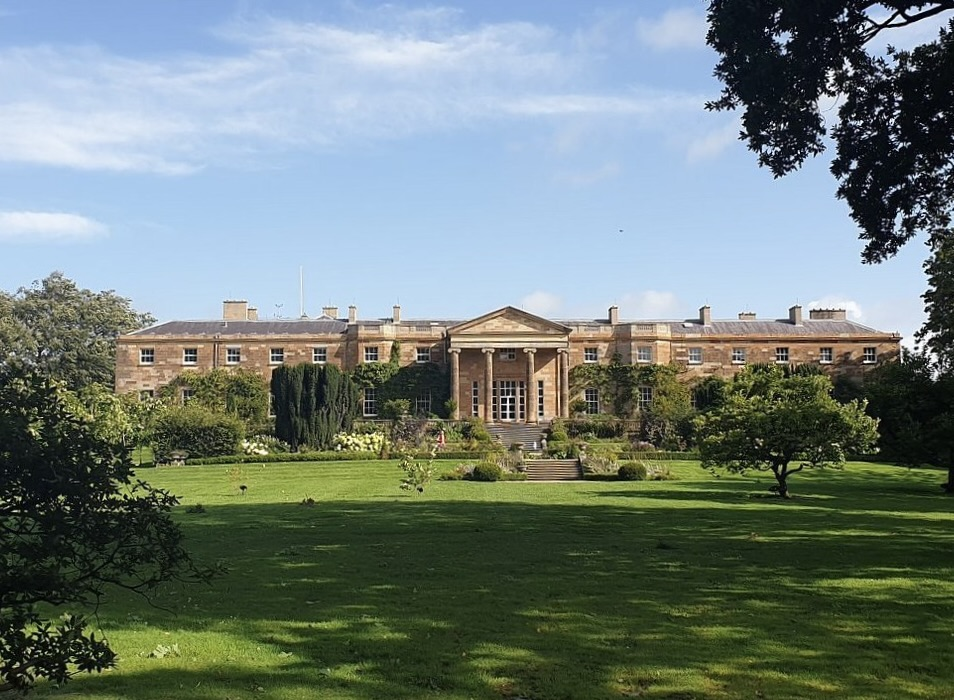
- Hillsborough Castle garden facade

- Location within Northern Ireland

General information
- Location: Royal Hillsborough, County Down, Northern Ireland
- Coordinates: 54.46127°N 6.08604°W
- Owner: King Charles III in right of the Crown

Website
- www.hrp.org.uk

Hillsborough Castle is an official government residence in Northern Ireland. It is the official residence of the Secretary of State for Northern Ireland, and the official residence in Northern Ireland of the British monarch and other members of the British royal family when they visit the region, as well as a guest house for prominent international visitors.

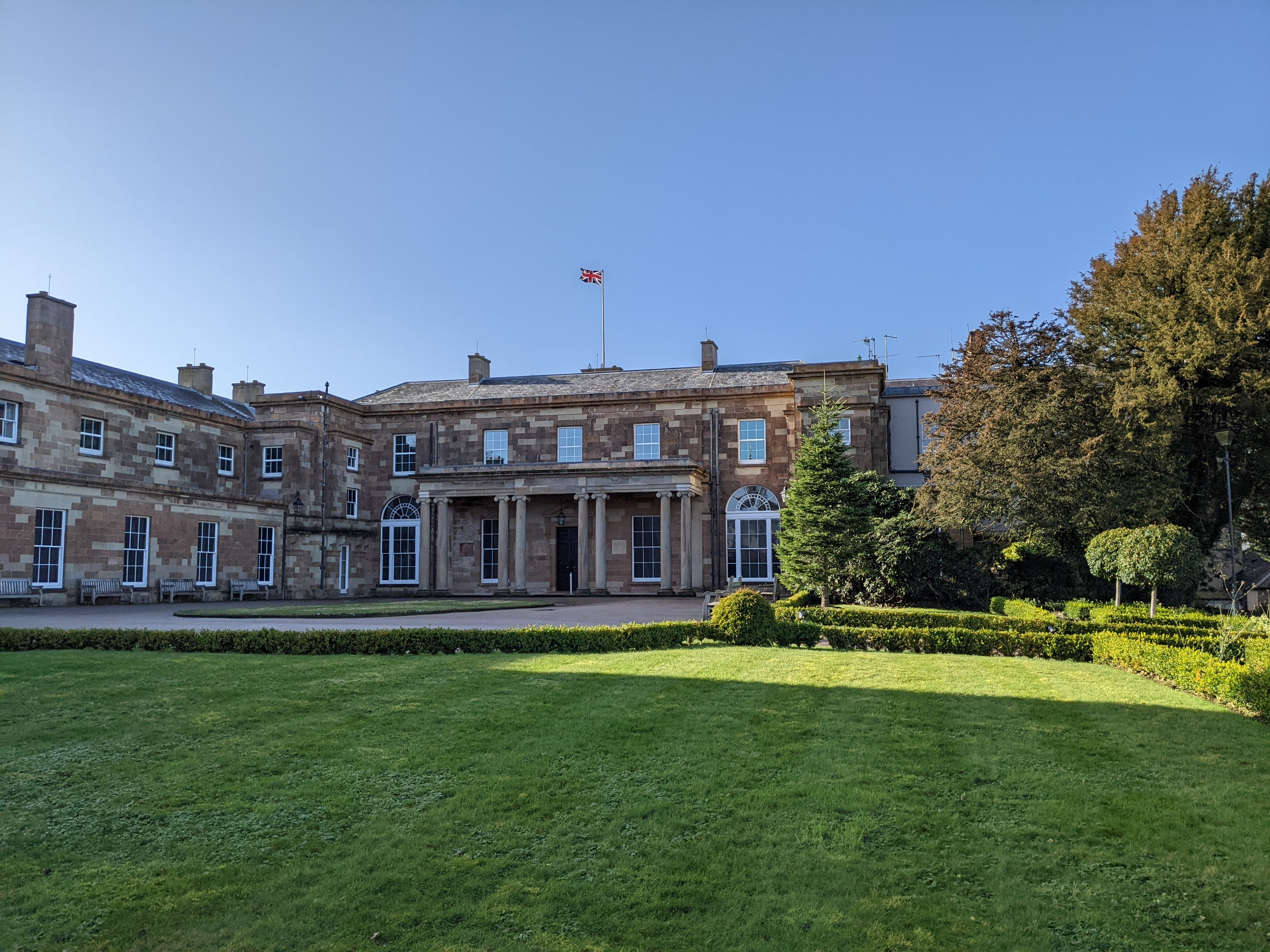
The official entrance of Hillsborough Castle.

From 1924 until the post's abolition in 1973, it was the official residence of the Governor of Northern Ireland. Since April 2014, it has been managed by Historic Royal Palaces, and is open to paying members of the public.

== Early history ==
Hillsborough Castle, which is located in the village of Royal Hillsborough in the north-west of County Down, is not a true castle. It is a Georgian country house built in the 18th century for the Hill family, Marquesses of Downshire, who owned it until 1922, when the 7th Marquess of Downshire sold the mansion and its grounds to the British government. In buying it, the government solved a practical problem. Under the Government of Ireland Act 1920, a new, distinct region of the United Kingdom called Northern Ireland had been created within the traditional province of Ulster, but minus three counties—Cavan, Donegal, and Monaghan—which became part of the Irish Free State. Executive authority had been vested for both Northern Ireland and its sister region, Southern Ireland, in the Lord Lieutenant of Ireland, who was supposed to be one of two all-Ireland features (along with the Council of Ireland) in the new home rule structure. However, that office was abolished in a law change following the Anglo-Irish Treaty of 1921, which in effect aborted Southern Ireland (which had in reality only existed on paper) and established the Irish Free State.

A new office for Northern Ireland alone was created, that of Governor of Northern Ireland. As the Viceregal Lodge in Dublin became unavailable, physically and politically, a new residence was needed. Hillsborough Castle, though outside the largest city of Northern Ireland, Belfast, was deemed a suitable location. After some renovations, the first governor, the 3rd Duke of Abercorn, moved in during 1925. Upon becoming the official residence of the governor, the building was officially renamed Government House.

Within the grounds of the castle are a number of trees planted by residents of, and visitors to, the estate. These include a tree (Abies albertiana) planted by the Duke of Abercorn, the first Governor of Northern Ireland, in October 1925.

== Recent history ==
Following the decision to abolish Northern Ireland's devolved system of government and institute direct rule from London in March 1972, all Northern Irish governmental posts, including that of Governor and Prime Minister of Northern Ireland, were abolished. Those two posts were in effect combined to create the office of Secretary of State for Northern Ireland. As the then Queen's representative, the Secretary of State moved into Hillsborough Castle at that time.

Hillsborough Castle continued to be used for important meetings and conferences; it was the location of the signing of the Anglo-Irish Agreement on 15 November 1985, and Mo Mowlam broke new ground when she opened the extensive grounds of the castle to the public in April 1999. (Note: Following her death on 18 August 2005, Mowlam's ashes were scattered at Hillsborough Castle.)

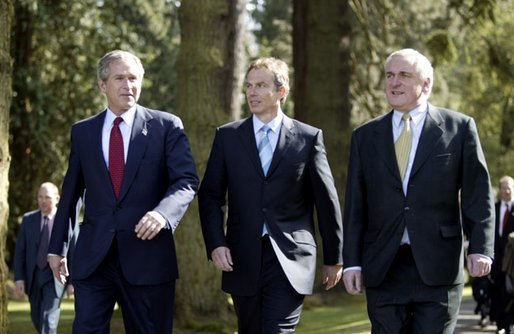
American president George W. Bush, British prime minister Tony Blair and Irish taoiseach Bertie Ahern at Hillsborough Castle on 8 April 2003.

Queen Elizabeth II and Prince Philip, Duke of Edinburgh, stayed in Hillsborough Castle during their visit to Northern Ireland as part of the Golden Jubilee tour of the United Kingdom in 2002. and the President of the United States, George W. Bush, visited the castle in 2003.

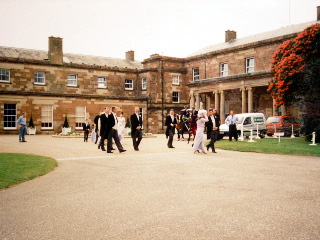
Guests leaving Hillsborough Castle to walk through its grounds.

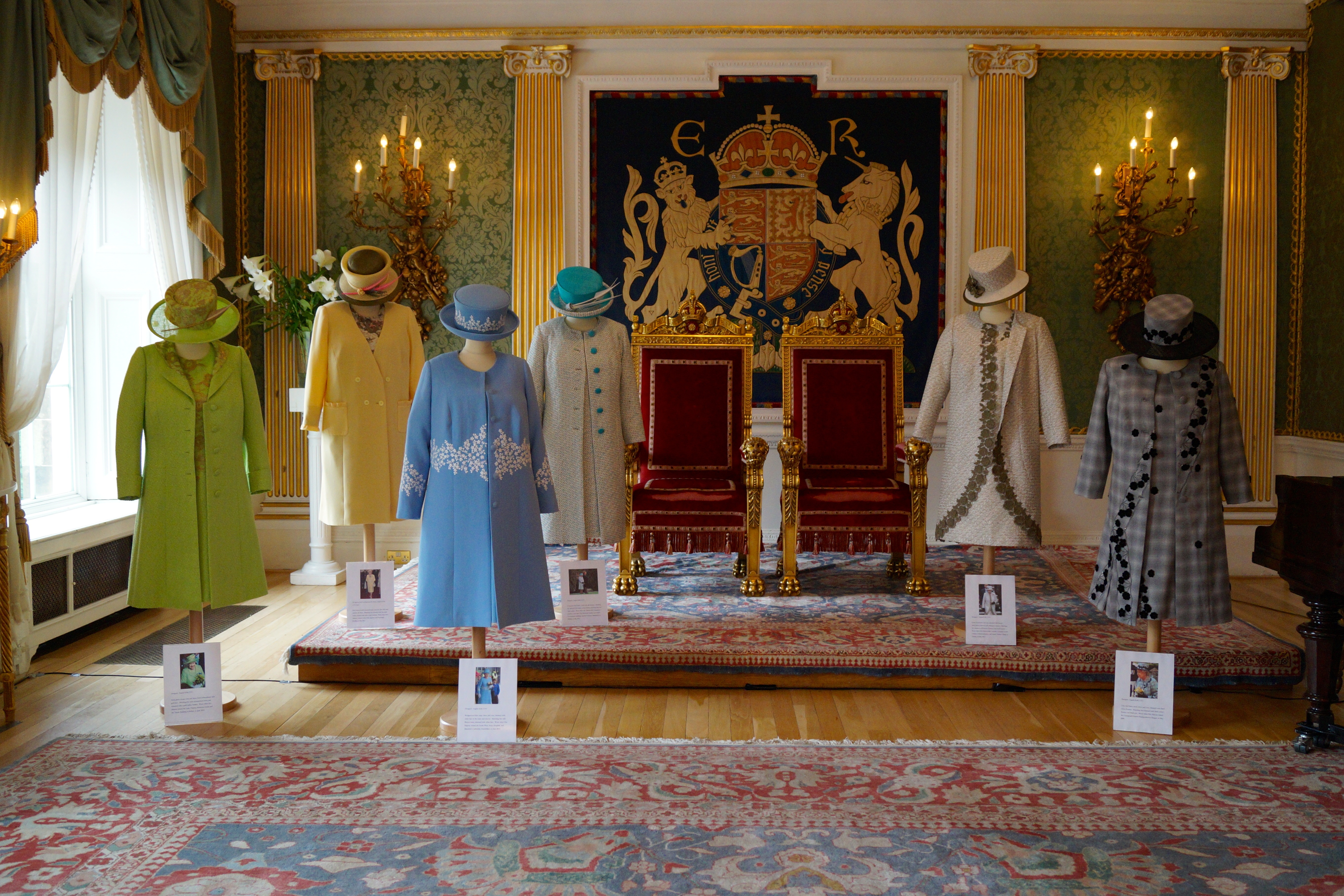
Elizabeth II's clothes exhibition 2013.

The house was also used in January 2010 for talks between British Prime Minister Gordon Brown, Irish Taoiseach Brian Cowen and representatives of the Democratic Unionist Party (DUP) and Sinn Féin on the crisis over Northern Irish policing, which threatened to derail power-sharing and to collapse the Northern Ireland Executive. Then, in April 2014, the then Prince of Wales held an investiture at Hillsborough Castle, the first one to be held in Northern Ireland since the venue became a royal residence.

On 13 September 2022, King Charles III visited the castle with Queen Camilla and responded to an official message of condolence from the Northern Ireland Executive.

== See also ==
- Northern Ireland Office
- Stormont House
- Castles in Northern Ireland
- List of palaces in the United Kingdom

== Bibliography ==
- Cornforth, John, 'Hillsborough Castle, County Down'. Country Life (28 July and 4 August 1994)
- 'Hillsborough Castle, Co Down: Built for peace with a timely restoration', Country Life, 20 October 2019
- Murdoch, Tessa (ed.) (2022). Great Irish Households: Inventories from the Long Eighteenth Century. Cambridge: John Adamson, inventory of 1746, pp. 123–8; inventory of 1777, pp. 137–45 ISBN 978-1-898565-17-8 OCLC 1233305993
