= Arthur Hill, 3rd Marquess of Downshire =

Anglo-Irish peer

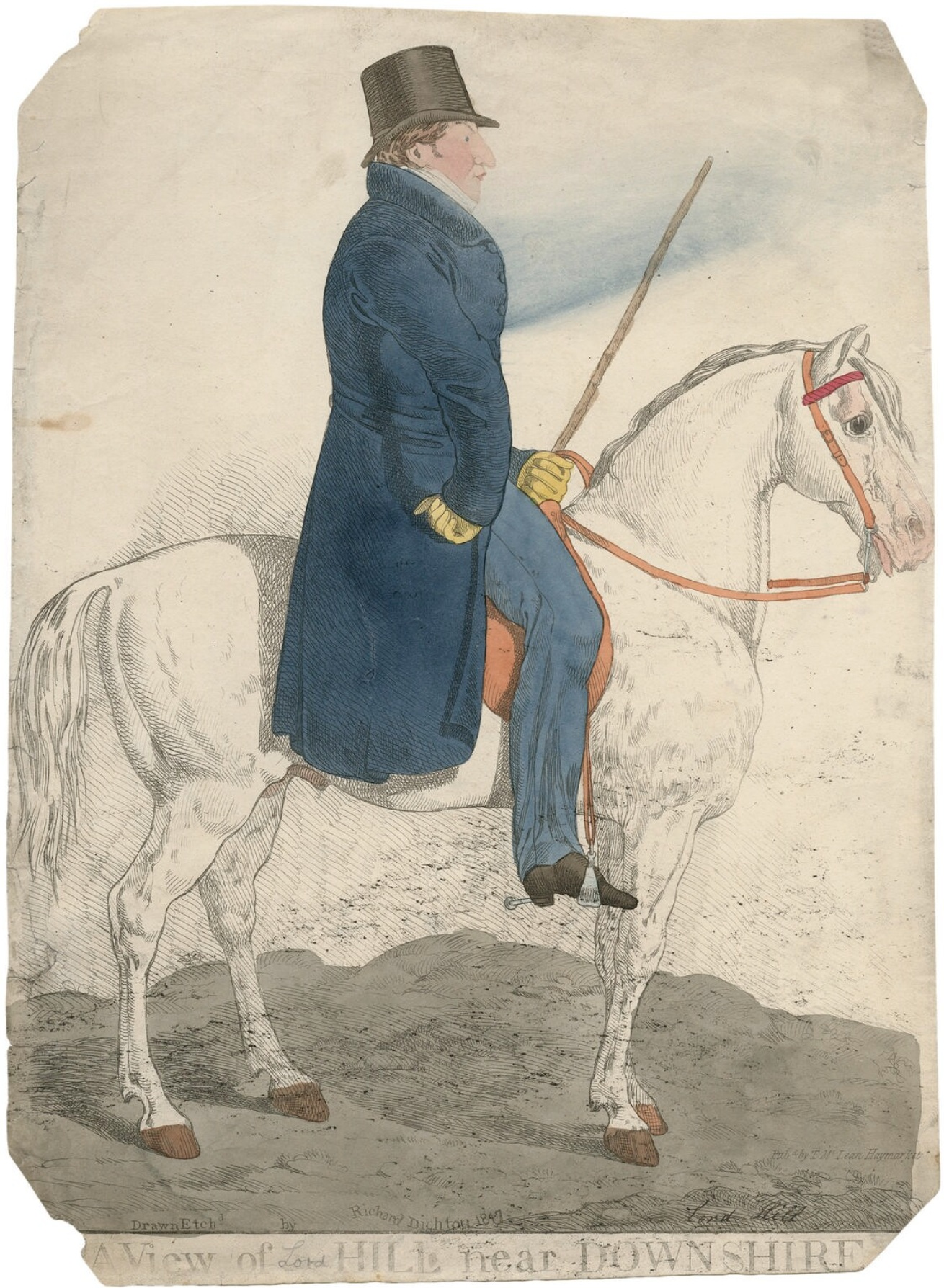
1817 portrait of Downshire by Richard Dighton

Arthur Blundell Sandys Trumbull Hill, 3rd Marquess of Downshire KP (8 October 1788 – 12 September 1845) was an Anglo-Irish peer, styled Viscount Fairford from 1789 until 1793 and Earl of Hillsborough from 1793 to 1801.

== Early life ==
He was born in Hanover Square, the eldest son of Arthur Hill, 2nd Marquess of Downshire, and his wife, Mary Sandys. He became Marquess of Downshire on the early death of his father in 1801. He was educated at Eton and Christ Church, Oxford, gaining his MA in 1809 and a DCL in 1810.

== Career ==
During his early political career, Downshire was identified with the Whigs and supported the reform of Parliament. After the Grey Ministry came to power, he received a succession of appointments, becoming Colonel of the South Down Militia on 25 March 1831 and carrying the second sword at the coronation of William IV on 8 September. He was appointed a deputy lieutenant of Berkshire on 20 September, Lord Lieutenant of Down on 17 October (a new office replacing the Governor of Down), and finally a Knight of the Order of St Patrick on 24 November 1831. He received an honorary LL.D from Cambridge on 6 July 1835.

Hill was a very strong supporter of the Irish language, and was president of the Ulster Gaelic Society (est. 1830). In this capacity he played an important role in helping preserve records of the language, poetry, folk and song collections and much else.

Hill was disliked by Elizabeth Smith, diarist at Baltyboys House, County Wicklow who felt snubbed by him when she and her husband first moved into the area. Writing of him after his death she recalled "The late Lord never called upon me when I first came here although the Colonel waited upon him. The Colonel never went near him again".

== Personal life ==
In 1811 he married Lady Mary Windsor, daughter of Other Windsor, 5th Earl of Plymouth. They had five children:

- Arthur Wills Blundell Sandys Trumbull Windsor Hill, 4th Marquess of Downshire (1812–1868), who married Hon. Caroline Cotton, eldest daughter of Stapleton Cotton, 1st Viscount Combermere.
- Lady Charlotte Augusta Hill (1815–1861), who married Sir George Chetwynd, 3rd Baronet, and had issue.
- Lord William Frederick Arthur Montagu Hill (1816–1844), a Captain with the Scots Greys who was killed in a hunting accident.
- Lady Mary Penelope Hill (1817–1884), who married Alexander Hood, 1st Viscount Bridport and had issue.
- Arthur Edwin Hill-Trevor, 1st Baron Trevor (1819–1894), who married, firstly, Mary Emily, daughter of Sir Richard Sutton, 2nd Baronet, in 1848. After her death in 1855 he married, secondly, the Hon. Mary Catherine, daughter of Reverend the Hon. Alfred Curzon (younger son of the 2nd Baron Scarsdale).

Lord Downshire died on 12 September 1845.

Honorary titles
New office	Lord Lieutenant of Down; 1831–1845	Succeeded by The Marquess of Londonderry
Peerage of Ireland
Preceded by Arthur Hill	Marquess of Downshire; 1801–1845	Succeeded by Arthur Hill
