= High Sheriff of Carrickfergus =

The Sheriff (later High Sheriff) of Carrickfergus was the high sheriff (British monarch's judicial representative) in the county of the town of Carrickfergus until the county was abolished under the Local Government (Ireland) Act 1898.

In medieval times, the Earldom of Ulster was split into multiple counties, each with a seneschal representing the earl and a sheriff representing the King of England in his role as Lord of Ireland. Adjoining counties were centred on the towns of Antrim and Carrickfergus and shared a sheriff; the earliest surviving record found by Samuel McSkimin in 1812 dated from 1325. About 1305, Elys de Berkeweye was treasurer and chancellor of Ulster and sheriff of Carrickfergus.

The town of Carrickfergus formerly had two bailiffs; in 1523 these were Thos. Unchile and Henry Fythe. Under the 1569 royal charter which established Carrickfergus as a county corporate, the town had two sheriffs, elected annually at the same municipal corporation meeting which elected the mayor; the new mayor's first official act was to swear in the new sheriffs. Until 1743, the mayor selected one sheriff and the full council the other, the latter taking precedence; thereafter, the council elected both sheriffs. The same sheriff often served multiple consecutive years.

The sheriff's annual salary from the corporation was £6 13s 4d in 1601, increased to £10 in 1732 and £20 in 1797. In 1624, other allowances were replaced with the right to collect certain fines. Other fees were supposed to be forwarded to the Court of Exchequer in Dublin, but by 1800 this duty had been neglected, and several sheriffs were arrested and imprisoned for failing to provide proper accounts. In 1820, the sheriff's corporation salary was increased to £40 to cover the expense of making accounts and delivering them to the Exchequer. At that time he also received £8 on presentment from the grand jury in lieu of fees from the prisoners in the town gaol; and his estimated income from fees for serving writs was £25 to £30. His only other expense was three guineas to the town criers for each of the two annual assizes.

The Municipal Corporations (Ireland) Act 1840 abolished the town's corporation (effective 1842) but not its county grand jury and assizes. Thereafter a single sheriff was appointed annually in the same manner as counties-at-large: the justice at the summer assizes made a shortlist of three, from which the King's Bench justices collectively chose one name for the Lord Lieutenant of Ireland to appoint by letters patent under the Great Seal of Ireland. Carrickfergus was the smallest county in Ireland in area and population, and the number of landed gentry with sufficient property to be eligible to serve as sheriff was in consequence small; on several occasions the person nominated committed the crime of refusal to serve in a public office.

County Antrim surrounds Carrickfergus and the corporate county of Carrickfergus was merged into the administrative county of Antrim in 1899, abolishing the office of high sheriff of Carrickfergus.

== List of sheriffs and high sheriffs ==
- 1568–1569 John Teade and Nicholas Wilis
- 1569–1570 Nicholas Rogers and John Flude
- 1570–1571 Wolston Elderton and Cornell O'Kane
- 1571–1572 William Dobbin and Patrick Savadge, jnr
- 1572–1573 Wolston Elderton and John Dyer
- 1573–1574 Gregory Grafton and William Field, snr
- 1574–1575 Humphrey Potts and John Cockrill
- 1575–1576 John Cockrill and John Dishford
- 1576–1577 John Dyer and John Dishford
- 1577–1578 Robert Magye and Robert Warcope
- 1578–1579 Humphrey Johnston and Mychaell Savadge
- 1579–1580 Barnabic Ward and Thomas Stephenson
- 1580–1581 Humphrey Johnston and John Dyer
- 1581–1582 John Savadge and Phellimy Magye
- 1582–1583 John Dishford and James Dobbin
- 1583–1584 John Dyer and Rychard Thomas
- 1584–1585 Mathew Jones and John Scully
- 1585–1586 John Dishford and Mychael Savadge
- 1586–1587 Humphrey Johnston and John Scully
- 1587–1588 John Dyer and James Dobbin
- 1588–1589 Thomas Vaughan and John Lugg
- 1589–1590 James Dobbin and Roger Cooper
- 1590–1591 William Savadge and Henrie Ockforde (John Dyer deputy)
- 1591–1592 Moyses Hill and Roger Cooper
- 1592–1593 Alexander Haynes and James Dobbin
- 1593–1594 John Hooper and James Rice
- 1594–1595 Robert Wills died, succeeded by John Dyer; and Richard Thomas
- 1595–1596 Roger Cooper and Rychard Conlon
- 1596–1597 Thomas Vaughan and Thomas Wytter
- 1597–1598 Rychard Thomas died, succeeded by Henry Ockford; and Thomas Gravott
- 1598–1599 Rychard Newton and Owen Magye
- 1599–1600 Henrie Spearpointe and Sydney Russel
- 1600–1601 Rychard Newton and Rychard Faythe
- 1601–1602 Rychard Newton and Rychard Faythe
- 1602–1603 Mychaell Whyte; and Ralph Storie died, succeeded by Thomas Gravott
- 1603–1604 Dudley Yearworth and Robert Lyndon
- 1604–1605 Thomas Wytter and Clement Foard
- 1605–1606 Thomas M'Manus and Thomas Cooper
- 1606–1607 Owen Magye and Leonard Gale
- 1607–1608 Nicholas Dobbin and Dermot Haynes
- 1608–1609 Robert Elice and Walter Hilman
- 1609–1610 Jasper Happer and Thomas Powell
- 1610–1611 Bartholomewe Johnston and Rychard Wytter
- 1611–1612 William Hurley and Edward Hodgsone
- 1612–1613 Thomas Bashford and Ezechiel Davis
- 1613–1614 William Dobbin dismissed, succeeded by Carew Hart; and William Stephenson
- 1614–1615 Clement Foard and Anthony Dobbin
- 1615–1616 Thomas M'Manus and Thomas Papes
- 1616–1617 William Hurley and Thomas Kirkpatrick
- 1617–1618 Matthewe Johnston and John Redworth
- 1618–1619 Nicholas Dobbin and Cornell O'Kane
- 1619–1620 Edward Wilkinson and Edward Hodgsone
- 1620–1621 Inghram Horsman and Cornell O'Kane
- 1621–1622 James Savadge died, and William Story
- 1622–1623 Robert Savadge and John Davis
- 1623–1624 Rychard Spearpoynte and William Cloughe
- 1624–1625 Marmaduke Newton (I) and Edwarde Mason
- 1625–1626 Edwarde Hodgsone and Andrewe Dixon
- 1626–1627 Cornelius Hermans and John Howsell
- 1627–1628 Thomas Richison and Ralph Kilman
- 1628–1629 Thomas Turner and John Edgar
- 1629–1630 William Penrie and William Cankarth
- 1630–1631 Thomas Whitager and Anthony Haull
- 1631–1632 Joshua Wharton and Clement Bashford
- 1632–1633 Rychard Spearpoynte and Marmaduke Newton (I)
- 1633–1634 John Davies and John Parkes
- 1634–1635 William Happer and William Ayshworth
- 1635–1636 Thomas Gravott and William Bashforde
- 1636–1637 Thomas Richison and William Williams
- 1637–1638 Edward Johnston and John Hall
- 1638–1639 William Happer and William Penrie, jnr
- 1639–1640 Thomas Gravott and Humphrey Johnston
- 1640–1641 Robert Savadge and George Happer
- 1641–1642 T. Baker and Mychaell Savadge
- 1642–1643 John Bullworthy and William Bashforde
- 1643–1644 Patrick Fitz-James Savadge and William Bashforde
- 1644–1645 Patrick Fitz-James Savadge and James F. N. Dobbin
- 1645–1646 John Savadge and William Bashforde
- 1646–1647 Thomas Tennison and John Orpin
- 1647–1648 John Boyd and James Dobbin
- 1648–1649 John Boyd and James Dobbin
- 1649–1650 William Cathcart and John Orpin
- 1650–1651 James Crooks and Robert Welsh
- 1651–1652 Rowland M'Quillan and Edmond Davies
- 1652–1653 Thomas Dobbin and John Bullworthy, jnr
- 1653–1654 Anthony Hall and Rowland M'Quillan
- 1654–1655 John Hall and John Birte
- 1655–1656 Peter Taylour and Thomas Dobbin
- 1656–1657 Robert Wytter and William Dobbin
- 1657–1658 Thomas Griffeth and Andrew Gardner
- 1658–1659 Jasper Haper and John Wadman
- 1659–1660 Samuel Trecherne and William Thomson
- 1660–1661 Michaell Kerr and Richard Johnston
- 1661–1662 Thomas Dobbin and Rowland M'Quillan
- 1662–1663 William Thomson and Rowland M'Quillan
- 1663–1664 Thomas Dobbin and Rowland M'Quillan
- 1664–1665 Rowland M'Quillan and Thomas Dobbin
- 1665–1666 Richard Johnston and John Magee
- 1666–1667 Cornelius Bashforde and Richard Westbrook
- 1667–1668 Henry Burnes and Ezekiel Davies
- 1668–1669 Richard Pendleton and William Hilditch
- 1669–1670 Samuel Trehecue and John Stubbs
- 1670–1671 John Henderson and Symon Richardson
- 1671–1672 Symon Richardson and William Bennett
- 1672–1673 Thomas M'Manus and John Smyth
- 1673–1674 James M'Cullogh and John Davies
- 1674–1675 George Walsh and Edward Hall
- 1675–1676 Thomas Harper and Adam Dennison
- 1676–1677 John Smyth and John Tyso
- 1677–1678 James M'Cullogh and William Dawson
- 1678–1679 Robert Williams and Cornelius Bashford
- 1679–1680 Richard Pendleton and John Magee
- 1680–1681 Andrew Clements and John Byrtt
- 1681–1682 John Dobbin and Henry Burnes
- 1682–1683 John Davies and William Johnston
- 1683–1684 John Kerr and Edward Hall
- 1684–1685 Symon Richison and John Henderson
- 1685–1686 James M'Cullogh and John Kerr
- 1686–1687 John M'Cullogh and Richard Kane
- 1687–1688 Richard Horsman and Marmaduke Newton (II)
- 1688–1689 Richard Horsman and Marmaduke Newton (II)
- 1689–1690 Richard Horsman and Marmaduke Newton (II)
- 1690–1691 Samuel Davys and William Tisdall
- 1691–1692 Soloman Bashford and John Brown
- 1692–1693 David Hood and John M'Cully
- 1693–1694 William Dawson and James Erwin
- 1694–1695 William Tisdall and Cornelius Crymble
- 1695–1696 Robert Williams and Cornelius Bashford
- 1696–1697 Roger Horseman and Soloman Bashford
- 1697–1698 David Hood and James Erwin
- 1698–1699 Captain Arthur Davys and Captain John Davys
- 1699–1700 John Chaplin and Captain James Gibbons
- 1700–1701 Soloman Bashford and James Erwin
- 1701–1702 John Bashford and Nathaniel Byrtte
- 1702–1703 David Hood and Thomas Bashford
- 1703–1704 David Hood and Thomas Bashford
- 1704–1705 John Chaplin and Thomas Bashford
- 1705–1706 John Chaplin and Thomas Bashford
- 1706–1707 Thomas Young and Nicholas Brown
- 1707–1708 Thomas Young and Nicholas Brown
- 1708–1709 John Bashford and Thomas Bashford
- 1709–1710 John Bashford and Thomas Bashford
- 1710–1711 Thomas Young and William Bashford
- 1711–1712 Rigby Dobbin and Nicholas Brown
- 1712–1713 Charles Howard and James Wilson
- 1713–1714 Ezekiel Davys Wilson and John Brown, jnr
- 1714–1715 Thomas Young and Thomas Bashford
- 1715–1716 Rigby Dobbin and Nicholas Brown
- 1716–1717 David Morrison and William Bashford
- 1717–1718 David Morrison and William Spencer
- 1718–1719 Rigby Dobbin and Andrew Newton
- 1719–1720 David Morrison and William Bashford
- 1720–1721 David Morrison and William Magee
- 1721–1722 William Bashford and James Erwin
- 1722–1723 David Morrison and Thomas Bashford
- 1723–1724 David Morrison and Thomas Bashford
- 1724–1725 David Morrison and Thomas Bashford
- 1725–1726 Willoughby Chaplin and Nathaniel Byrt
- 1726–1727 David Morrison and John Coleman
- 1727–1728 John Chaplin and George Spaight
- 1728–1729 Nathaniel Byrt and William Magee
- 1729–1730 Henry Gill and George Spaight
- 1730–1731 Willoughby Chaplin and Nathaniel Byrt
- 1731–1732 David Morrison and Clements Courtney
- 1732–1733 John Chaplin and Clements Courtney
- 1733–1734 John Chaplin and Nathaniel Byrt
- 1734–1735 Clements Courtney and John Coleman
- 1735–1736 Clements Courtney and John Coleman
- 1736–1737 Nathaniel Byrt and John Coleman
- 1737–1738 Nathaniel Byrt and John Coleman
- 1738–1739 Nathaniel Byrt and Hercules Clements
- 1739–1740 Richard Chaplin and John Seeds
- 1740–1741 John Davys and John Seeds
- 1741–1742 Nathaniel Byrt and Richard Chaplin
- 1742–1743 Davys Wilson and Richard Chaplin
- 1743–1744 Edward Jones and Davys Wilson
- 1744–1745 Edward Jones and Davys Wilson
- 1745–1746 Richard Chaplin and Nathaniel Byrt
- 1746–1747 William Macartney and Nathaniel Byrt
- 1747–1748 Richard Chaplin and Davys Wilson
- 1748–1749 Edward Jones and William Macartney
- 1749–1750 Richard Chaplin and John Seeds
- 1750–1751 Richard Chaplin and John Seeds
- 1751–1752 Richard Chaplin and John Seeds
- 1752–1753 Richard Chaplin and Ezekiel Wilson
- 1753–1754 John Seeds and Ezekiel Wilson
- 1754–1755 John Seeds and Ezekiel Wilson
- 1755–1756 John Seeds and Ezekiel Wilson
- 1756–1757 Henry Burleigh and John Seeds
- 1757–1758 Ezekiel Wilson and John Seeds
- 1758–1759 Ezekiel Wilson and John Seeds
- 1759–1760 Ezekiel Wilson and Thomas Ludford
- 1760–1761 Ezekiel Wilson and John Seeds
- 1761–1762 Ezekiel Wilson and John Seeds
- 1762–1763 Ezekiel Wilson and John Seeds
- 1763–1764 Ezekiel Wilson and John Seeds
- 1764–1765 Ezekiel Wilson and John Seeds
- 1765–1766 Ezekiel Wilson and John Seeds
- 1766–1767 Stewart Banks and John Seeds
- 1767–1768 Stewart Banks and John Seeds
- 1768–1769 Stewart Banks and John Seeds
- 1769–1770 John Seeds and William Craig
- 1770–1771 John Seeds and William Craig
- 1771–1772 John Seeds and William Craig
- 1772–1773 John Seeds and William Craig
- 1773–1774 John Seeds and William Craig
- 1774–1775 Thomas Kirk and John Seeds
- 1775–1776 Thomas Kirk and John Seeds
- 1776–1777 Thomas Kirk and John Seeds
- 1777–1778 Thomas Kirk and John Seeds
- 1778–1779 Thomas Kirk and John Seeds
- 1779–1780 Thomas Kirk and John Seeds
- 1780–1781 Thomas Kirk and Robert Clements
- 1781–1782 Thomas Kirk and Robert Clements
- 1782–1783 Thomas Kirk and Robert Clements
- 1783–1784 Thomas Kirk and Robert Clements
- 1784–1785 Thomas Kirk and Robert Clements
- 1785–1786 Thomas Kirk and Robert Clements
- 1786–1787 Robert Clements and Thomas Legg
- 1787–1788 Robert Clements and Thomas Legg
- 1788–1789 Robert Clements and Thomas Legg
- 1789–1790 Robert Clements and Thomas Legg
- 1790–1791 Robert Clements and Thomas Legg
- 1791–1792 Thomas Kirk and Thomas Legg
- 1792–1793 Robert Clements and Thomas Kirk
- 1793–1794 Robert Clements and Thomas Kirk
- 1794–1795 Robert Clements and Thomas Kirk
- 1795–1796 Robert Clements and Thomas Kirk
- 1796–1797 Thomas Kirk and William Craig
- 1797–1798 Thomas Kirk and Barry Martin
- 1798–1799 Thomas Kirk and Barry Martin
- 1799–1800 Thomas Kirk and Barry Martin
- 1800–1801 Thomas Kirk and Barry Martin
- 1801–1802 Thomas Kirk and Barry Martin
- 1802–1803 Thomas Kirk and Barry Martin
- 1803–1804 Thomas Kirk and Barry Martin
- 1804–1805 Thomas Kirk and Barry Martin
- 1805–1806 Thomas Kirk and Barry Martin
- 1806–1807 Thomas Kirk and Barry Martin
- 1807–1808 Thomas Kirk and Barry Martin
- 1808–1809 Thomas Kirk and Barry Martin
- 1809–1810 Thomas Kirk and Barry Martin
- 1810–1811 Thomas Kirk and Robert M'Gowan
- 1811–1812 Thomas Kirk and Robert M'Gowan
- 1812–1813 Thomas Kirk and Robert M'Gowan
- 1813–1814 Thomas Kirk and Robert M'Gowan
- 1814–1815 Thomas Millar and John Campbell
- 1815–1816 Thomas Millar and John Campbell
- 1816–1817 Thomas Millar and John Campbell
- 1817–1818 Charles V. Joyce and Andrew M'Nevin
- 1818–1819 Thomas Millar and George Burleigh
- 1819–1820 James A. Farrel and Hugh Kennedy
- 1820–1821 James Owens and David Gorden (George P. Price deputy)
- 1821–1822 Thomas Millar and Hon. J. Joycelyn
- 1822–1823 Peter Kirk and Henry Adair
- 1823–1824 Thomas Millar and Marriot Dalway
- 1824–1825 Peter Kirk and Marriot Dalway
- 1825–1826 John Campbell and Thomas Millar
- 1826–1827 John Campbell and Thomas Millar
- 1827–1828 John Campbell and Thomas Millar
- 1828–1829 Thomas Millar and John Campbell
- 1829–1830 John Campbell and John M'Cance
- 1830–1831 John Campbell and John M'Cance
- 1831–1832 John Campbell and Marriott Dalway
- 1832–1833 John Campbell and Marriott Dalway
- 1833–1834 George Forsythe and John Legg
- 1834–1835 George Forsythe and John Legg
- 1835–1836 George Forsythe and John Legg
- 1836–1837 George Forsythe and John Legg
- 1837–1838 George Forsythe and John Legg
- 1838–1839 George Forsythe and John Legg
- 1839–1840 George Forsythe and John Legg
- 1840–1841 George Forsythe and John Legg
- 1841 — John Legg
- 1842 — William Duncan
- 1843 — Edward Bruce
- 1844 — William Burleigh, J.P.
- 1845 — Stewart Dunn
- 1846 — V. W. Magill
- 1847 — William Moore
- 1848 — Charles M'Garell
- 1849 — Stephen Richard Rice
- 1850 — Peter Kirk
- 1851 — H. T. Higginson
- 1852 — William Kirk
- 1853 — James Barnett
- 1854 — William Kirk
- 1855 — James Barnett
- 1856 — Thomas Mercer Birnie
- 1857 — John Legg
- 1858 — W. J. C. Allen
- 1859 — Marriott Robert Dalway
- 1860 — Thomas Battersby
- 1861 — James Alexander
- 1862 — Andrew Forsythe
- 1863 — John Borthwick
- 1864 — William M'Gee, M.D.
- 1865 — Snowden Corken
- 1866 — Samuel Greame Fenton
- 1867 — W. D. Duncan Wilson
- 1858 — William Rowan Legg
- 1869 — James Mehan
- 1870 — Alexander Johns
- 1871 — Thomas Greer
- 1872 — Austin Cornwall
- 1873 — Alexander Taylor
- 1875 — Frances Elcocke Massey
- 1876 — George M'Auliffe, J.P.
- 1877 — Robert Alexander, J.P.
- 1878 — John Campbell
- 1879 — William John Nicholl, J.P.
- 1880 — Wm. Allan Woodside, J.P.
- 1881 — Charles A. W. Stewart
- 1882 — James Taylor Reid, J.P.
- 1883 — George Edmonstone Kirk
- 1884 — William Bell, J.P.
- 1885 — Pardo A. Kirk
- 1886 — John Shaw Exham, J.P.
- 1887 — Robert MacMurray, J.P.
- 1888 — Alfred J. A. Lepper, J.P.
- 1889 — James Napier Hamilton
- 1890 — John M'Ferran
- 1891 — William Porter, J.P.
- 1892 — Edward W. Keegan
- 1893 — Colonel James Craig, J.P.
- 1894 — John Barbour Pirrie
- 1895 — David Woodside
- 1896 — John Wilson
- 1897 — John Wilson, J.P. (carried over; Captain Conway Higginson was elected but refused to serve, for which he was fined £5)
- 1898 — Robert Kelly, J.P.
- 1899 — Charles James Johnstone

== Sources ==
- Municipal Corporations (Ireland) Act 1840
- Kirk, Peter (26 April 1826). "Appendix No. 179". In Commissioners appointed to inquire into the Duties, Salaries, and Emoluments of the Officers, Clerks, and Ministers of Justice in all Temporal and Ecclesiastical Courts in Ireland (ed.). Fifteenth Report: Office of Sheriff. Parliamentary papers. Vol. HC 1826 xvii (310) 29. pp. 577–579.
- McSkimin, Samuel; M'Crum, Elizabeth J. (1909). The history and antiquities of the county of the town of Carrickfergus (New ed.). Belfast: Mullan, J. Cleeland, Davidson & M'Cormack.
