= Ezekiel Davys Wilson =

Irish politician

Ezekiel Davys Wilson (1738 – January 1821) was an Irish politician.

Wilson was a Member of Parliament for Carrickfergus in the Irish House of Commons between 1785 and the passing of the Acts of Union 1800. He subsequently contested two elections to the Parliament of the United Kingdom in the Carrickfergus constituency as an independent; in 1802 he was defeated by Lord Spencer Chichester (381 to 270 votes) and in 1812 he lost to Arthur Chichester (460 to 405 votes). He was mayor of Carrickfergus and High Sheriff of Carrickfergus for multiple terms between 1769 and 1820.

Parliament of Ireland
Preceded by Waddell Cunningham; Conway Richard Dobbs	Member of Parliament for Carrickfergus with Conway Richard Dobbs (1785–1790); Alexander Hamilton (1790–1797); Lord Spencer Chichester (1797–1798); Earl of Belfast (1798–1799); Noah Dalway (1799–1800); 1785–1800	Succeeded by Parliament of the United Kingdom
