= John Lyndon =

Irish judge & politician (c.1630–1699)

Personal details
- Born: 1630 Carrickfergus, Ireland
- Died: 1699 (aged 68–69) Ireland
- Occupation: Judge, politician

Sir John Lyndon (c. 1630 – 1699) was an Irish judge and politician of the seventeenth century. He was the first holder of the office of Third Serjeant-at-law, which was created especially for him, apparently as a "consolation prize" for not being made a High Court judge the first time he sought that office. He was also Recorder of Carrickfergus for many years, a position held by several members of the Lyndon family over the best part of a century.

== Early career ==
He was born in Carrickfergus, son of Captain Roger Lyndon, Collector of Customs for the town of Carrickfergus, and his wife Jane Marten. The Lyndons were a prominent Carrickfergus family who settled in the town around the time of its foundation in the early 1590s. At least one branch of John's own descendants was associated with Dublin, but they continued to play a prominent role in the political life of Carrickfergus until at least the 1730s. One Henry Lyndon was Mayor of Carrickfergus in 1600. John had at least one brother, also named Roger, who in 1666 married Dorothy Newburgh, daughter of Thomas Newburgh MP of Ballyhaise, County Cavan. Roger, the father, was Recorder 1641-57, like his son and grandson after him.

John was educated at Trinity College, Dublin. He entered Lincoln's Inn in 1657, although it seems that he was not actually called to the Bar in England, something which later caused him a good deal of difficulty when he tried to set up a legal practice in England. He was appointed Recorder of Carrickfergus in 1657 and entered the King's Inn in 1663. He was seneschal of St. Patrick's Cathedral, Dublin. He sat in the Irish House of Commons as MP for Killybegs in the sole Irish Parliament of the reign of Charles II (1661-1666). In 1663 he defeated an effort by Sir Audley Mervyn to replace him as Recorder of Carrickfergus (this was not a Crown appointment: the Recorder was elected by the town corporation). The Recordership however was a badly paid job (the salary was £20 per annum, later reduced to £10) which explains his wish for a more lucrative position.

== The first Third Serjeant ==
The office of Third Serjeant was created especially for him in 1682: this was widely regarded as a "consolation prize" for his failure to secure a place on the Court of Common Pleas (Ireland). The situation became comical when the office of Second Serjeant was given to William Beckett: both Lyndon and Sir Richard Ryves, the Recorder of Dublin, claimed that it had been promised to them. Ormonde, the Lord Lieutenant of Ireland, took a keen interest in judicial appointments, but he did not regard the Serjeant-at-law as an office of much importance (probably due to his deep distrust of Sir Audley Mervyn, who had been the Prime Serjeant in the 1660s), and had always said that one Serjeant was quite enough. He frankly admitted that when he appointed Beckett as Serjeant he had forgotten that Lyndon had already received his patent of appointment to the same office. A compromise arrangement was reached by which Beckett remained as Second Serjeant; he died a few months later. Ryves was promised, and received, the next vacant Serjeantship, and Lyndon, in addition to becoming Third Serjeant, was promised the next vacant seat on the High Court bench. The desire to conciliate Lyndon suggests that he was highly regarded by Ormonde, who was noted for loyalty to his friends. No specific duties were assigned to him as Third Serjeant, and the office was generally agreed to be surplus to requirements, at a time when the need for even two serjeants was questioned, not least by Ormonde himself, who had remarked many years earlier that the Second Serjeant had nothing to do.

== Judge ==
Ormonde kept his promise about a judicial appointment, and In January 1683 Lyndon was raised to the Bench as justice of the Court of King's Bench (Ireland). He was sent regularly to Ulster as justice of assize. In 1686-7 he was engaged in a dispute with his colleague Thomas Nugent as to which of them had precedence in Court: they are said to have quarrelled "as briskly as two women". He seems to have been in some financial difficulty at this time, as he petitioned the Crown for a licence to export wool, as a means of providing for his family. Despite their differences Nugent and Lyndon, who had jointly presided at the trial for murder of William (or Henry) Aston, eldest son of their late colleague Sir William Aston, who was found guilty and hanged, worked together to secure the return of his property, which was forfeit to the Crown, to his widow and children, who were living in poverty.

== The Glorious Revolution and afterwards ==
Although Lyndon was a sincere Protestant, (being a friend of Ormonde, he was most likely a staunch Anglican), the Catholic King James II, despite his policy of replacing Irish Protestant office-holders with Catholics in so far as possible, left Lyndon in peace until after the Glorious Revolution of 1688. James's arrival in Ireland in 1689 put Lyndon and the other remaining Protestants on the Irish Bench in a very difficult position, as they were naturally suspected of sympathising with the new King William III. Lyndon and his wife tried to escape to England, taking their valuables with them, but they were arrested at the waterside and their goods were seized. His enemies claimed that Lyndon then agreed to preside at the trials of suspected enemies of the Jacobite regime, as a bribe for the return of his property, and he did resume his position as justice of assize in Ulster for a time. Later in 1689 he and his family were permitted to go to England, but without their valuables. His position on the Bench was left vacant, apparently because no barrister would pay the fee for the patent of office. His efforts to practice at the Bar in England encountered a difficulty when it transpired that although he had been a law student at Lincoln's Inn, he had never been called to the English bar. Whether he overcame this disability is unclear.

Following the downfall of King James's cause at the Battle of the Boyne, Lyndon returned to Ireland, and was reappointed to the Bench in 1690 and knighted. He continued to go regularly on assize to Ulster. He remained Recorder of Carrickfergus until 1697, when he resigned; the town corporation chose his son Edward in his place. He died in 1699.

== Family ==
By his wife Elizabeth he had a numerous family, including at least five sons, John, Edward, Charles, Richard and George, and one daughter, who married her cousin Cuthbert Winder. Lady Lyndon died in June 1711, a fact mentioned by Jonathan Swift in a letter to his beloved friend Esther Johnson (Stella): "your Lady Lyndon is dead". Their eldest son, Captain John Lyndon, was killed at the Siege of Limerick (1691).

Edward, the second son, served as Recorder of Carrickfergus, like his father and grandfather before him, from 1697 until 1727. He also sat for Carrickfergus in the Irish House of Commons until 1727. The seat was next held by a younger John Lyndon, who was probably Edward's son.
