= Recorder of Carrickfergus =

The recorder of Carrickfergus was a judicial office-holder in pre-independence Ireland. The office dates from 1593, shortly after the incorporation of Carrickfergus. It was abolished by the new Government of Northern Ireland after the Partition of Ireland in 1921.

The office-holder had the usual duties of a recorder: to keep the peace in the town, to act as its Chief Magistrate, and to preside at criminal trials and at Quarter Sessions, where he had the duty of explaining the law to the jury and pronouncing the Court's judgement. In addition in the early centuries he had the duty of inspecting all leases of houses or lands within the town, for a small fee, but this duty had lapsed by 1800, as had his duty to admit new freemen of the town, again on payment of a small fee. Unlike some recorders, notably the recorder of Dublin, he invariably had a Deputy. The recorder was always a qualified lawyer, but the Deputy was not.

Like most recorderships it was not a Crown appointment: the recorder was elected by a free vote of the town corporation. Many recorders were therefore from local Carrickfergus families, including three generations of the Lyndon family who held the office continuously between 1641 and 1727. Outsiders to the town who were elected recorder, like Sir Thomas Hibbotts (MP for Carrickfergus in the Irish Parliament of 1613–15, and later Chancellor of the Exchequer) usually had a strong local connection, such as representing Carrickfergus in the Irish House of Commons.

The office was badly paid: originally fixed at £20 a year in 1593, the salary was later reduced to £10, and despite frequent requests, the corporation did not agree to increase it until 1820. Even then no precise sum was fixed: the corporation merely agreed to pay the expenses of Mr. Dobbs, the recorder, for attending the Quarter Sessions, until such time as they were able to agree a fixed sum. As noted there were originally some small perquisites, but these had lapsed long before 1820. For this reason several recorders, including Sir John Lyndon, Sir William Sambach and Barry Yelverton, 1st Viscount Avonmore lobbied hard for appointment to additional office as a Law Officer or judge.

After the partition of Ireland in 1921, the new Government of Northern Ireland decided that all recorderships except the recorder of Belfast and the recorder of Derry could be dispensed with.

== List of recorders of Carrickfergus (incomplete) ==
- 1593 William Lymsey
- 1596 Mr. Tookfield
- 1602 Sir Thomas Hibbotts, MP for Carrickfergus and later Chancellor of the Exchequer of Ireland
- 1630 Sir William Sambach, MP for Carrickfergus 1640- 42, and later Solicitor-General for Ireland
- 1641 Roger Lyndon
- 1657 Sir John Lyndon, son of Roger, later justice of the Court of King's Bench (Ireland)
- 1697 Edward Lyndon, son of Sir John; also MP for Carrickfergus 1703-1727
- 1727 George Macartney
- 1740 Edward Smith
- 1759 John Ludford
- 1765 George Hamilton
- 1778 Barry Yelverton, 1st Viscount Avonmore , MP for Carrickfergus 1776-1784
- 1806 Conway Dobbs

== Sources ==
- Ball, F. Elrington The Judges in Ireland 1221-1921 London John Murray 1926
- Hart, A.R History of the King's Serjeant at law in Ireland Dublin Four Courts Press 2000
- MacSkimin, Samuel History and Antiquities of the County of the town of Carrickfergus Published by the author Belfast 1829
- Smyth, Constantine Joseph Chronicle of the Law Officers of Ireland London Butterworths 1839
- County Courts Act (Northern Ireland) 1959
