= Noah Dalway =

Irish Royal Navy officer and member of parliament

Noah Dalway (c.1746 – 17 July 1820) was an Irish Royal Navy officer and politician.

Dalway was born Noah Webb, the son of Noah Webb of Dunshaughlin and Mehetabella Dalway. He served in the Royal Navy and is recorded as being a lieutenant in 1779. On 8 April 1795 he succeeded to his maternal uncle's estates and assumed the surname of Dalway by royal license.

In 1799, Dalway became the Member of Parliament for Carrickfergus in the Irish House of Commons through a by-election, likely under the patronage of George Chichester, 2nd Marquess of Donegall who preceded Dalway as MP. He opposed the Acts of Union 1800, but was co-opted to the First Parliament of the United Kingdom as the MP for Carrickfergus. In that parliament he was recorded by the Chief Secretary for Ireland, Charles Abbot, as an opponent of the government. Dalway was not recorded as having made any speeches and he was not re-elected at the 1802 United Kingdom general election. He was disqualified from active duty in the navy owing to age in 1814, having attained the rank of commander.

On 22 May 1795, he married Eleanor Benning, the daughter of Conway Benning. Dalway died on 17 July 1820 and the age of 76.

Parliament of the United Kingdom
Preceded by Parliament of Ireland	Member of Parliament for Carrickfergus; 1801–1802	Succeeded by Lord Spencer Chichester
Parliament of Ireland
Preceded by Ezekiel Davys Wilson; Earl of Belfast	Member of Parliament for Carrickfergus with Ezekiel Davys Wilson; 1799–1800	Succeeded by Parliament of the United Kingdom
