= Lord George Hill =

British Army officer and MP (1801–1879)

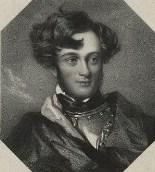
- Lord George Hill

Member of Parliament for Carrickfergus
- In office 1830–1832
- Preceded by: Sir Arthur Chichester, Bt
- Succeeded by: Conway Richard Dobbs

Personal details
- Born: 9 December 1801
- Died: 6 April 1879 (aged 77)
- Spouse(s): Cassandra Jane Knight (m. 1834) Louisa Knight (m. 1847)
- Children: 5
- Parents: The 2nd Marquess of Downshire (father); Mary, Marchioness of Downshire and 1st Baroness Sandys (mother)

Military service
- Allegiance: United Kingdom of Great Britain and Ireland
- Branch/service: British Army
- Years of service: 1817–1830
- Rank: Major

Lord George Augusta Hill (9 December 1801 – 6 April 1879) was an Anglo-Irish military officer, politician and landowner.

Hill was the posthumous son of the 2nd Marquess of Downshire and his wife Mary, Marchioness of Downshire, granddaughter of the 1st Baron Sandys. Lord George was born three months after his father's death by suicide.

== Military and political career ==
He entered the British Army in May 1817, initially a cornet in the Royal Horse Guards, promoted to lieutenant in 1820. He transferred to the Royal Irish Dragoons as a captain in 1825. In April 1830 he became aide-de-camp to Sir John Byng, Commander-in-Chief of the forces in Ireland, at the rank of major, but on 6 July he took half-pay.

In the 1830 general election, Hill was elected MP for Carrickfergus, unseating Sir Arthur Chichester, Bt. Hill's brother, the 3rd Marquess of Downshire, was a minor landowner in Carrickfergus; Lord George had been proposed as a candidate there in the 1826 general election, but had withdrawn in Chichester's favour, stating that he had been unaware of the nomination.

Although he was considered a friend to the Duke of Wellington's Tory government when elected, he was absent from the vote of confidence on 15 November 1830 which caused the government to fall, and thereafter supported the 2nd Earl Grey's government and its Reform Bill, like his brothers. Due to ill health, he did not contest the 1832 general election, instead supporting his brother Lord Marcus Hill, who was elected for Newry.

Lord George served as Comptroller of the Household to the Lord Lieutenant of Ireland, 1833–34, and as High Sheriff of Donegal in 1845.

== Gweedore ==
In 1836, His mother died and left him enough money to purchase his own estate and land.

In 1838, Hill bought land in Gweedore (Irish: Gaoth Dobhair), a 'district' in the north-west of County Donegal in the west of Ulster, and, over the next few years, he expanded his holdings to 23,000 acres. Hill himself described the condition of the local population as "more deplorable than can well be conceived"; according to the schoolmaster Patrick McKye, they were in the "most needy, hungry and naked condition of any people". Among other improvements, he built a port, Bunbeg Harbour, to encourage fishing, improved the roads and other infrastructure, and constructed The Gweedore Hotel to attract wealthy tourists.

However, his attempts to reform local farming practices, in particular, his suppression of the rundale system of shared landholding, proved unpopular and controversial. While his reforms may have protected Gweedore from the worst effects of the Great Famine of the 1840s – the local population did not decrease, as it did elsewhere in Ireland – Hill's attitude to the famine was uncompromising and unsympathetic:

The Irish people have profited much by the Famine, the lesson was severe; but so were they rooted in old prejudices and old ways, that no teacher could have induced them to make the changes which this Visitation of Divine Providence has brought about, both in their habits of life and in their mode of agriculture.

Hill's book Facts from Gweedore (1845) provides an account of conditions in Gweedore and seeks to explain and justify Hill's agricultural reforms. It ran to five editions and played a large part in the bitter public debates about the effects of Irish landlordism. In June 1858, Hill gave evidence to a House of Commons select committee on Irish poverty; the committee was critical of Hill's actions.

He died at his residence, Ballyare House in Ramelton, in April 1879. He was buried at Conwal Parish Church in Letterkenny, alongside the first Austen to whom he was married.

== Family ==
Hill was twice married, to two sisters, daughters of Edward Austen Knight (brother of Jane Austen). Hill previously met Cassandra Knight when she was 20 and he was 25. He proposed and she had accepted, but his mother Marchioness of Downshire intervened and forbade the marriage, declaring of her son's poor choice as "No money: all charms!" so their engagement was cancelled. Eight years passed and Cassandra was about to marry another man whom she didn't love when his mother finally yielded and allowed her favorite son to marry Cassandra.

On 21 October 1834, he married Cassandra Jane Knight. They had four children:

- Norah Mary Elizabeth Hill (12 December 1835 – 24 April 1920)
- Captain Arthur Blundell George Sandys Hill (13 May 1837 – 16 June 1923)
- Augustus Charles Edward Hill (9 March 1839 – 9 December 1908)
- Cassandra Jane Louisa Hill (12 March 1842 – 16 August 1901)

On 11 May 1847, he married Louisa Knight, niece and god-daughter of Jane Austen. She had moved to Ulster after her sister Cassandra's death to look after her children; the marriage prompted a parliamentary investigation into the legality of a marriage between a widower and his deceased wife's sister. They had one son:

- George Marcus Wandsbeck Hill (9 April 1849 – 22 March 1911)

== Media ==
The Peer, the Priests and the Press: A Story of the Demise of Irish Landlordism by Roy Greenslade (Beyond the Pale Books, 2023)

An Tiarna George Hill agus Pobal Ghaoth Dobhair by Cathal Póirtéir (Cló Iar-Chonnacht, 2023)

May, Lou and Cass: Jane Austen's Nieces in Ireland by Sophia Hillan (Blackstaff Press, 2011)

Parliament of the United Kingdom
Preceded by Sir Arthur Chichester, Bt	Member of Parliament for Carrickfergus; 1830–1832	Succeeded by Conway Richard Dobbs
