= High sheriff =

Official in a variety of countries

A high sheriff is a ceremonial officer for each shrieval county of England and Wales and Northern Ireland, or the chief sheriff of a number of paid sheriffs in U.S. states who outranks and commands the others in their court-related functions. In Canada, the High Sheriff provides administrative services to the supreme and provincial courts.

The office existed in the Irish Free State, but was abolished in 1926.

In England and Wales, the term "high sheriff" for the sheriff of a county was used at least as early as 1531. This may have helped distinguish the high sheriffs from the undersheriffs, the deputies they appointed, and from sheriffs of cities and boroughs designated counties corporate. The sheriffs of the counties created by the Local Government Act 1972, incepting on 1 April 1974 were statutorily titled High Sheriffs.

The office is now an unpaid privilege with ceremonial duties, the sheriffs being appointed annually by the Crown through a warrant from the Privy Council except for Cornwall, where the high sheriff is appointed by the Duke of Cornwall (currently the Prince of Wales) and for Merseyside, Greater Manchester and Lancashire, where they are appointed by the monarch in the right of the Duchy of Lancaster. In England and Wales the office's civil (civil judgment) enforcement powers exist but are not exercised by convention.

The website of the High Sheriffs’ Association of England and Wales stated in 2021 that the role was a "non-political Royal appointment", for one year, and unpaid.

== England and Wales ==
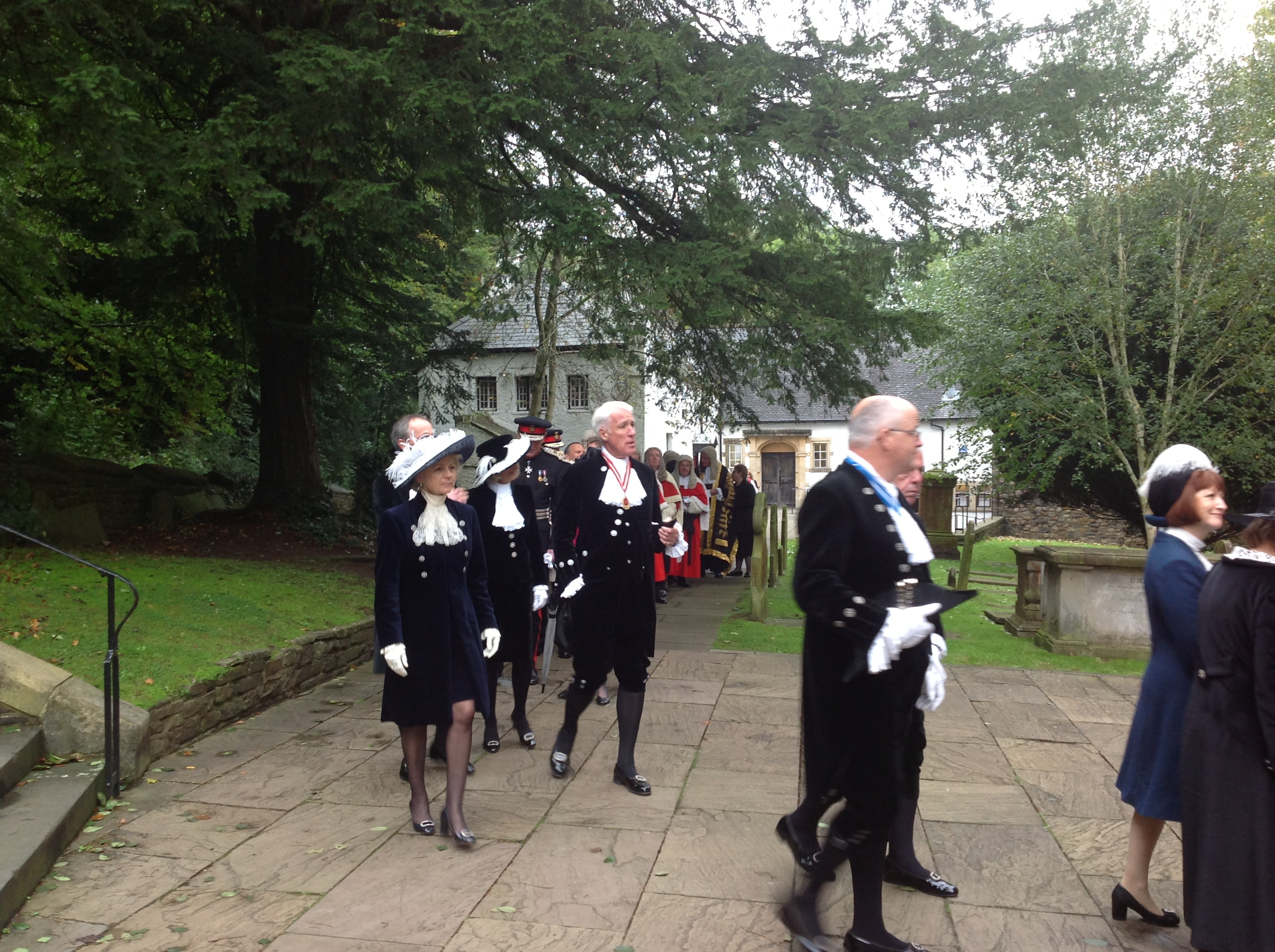
High sheriffs in the United Kingdom customarily wear velvet Court Dress suits on formal occasions.

In England, Wales the high sheriff (or in the City of London the sheriffs) are theoretically the sovereign's judicial representative in the county, while the lord-lieutenant is the sovereign's personal and military representative. Their jurisdictions, the shrieval counties, are the ceremonial counties. The post contrasts with that of sheriff in Scotland, who is a judge sitting in a sheriff court.

The word sheriff is a contraction of the term shire reeve. The term, from the Old English scīrgerefa, designated a royal official responsible for keeping the peace (a reeve) throughout a shire or county on behalf of the king. The term was preserved in England notwithstanding the Norman Conquest.

English historians have offered varying estimates as to when the office of the sheriff was established. According to historian George Molyneaux, "the late tenth century is a very plausible period for the introduction of sheriffs, especially in the south." The office reached the height of its power under the Norman kings. While the sheriffs originally had been men of great standing at court, the 13th century saw a process whereby the office devolved on significant men within each county, usually landowners. The Provisions of Oxford (1258) established a yearly tenure of office. The appointments and duties of the sheriffs in England and Wales were redefined by the Sheriffs Act 1887. Under the provisions of the Local Government Act 1972, on 1 April 1974, the office previously known as sheriff was retitled high sheriff.

The serving high sheriff submits a list of names of possible future high sheriffs to a tribunal which chooses three names to put to the sovereign. The nomination is made on 12 November every year and the term of office runs from 25 March, Lady Day, which was the first day of the year until 1751. No person may be appointed twice in three years unless there is no other suitable person in the county.

=== Nomination ===
The Sheriffs Act 1887 (as amended) provides that sheriffs should be nominated on 12 November (Martinmas), or the Monday following if it falls on a Sunday, by any two or more of the Chancellor of the Exchequer, the Lord President of the Council, and the Lord Chief Justice of England; other members of the Privy Council; and any two or more judges of the High Court. These amendments were in 1998, the Chancellor of the Exchequer was granted full entitlement, not merely conditional entitlement, if there is no Lord High Treasurer – since the treasurership is by constitutional convention always placed into commission, and in 2006 the Lord Chancellor was removed as a nominating officer through the operation of the Constitutional Reform Act 2005.

These officers nominate three candidates for each county in England and Wales (with the exception of Cornwall, Merseyside, Greater Manchester and Lancashire), which are enrolled on a parchment by the King's Remembrancer.

Eligibility for nomination and appointment as high sheriff under the Sheriffs Act 1887 excludes peers of Parliament, members of the House of Commons, commissioners or officers of His Majesty's Revenue and Customs, officers of the Post Office and officers of the Navy, Army or Royal Air Force on full pay, clergymen (whether beneficed or not) and barristers or solicitors in actual practice.

=== Pricking ===
The practice of pricking is an ancient custom used to appoint the high sheriffs of England and Wales.

In February or March of each year, two parchments prepared the previous November are presented to the sovereign at a meeting of the Privy Council. A further parchment is drawn up in November for Cornwall and presented to the Duke of Cornwall (or to the sovereign when there is no such duke).

Certain eligible persons (High Court judges and the Privy Council) nominate candidates for each county shrievalty, one of whom is chosen for each by the sovereign. In practice, the first name on the list is nowadays always the one chosen; the second and third names tend to become sheriffs in succeeding years, barring incapacity or death. The sovereign signifies assent by pricking (i.e., piercing) the document with a silver bodkin by the relevant name for each county, and signs the parchment when complete. The parchment for the Duchy of Lancaster is known as the Lites, and the ceremony of selection known as Pricking the Lites. The term lites, meaning list, was once reserved for Yorkshire; the date at which the name was transferred to Lancashire is unknown. The Lites is used for the three shrieval counties that fall wholly or partially within the boundaries of the historic county palatine of Lancaster, since 1 April 1974: Lancashire, Greater Manchester, and Merseyside.

The practice is believed to date back to a year in the reign of Elizabeth I, when, lacking a pen, she decided to use her bodkin to mark the name instead. By contrast, Lord Campbell stated, perhaps without the intention of publication, in February 1847, "[it began] in ancient times, sir, when sovereigns did not know how to write their names." while acquiring a prick and a signature from Queen Victoria as Prince Albert asked him when the custom began. The High Sheriffs' Association argues pricking vellum ensured that the record could not be altered. Given that holders of the office often had to bear large costs and implement unpopular policies altering the choice of the monarch must sometimes have been tempting.

=== Declaration ===
The declaration a person must make before taking the office of high sheriff is contained in the second schedule of the Sheriffs Act 1887. Additional words are inserted in the case of the Duchy of Cornwall; for example, the declaration includes: "do solemnly declare that I will well and truly serve the King’s Majesty and also his Royal Highness the Duke of Cornwall".

=== Responsibilities ===
Contemporary high sheriffs have few genuine responsibilities and their functions are largely representational, which include attendance at royal visits and a High Court judge opening ceremony, proclamation of a new sovereign, and acting as a returning officer in county constituencies during elections.

Theoretical responsibilities include the well-being and protection of High Court judges, and attending them in court; and the maintenance of the loyalty of subjects to the Crown. However, most of the high sheriff's work is delegated (for example, the local police now protect judges and courts) so that in effect the post of high sheriff is essentially ceremonial.

The high sheriff was traditionally responsible for the maintenance of law and order within the county, although most of these duties are now delegated to the police. As a result of its close links with law and order the position is frequently awarded to people with an association with law enforcement (former police officers, lawyers, magistrates, judges). The high sheriff was originally allowed to kill suspects resisting arrest; this was still legal in the 17th century. Edward Coke noted that when the high sheriff employed constables to assist in his duties the law was also extended to them.

=== Powers ===
Under the provisions of the Sheriffs Act 1887, if a sheriff finds any resistance in the execution of a writ he shall "take with him the power of the county" (known as posse comitatus), and shall go in proper person to do execution, and may arrest the resisters and commit them to prison, and every such resister shall be guilty of a misdemeanor.

They are entitled to grant High Sheriff Awards for community service, and judges have delegated authority to grant them on a sheriff's behalf, with a financial reward, to those who help to bring someone to justice, or who provide assistance to the victims of crime.

=== Exceptional counties ===
==== London and Middlesex ====
There are two sheriffs of the City of London, elected annually by the City of London liverymen; their function is similar, but not equivalent to that of high sheriff, since the Sheriffs Act 1887 says "Nothing in this Act shall affect the privilege of the mayor, commonalty, and citizens of the city of London to elect the sheriffs of London". The city sheriffs also served as sheriffs for Middlesex until 1889 when the office of High Sheriff of Middlesex was created under the Local Government Act 1888. The 1888 act also created a new County of London and Sheriff of the County of London. In 1965 the London Government Act 1963 replaced the counties of London and Middlesex with Greater London, having a single High Sheriff of Greater London, still separate from the city sheriffs.

==== Cornwall ====
The Duchy of Cornwall's first charter in 1337 states that the Shrievalty of Cornwall, the right to appoint the sheriff for the county, is vested in the Duke of Cornwall. Two further charters, dated 18 March 1337 and 3 January 1338, state that no sheriff of the king shall enter Cornwall to execute the king's writ. The High Sheriff of Cornwall swears to serve both the reigning monarch and Duke of Cornwall (i.e., the crown prince). When there is no Duke of Cornwall, the Duchy Council still sits, but under the trusteeship of the English (since 1707, British) monarch. Only as Duchy Trustee can the monarch appoint the Sheriff of Cornwall. Nomination and appointment generally takes place during Hilary, and announced via the Duchy of Cornwall Office.

==== Durham ====
The High Sheriff of Durham was appointed by the Prince-Bishop of Durham until 1836, when the jurisdiction of the county palatine became vested in the Crown. Since then the high sheriffs of Durham have been appointed in the same way as other high sheriffs in England and Wales.

==== Isle of Ely ====
After the Jurisdiction in Liberties Act 1535 (27 Hen. 8. c. 24) ended the palatine status of the Isle of Ely, the bishop remained custos rotulorum and appointed a chief bailiff for life to perform the functions of high sheriff within the liberty.

==== Lancashire ====
The right to nominate and select high sheriffs in Lancashire is vested in the monarch in right of the Duchy of Lancaster. Before 1974, this right applied only to the High Sheriff of Lancashire, but since the administrative changes of the Local Government Act 1972 (effective 1974), the High Sheriff of Greater Manchester and High Sheriff of Merseyside also come under the jurisdiction of the Duchy of Lancaster. As with other counties in England, three names are nominated to the Chancellor of the Duchy of Lancaster for Lancashire appointments; the chancellor presents these to the monarch with his recommendation in a private audience. New appointments are usually announced during Hilary.

==== Wales ====
The nomination of sheriffs in the counties of Wales was first vested by statute in the Council of Wales and the Marches and the Welsh justices under Henry VIII. With the abolition of the council in 1689, the power of nomination was transferred to the justices of the Court of Great Sessions in Wales. When this court was abolished in 1830, its rights were in turn transferred to the courts of King's Bench, Exchequer, and Commons Pleas. Finally, by the Sheriffs (Wales) Act 1845 (8 & 9 Vict. c. 11), the nomination and appointment of sheriffs in Wales was made identical to that in England.

== Canada ==
In Newfoundland and Labrador, the High Sheriff of Newfoundland and Labrador is primarily responsible for providing administrative and enforcement services to the Supreme Court of Newfoundland and the Provincial Courts. The Office of the High Sheriff administers the jury system, provides court security and executes orders and decisions of the court. These Officers act in the name of the Sheriff in accordance with directions given them and the law. They include bailiffs, Deputy Sheriffs, fee-for-service Deputy Sheriffs, and all other employees and staff of the High Sheriff. Sheriff's Officers have both the power and the duty to carry out orders of the Court. They are peace officers under the Criminal Code of Canada and have all the powers and protection of law enforcement officers.

== Island of Ireland ==
The evolution of Irish institutions under English (later British) rule largely mirrored those of England, including regarding sheriffs for the counties of Ireland. In 1495 Poynings' Law imported all English laws to the Lordship of Ireland, and the Parliament of Ireland's later changes both mirrored those at Westminster and made further changes to address specific Irish abuses.

Each year the senior judge at a county's summer assizes made a shortlist of three landed gentry who had not been sheriff in the previous three years; back in the Four Courts in Dublin the 12 assize judges and Lord Chancellor of Ireland would choose one of the three for each county; the formal appointment was by letters patent by the Viceroy (Lord Lieutenant of Ireland) under the Great Seal of Ireland. Refusing to serve was a misdemeanour subject to a heavy fine; in the 1890s two nominees for High Sheriff of Carrickfergus were prosecuted.

Originally, each of the eight counties corporate had two sheriffs, elected annually by its corporation. Similarly, although the 1613 charter of Londonderry city did not make it a county corporate, its corporation elected two sheriffs for the "City and County of Londonderry". The Municipal Corporations (Ireland) Act 1840 reduced each of these nine cases to a single sheriff nominated by the Viceroy. The Municipal Privileges (Ireland) Act 1876 restored Dublin Corporation's right to nominate the (single) High Sheriff of Dublin City, and allowed five other corporations to shortlist three candidates from among whom the Viceroy would nominate one, who was free to refuse. The shortlisting privilege was extended to the high sheriffs of Belfast and of Londonderry City, when those new county boroughs were created by the Local Government (Ireland) Act 1898.

The consolidation and repeal effected in England and Wales by the Sheriffs Act 1887 was not replicated in Ireland. The Sheriffs (Ireland) Act 1920 transferred most functions from the high sheriff to the under-sheriff, who in future was to be appointed permanently by the Viceroy rather than annually by the high sheriff. The 1920 act restricted the high sheriff to two ceremonial duties: summoning of the county grand jury and attending the judge at assizes.

=== Northern Ireland ===
The office continues to exist in Northern Ireland as a ceremonial one, on a similar basis to England and Wales. High sheriffs were appointed by the Lord Lieutenant of Ireland in 1922, the Governor of Northern Ireland from 1923 to 1972, and the Secretary of State for Northern Ireland since 1973. While the Local Government Act (Northern Ireland) 1972 abolished the counties of Northern Ireland as local government units, they remain as lieutenancy areas and coterminous shrievalties.

=== Republic of Ireland ===
No new appointments to the office of high sheriff were made after the Constitution of the Irish Free State came into force in 1922. The existing high sheriffs continued in office but had no functions, as the grand jury and assizes were first disused and then formally abolished by the Courts of Justice Act 1924. The office of high sheriff was formally abolished by the Court Officers Act 1926. The 1926 act envisaged gradually merging the office of under-sheriff into that of county registrar, but instead it was retained and renamed sheriff by the Court Officers Act 1945.

== United States ==
The position of high sheriff in the United States generally denotes the superior sheriff in a state, or the head of a statewide sheriff's department. Such a position exists in Rhode Island (executive high sheriff), and Hawaii. In New Hampshire, the ten high sheriffs are the senior law enforcement officers of each county, and have police powers throughout the state.

The Cherokee Nation formerly appointed a high sheriff, who was also the warden and treasurer of the Cherokee National Jail in Oklahoma. The position was created in 1876, after the abolition of the Light Horse. The first Cherokee high sheriff was Sam Sixkiller, appointed in 1876.

== See also ==
- Chief constable, currently the head of law enforcement in most of England and Wales
- List of shrievalties
- List of High Sheriffs of England, Wales and Northern Ireland 2007
- List of High Sheriffs of England, Wales and Northern Ireland 2008
- List of High Sheriffs of England, Wales and Northern Ireland 2009
- List of High Sheriffs of England, Wales and Northern Ireland 2010
- High Court enforcement officers
- Sheriff court (Scotland)
- Sheriff (brief details around the world)
- Bailiff (one of seven more junior, related offices in England and Wales to be re-branded as enforcement officer for all but water bailiff and jury bailiff in 2014)
- Refusal to serve in a public office, an obsolete criminal offence related to the appointment of high sheriffs

== Sources ==
- Atkinson, George (1839). A Practical Treatise on Sheriff-Law. William Crofts. OCLC 13722386.
- Atkinson, George (1854). Sheriff-Law. Longman, Brown, Green, and Longmans. OCLC 34650185.
- Churchill, Cameron; Bruce, A. Carmichael (1879). The law of the office and duties of the sheriff. Stevens & Sons. OCLC 15085483.
- Commissioners appointed to inquire into the Duties, Salaries, and Emoluments of the Officers, Clerks, and Ministers of Justice in all Temporal and Ecclesiastical Courts in Ireland (26 April 1826). Fifteenth Report: Office of Sheriff. Parliamentary papers. Vol. HC 1826 xvii (310) 29.
- "Palatinate High Sheriffs". London: The Duchy of Lancaster.
- Lancaster Priory (30 June 2000). "History of the Duchy of Lancaster and the Office of High Sheriff". Duchy of Lancaster. Archived from the original on 26 April 2008.
- Holdsworth, William (1942). A History of English Law. Vol. III (5th ed.). Methuen.
- Morris, W. A. (April 1918). "The Office of Sheriff in the Early Norman Period". English Historical Review. 33 (130): 145–175. doi:10.1093/ehr/XXXIII.CXXX.145. JSTOR 551561.
- "Duchy of Lancaster: Records of Appointment of the High Sheriff of the County Palatine of Lancaster". The National Archives.
- "Former Birkenhead pupil is our new High Sheriff". Wirral Globe. 25 April 2008.
