= Wellington Stapleton-Cotton, 2nd Viscount Combermere =

British soldier and Conservative politician

Colonel The Right Honourable The Viscount Combermere
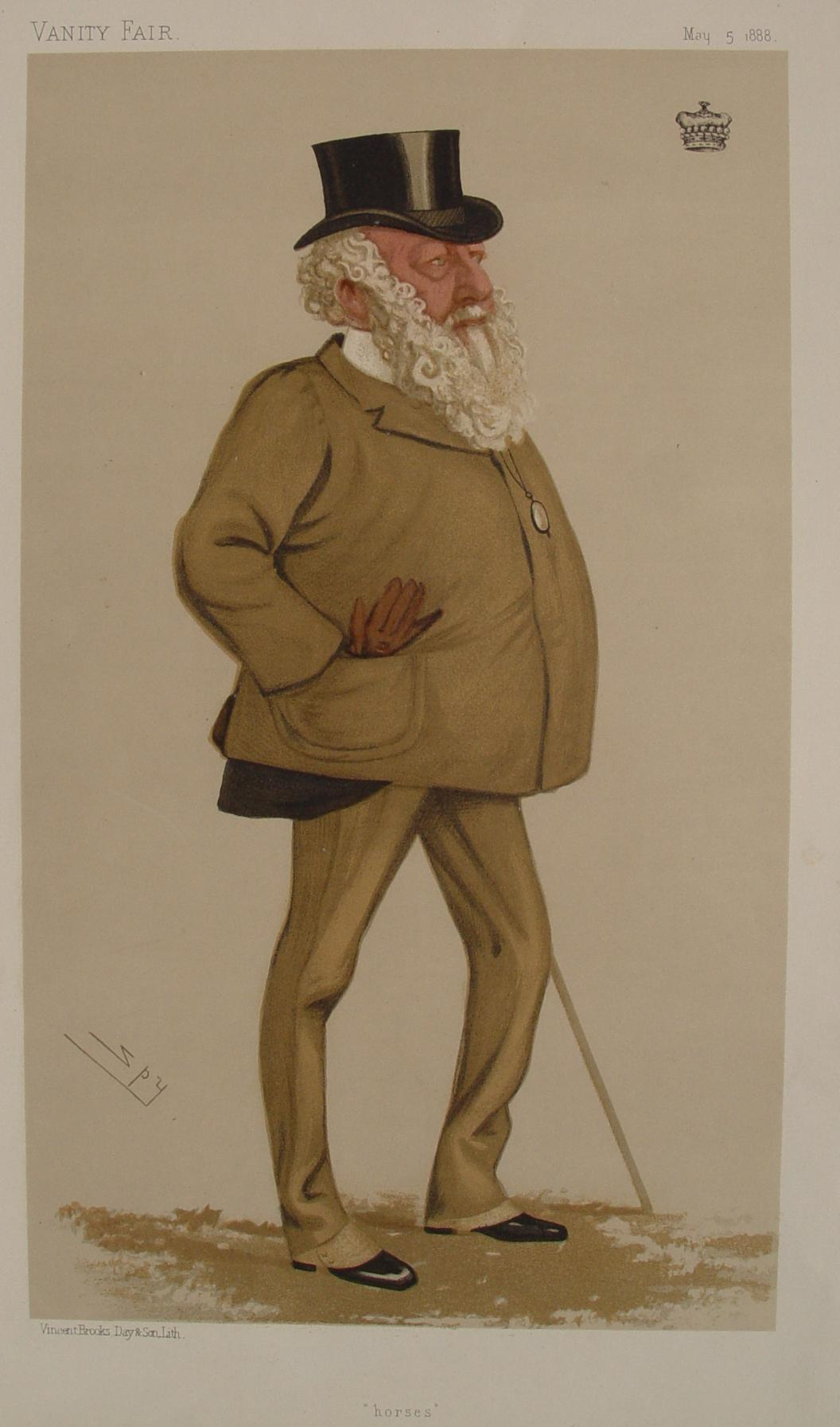
- "Horses". Caricature by Spy published in Vanity Fair in 1888.

Member of Parliament for Carrickfergus
- In office 1847–1857
- Preceded by: Peter Kirk
- Succeeded by: William Cary Dobbs

Personal details
- Born: Wellington Henry Stapleton-Cotton; 24 November 1818 Saint Thomas, Barbados
- Died: 1 December 1891 (aged 73) St James's Place, London
- Spouse: Susan Alice Sitwell (m. 1844; died 1869)
- Relations: Francis Stapleton-Cotton, 4th Viscount Combermere (grandson); Richard Stapleton-Cotton (grandson); Charles Paget, 6th Marquess of Anglesey (grandson)
- Children: 4
- Parent(s): Stapleton Stapleton-Cotton, 1st Viscount Combermere; Caroline Greville
- Education: Eton College; Christ Church, Oxford

Colonel Wellington Henry Stapleton-Cotton, 2nd Viscount Combermere (24 November 1818 – 1 December 1891) was a British soldier and Conservative politician.

== Early life ==
Combermere was born at Duncombe House, St. Thomas, Barbados, the son of Field Marshal Stapleton Stapleton-Cotton, 1st Viscount Combermere (then Governor of Barbados and the Windward Islands), and Caroline, daughter of William Greville.

He was educated at Audlem Grammar School, Cheshire, and Eton College, then briefly attended Christ Church, Oxford in 1837 before entering the army.

== Military and political career ==
Stapleton-Cotton was commissioned into the 7th Hussars in 1837, and served in Canada, where the regiment took part in suppressing the Papineau Rebellion, before returning to England in 1841, when he exchanged his commission into the 1st Life Guards. He was promoted captain in 1846, and major in 1850, holding a staff position as Secretary to the Master General of Ordnance from March to December 1852. He was promoted to lieutenant-colonel in 1857, and achieved the rank of full colonel in 1861, retiring from the army in 1866.

Throughout his military career and on Combermere distinguished himself as a sportsman acquiring a reputation of being a good shooter, steeple chase rider, and keen fly-fisherman. He also bred horses, was a keen fox-hunter, and often judged at the Royal Agricultural and other shows in Islington and Birmingham.

In 1847, he was returned to Parliament for Carrickfergus, a seat he held until 1857. In 1865 he succeeded his father in the viscountcy and entered the House of Lords.

As owner of Combermere Abbey, his Cheshire seat, he twice rented the mansion to the Empress Elisabeth of Austria in 1881 and 1882. He enabled alterations to be made for her stays, accommodating her 80-strong retinue, which were paid for by the Emperor.

== Personal life ==
In 1844 Lord Combermere married Susan Alice Sitwell. She was the daughter of Sir George Sitwell, 2nd Baronet of Renishaw Hall and Susan Tait, sister of The Most Rev. & Rt. Hon. Archibald Campbell Tait, Archbishop of Canterbury. Before her death in 1869, they were the parents of two sons and two daughters:

- Robert Wellington Stapleton-Cotton (1845–1898), who married Isabel Marian (née Chetwynd) Poole, the former wife of the High Sheriff of Cheshire Cudworth Halsted Poole of Marbury Hall.
- Col. Hon. Richard Southwell George Stapleton-Cotton (1849–1925), the Inspector-General of British Guiana Police from 1889 to 1891; he married Hon. Jane Charlotte Methuen, second daughter of Frederick Methuen, 2nd Baron Methuen, in 1870.
- Hon. Susan Caroline Mary Stapleton-Cotton (d. 1916), who married Lt.-Col. Cecil Lennox Peel, fourth son of Laurence Peel (sixth son of Sir Robert Peel, 1st Baronet) and Lady Jane Lennox (herself the fourth daughter of Charles Lennox, 4th Duke of Richmond) in 1867.
- Hon. Hester Alice Stapleton-Cotton (d. 1930), who married Lord Alexander Victor Paget, second son of Henry Paget, 2nd Marquess of Anglesey and his second wife Henrietta Maria Bagot (third daughter of Rt. Hon. Sir Charles Bagot), in 1880.

Susan died in August 1869. Lord Combermere survived his wife by 22 years and died of coronary thrombosis at his London home in St James' Place in December 1891, aged 73, seven weeks after being run over by a horse-drawn carriage. He was buried at St Margaret's Church, Wrenbury, Cheshire. He was succeeded in the viscountcy by his eldest son, Robert.

=== Lord Combermere's ghost photo ===
The 2nd Viscount Combermere became a posthumous celebrity in connection with "Lord Combermere's Ghost Photo", taken in 1891 by Sybell Corbet. She was Lady Combermere's sister and staying at Combermere Abbey at that time. She set up her camera with its shutter open for one hour in the Abbey Library while the entire staff were out, attending Lord Combermere's funeral at St Margaret's Church, Wrenbury, some four miles away. When the plate was developed, the transparent image of a man sitting in one of the library chairs was noticed. Many of the staff said that the image looked like the late 2nd Viscount, and the apparition happened to be sitting in Lord Combermere's favourite chair. It is thought by some that a servant might have come into the room and sat briefly in the chair, thus creating the image. This idea was refuted by members of Lord Combermere's household. Lord Combermere's father, the 1st Viscount, had been involved in a mysterious incident himself several years earlier while serving as Governor of Barbados when he had the Chase Vault opened and carefully examined in search of an explanation for the "moving coffins" there.

Parliament of the United Kingdom
Preceded by Peter Kirk	Member of Parliament for Carrickfergus; 1847–1857	Succeeded by William Cary Dobbs
Peerage of the United Kingdom
Preceded by Stapleton Stapleton-Cotton	Viscount Combermere; 1865–1891	Succeeded by Robert Wellington Stapleton-Cotton
