= Robert Torrens (Irish politician) =

Irish politician (1810–1874)

Robert Torrens MP

Member of Parliament for Carrickfergus
- In office 6 May 1859 – 21 November 1868
- Preceded by: William Cary Dobbs
- Succeeded by: Marriott Dalway

Personal details
- Born: 1810
- Died: 23 December 1874 (aged 63–64)
- Party: Conservative

Robert Torrens (1810 – 23 December 1874) was an Irish Conservative politician.

He was elected as the Member of Parliament (MP) for Carrickfergus at the 1859 general election and held the seat until the 1868 general election.

Parliament of the United Kingdom
Preceded by William Cary Dobbs	Member of Parliament for Carrickfergus; 1859 – 1868	Succeeded by Marriott Dalway
