= William Sambach =

English-born lawyer and politician

Sir William Sambach (c. 1601-1653) was an English-born lawyer and politician of the seventeenth century who spent much of his career in Ireland, but was driven back to England by the political turmoil of the 1640s, and died there.

== Background ==
He was the son of John Sambach of Snowshill, Broadway, Worcestershire and Elizabeth Aston, daughter of Sir Edward Aston of Tixall, Staffordshire and his second wife Anne Lucy, daughter of Sir Thomas Lucy. Elizabeth was thus a sister of Walter Aston, 1st Lord Aston of Forfar. The Astons were one of the most prominent Roman Catholic families in England, but the Sambachs, as far as is known, conformed to the Church of England. His parents' marriage took place in 1600.

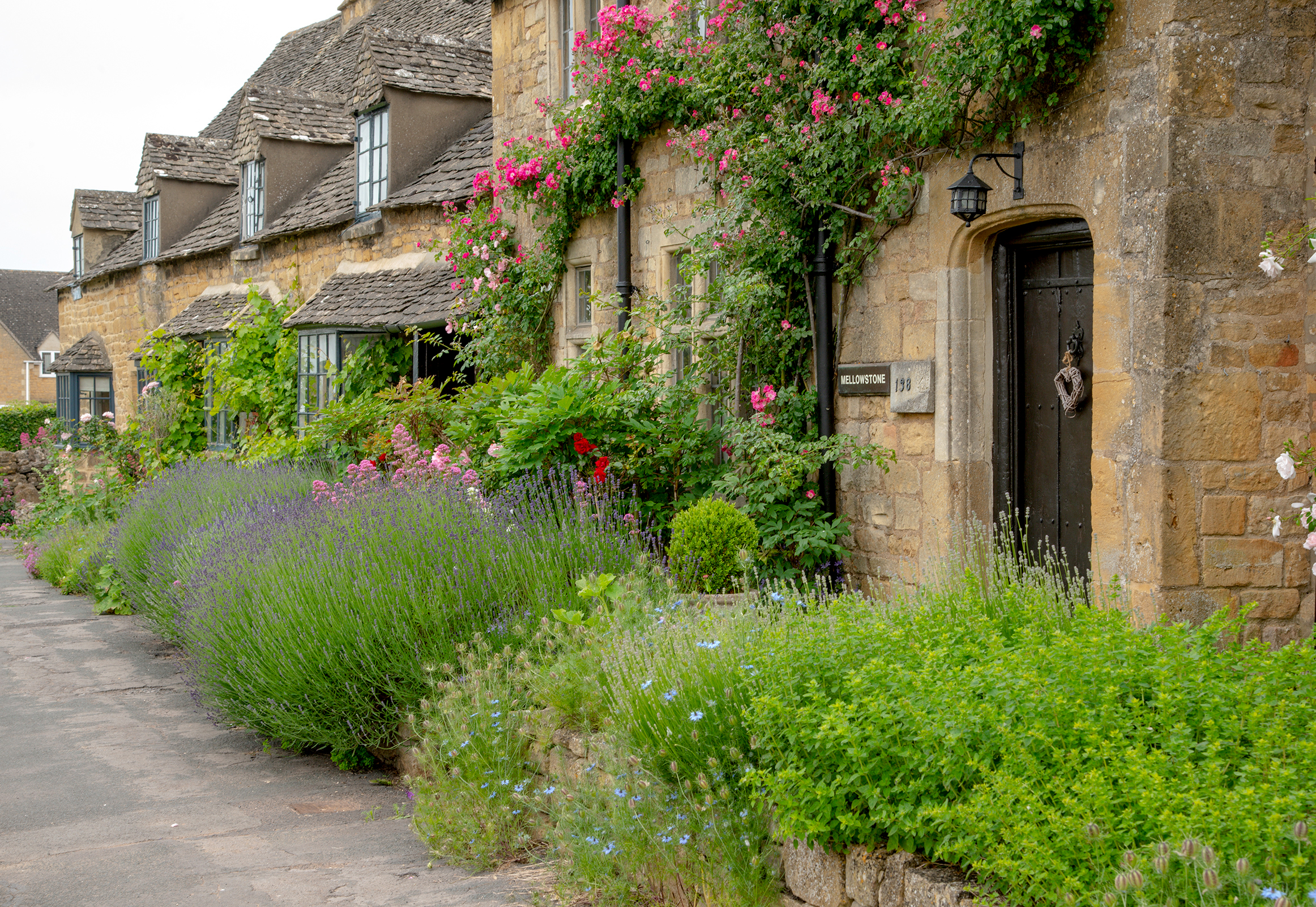
Broadway, Worcestershire, where William grew up and probably spent his last years

His surname is probably a variant of Sandbach. The Sambach family has been settled in Broadway for some generations and were still there in the early 1700s.

Since that family preserved a collection of his papers it is likely that they were related to the Sandbachs of Tarporley, Cheshire, later famous as the owners of Hafodunos Hall.

== Career ==
Little is known of his early career. He arrived in Ireland before 1630, when he was still in his twenties. From the early 1630s onwards he was a key member of the entourage of Thomas Wentworth, 1st Earl of Strafford, the Lord Lieutenant of Ireland, to whom he seems to have been personally close. He became Recorder of Carrickfergus in 1630 (this was a free election by popular vote of the town corporation, not a Crown appointment) and then Second Serjeant in 1637. He was allowed to hold both offices at once, probably because his salary as Serjeant was thought to be inadequate, while the Recordership was notoriously ill-paid (the salary was £20 per annum, later reduced to £10).

In 1640 he was elected to the Irish House of Commons as member for Carrickfergus and in the same year became Solicitor General for Ireland. After the downfall and execution of Strafford for treason in 1641, Sambach continued to defend his policies; during the comprehensive attack by the Irish Parliament on Strafford's rule known as "the Queries", Sambach was one of the few MPs to speak in Strafford's defence, and to denounce the Queries. Precisely when he stepped down as Solicitor General is unclear: in the confusion of the times, the office simply seems to have lapsed, and he was not replaced until 1657. He stepped down as Recorder of Carrickfergus in 1641 in favour of Roger Lyndon.

== The 1641 Rebellion and after ==
During the Irish Rebellion of 1641 he remained a committed Royalist, and by his own account suffered much damage to his property as a result. He lived at Balyna, near Moyvalley, County Kildare: in 1642 he petitioned the Crown for redress for the great loss he had suffered through attacks on his lands by the rebels, which he estimated at £33800, an enormous sum at the time.

He had returned to England by 1649, when he purchased an estate at Bretforton in Worcestershire. A much later lawsuit suggests that he also had estates at Evesham, though his main residence was the old family home at Snowshill, Broadway. He is heard of acting as a justice of the peace in Worcestershire in 1651, which suggests that, like many former Royalists, he had made his peace with the Cromwellian regime. He died in 1653.

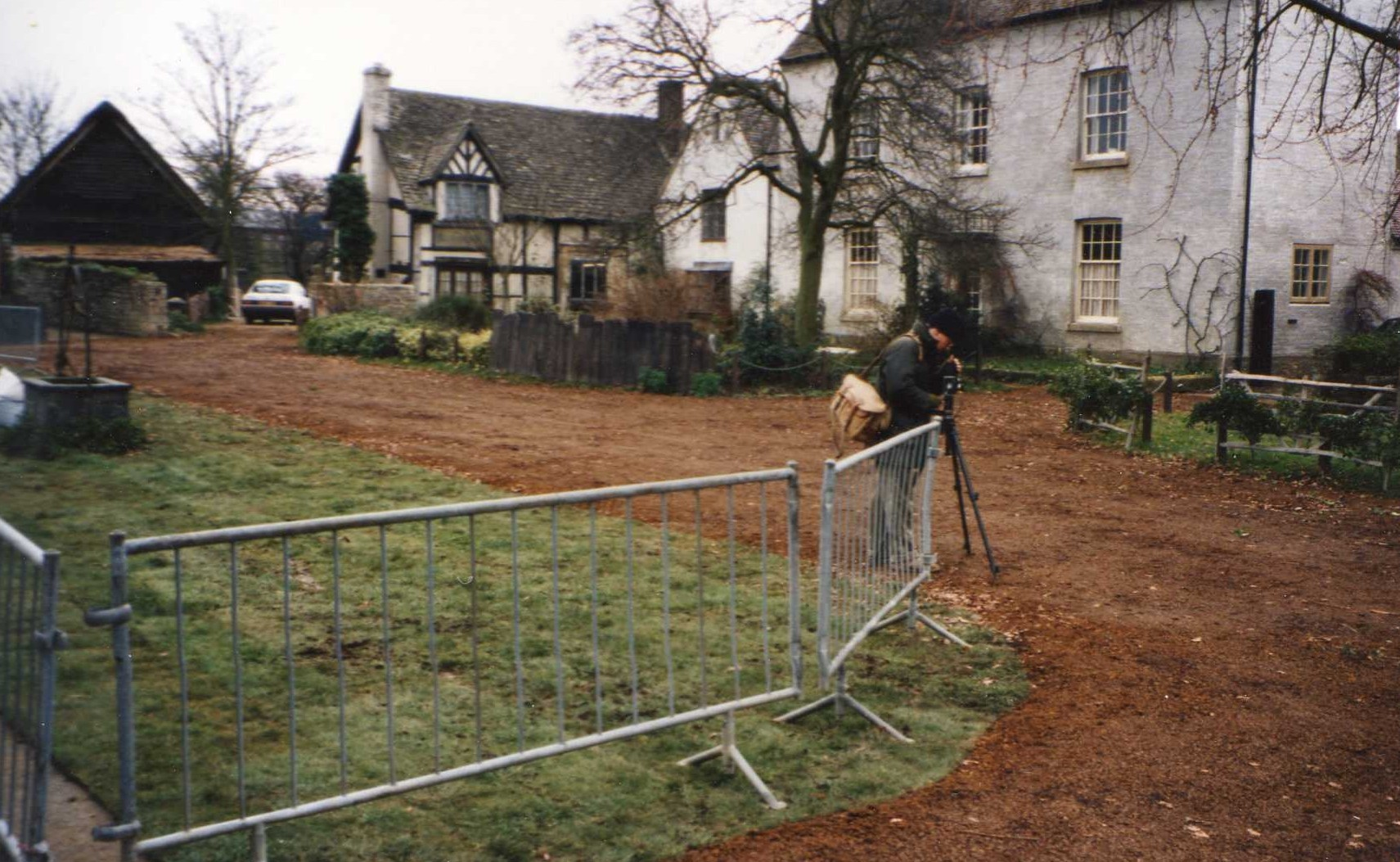
Bretforton, where William spent his last years

== Family ==
He was married, but little is known about his wife, except that she outlived him and was buried at the old Sambach family home at Broadway in 1670. As well as (probably) one son, he had at least one daughter, whose first name is unknown: she married John Moore of Croghan, County Offaly, eldest son of Thomas Moore and Margaret Forth, daughter of Sir Ambrose Forth and Anne Cusack, and had five children:

- one surviving son Thomas, who was the father of John Moore, 1st Baron Moore, and grandfather of Charles Moore, 1st Earl of Charleville
- Margaret, who married Richard Woodfall
- Jane, who married Geoffrey Lyons of Killeen, County Laois
- two sons who died in infancy

A lawsuit entitled Sambach v Sambach in 1707 concerned the right of a small boy called William Sambach of Snowshill to possession of Broadway and Evesham, which had belonged to his father: he was almost certainly a descendant of Sir William.
