= James Craig (MP for Carrickfergus) =

Irish politician (1759–1833)

James Craig (1759 – 1 June 1833) was an Irish Whig legislator who represented the constituency of Carrickfergus in the Parliament of the United Kingdom from 31 March 1807 to 5 November 1812.

A native of the town of Carrickfergus in County Antrim, James Craig was the only son and namesake of James Craig, also of Carrickfergus, and his wife, Jane, born in the Antrim townland of Prospect. In 1779 he was a young officer in the Irish Volunteers and, in 1792–93, a captain in the town's own force, the Carrickfergus True Blues. Also in 1792, he purchased the centuries-old local historical fortification of Scoutbush, having it renovated and established as his own family residence and, in approximately 1800, initiated the construction of another prestigious local house, Glyn Park.

He unsuccessfully stood for local election in 1797, but ultimately, on 27 September 1802, gained the office of burgess. In the March 1807 by-election and the 29 April general election, he represented the interests of Downshire and was elected to Parliament. On 24 April 1812, he voted for the Catholic relief bill, after having stated, four days earlier, that Belfast Protestants supported Catholic claims. Five months later, on 29 September, parliament was dissolved and, at the 1812 general election, he was declared an "irregular candidate" and lost his seat. Records indicate that in addition to serving as burgess, Craig also held the local offices of deputy mayor and magistrate. He was twice married, once widowed and the father of four sons and four daughters.

Parliament of the United Kingdom
Preceded by Lord Spencer Chichester	Member of Parliament for Carrickfergus; 1807 – 1812	Succeeded by Arthur Chichester
