= Refusal to serve in a public office =

Refusal to serve in a public office was an offence under the common law of England and Wales and Ireland. The offence is currently regarded as obsolete, and it extended only to the appointment of high sheriffs.

As a common law offence, it was tried on indictment and could be punished by an unlimited fine and/or period of imprisonment. In 1897, Captain Conway Higginson was prosecuted by writ of criminal information at the Queen's Bench in Dublin for refusing to serve as high sheriff of the county of the town of Carrickfergus. Peter O'Brien, the Lord Chief Justice of Ireland, regarded it as a test case; he directed the jury to find Higginson guilty and fined him £5.

Members of the House of Commons of the United Kingdom or candidates for election were exempt from the requirement to accept public office where it would cause them to be disqualified from being MPs, although this exemption did not extend to requirements to serve in the armed forces.
