= George Chichester, 2nd Marquess of Donegall =

Anglo-Irish politician (1769–1844)

The Most Honourable The Marquess of Donegall KP PC (Ire)
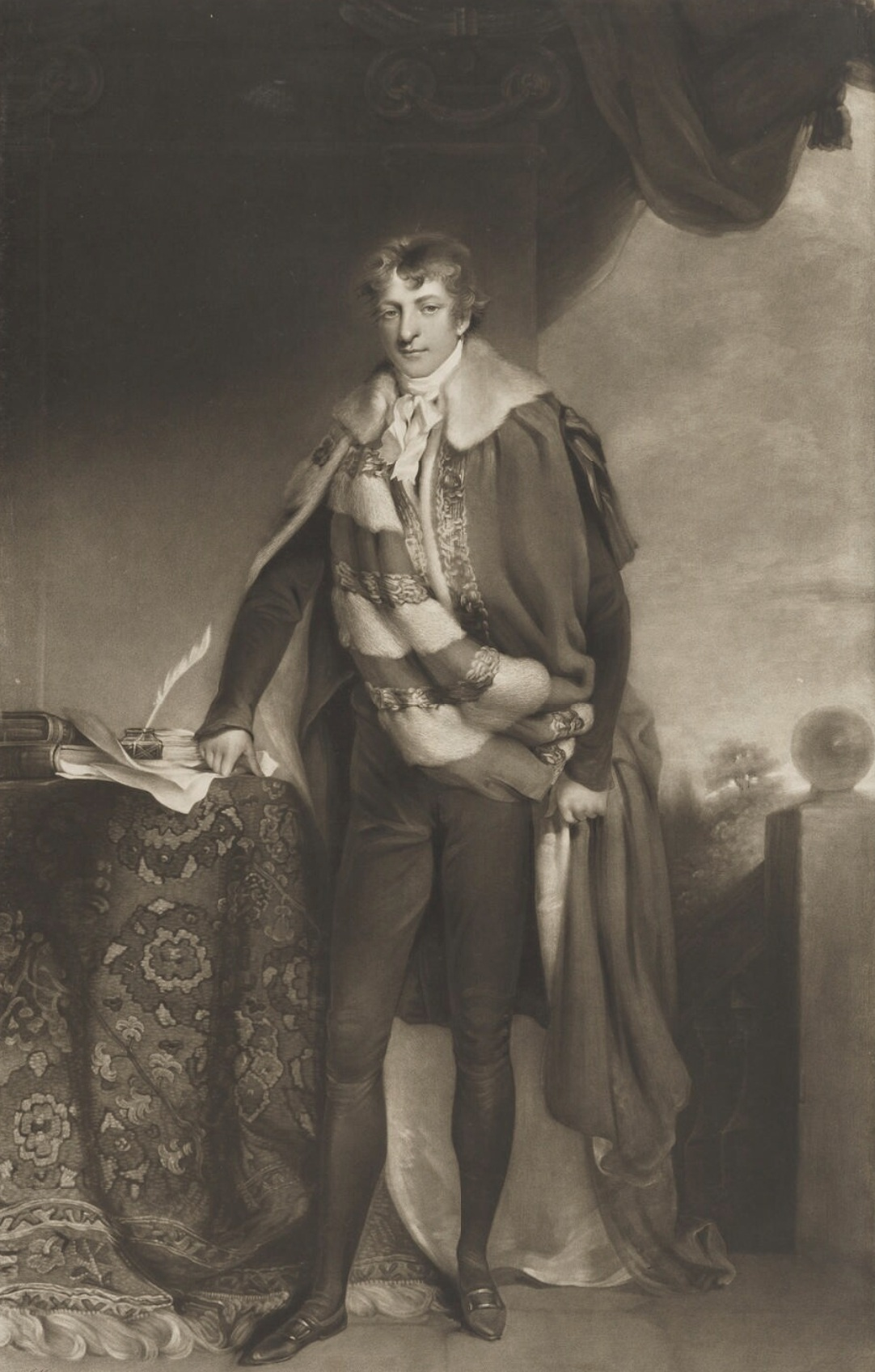
- Engraving by Charles Turner after a John James Masquerier portrait, 1800

Member of the House of Lords (Note: As Baron Fisherwick.)
- Lord Temporal
- In office 5 January 1799 – 5 October 1844
- Preceded by: The 1st Marquess of Donegall
- Succeeded by: The 3rd Marquess of Donegall (Note: He was already a member of the House of Lords, as he had been created Baron Ennishowen and Carrickfergus in 1841.)

Personal details
- Born: George Augustus Chichester; 14 August 1769
- Died: 5 October 1844 (aged 75)
- Spouse: Anna May
- Children: George Chichester, 3rd Marquess of Donegall; Edward Chichester, 4th Marquess of Donegall
- Parent: Arthur Chichester, 1st Marquess of Donegall (father)
- Other titles: 6th Earl of Donegall; 7th Viscount Chichester; 7th Baron Chichester; 2nd Baron Fisherwick

George Augustus Chichester, 2nd Marquess of Donegall (14 August 1769 – 5 October 1844), styled Viscount Chichester until 1791 and Earl of Belfast from 1791 to 1799, was an Anglo-Irish politician.

== Biography ==
He was born into an Ulster aristocratic family at St James's, Westminster, and served for less than a year as a representative in the Irish House of Commons for Carrickfergus before succeeding his father as Marquess of Donegall in 1799 and the proprietor of Belfast..

Lord Donegall was admitted to the Irish Privy Council in 1803 and later served as Lord Lieutenant of County Donegal from 1831 until his death. He was also made a Knight of the Order of St Patrick in 1821 on the occasion of King George IV's visit to Ireland

In Belfast, those who had engaged in the reform and patriotic politics of the 1790s remained critical of Donegall's role as the town's pocket borough master. As they had been in the Dublin parliament, in the new United Kingdom parliament, Belfast's two MPs were his exclusive nominees. Yet veterans of both reform and rebellion found in Donegall a patron's for their civic initiatives. In 1810, Donegall leased the land, and laid the foundation stone, for William Drennan's progressively conceived Belfast Academical Institution. In 1808, he had headed the list of subscribers for the Belfast Harp Society, dedicated to "preserving the national music and national instrument of Ireland" and to promoting interest the country's language, history and antiquities.

In 1809, he leased land on the east side of Donegall Street for building the town's second Roman Catholic Church, St Patricks.

A lifelong gambler, Lord Donegall married the daughter of Edward May, a moneylender and owner of a gambling house. This may have been an agreement to resolve some debts. In 1818, it came to light that Anna May was illegitimate and had been underage at the time of the marriage. As a result of a 1753 law, the marriage was declared invalid, which would have disinherited the children from the titles. Proceedings were put in place to resolve the issue, but it was the change to the marriage act in 1822 which allowed the eldest son to retain his place in the line of inheritance.

Lord Donegall died heavily in debt in 1844 at his home at Ormeau, County Down (which formed the basis of Ormeau Park), and was buried in St Nicholas's Church, Carrickfergus.

== Arms ==
Coat of arms of George Chichester, 2nd Marquess of Donegall
Coronet That of a marquess. Crest A stork, proper, wings expanded, holding in its beak an eel, argent, head or. Escutcheon Quarterly: 1st and 4th, chequy, or and gule, a chief vair (Chichester); 2nd and 3rd, azure fretty argent (Etchingham). Supporters Two wolves gules, ducally gorged and chained or. Motto Invitum sequitur honor (Honour follows, though unsought for). Orders The Most Illustrious Order of St. Patrick - Knight (KP).

== Notes ==
Parliament of Ireland
Preceded by Ezekiel Davys Wilson; Lord Spencer Chichester	Member of Parliament for Carrickfergus; 1798–1799; With: Ezekiel Davys Wilson	Succeeded by Ezekiel Davys Wilson; Noah Dalway
Honorary titles
New office	Lord Lieutenant of Donegal; 1831–1844	Succeeded by The Duke of Abercorn
Peerage of Ireland
Preceded by Arthur Chichester	Marquess of Donegall; 1799–1844	Succeeded by George Chichester
Preceded by Arthur Chichester	Earl of Donegall; 1799–1844	Succeeded by George Chichester
Preceded by Arthur Chichester	Viscount Chichester; 1799–1844	Succeeded by George Chichester
Preceded by Arthur Chichester	Baron Chichester; 2nd creation 1799–1844	Succeeded by George Chichester
Peerage of Great Britain
Preceded by Arthur Chichester	Baron Fisherwick; 1799–1844; Member of the House of Lords (1799–1844)	Succeeded by George Chichester
