= William Cary Dobbs =

Irish Conservative politician and barrister

William Cary Dobbs QC

Member of Parliament for Carrickfergus
- In office 2 April 1857 – 6 May 1859
- Preceded by: Wellington Stapleton-Cotton
- Succeeded by: Robert Torrens

Personal details
- Born: 17 August 1806 Belfast, Ireland, United Kingdom
- Died: 17 April 1869 (aged 62) London, United Kingdom
- Resting place: Carrickfergus, Ireland, United Kingdom
- Party: Conservative
- Spouse: Elinor Jones Westropp (m. 1834)
- Children: Five
- Parent(s): Robert Conway Dobbs; Wilhelmina Josepha Bristow
- Education: Trinity College, Cambridge

William Cary Dobbs QC (17 August 1806 – 17 April 1869) was an Irish Conservative politician, and barrister. He sat in the House of Commons of the United Kingdom from 1857 to 1859 as the Member of Parliament (MP) for Carrickfergus.

== Early life and family ==
Born in Belfast, Dobbs was the only son of five children of Reverend Robert Conway Dobbs and Wilhelmina Josepha née Bristow. He was admitted to Trinity College, Cambridge, and graduated with a wrangler's degree in 1827, and a Master of Arts in 1830, before being called to the bar in 1833.

He married Elinor Jones Westropp, daughter of Henry Sheares Westropp, in 1834 and they had five children: Elinor Dobbs (1838–1892); Wilhelmena Josepha Dobbs (1840–1842); Robert Conway Dobbs (1842–1915); Charity Frances Dobbs (1846–1893); and Henry Sheares Dobbs.

In 1851, he became a crown prosecutor for Drogheda and Dundalk on the Irish north-eastern circuit, before being elevated to a Queen's Counsel in 1858.

== Member of Parliament ==
Ahead of the 1857 general election, Dobbs was selected as the Conservative candidate for Carrickfergus, a seat for which his grandfather, Conway Richard Dobbs had represented in the Parliament of Ireland and his cousin, also named Conway Richard Dobbs, had represented from 1832 to 1833.

His candidature was successful and, in Parliament, he promoted free trade, and, as an Anglican promised constituents he would uphold Protestantism and protect the constitution. He sought clarification of the law on tenant rights, and favoured ending the Maynooth Grant, arguing public money should not be used to support the church. While he also supported an extension of education and the franchise, he was cautious about the Irish national school system and felt religion should feature highly in education.

Just before the 1859 general election, Dobbs was made a judge in the Landed Estates Court in Dublin, making him ineligible to stand at the election, and ending his political career after one term.

== Death ==
While seeking medical attention in London in 1869, Dobbs died. By this time, he had become a senior judge of the court, recognised by the public for his "amiable character... intelligent and cultivated mind... [and] the consistency and uprightness of his conduct". His body was later returned to Dublin, before being interred at the family burial ground near Carrickfergus.

== Arms ==
Coat of arms of William Cary Dobbs

Crest
On a wreath a unicorn's head erased Argent.
Escutcheon
Party per pale Azure and Sable a chevron engrailed gouttée between three unicorns' heads erased all counterchanged with a crescent for difference.
Motto
Amor Dei Et Proximi Summa Beatitudo

Parliament of the United Kingdom
Preceded by Wellington Stapleton-Cotton	Member of Parliament for Carrickfergus; 1857–1859	Succeeded by Robert Torrens
