= Carrickfergus (barony) =

Coordinates: 54.737°N 5.849°W

Carrickfergus Carraig Fhearghais (Irish)
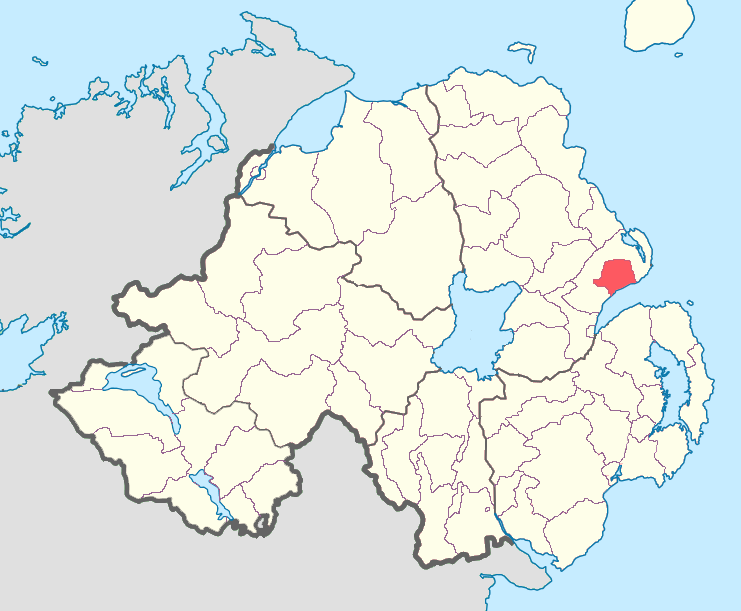
- Location of the barony of Carrickfergus, County Antrim, Northern Ireland.
- Sovereign state: United Kingdom
- Country: Northern Ireland
- County: Antrim

Carrickfergus is a barony in County Antrim, Northern Ireland. Originally referred to as Knockfergus in the 1665 map, Vltonia Hibernis Cui-Guilly by Joan Blaeu. It is bounded on the south-east by Belfast Lough, and otherwise surrounded by the barony of Belfast Lower. It is coextensive with the civil parish of Carrickfergus or St Nicholas and corresponds to the former county of the town of Carrickfergus, a county corporate encompassing Carrickfergus town.

== History ==
Carrickfergus Castle was the stronghold of the Earl of Ulster in the Anglo-Norman period, and Carrickfergus or Knockfergus was one of the medieval counties into which the Earldom was divided. After the Tudor reconquest of Ireland, the east coast of Ulster was rationalised into counties Antrim and Down, but Carrickfergus retained its ancient status as a separate corporate county. Whereas most such counties comprised an urban municipal borough and surrounding rural liberties, the royal charter of James I made the borough of Carrickfergus coterminous with the county of the town. The Municipal Corporations (Ireland) Act 1840 formally abolished the borough, and replaced its corporation with town commissioners. The grand jury of the county of the town of Carrickfergus was unchanged by the 1840 act. Till 1850, Carrickfergus was also county town of Antrim; the Town Gaol and Town Courthouse were for the county of the town, while the County Gaol and County Courthouse were separate buildings within the town regarded as exclaves of county Antrim, but from 1800 both counties used the same facilities. The parliamentary borough of Carrickfergus was coterminous with the county of the town from the Parliamentary Boundaries (Ireland) Act 1832 till it was abolished under the Redistribution of Seats Act 1885. There were two sheriffs of Carrickfergus chosen annually by the corporation, reduced to one after the corporation was abolished. There was no separate county governor or lieutenant, the Lord Lieutenant of Antrim having authority within Carrickfergus; the "governor of Carrickfergus" was not a county or town official, but rather the garrison governor of Carrickfergus Castle. Similarly, for purposes of Civil Bill Courts and (from 1793) militia, Carrickfergus was treated as part of the barony of Belfast Lower in county Antrim.

In 1899, under the terms of the Local Government (Ireland) Act 1898, the Local Government Board for Ireland combined the judicial county of the town of Carrickfergus and most of the judicial county of Antrim into the administrative county of Antrim. Thereafter the area was sometimes but not always considered as a barony. In the topographical index of the 1926 census, Carrickfergus is not in the list of baronies, and the "barony" value listed for the corresponding townlands is blank. However, notices in The Belfast Gazette from the same era refer to the "barony of Carrickfergus", and it is listed on the Public Record Office of Northern Ireland website.

The area subject to the town commissioners of Carrickfergus became an urban district; the rest of the county of the town became the Carrickfergus Rural district electoral division (DED) of Larne rural district. Eden DED was split out of Carrickfergus Rural DED from 1908. Under the Local Government Act (Northern Ireland) 1972 the whole barony forms part of the jurisdiction of Carrickfergus Borough Council, which in 2015 merged into Mid and East Antrim Borough Council.

== Settlements ==
Below is a list of settlements in Carrickfergus:

=== Towns ===
- Carrickfergus
- Greenisland

=== Villages ===
- Boneybefore

=== Population centres ===
- Eden
- MileBush
- Woodburn

=== Civil parishes ===
Carrickfergus or St Nicholas is the only civil parish in the barony and has 5 townlands.

=== Townlands ===
The county of the town of Carrickfergus in 1891 comprised five townlands: Carrickfergus (comprising the historic town, and most of the later urban district); Commons, Middle Division, and North East Division (in DED of Eden), and West Division (DED of Carrickfergus Rural; at 6732 acres, the largest townland in Northern Ireland). There was uncertainty as to whether the townlands of Ballymena Little and Straidland formed part of Carrickfergus; an 1810 court case decided they belonged to the corporation but were not part of the county of the town. The parish boundaries were also uncertain; the Public Record Office of Northern Ireland website lists four townlands in the parish of "Carrickfergus or St. Nicholas'", namely Carrickfergus, Commons, Green Island, and West Division.

== Railway ==
On the Belfast–Larne railway line, stations in Carrickfergus barony are Greenisland, Trooperslane, Clipperstown, Carrickfergus, and Downshire.

== Sources ==
- "County of the Town of Carrickfergus". Municipal Corporations (Ireland) Appendix, part II. Reports from Commissioners. Vol. 8. HMSO. 1835. pp. 741–787.
- Topographical Index. Census of Northern Ireland, 1926. Belfast: HMSO. 1929.
- McSkimin, Samuel; M'Crum, Elizabeth J. (1909). The history and antiquities of the county of the town of Carrickfergus (New ed.). Belfast: Mullan, J. Cleeland, Davidson & M'Cormack.
