= Alexander Dalway =

Irish politician

Alexander Dalway was an Irish politician.

Dalway was born in Carrickfergus and educated at Trinity College, Dublin.

Dalway represented Carrickfergus from 1715 to 1719.
