= Conway Benning =

Anglican priest in Ireland

Conway Benning, LL.D was an Anglican priest in Ireland in the late 18th century.

Benning was educated at Trinity College, Dublin. He was Archdeacon of Dromore from 1770 until his resignation in 1777.
