= Marriott Dalway =

Irish politician

Marriott Dalway MP

Member of Parliament for Carrickfergus
- In office 21 November 1868 – 6 April 1880
- Preceded by: Robert Torrens
- Succeeded by: Thomas Greer

Personal details
- Born: 17 November 1832
- Died: 10 January 1914 (aged 81)
- Party: Liberal
- Spouse: Elizabeth Barnes (m. 1859)
- Children: Four
- Parent(s): Marriott Dalway; Euphemia Henry

Marriott Robert Dalway (17 November 1832 – 10 January 1914) was an Irish politician. Although primarily known as an Irish Liberal Party member, various sources also designate him as conservative or liberal-conservative.

He was elected as the Member of Parliament (MP) for Carrickfergus at the 1868 general election and held the seat until the 1880 general election.

Dalway was also a High Sheriff of County Antrim in 1859.

He married Elizabeth Barnes, daughter of Andrew Armstrong Barnes and Margaret Livingston, in 1859 and together they had four children:

- Elizabeth (1860–1946)
- Marriott William (born 1861)
- Robert (born 1862)
- John (born 1865)

Andrew Armstrong (born 1872) Livingston (1864-1866) Amy (1866-1867)

He died 10 January 1914 in Lorne, Victoria.

Parliament of the United Kingdom
Preceded by Robert Torrens	Member of Parliament for Carrickfergus; 1868 – 1880	Succeeded by Thomas Greer
