= Carrickfergus (Parliament of Ireland constituency) =

Pre-1801 Irish constituency

- Former borough constituency for the Irish House of Commons
- County: County Antrim
- Borough: Carrickfergus

1326–1801
- Seats: 2
- Replaced by: Carrickfergus (UKHC)

Carrickfergus was a constituency represented in the Irish House of Commons from 1326 to 1800, the house of representatives of the Kingdom of Ireland.

== Borough ==
This constituency was the county borough of Carrickfergus in County Antrim. It returned two members to the Parliament of Ireland to 1800.

== History ==
In the Patriot Parliament of 1689 summoned by King James II, Carrickfergus was not represented. Following the Acts of Union 1800, the county borough retained one parliamentary seat in the United Kingdom House of Commons.

== Members of Parliament, 1326–1801 ==
Election	First MP		Second MP
1559	James Wingfield		Humphrey Warren
1585	Edward Waterhouse		Thomas Stevenson
1613	Thomas Hibbotts (Note: Knighted in 1618.)		Humphrey Johnson
1634	Thomas Hibbotts		Henry Upton
1640	Sir William Sambach		John Davys
1654–1660	Commonwealth - See Carrickfergus and Belfast (constituency)		
1661	Sir Hercules Davys		Arthur Upton
1689	Carrickfergus was not represented in the Patriot Parliament		
1692	Henry Clements		Henry Davis
1695	Hercules Davys		Henry Davis
1703	Edward Lyndon		Henry Davis
1709	Edward Lyndon		Alexander Denton
1713	John Davys		Arthur Davys
1715	Alexander Dalway		Archibald Edmonstone
1719	Edward Lyndon		Archibald Edmonstone
1727	Arthur Dobbs		John Lyndon
October 1741	Arthur Dobbs		Francis Clements (Note: Declared not duly elected in 1741.)
December 1741	Arthur Dobbs		Arthur Upton
1761	Marriot Dalway		Arthur Upton
1768	John Chichester		Conway Richard Dobbs
1776	Barry Yelverton	Patriot	Conway Richard Dobbs
1784	Waddell Cunningham (Note: Declared not duly elected in 1784.)		Conway Richard Dobbs
1785	Ezekiel Davys Wilson		Conway Richard Dobbs
1790	Ezekiel Davys Wilson		Alexander Hamilton
1797	Ezekiel Davys Wilson		Lord Spencer Stanley Chichester (Note: Also elected for Belfast in 1797, for which he chose to sit.)
1798	Ezekiel Davys Wilson		Earl of Belfast
1799	Ezekiel Davys Wilson		Noah Dalway
1801	Succeeded by the Westminster constituency Carrickfergus		

== Bibliography ==
- O'Hart, John (2007). The Irish and Anglo-Irish Landed Gentry: When Cromwell came to Ireland. Vol. II. Heritage Books. ISBN 978-0-7884-1927-0.
- Leigh Rayment's historical List of Members of the Irish House of Commons. Cites: Johnston-Liik, Edith Mary (2002). The History of the Irish Parliament 1692-1800 (6 volumes). Ulster Historical Foundation.
