= Peter Kirk (MP for Carrickfergus) =

Irish politician

Member of Parliament for Carrickfergus
- In office 10 January 1835 – 3 August 1847
- Preceded by: Conway Richard Dobbs
- Succeeded by: Wellington Stapleton-Cotton

Personal details
- Born: 1800
- Died: 1 November 1856 (aged 55–56)
- Party: Conservative

Peter Kirk (1800 – 1 November 1856) was an Irish Conservative Party politician.

Kirk was elected Conservative MP for Carrickfergus at the 1835 general election and held the seat until 1847, when he stepped down.

He was a member of the Carlton Club.

Parliament of the United Kingdom
Preceded by Conway Richard Dobbs	Member of Parliament for Carrickfergus; 1835–1847	Succeeded by Wellington Stapleton-Cotton
