= Thomas Greer (MP) =

Irish politician

Thomas Greer MP

Member of Parliament for Carrickfergus
- In office 31 March 1880 – 24 November 1885
- Preceded by: Marriott Dalway
- Succeeded by: Constituency Abolished

Personal details
- Born: 4 April 1837
- Died: 20 September 1905 (aged 68)
- Party: Conservative

Thomas Greer (4 April 1837 – 20 September 1905) was an Irish Conservative politician. He was the Member of Parliament (MP) for Carrickfergus from 1880 to 1885.
