= Conway Richard Dobbs =

Irish politician

Conway Richard Dobbs (1795 – 28 February 1886) was an Irish politician.

Dobbs lived at Acton House in County Armagh, and served as a lieutenant in the Royal Navy. He stood in Carrickfergus at the 1832 UK general election, and was elected as a Tory. However, an election petition was raised, and he was unseated, and the seat remained unfilled until the next general election.

In 1841, Dobbs served as Sheriff of Antrim. He was placed on the naval reserve list in 1851 and retired as a commander in 1864.

Parliament of the United Kingdom
Preceded by Lord George Hill	Member of Parliament for Carrickfergus; 1832–1833	Succeeded by Peter Kirk
