= Carrickfergus (UK Parliament constituency) =

UK parliamentary constituency in Ireland, 1801–1885

- Former borough constituency for the House of Commons
- County: County Antrim
- Borough: Carrickfergus

1801–1885
- Seats: 1
- Created from: Carrickfergus
- Replaced by: East Antrim

Carrickfergus was a United Kingdom Parliament constituency in Ireland represented from 1801 to 1885 by one MP.

== History and boundaries ==
This constituency was the parliamentary borough of Carrickfergus which was a county corporate in County Antrim. Prior to 1801, Carrickfergus was a two-seat borough constituency in the Irish House of Commons. Under the Acts of Union 1800, which united the Kingdom of Ireland with the Kingdom of Great Britain to form the United Kingdom of Great Britain and Ireland, it was one of 33 boroughs to retain representation, but was reduced to one MP. Its first MP in 1801 was chosen by lot. The boundary commissioners indicated in their report of January 1832 that they were not authorised to propose a curtailment in the boundaries. It was defined by the Parliamentary Boundaries (Ireland) Act 1832 as: "The County of the Town of Carrickfergus".

It was disenfranchised under the Redistribution of Seats Act 1885, which took effect at the 1885 general election. The county of the town of Carrickfergus became part of the county division of East Antrim.

== Members of Parliament ==
Election	Member	Party	Note
1801, January 1	Noah Dalway		1801: Co-opted
1802, July 30	Lord Spencer Chichester	Tory	Resigned
1807, April 29	James Craig	Whig	Initially elected four weeks earlier, in the 31 March 1807 Carrickfergus by-election
1812, November 5	Arthur Chichester	Tory	
1818, July 1	Earl of Belfast	Tory	
1820, March 16	Sir Arthur Chichester, Bt	Tory	Created Baronet 13 September 1821
1830, August 10	Lord George Hill	Whig	
1832, December 9	Conway Richard Dobbs	Tory	Election declared void on petition
1833, March	Writ suspended		
1835, January 10	Peter Kirk	Conservative	
1847, August 3	Hon. Wellington Stapleton-Cotton	Conservative	
1857, April 2	William Cary Dobbs	Conservative	
1859, May 6	Robert Torrens	Conservative	
1868, November 21	Marriott Dalway	Liberal-Conservative (Note: Various sources refer to Dalway as Conservative, Liberal, and Liberal-Conservative. Due to his support for Gladstone and Home Rule, he has been designated a Liberal-Conservative.)	
1880, April 2	Thomas Greer	Conservative	Last MP for the constituency
1885	Constituency abolished		

== Election results ==
=== Elections in the 1830s ===
General election 1830: Carrickfergus
Party	Candidate	Votes	%	±%
Whig	George Hill	311	39.1	
Whig	Marcus Hill	241	30.3	
Tory	Charles Adair	198	24.9	
Tory	Arthur Chichester	46	5.8	
Majority		70	8.8	
Turnout		796	c. 92.6	
Registered electors		c. 860		
Whig gain from Tory		Swing		

General election 1831: Carrickfergus
Party	Candidate	Votes	%
Whig	George Hill	Unopposed	
Registered electors		860	
Whig hold			

General election 1832: Carrickfergus
Party	Candidate	Votes	%
Tory	Conway Richard Dobbs	495	52.2
Whig	Arthur Chichester	447	47.2
Tory	James Wills	6	0.6
Majority		48	5.0
Turnout		948	92.6
Registered electors		1,024	
Tory gain from Whig			

- On petition, the election was declared void and the writ for the seat was suspended.

General election 1835: Carrickfergus
Party	Candidate	Votes	%
Conservative	Peter Kirk	Unopposed	
Registered electors		1,431	
Conservative hold			

General election 1837: Carrickfergus
Party	Candidate	Votes	%
Conservative	Peter Kirk	446	51.6
Whig	Matthew Boulton Rennie	418	48.4
Majority		28	3.2
Turnout		864	59.3
Registered electors		1,458	
Conservative hold			

=== Elections in the 1840s ===
General election 1841: Carrickfergus
Party	Candidate	Votes	%	±%
Conservative	Peter Kirk	Unopposed		
Registered electors		1,326		
Conservative hold				

General election 1847: Carrickfergus
Party	Candidate	Votes	%	±%
Conservative	Wellington Stapleton-Cotton	Unopposed		
Registered electors		1,426		
Conservative hold				

=== Elections in the 1850s ===
General election 1852: Carrickfergus
Party	Candidate	Votes	%	±%
Conservative	Wellington Stapleton-Cotton	311	51.3	N/A
Whig	Warren Hastings Leslie Frith	295	48.7	New
Majority		16	2.6	N/A
Turnout		606	84.2	N/A
Registered electors		720		
Conservative hold		Swing	N/A	

General election 1857: Carrickfergus
Party	Candidate	Votes	%	±%
Conservative	William Cary Dobbs	560	59.4	+8.1
Whig	Francis Macdonogh	383	40.6	−8.1
Majority		177	18.8	+16.2
Turnout		943	82.8	−1.4
Registered electors		1,139		
Conservative hold		Swing	+8.1	

General election 1859: Carrickfergus
Party	Candidate	Votes	%	±%
Conservative	Robert Torrens	668	72.1	+12.7
Liberal	William McMechan	259	27.9	−12.7
Majority		409	44.2	+25.4
Turnout		927	74.6	−8.2
Registered electors		1,243		
Conservative hold		Swing	+12.7	

=== Elections in the 1860s ===
General election 1865: Carrickfergus
Party	Candidate	Votes	%	±%
Conservative	Robert Torrens	498	63.6	−8.5
Liberal	Luke White	285	36.4	+8.5
Majority		213	27.2	−17.0
Turnout		783	69.6	−5.0
Registered electors		1,125		
Conservative hold		Swing	−8.5	

General election 1868: Carrickfergus
Party	Candidate	Votes	%	±%
Liberal-Conservative	Marriott Dalway	669	62.2	+25.8
Conservative	Robert Torrens	407	37.8	−25.8
Majority		262	24.4	N/A
Turnout		1,076	83.4	+13.8
Registered electors		1,290		
Liberal-Conservative gain from Conservative		Swing	+25.8	

=== Elections in the 1870s ===
General election 1874: Carrickfergus
Party	Candidate	Votes	%	±%
Liberal-Conservative	Marriott Dalway	628	58.1	−4.1
Conservative	George Augustus Chichester May	452	41.9	+4.1
Majority		176	16.2	−8.2
Turnout		1,080	78.8	−4.6
Registered electors		1,370		
Liberal-Conservative hold		Swing	−4.1	

=== Elections in the 1880s ===
General election 1880: Carrickfergus
Party	Candidate	Votes	%	±%
Conservative	Thomas Greer	591	51.6	+9.7
Liberal-Conservative	Marriott Dalway	554	48.4	−9.7
Majority		37	3.2	N/A
Turnout		1,145	81.0	+2.2
Registered electors		1,414		
Conservative gain from Liberal-Conservative		Swing	+9.7	

== Notes and references ==
=== Sources ===
- Smith, Henry Stooks (1844–50). The Parliaments of England (1st edition published in three volumes)
- Craig, F. W. S., ed. (1973). The Parliaments of England (2nd edition published in one volume). Political Reference Publications
- Walker, B.M., ed. (1978). Parliamentary Election Results in Ireland, 1801–1922. Dublin: Royal Irish Academy. ISBN 0901714127.
- Leigh Rayment's Historical List of MPs – Constituencies beginning with "C" (part 3)
