= Skeffington (disambiguation) =

Skeffington is a village in Leicestershire. It may also refer to:

== People ==
=== Surname ===
- A. M. Skeffington (1890–1976), American optometrist
- Algernon Skeffington, 12th Viscount Massereene (1873–1956), British Army officer and politician
- Anthony Skeffington (died after 1535), English-born cleric and judge in Ireland
- Arthur Skeffington (1909–1971), British politician
- Clotworthy Skeffington, 3rd Viscount Massereene (1661–1714), Anglo-Irish soldier and politician
- Clotworthy Skeffington, 2nd Earl of Massereene (1742–1805), Anglo-Irish peer who was imprisoned in France for almost twenty years for enormous debts
- Clotworthy Skeffington, 11th Viscount Massereene (1842–1905), Anglo-Irish peer
- Hanna Sheehy-Skeffington, suffragette and Irish nationalist (1877 – 1946)
- Henry Skeffington, 3rd Earl of Massereene (1744–1811), Anglo-Irish British Army officer and politician
- Sir John Skeffington, 2nd Baronet (c. 1590–1651), English landowner and politician
- John Skeffington, 2nd Viscount Massereene (1632–1695), Anglo-Irish politician and official
- John Skeffington, 10th Viscount Massereene (1812–1863), Irish poet
- John Skeffington, 14th Viscount Massereene (born 1940), British peer
- Lumley Skeffington (1771–1850), British baronet, fop and playwright
- Richard Skeffington (died 1647), English landowner and Member of Parliament
- Thomas Skevington or Skeffington (died 1533), English Bishop of Bangor
- Thomas Skeffington (MP) (1550–1600), English Member of Parliament for Leicestershire (UK Parliament constituency)
- Thomas Skeffington, 2nd Viscount Ferrard (1772–1843), Irish politician
- William Skeffington (c. 1465–1535), English knight and Lord Deputy of Ireland
- William Skeffington (died 1571), English Member of Parliament
- William John Skeffington (1747–1811), Irish politician

=== Given name ===
- Skeffington Gibbon (fl. c. 1796), Irish writer
- Skeffington Lutwidge (1737–1814), Royal Navy admiral
- Sir Skeffington Smyth, 1st Baronet (1745–1797), Member of Parliament in the Parlement of Ireland

== Fictional characters ==
- Frank Skeffington, protagonist of the 1956 novel The Last Hurrah by Edwin O'Connor
- Job Skeffington, title character of Mr. Skeffington, a 1944 film based on the 1940 novel of the same name, played by Claude Rains

== Titles ==
- Skeffington baronets, two titles, one in the Baronetage of England and one in the Baronetage of Great Britain

== See also ==
- Skivington
