= Clotworthy =

Clotworthy is a surname derived from Clotworthy near Wembworthy, Devon, England. The family inherited the manor of Rashleigh in Wembworthy in the 16th century. Sir Hugh Clotworthy (1569–1630) gained land in Ireland in the Plantation of Ulster and built Antrim Castle there. Clotworthy was used as a given name by his descendants.

== Surname ==
- Bob Clotworthy (1931–2018), an American Olympic diver
- John Clotworthy, 1st Viscount Massereene (died 1665) an Anglo-Irish politician, son of Sir Hugh Clotworthy
- Pauline Clotworthy (1912–2004), an Irish teacher of fashion design
- Robert Clotworthy (born 1955), an American actor and voice actor
- Sarah Clotworthy Stevenson (1824–1885) First Lady of West Virginia, 1869–1871
- William Clotworthy (1926–2021), an American author and television censor

== Given name ==
- Many Viscounts and Earls Massereene (surname Skeffington) descended from John Clotworthy, 1st Viscount Massereene
  - Clotworthy Skeffington, 3rd Viscount Massereene (1661–1714), Anglo-Irish soldier and politician
  - Clotworthy Skeffington, 2nd Earl of Massereene (1742–1805), Anglo-Irish peer who was imprisoned in France for almost twenty years for enormous debts
  - Clotworthy Skeffington, 11th Viscount Massereene (1842–1905), Anglo-Irish peer
- Clotworthy Rowley, 1st Baron Langford (1763–1825), born Clotworthy Taylor, Irish politician
- Clotworthy Soden, eighteenth century Irish Anglican priest
- Clotworthy Upton, 1st Baron Templetown (1721–1785), Anglo-Irish courtier and peer
