= Clotworthy Skeffington =

Clotworthy Skeffington may refer to:

- Clotworthy Skeffington, 3rd Viscount Massereene (1661–1714), Anglo-Irish soldier, politician and peer
- Clotworthy Skeffington, 4th Viscount Massereene (died 1738), Anglo-Irish politician and peer
- Clotworthy Skeffington, 1st Earl of Massereene (1715–1757), Anglo-Irish peer
- Clotworthy Skeffington, 2nd Earl of Massereene (1742–1805), Anglo-Irish peer
- Clotworthy Skeffington, 11th Viscount Massereene (1842–1905), Anglo-Irish peer
