= John Skeffington =

John Skeffington may refer to:

- Sir John Skeffington, 2nd Baronet (c. 1590–1651), English landowner and politician
- John Skeffington, 2nd Viscount Massereene (1632–1695), Anglo-Irish politician and official
- John Skeffington, 10th Viscount Massereene (1812–1863), Irish peer and poet
- John Skeffington, 14th Viscount Massereene (born 1940), British peer
