= Hungarton =

Village in Leicestershire, England

Coordinates: 52.659°N 0.979°W

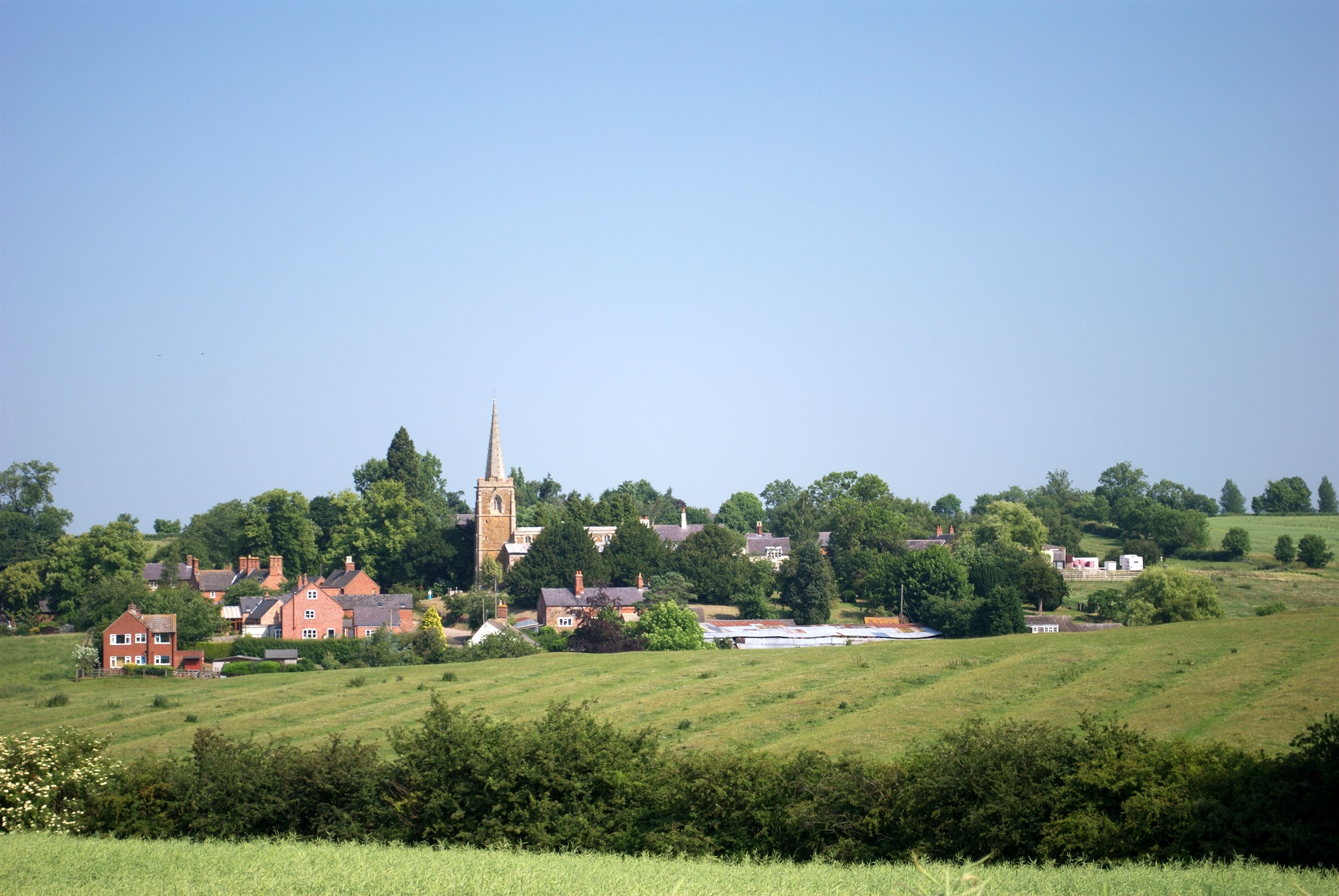
- Hungarton seen from near Quenby Hall

- Location within Leicestershire
- Population: 269 (2001 Census)
- OS grid reference: SK690073
- Civil parish: Hungarton
- District: Harborough
- Shire county: Leicestershire
- Region: East Midlands
- Country: England
- Sovereign state: United Kingdom
- Post town: LEICESTER
- Postcode district: LE7
- Dialling code: 0116
- Police: Leicestershire
- Fire: Leicestershire
- Ambulance: East Midlands
- UK Parliament: Melton and Syston

Hungarton (or Hungerton) is a small village and civil parish in the Harborough district of Leicestershire, England, about 10 miles (16 km) north-east of Leicester and 13 miles (21 km) south-west of Melton Mowbray. The population of the civil parish was 269 at the 2001 census, including Ingarsby, and increased to 289 at the 2011 census.

== Amenities ==
The village has a church, a village hall, a small stream and a Millennium Green. It also has a pub called The Black Boy. Stilton cheese was produced in a dairy in the grounds of Quenby Hall.

The Anglican Church of St John the Baptist is part of a group benefice with Keyham, Billesdon, Goadby and Skeffington. A service is held twice a month.

== Heritage ==
The village features in the 1086 Domesday Book as Hungretone.

The parish of Hungarton covers over 4,000 acres (16 km^{2}) and includes with the village the estates of Quenby Hall, Baggrave and Ingarsby.

A bill to enclose common lands in the village was introduced in 1762.

The village layout follows the model village built in 1764–1776 by Shukburgh Ashby, then owner of nearby Quenby Hall. There are a few cottages that pre-date this and several houses built since.

John Marius Wilson: Imperial Gazetteer of England and Wales (1870–72):

"HUNGERTON, a village, a township, and a parish in Billesdon district, Leicestershire. The village stands between the two branches of the river Wreak, 6 miles SE by E of Syston Junction r. station, and 7 NE by E of Leicester; and has a post office under Leicester. The township includes the village. Real property, £1,565. Pop., 196. Houses, 48. The parish contains also the liberty of Baggrave, and the hamlets of Ingarsby and Quenby. Acres, 2,910. Real property, £5,945. Pop., 302. Houses, 64. The property is divided among a few. Baggrave Hall is the seat of E. A. Burnaby, Esq. Quenby Hall has, for upwards of seven centuries, belonged to the Ashbys. Ingarsby Hall, an old moated building, is now a farmhouse. The living is a vicarage, united with the vicarage of Twyford and the p. curacy of Thorpe-Satchville, in the diocese of Peterborough. Value, £320. Patron, the Rev. E. Q. Ashby. The church is ancient; was restored in 1851; and consists of nave, chancel, and S aisle, with porch and lofty spire. There are a Wesleyan chapel and some charities."

Samuel Lewis, editor: A Topographical Dictionary of England (1848):

"HUNGERTON (St. John the Baptist), a parish, in the union of Billesdon, chiefly in the hundred of Gartree, S. division, but partly in that of East Goscote, N. division, of the county of Leicester, 7 miles (E. by N.) from Leicester; comprising the liberty of Baggrave, and the hamlets of Ingarsby and Quenby; and containing 267 inhabitants. The living is a discharged vicarage, with that of Twyford and the chapelry of Thorp-Satchville united in 1732, valued in the king's books at £9. 8. 1½., and in the alternate patronage of the families of Peacocke and Ashby; net income, £220."

== Notable people ==
In birth order

- George Ashby (1656–1728), politician, was born at Quenby Hall and buried at Hungarton.
- Shukburgh Ashby (1724–1792), landowner and politician, was buried at Hungarton.
- Andrew Burnaby (1732–1812), travel writer and cleric, was buried at Hungarton.
- Louisa Cavendish-Bentinck (née Burnaby, c. 1831–1918), a great-grandmother of Queen Elizabeth II, was baptised at Hungarton.
- Algernon Edwyn Burnaby (1868–1938) of Baggrave Hall, was Master of the Quorn Hunt.
