= Skeffington baronets of Skeffington (1786) =

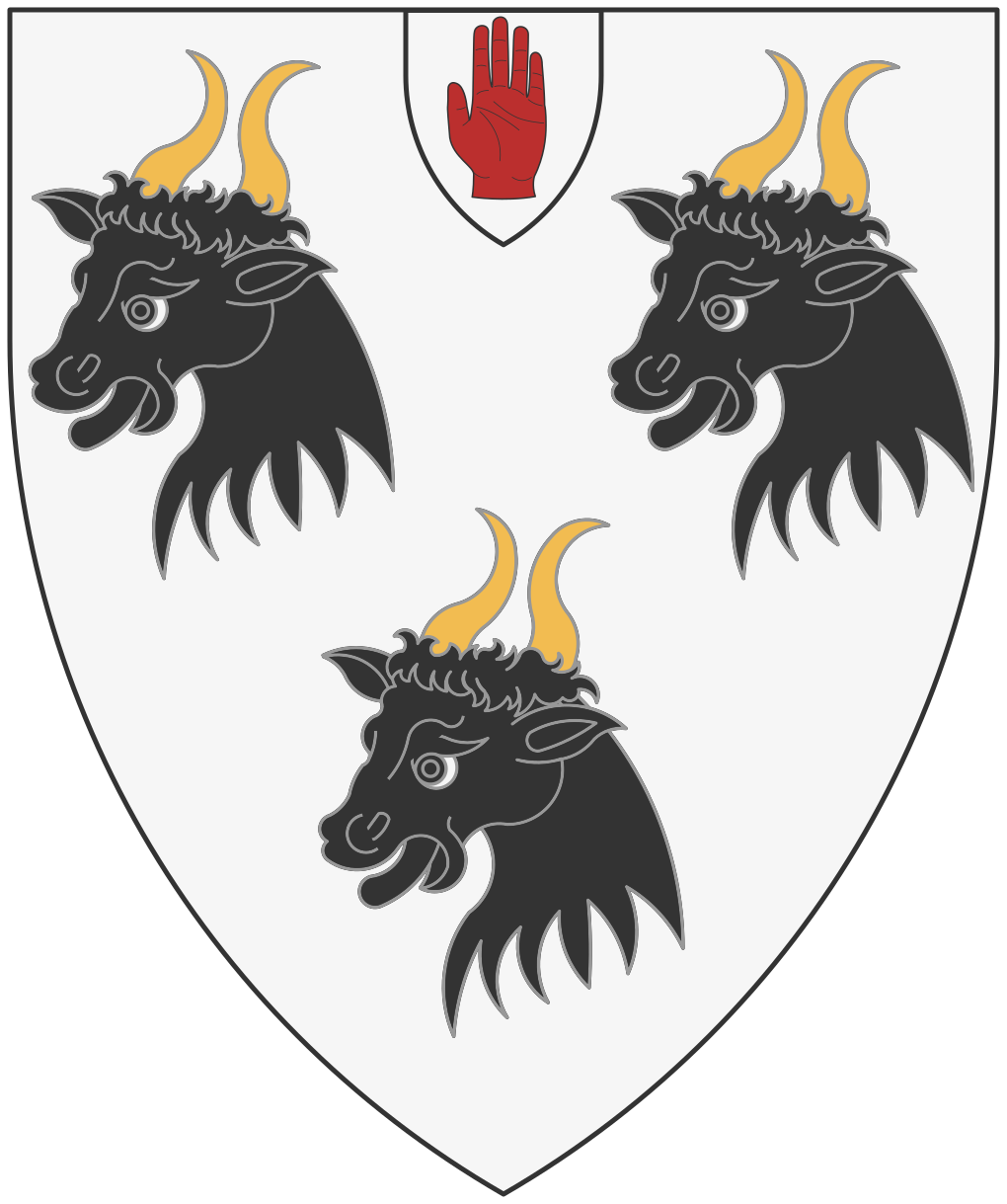
Escutcheon of the Skeffingtons of Skeffington

The Farrell-Skeffington, later Skeffington baronetcy, of Skeffington in the County of Leicester, was created in the Baronetage of Great Britain on 27 June 1786 for William Farrell-Skeffington of the 1st Foot Guards, Esquire to the Prince Frederick, Duke of York and Albany. His original surname was Farrell, but having taken Skeffington in addition in 1772, came to use it only.

The 2nd Baronet used the surname Skeffington only. The title became extinct on his death in 1850.

== Farrell-Skeffington, later Skeffington baronets, of Skeffington (1786) ==
- Sir William Charles Farrell-Skeffington, 1st Baronet (1742–1815)
- Sir Lumley St George Skeffington, 2nd Baronet (1771–1850)

== Notes ==
Baronetage of Great Britain
Preceded by Hunter-Blair baronets	Farrell-Skeffington baronets of Skeffington; 27 June 1786	Succeeded by Miller baronets
