= Chichester Skeffington, 4th Earl of Massereene =

Anglo-Irish politician and peer

Chichester Clotworthy Skeffington, 4th Earl of Massereene (1746–25 February 1816) was an Anglo-Irish politician and peer.

Massereene was the youngest son of Clotworthy Skeffington, 1st Earl of Massereene and Anne Eyre. He was educated at Trinity College Dublin.

He sat in Irish House of Commons as the Member of Parliament for Antrim between 1768 and 1797. He held the office of High Sheriff of Antrim in 1797. On 12 June 1811 he succeeded his brother as Earl of Massereene.

Massereene married Lady Harriet Jocelyn, daughter of Robert Jocelyn, 1st Earl of Roden and Lady Anne Hamilton, in 1780. They had one daughter, Harriet, who succeeded to her father's viscountcy on his death. The earldom, which could only pass down the male line, become extinct.

Parliament of Ireland
Preceded by Hugh Skeffington; William John Skeffington	Member of Parliament for Antrim; 1768–1797; With: William John Skeffington	Succeeded by Hon. Henry Skeffington; William John Skeffington
Peerage of Ireland
Preceded by Henry Skeffington	Earl of Massereene; 1811–1816	Extinct
Preceded by Henry Skeffington	Viscount Massereene; 1811–1816	Succeeded by Harriet Skeffington
