= William Farrell-Skeffington =

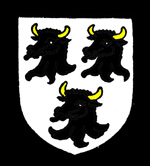
Skeffington family coat-of-arms

Sir William Charles Farrell-Skeffington, 1st Baronet, (24 June 1742 – 26 January 1815) was a British soldier.

Born William Charles Farrell in London, the eldest son of William Farrell of Skeffington Hall, he was appointed to an ensigncy in the 1st Foot Guards on 11 February 1761, and married Catherine Josepha Hubbard, eldest daughter of the merchant Michael Hubbard of Tenerife, on 9 December 1765. On 27 May 1768 he was appointed a lieutenant and captain in the 1st Guards, and on 11 June that year assumed the surname and arms of Skeffington by royal warrant, tracing his membership of that ancient Leicestershire family through his grandmother, Elizabeth Skeffington.

On 5 February 1772 he rose to the rank of captain and lieutenant-colonel, and last appeared in the Army List in 1778, presumably retiring thereafter. In 1786, he was appointed a baronet, and later became deputy lieutenant of Leicestershire. In 1794, he was appointed to the colonelcy of the Leicestershire Yeomanry, effective 9 May, and held the post until November 1803.

He had one surviving son, Lumley St. George Skeffington, who succeeded him in the baronetcy, but did not inherit his estate in Leicestershire; Skeffington Hall, its grounds, and the library were sold in July 1814, just before Sir William's death.

== Notes ==
Baronetage of Great Britain
New creation	Baronet (of Skeffington); 1786–1815	Succeeded by Lumley Skeffington
