= Keyham =

Keyham may refer to:

- Keyham, Plymouth, a suburb of Plymouth, in Devon, England
  - Keyham railway station
- Keyham, Leicestershire, a village and civil parish in Leicestershire, England
