= Quenby Hall =

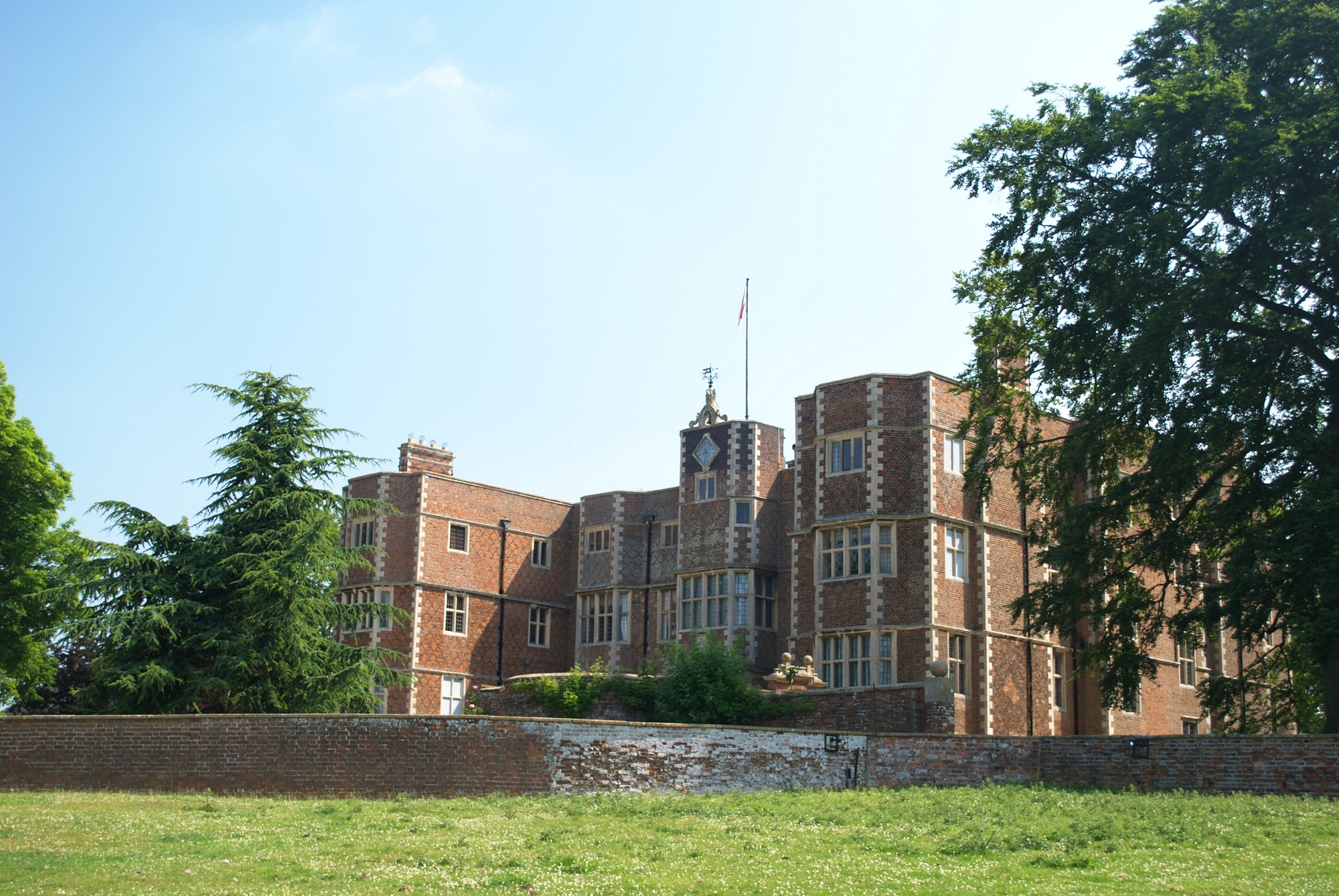
- The Hall from the south-west

- Location within Leicestershire

General information
- Type: Historic house
- Architectural style: Jacobean
- Location: Nr. Cold Newton and Hungarton, Leicestershire, England
- Coordinates: 52°39′4″N 0°57′50″W
- Completed: 1636

Design and construction
- Architect: George Ashby

Quenby Hall is a Jacobean house in parkland near the villages of Cold Newton and Hungarton, Leicestershire, England. It is described by Sir Nikolaus Pevsner as "the most important early-seventeenth century house in the county of Leicestershire". The Hall is Grade I listed, and the park and gardens Grade II, by English Heritage.

== Location ==
Quenby Hall is just south of Hungarton, about 7 miles (11.3 km) east of the centre of Leicester and is best reached from the A47 road by taking the turn towards Hungarton at the village of Billesdon.

== Descent of the manor ==
=== Ashby family ===
The Ashby family acquired an estate in Quenby in the 13th century. By 1563 they had acquired the whole Manor, and soon afterwards moved to enclose and depopulate it.

Quenby Hall was built between 1618 and 1636 by George Ashby (1598–1653), High Sheriff of Leicestershire for 1627. The village of Quenby was held by the Ashby family from the 13th century and remains of the village are in the present park. The village population was at least 25 in 1377 based on poll tax data. There may have been a house on the site before building of the current house which began in 1618. A clock on the west front is dated 1620. Building finished in 1636. The house is 'H-shaped' and on a hillside location. It has three storeys and a very shallow pitched roof.

George Ashby was succeeded by his son, also George, who married the daughter of Euseby Shuckburgh of Naseby, Northamptonshire. Their son George, MP for Leicestershire, was known as 'Honest George Ashby the Planter' because of the large number of trees he planted at Quenby. He died in 1728, and in the mid-18th century Quenby Hall passed to his great-nephew Shukburgh Ashby (died 1792), MP for Leicester and Fellow of the Royal Society. Quenby Hall remained in the Ashby family until 1904.

=== Mrs Greaves ===
The house was bought in 1904 and restored by Rosamund Greaves (née Lloyd), then remarried with Lord Henry Grosvenor, who restored much of the Jacobean interior. Her son sold Quenby Hall in 1924 to Sir Harold Nutting, "newly rich from bottling Guinness", who at the end of the decade commenced his notable mastership of the Quorn Hunt.

=== de Lisle ===
The de Lisles then bought Quenby Hall in 1972. They made extensive restorations at Quenby, which was eventually turned into a cheese-making business on the estate in 2005, in order to bypass planning regulations banning the family from inhabiting the home full time. The business failed in July 2011 with debts of £250,000 caused by over-expansion. The business had then a turnover of about £1.8m and employed about 40 staff. In April 2011 administrators were brought in to find a buyer but none was forthcoming, perhaps due to problems with the export market caused by a recent incident of listeria in the Quenby product. In late 2013 the family put up Quenby Hall for sale for £11.6 million.

== Stilton cheese ==
After a break of 250 years, production began again in 2005 but the business ended in 2011.

== Film location ==
Part of the British film A Cock and Bull Story (2006) was made at the Hall.
