= Keyham, Leicestershire =

Village in Leicestershire, England

Coordinates: 52.65255°N 1.01216°W

Keyham
- Location within Leicestershire
- Population: 118 (2001 census)
- OS grid reference: SK6606
- Civil parish: Keyham
- District: Harborough
- Shire county: Leicestershire
- Region: East Midlands
- Country: England
- Sovereign state: United Kingdom
- Post town: LEICESTER
- Postcode district: LE7
- Dialling code: 0116
- Police: Leicestershire
- Fire: Leicestershire
- Ambulance: East Midlands
- UK Parliament: Melton and Syston

Keyham is an English village in Leicestershire. It lies about 7 miles (11 km) east of Leicester, in the district of Harborough. The population at the 2001 census was 118, which rose to 124 at the 2011 census.

== Heritage ==
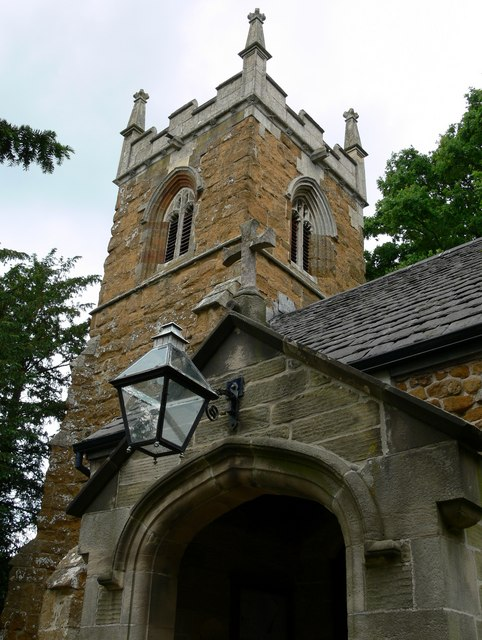
All Saints' Church, Keyham

Mention of Keyham can be found as early as the 11th century.

The Anglican Parish Church of All Saints is a Grade II* listed building. Its nave and chancel were probably built in the 13th and 14th centuries and the tower added in the 15th. The church was restored in the 19th century. The tower has a fleuron frieze below its battlements.

Keyham Old Hall is one of eleven Grade II listed buildings in the village. It was built in red brick with stone dressings and dates from the late 16th to 17th centuries, but it was much altered and enlarged in the 19th century.

Keyham had a board school from 1885 until 1939 with a single teacher. A history of the school by Michael Freeman is available online.

=== 1964 air accident ===
English Electric Lightning 'XN723', owned by Rolls-Royce, crashed from RAF Hucknall on 25 March 1964. 31 year old Denis Whitham, of 41 Holly Road, Watnall, ejected at 5,000 ft. He landed near Houghton on the Hill, and walked to Uppingham Road, the A47, and knocked on the door of the local policeman, Mr Tomlinson. The policeman's wife phoned an ambulance, and made the pilot a cup of tea. He was taken to Leicester Royal Infirmary.

Fire engines came from Leicester, Billesdon and Syston. The ejector seat landed in the Thurnby Lodge Estate, in Scraptoft. Two other RAF aircraft crashed that day, including a helicopter crash at RAF Tern Hill that killed both pilots.

== Social amenities ==
The village includes a village hall and a public house, the Dog and Gun. There is a camp and caravan site at Long Meadow Farm, and a kennels and cattery in Snows Lane.

The Anglican All Saints' Church forms part of a group benefice with Hungarton, Billesdon, Goadby and Skeffington. A service is held there about once a month.

The village has no public transport. The nearest railway station is at Leicester (4½ miles, 7 km).
