= John Whyte-Melville-Skeffington, 13th Viscount Massereene =

Royal Navy officer and peer

John Clotworthy Talbot Foster Whyte-Melville-Skeffington, 13th Viscount Massereene and 6th Viscount Ferrard DL (22 October 1914 – 27 December 1992), was a British politician and landowner. He was also Baron Loughneagh (1660, Ireland), 6th Baron Oriel (1790, Ireland), and 6th Baron Oriel (1821, UK), and served as a Deputy Lieutenant for County Antrim. Lord Massereene and Ferrard succeeded his father in 1956 and regularly attended the House of Lords.

== Early years ==
Educated at Eton College, in 1939 Whyte-Melville-Skeffington married Annabelle Kathleen, daughter of the late Henry D. Lewis, of Combwell Priory, Kent. They had one son, the future 14th Viscount, and one daughter.

He was a lieutenant in the Black Watch regiment 1933–36, and again in 1939, invalided out in 1940 due to wounds received in action. He served in the Small Vessels Pool, Royal Navy, in 1944. He was Gold Staff Officer at the Coronation of Queen Elizabeth II in 1953.

== Political activities ==
Viscount Massereene and Ferrard was president of Brighton Kemptown Conservative Association, and vice-president and treasurer of the Ashford, Kent, Conservative Division. He was a member of the Inter-Parliamentary Union Delegation to Spain in 1960, and commodore of the House of Lords Yacht Club, 1972 – 1985. He was joint deputy chairman (1965–1970) and whip of the Conservative Peers Committee (IUP) in the House of Lords 1965–1970.

Lord Masserene and Ferrard was responsible for introducing to Parliament the Deer Act in 1963, the Export of Animals for Research Bill 1968, the Riding Establishments Act 1970, the Valerie Mary Hill and Alan Monk (Marriage Enabling) Bill 1984, and moved debates on Overseas Information Services and other matters. He was Commissioner to the Hunterston Ore Terminal Hearing, Glasgow, 1973. In 1976, he was on the parliamentary delegation to Malawi, and the same year served on the Parliamentary Select committee on the Anglian Water Authority Bill.

He was for over twenty years an active member of the Conservative Monday Club. In 1981, he succeeded the 6th Marquess of Salisbury as Club President, a post he held until January 1991, when he stood down.

== Business and other activities ==
Lord Massereene and Ferrard was the driver of the leading British car in the Le Mans Grand Prix D'endurance in 1937, and promoted the first scheduled air service between Glasgow-Oban-Isle of Mull, 1968. He was a Freeman of the City of London, and a liveryman of the Shipwrights' Company. He was one of the original pioneers in the commercial development of Cape Canaveral, and a director of numerous companies.

He was for some time a member of the Senechal Council of Canterbury Cathedral, a member of the Royal Yacht Squadron, and a vice-president of the Kent branch of the Royal British Legion. He was also chairman of the Victoria League, Kent.

He also undertook a brief motor racing career in the 1930s, the highlight of which was a 5th place finish in the 1937 24 Hours of Le Mans (and winning the 1.5 litre class), in an Aston Martin Ulster which had won the Coupe Biennale in 1935. The car was fettled by Robert Murton-Neale, a director of Speed Models Ltd of London, who was also Skeffington's co-driver.

== Estates ==
A very extensive landowner, his English seat was at Chilham Castle in Kent. The Norman Keep of the Castle, which is the oldest building in the village and still inhabited, dates from 1174 and was said to have been built for King Henry II. But archaeological excavations carried out in the 1920s suggest that it stands on the foundations of a much older Anglo-Saxon fortification, possibly dating from the 5th century, and there is evidence of earlier Roman habitation in the vicinity.

The Jacobean building, now known as the Castle, was constructed in 1616 for Sir Dudley Digges, reputedly to a design by Inigo Jones. It is one of the finer mansions in the south-east and commands exceptional views across the valley of the River Stour, Kent. The gardens, originally laid out by John Tradescant the elder, were redesigned in the 18th century under the guidance of Capability Brown and include a fine terrace leading down to a fishing lake. The walls to the grounds also date from this time (1720), although the two gatehouses were only added in the 1920s. He also owned the Knock Estate on the Isle of Mull, as well as estates in Ireland, notably owning Antrim Castle near the Six Mile Water in County Antrim in the east of Ulster. Antrim Castle was set alight in 1922, either in a night time raid by the Irish Republican Army (IRA), which was never conclusively proved, or a defect in the heating system or a faulty flue, and destroyed. Massereene was in the castle with his parents at the time. What remained of the ruins of Antrim Castle were demolished in 1970. All that remains is an octagonal tower.

== Publications ==
- Massereene & Ferrard, The Viscount, The Lords – The History of the House of Lords and its function and role in the 20th century, (Foreword by The Lord Chancellor, The Baron Hailsham of St Marylebone), London, 1973, ISBN 0-85632-018-8 .

Peerage of Ireland
Preceded by Algernon Skeffington	Viscount Massereene; Viscount Ferrard; 1956–1992	Succeeded by John Skeffington
