= Tugby and Keythorpe =

Civil parish in Leicestershire, England

Coordinates: 52.60315°N 0.86672°W

Tugby
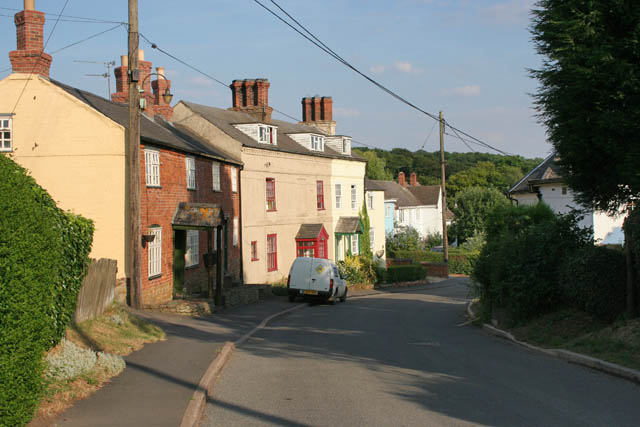
- Hallaton Road, Tugby

- Location within Leicestershire
- Population: 330 (2011 Census)
- OS grid reference: SK768011
- Civil parish: Tugby and Keythorpe
- District: Harborough
- Shire county: Leicestershire
- Region: East Midlands
- Country: England
- Sovereign state: United Kingdom
- Post town: LEICESTER
- Postcode district: LE7
- Dialling code: 0116
- Police: Leicestershire
- Fire: Leicestershire
- Ambulance: East Midlands
- UK Parliament: Harborough, Oadby and Wigston

Tugby and Keythorpe is a civil parish comprising the village of Tugby and land surrounding Keythorpe Hall, Hall Farm and Lodge Farm in the Harborough district of Leicestershire, England. The parish covers around 2,200 acres, situated 7 miles west of Uppingham, and 12 miles east of Leicester. According to the 2011 census the population of the parish was 330. The Anglican parish register for the parish dates back to 1568. The boundaries of the parish have not changed since its establishment, meaning that the parish's size remains the same as it did in 1568.

In the 1887 Gazetter of the British Isles it is suggested that the town dates back to Norman rule stating:

"The church has a Norman tower, and is good."

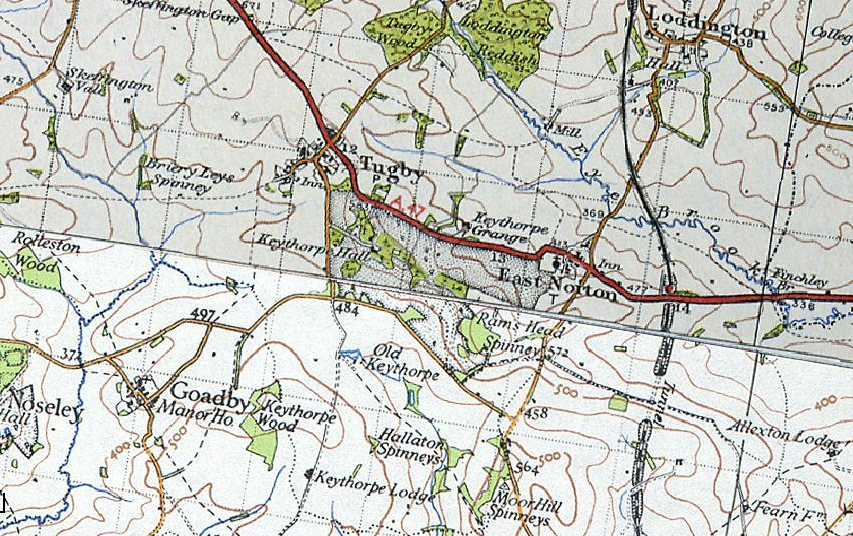
Tugby and Keythorpe ordnance survey, 20th century

== Demographics ==
=== Population overview ===
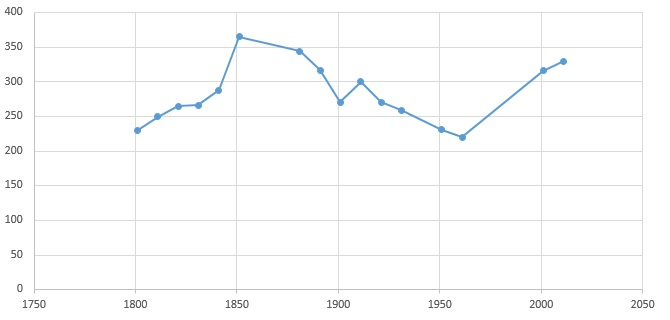
Total population of Tugby and Keythorpe Civil Parish, Leicestershire, as reported by the Census of Population from 1881 to 2011

Over the years the population has been an ever changing demographic, with there being distinct peaks and troughs. In the 1801 census population sat at 230 people, which then grew, reaching the parish's peak population of 365 in 1851. Population rapidly declined after reaching a record low of 220 in 1961. Population then began to increase over time, growing to 330 in 2011.

According to the 2011 census data, around 31% of the population was aged 35 to 54, and only 9% of the population aged 16–24. 98% of the population were White British, with only four people in the parish identifying as another ethnic group. However, 10 people were born outside of the UK. 72% of the parish's population identify as Christian, 26% identify as having no religion, or religion not stated, and only 0.9% identify as part of another religious community.

=== Occupation ===
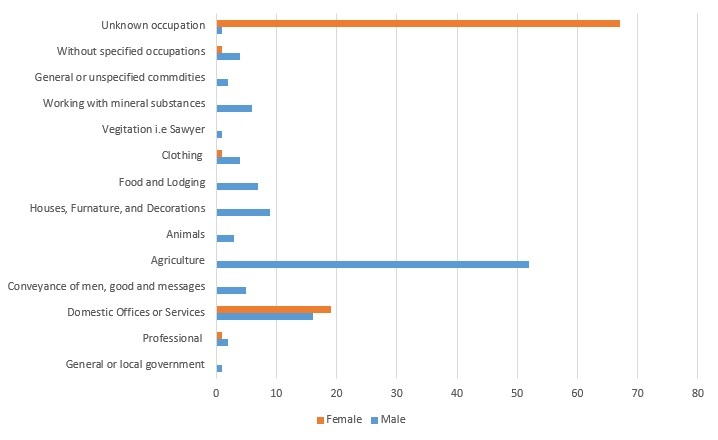
Occupational data from Tugby's 1801 census data

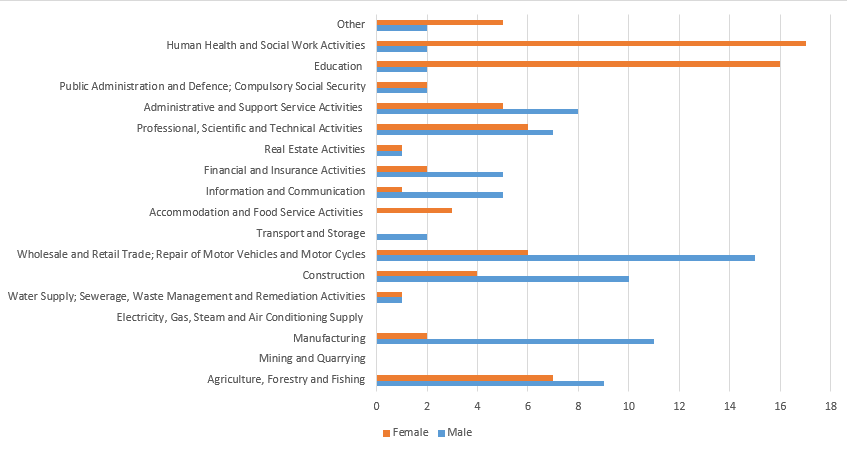
Occupational data from Tugby's 2011 census data

When studying the occupational fields of the 1881 census one can see a clear difference between the jobs of men and women. Many of the women's occupations, 59.63% of the overall female population, is unknown, which would suggest that they were unemployed, most likely staying at home. The most common occupation type of employment for women was domestic services, at 16.91% of the female population, likely due to the presence of Keythorpe manor. The men at the time tended to pursue more manual labor jobs, mainly agriculture based, with 61.36% of the total male population working in agriculture.

When looking at 2011 census data one can see that the divide between male and female employment has reduced, with only 4 women in the village not having a specific occupation. The most popular occupation for women to have in the village is human health and social work activities, at around 21.8%, and education at around 20.5% of the overall female population of the village. As for the males the type of work has diversified quite significantly, with a drop in agricultural work, with only 9 men working in this sector, unlike in 1881, when 52 worked in this sector. Although the majority of the male population work in wholesale and retail trade (18.3% of the population), there has been an increase in other occupations.

=== Health ===
Overall health in the village is good with the results of the 2011 census data showing that 46.6% of Tugby’s population were in 'very good health'. No one was in very bad health, with only 1.5% of the population in bad health. 87.9% of the population stated that their health did not limit their daily life.

=== Housing ===
The typical housing types in Tugby and Keythorpe are terraced, flats, semi-detached, and detached. House prices vary in value, some being of low value whilst others are very high. There is also a range of owner-occupied, social housing, and private rental homes, to match the needs of the community, with a NRS social grade of ABC1C2D.

== Notable places ==
=== Church of St Thomas Becket ===
Tugby and Keythorpe is home to nine Grade II listed buildings, one of which is Church of St Thomas Becket, the parish's church, dedicated to St Thomas Becket. It is able to seat 300. The St Thomas Beckett parish church was awarded £10,700 by the Heritage Lottery Fund to invest in a project to help protect and conserve its tower. This work is planned take place over two years, hoping to prevent the deterioration of the tower which can be dated to Anglo Saxon and Norman construction.

=== Tugby C of E Primary school ===
Tugby C of E primary school, situated on Main Street, is the parish's only primary school. It has a very large catchment area in order to provide for the local rural community, including the villages Tilton on the Hill and Skeffington.

=== Keythorpe Hall ===
Keythorpe Hall and Keythorpe 'Manor' are two completely separate properties a little distance apart.

Keythorpe Hall was relocated stone by stone from an ancient site near Keythorpe Lakes Farm, to a more prominent position sometime in the early 1800s and became the principal seat of the 11th Lord Berners, Henry William Wilson.

Keythorpe 'Manor', now a wedding venue, is in the Parish of East Norton and was originally called Norton Grange. Sometime in the late 1800s / early 1900s it became Keythorpe Grange but was recently renamed when it became a wedding venue. Keythorpe Grange was also owned by members of the Berners Barony, specifically Sir Raymond Robert Tyrwhitt-Wilson, as of 1912. In more recent years it sold in 2011 for £1,837,500.
