= Church of St John the Baptist, Billesdon =

Church in Billesdon, Leicestershire

Coordinates: 52°36′57″N 0°56′17″W

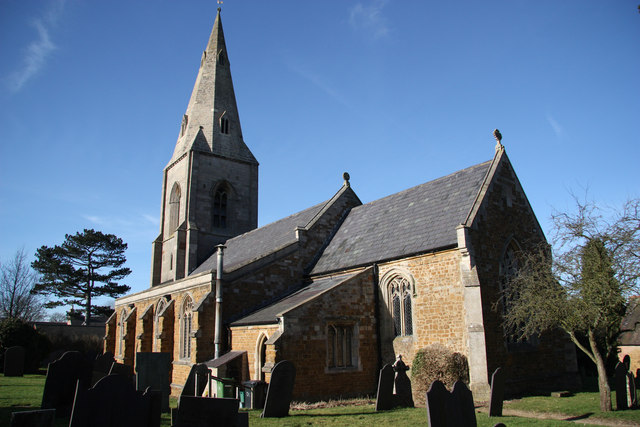
- Church of St John the Baptist, Billesdon
- Denomination: Church of England

History
- Dedication: St John the Baptist

Administration
- Diocese: Leicester
- Archdeaconry: Leicester
- Parish: Billesdon, Leicestershire

Clergy
- Rector: Alison Booker

The Church of St John the Baptist is a church in Billesdon, Leicestershire. It is a Grade II* listed building.

== History ==
The church is made up of a nave, tower, chancel and north and south aisles. The north arcade dates from the 13th century and has octagonal piers. The tower was also added in the 13th century and has a spire, 2 bell openings and lucarnes. It was rebuilt in 1862 by Kirk & Parry, who later added the current south aisle and restored the church in 1864–65. The font dates from the late 12th to early 13th century.
