= Algernon Skeffington, 12th Viscount Massereene =

British Army officer and Ulster Unionist politician (1873–1956)

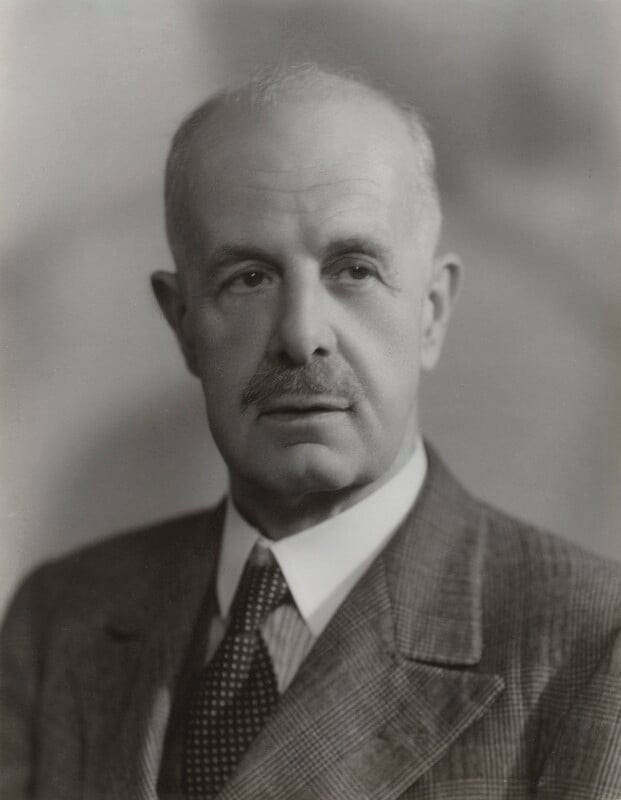
Massereene in 1940

Algernon William John Clotworthy Skeffington, 12th Viscount Massereene and 5th Viscount Ferrard, DSO (28 November 1873 – 20 July 1956) was a British Army officer and an Ulster Unionist member of the Senate of Northern Ireland from 1921 to 1929. During this period he served as Deputy Leader of the Senate and Parliamentary Secretary in the Department of the Prime Minister.

== Early life ==
Skeffington was the eldest son of Clotworthy John Skeffington, 11th Viscount Massereene by Florence Whyte-Melville, only daughter of Major George Whyte-Melville. He succeeded his father as 12th Viscount Massereene and 5th Viscount Ferrard in 1905, both in the Peerage of Ireland; his inheritance included about 16,000 acres. They also held the title Baron Oriel, in the Peerage of the United Kingdom, which gave them the right to sit in the House of Lords

== Career ==
He entered the army in February 1895, when he was commissioned a second lieutenant in the 17th Lancers, and was promoted to lieutenant on 13 November 1895. The regiment was stationed in Ireland from 1897 until 1900. Promotion to captain followed on 8 February 1900. From 1900 to 1902 he served with his regiment in South Africa during the Second Boer War, where he was wounded, twice mentioned in despatches (including the final despatch by Lord Kitchener dated 23 June 1902), and for which he was promoted a brevet major on 22 August 1902, and created a Companion of the Distinguished Service Order (DSO). He stayed in South Africa throughout the war, which ended June 1902 with the Peace of Vereeniging. Four months later he left Cape Town with other officers and men of the 17th Lancers on the SS German in late September 1902, and arrived at Southampton in late October, when they were posted to Edinburgh. He retired from the army in 1907, but served again as an officer with the North Irish Horse in World War I 1914–18.

Lord Massereene was Parliamentary Secretary in the Department of the Prime Minister of Northern Ireland 1921–1929.

He also served as Lord Lieutenant and Custos Rotulorum of County Antrim 1916–1938.

== Personal life ==
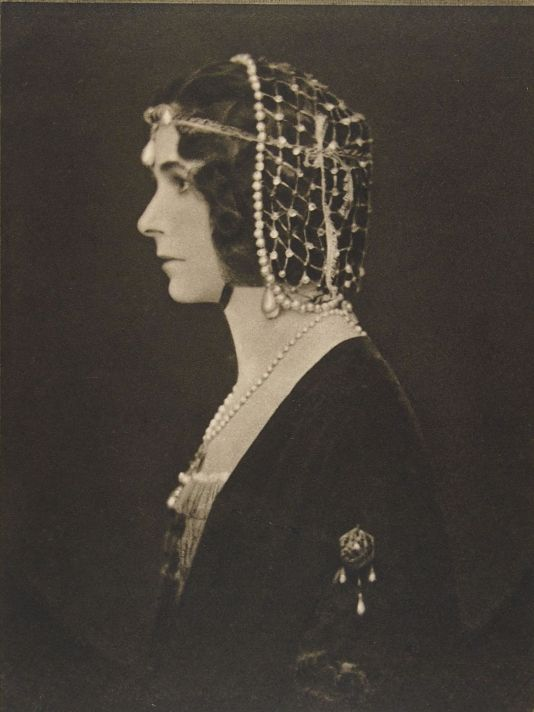
His first wife, the former Jean Barbara Ainsworth

Lord Massereene married twice.

In 1905 he married Jean Barbara Ainsworth (d 1937), eldest daughter of Sir John Ainsworth, 1st Baronet. They had two children:

- John Whyte-Melville-Skeffington, who succeeded as 13th Viscount.
- Diana Skeffington, d.1930.

In 1922, the family was living in the ancestral home, Antrim Castle, when it was set on fire by the IRA. They then moved to Clotworthy House. Lady Massereene was active in charitable causes, serving as president of the Women's National Health Association, and was also interested in spiritualism. She died in 1937.

In 1940 the Viscount remarried Mrs Florence Clementina Vere Vere-Laurie.

Political offices
New parliament	Deputy Leader of the Senate of Northern Ireland; 1921–1929	Succeeded by 6th Viscount Bangor
New office	Parliamentary Secretary; Department of the Prime Minister (Northern Ireland); 1921–1929	Succeeded by 6th Viscount Bangor
Peerage of Ireland
Preceded by Clotworthy Skeffington	Viscount Massereene; 1905–1956	Succeeded by John Whyte-Melville-Skeffington
Preceded by Clotworthy Skeffington	Viscount Ferrard; 1905–1956	Succeeded by John Whyte-Melville-Skeffington
