= Shukburgh Ashby =

British landowner and politician

Shukburgh or Shuckburgh Ashby (6 October 1724 – 28 January 1792) was a British landowner and politician.

== Life ==
Ashby was the eldest son of Shukburgh Ashby, Leicestershire and was educated at Balliol College, Oxford. He inherited the Quenby estate from his great-uncle in 1728.

He was elected a Fellow of the Royal Society in 1756.

He was appointed High Sheriff of Leicestershire for 1758–59 and became Member of Parliament for Leicester at a by-election in February 1784 following the death of the sitting MP John Darker. He declined to stand for re-election in the General Election later that year.

He married Elizabeth, the daughter and heiress of Richard Hinde of Cold Ashby, Northamptonshire, with whom he had two daughters.

He is buried in St John the Baptist churchyard, Hungarton, Leicestershire with a monument by Thomas Banks.
