= Antrim (Parliament of Ireland constituency) =

Pre-1801 Irish constituency

Antrim Borough
- Former borough constituency for the Irish House of Commons
- County: County Antrim
- Borough: Antrim

1666–1801
- Seats: 2
- Replaced by: Disfranchised

Antrim was a borough constituency which elected two MPs to the Irish House of Commons, the house of representatives of the Kingdom of Ireland.

== History ==
The borough of Antrim in County Antrim was enfranchised as a borough constituency in 1666. In the Patriot Parliament of 1689 summoned by King James II, Antrim was not represented. Thereafter it continued to be entitled to send two Members of Parliament to the Irish House of Commons until the Parliament of Ireland was merged into the Parliament of the United Kingdom on 1 January 1801. The constituency was disenfranchised on 31 December 1800 by the Acts of Union 1800.

The borough was represented in the House of Commons of the United Kingdom as part of the county constituency of Antrim.

== Electoral System and Electorate ==
The parliamentary representatives for all constituencies in the Irish House of Commons were elected using the bloc vote for two-member elections and first past the post for single-member by-elections.

The borough had a Potwalloper electorate.

== Members of Parliament, 1666–1801 ==
Election	First member	First party	Second member	Second party
1666	John Jeffreys		William Domville, Junior	
1689	Antrim Borough was not represented in the Patriot Parliament			
1692	Sir Robert Adare		Arthur Upton	
1695	Thomas Brooke		Thomas Dawson	
1696	Robert Dalway		Thomas Dawson	
1703	Hugh Montgomery		Thomas Bell	
1713	Thomas Upton		Hugh Henry	
1715	John William MacMullan		Hugh Henry	
1717	John Skeffington		Hugh Henry	
1727	Robert Colvill		Hugh Henry	
1744	Robert Colvill		James Smyth	
1749	Hungerford Skeffington		James Smyth	
1768	Hungerford Skeffington		William John Skeffington	
1769	Hugh Skeffington		William John Skeffington	
1776	Hon. Chichester Skeffington		William John Skeffington	
1798	Hon. Henry Skeffington		William John Skeffington	
1801	Disenfranchised			

== Bibliography ==
- O'Hart, John (2007). The Irish and Anglo-Irish Landed Gentry: When Cromwell came to Ireland. Vol. II. Heritage Books. ISBN 978-0-7884-1927-0.
- Leigh Rayment's historical List of Members of the Irish House of Commons. Cites: Johnston-Liik, Edith Mary (2002). The History of the Irish Parliament 1692-1800 (6 volumes). Ulster Historical Foundation.
