= Skivington =

Skivington is a surname. Notable people with the surname include:

- George Skivington (born 1982), English rugby union player
- Karl Skivington, member of the band Spotlight Kid
- Mike Skivington (1921–2012), Scottish footballer

== See also ==
- George v Skivington (1869), a leading case in English consumer law
- Skeffington
