= Statue of Queen Elizabeth II and Prince Philip, Duke of Edinburgh, Antrim =

Coordinates: 54.717316°N 6.224590°W

A statue of Queen Elizabeth II and Prince Philip, Duke of Edinburgh was unveiled in the gardens of Antrim Castle in September 2024. It was sculpted by Anto Brennan.

It is sculpted in bronze and depicts Queen Elizabeth II with her consort, Prince Philip, Duke of Edinburgh, and two of their Welsh Corgi dogs. The Queen's relationship with corgis was renowned.

The statue was proposed in January 2023. It was unveiled on 6 September 2024 in a ceremony attended by David McCorkell, Lord Lieutenant of Antrim, and Paul Dunlop, the Deputy Mayor of Antrim and Newtownabbey. Antrim and Newtownabbey Borough Council wrote that the statue "captures Her Majesty in a dignified pose, reflecting her grace, steadfastness and lifelong dedication to public service".

Since its unveiling, the statue has been critically poorly received and has attracted disparaging remarks regarding the likeness of the two figures to their subjects.
