= Henry Skeffington, 3rd Earl of Massereene =

Henry Skeffington, 3rd Earl of Massereene (1744–2 June 1811) was an Anglo-Irish British Army officer, politician and peer.

Massereene was the second son of Clotworthy Skeffington, 1st Earl of Massereene and Anne Eyre. He was educated at Harrow School and Trinity College Dublin.

He sat in Irish House of Commons as the Member of Parliament for Belfast between 1768 and 1797. He then represented Antrim from 1779 until the constituency disenfranchisement under the Acts of Union 1800.

Massereene gained the rank of lieutenant-colonel in the 2nd Regiment of Horse. He was Governor of Cork between 1792 and 1811.

He succeeded his brother, Clotworthy, as Earl of Massereene on 28 February 1805. Massereene never married and was succeeded in his title by his younger brother, Chichester.

Parliament of Ireland
Preceded by John Chichester; John Ludford	Member of Parliament for Belfast; 1768–1797; With: George Hamilton (1768–1776); Barry Yelverton (1776–1777); Alexander Crookshank (1777–1784); Joseph Hewitt (1784–1792); Sir William Godfrey, Bt (1792–1797)	Succeeded by Lord Spencer Stanley Chichester; George Crookshank
Preceded by Hon. Chichester Skeffington; William John Skeffington	Member of Parliament for Antrim; 1799–1800; With: William John Skeffington	Constituency disenfranchised
Peerage of Ireland
Preceded by Clotworthy Skeffington	Earl of Massereene; 1805–1811	Succeeded by Chichester Skeffington
