= Lumley Skeffington =

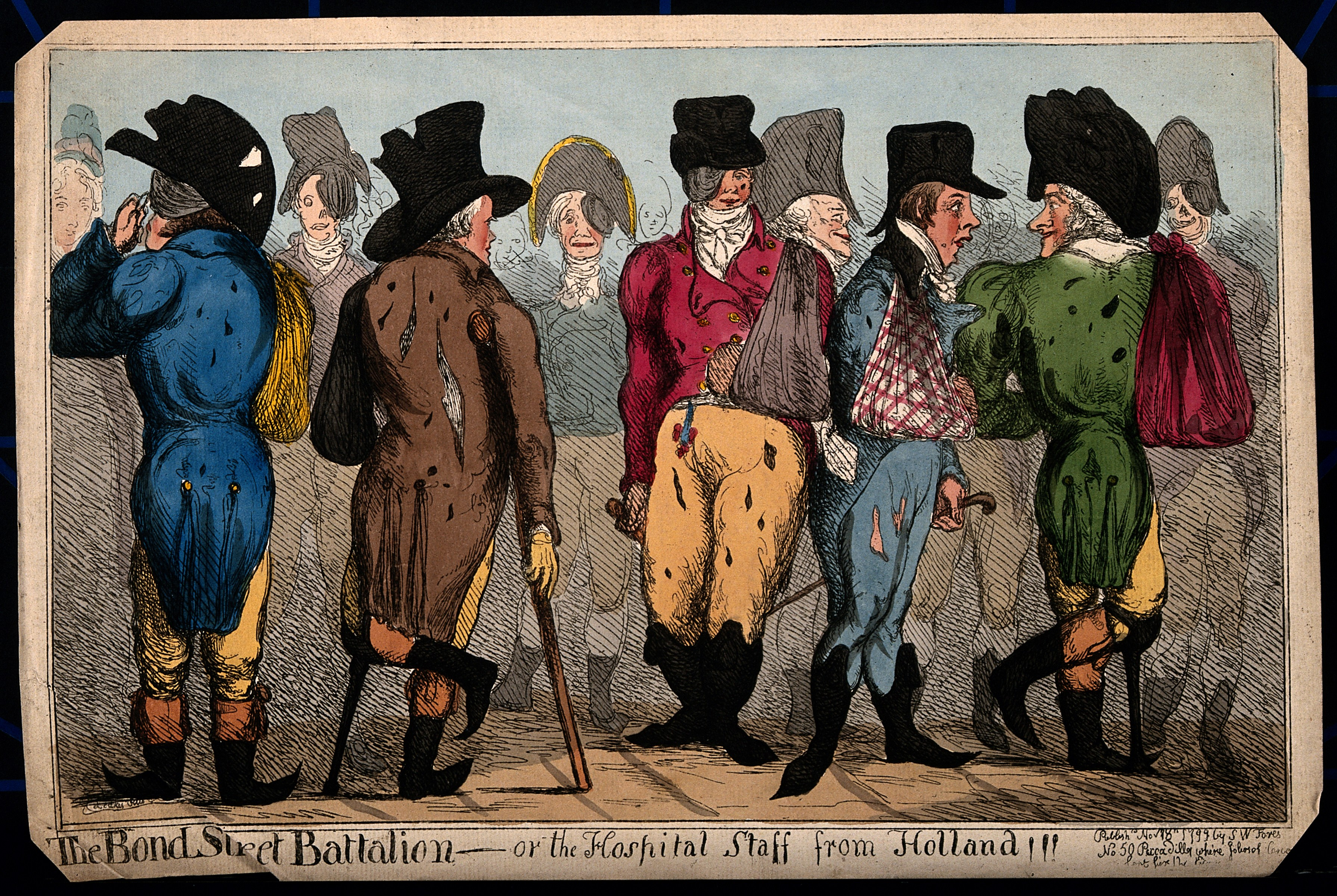
Group of fops including Sir Lumley feigning fashionable wounds

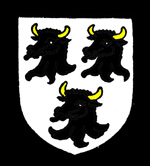
Skeffington family coat-of-arms

Sir Lumley St George Skeffington, 2nd Baronet (23 March 1771 – 10 November 1850) was a British nobleman, fop and playwright.

He attended Newcome's School in Hackney, where he acquired a taste for drama; in May 1802 he presented a five-act comedy at Covent Garden entitled The Word of Honour, followed the next season by another at Drury Lane entitled The High Road to Marriage; both were moderately successful, with his first major achievement being a "grand legendary melodrama", The Sleeping Beauty, presented at Drury Lane in May 1805.

Later plays included Maids and Bachelors (1806), The Mysterious Bride (1808), Bombastes Furioso (?), Ethelinde (an opera, circa 1810 at Drury Lane), and Lose No Time, a comedy. None are believed to have been printed, bar some portions of Sleeping Beauty.

He succeeded to the baronetcy on 26 January 1815, as the only surviving son of his father, William Charles Farrell-Skeffington, 1st Baronet of Skeffington Hall, Leicestershire (but did not inherit Skeffington Hall itself, which had been sold in 1814). However, he had never married, and the title became extinct on his death for lack of an heir.

He was a noted dandy and was consulted on dress and style by the Prince Regent. He invented the colour Skeffington brown. He was caricatured by Gillray and satirised by Byron and Moore.

Baronetage of Great Britain
Preceded by William Farrell-Skeffington	Baronet (of Skeffington); 1815–1850	Extinct
