= Hugh Montgomery, 4th Earl of Mount Alexander =

Hugh Montgomery, 4th Earl of Mount Alexander (c. 1680 – 27 February 1745), styled Viscount Montgomery between 1717 and 1731, was an Irish landowner and politician.

Montgomery was the son of Henry Montgomery, 3rd Earl of Mount Alexander, by the Honourable Mary St Lawrence, daughter of William St Lawrence, 12th Baron Howth. He was returned to the Irish House of Commons for Antrim in 1703, a seat he held until 1713. He entered the Irish House of Lords on the death of his father in 1731.

Lord Mount Alexander married Elinor Barnewall, daughter of Sir Patrick Barnewall, 3rd Baronet, of Crickstown, in 1703. He died in February 1745 and was succeeded in his titles by his younger brother, Thomas. The Countess of Mount Alexander died in December 1746.

Parliament of Ireland
Preceded by Thomas Dawson; Robert Dalway	Member of Parliament for Antrim; 1703–1713; With: Thomas Bell	Succeeded by Thomas Upton; Hugh Henry
Peerage of Ireland
Preceded by Henry Montgomery	Earl of Mount Alexander; 1731–1745	Succeeded by Thomas Montgomery
