= Miller baronets of Glenlee (1788) =

Escutcheon of the Miller baronets of Glenlee

The Miller baronetcy, of Glenlee in the Stewartry of Kirkcudbright, was created in the Baronetage of Great Britain on 3 March 1788 for Thomas Miller, Lord President of the Court of Session with the judicial title of Lord Glenlee.

The 2nd Baronet was a Lord of Session with the judicial title of Lord Glenlee and also represented Edinburgh in the House of Commons.

== Miller baronets, of Glenlee (1788) ==
- Sir Thomas Miller, 1st Baronet (1717–1789)
- Sir William Miller, 2nd Baronet (1755–1846)
  - Thomas Miller (died 1827), father of the 3rd Baronet.
- Sir William Miller, 3rd Baronet (1815–1861)
- Sir Thomas Macdonald Miller, 4th Baronet (1846–1875)
  - William Frederic Miller (1863–1868), eldest son.
- Sir William Frederick Miller, 5th Baronet (1868–1948)
  - Frederic William Joseph Macdonald Miller (1891–1914), eldest son, killed in action.
- Sir Alastair George Lionel Joseph Miller, 6th Baronet (1893–1964)
- Sir Frederick William Macdonald Miller, 7th Baronet (1920–1991), Chairman of Suffolk County Council 1988–9.
- Sir Stephen William Macdonald Miller, 8th Baronet (born 1953)

The heir apparent is James Stephen Macdonald Miller of Glenlee, the younger (born 1981).

== Notes ==
Baronetage of Great Britain
Preceded by Farrell-Skeffington baronets	Miller baronets of Glenlee; 3 March 1788	Succeeded by Laforey baronets
