= Clotworthy Skeffington, 4th Viscount Massereene =

Anglo-Irish politician and peer

Clotworthy Skeffington, 4th Viscount Massereene (died 11 February 1738) was an Anglo-Irish politician and peer.

== Biography ==
He was the son of Clotworthy Skeffington, 3rd Viscount Massereene and Rachel Hungerford. He served in the Irish House of Commons as the Member of Parliament for County Antrim between 1703 and 1714. In March 1714 he succeeded to his father's title and assumed his seat in the Irish House of Lords.

On 9 September 1713 he married Lady Catherine Chichester, daughter of Arthur Chichester, 3rd Earl of Donegall. Together they had seven children. He was succeeded in his title by his eldest son, Clotworthy Skeffington, who was made Earl of Massereene in 1756.

Parliament of Ireland
Preceded by Hugh Colvill; Arthur Upton	Member of Parliament for County Antrim; 1703–1714; With: Clotworthy Upton	Succeeded by John Skeffington; Clotworthy Upton
Peerage of Ireland
Preceded by Clotworthy Skeffington	Viscount Massereene; 1714–1738	Succeeded by Clotworthy Skeffington
