= William John Skeffington =

Irish politician

William John Skeffington (1747–1811) was an Irish politician.

Skeffington was a Member of Parliament representing Antrim in the Irish House of Commons from 1768 until the constituency's disenfranchisement under the Acts of Union 1800.

Parliament of Ireland
Preceded by Hungerford Skeffington; James Smyth	Antrim; 1768–1800; With: Hungerford Skeffington (1768–1769); Hugh Skeffington (1769–1776); Hon. Chichester Skeffington (1776–1798); Hon. Henry Skeffington (1798–1800)	Succeeded by Constituency disenfranchised
