= Clotworthy Soden =

18th-century Irish Anglican priest

Clotworthy Soden was an eighteenth-century Irish Anglican priest.

Soden was born in County Donegal and educated at Trinity College, Dublin. He was Rector of Maghera and the Archdeacon of Derry from 1786 until his resignation in 1795.
