= Anthony Skeffington =

English-born cleric and judge in Ireland

Anthony Skeffington (died after 1535) was an English-born cleric and judge in Ireland.

He was born in Skeffington, Leicestershire. He was a cousin (or possibly a brother) of Sir William Skeffington, who served as Lord Deputy of Ireland in 1529–1532 and 1534–35, and he probably came to Ireland in William's retinue. He was appointed Master of the Rolls in Ireland in 1530 and held that office (which at that time was mainly administrative rather than judicial in nature) until 1533, when he was replaced by John Alan, when the Earl of Kildare's faction briefly returned to power, displacing William Skeffington.

In 1535 he was appointed prebendary of Swords in St Patrick's Cathedral, Dublin. His clerical office was suppressed soon afterwards during the general abolition of Roman Catholic benefices at the Reformation. His date of death is not recorded.
