= John Skeffington, 2nd Viscount Massereene =

Anglo-Irish politician, official and peer

John Skeffington, 2nd Viscount Massereene (December 1632 – 21 June 1695) was an Anglo-Irish politician, official, and peer. He was one of the leading Presbyterians in Ireland during his lifetime.

== Early life and family ==
Skeffington was the son of Sir Richard Skeffington and Anne Newdigate, daughter of Sir John Newdigate. He was born in Lichfield, Staffordshire, and raised as an adherent of the Presbyterian Church. He was educated at Magdalene College, Cambridge, entering the university in 1649. His tutor there was Samuel Morland and his fellow-pupil was Samuel Pepys. In April 1652 he succeeded to the baronetcy of his cousin, Sir William Skeffington, 3rd Baronet. In 1654 he married Mary Clotworthy, the eldest daughter of John Clotworthy, 1st Viscount Massereene. They had two daughters and a son.

== Career ==
Skeffington was the Member of Parliament for Down, Antrim, and Armagh in the Third Protectorate Parliament in 1659. He was made the captain of a troop of militia in County Antrim in 1660. In 1661, he was elected as the Member of Parliament for County Antrim in the re-established Irish House of Commons. He vacated the seat in 1665 upon succeeding by special remainder to his father-in-law's viscountcy and estates in 1665, and assumed his seat in the Irish House of Lords. He was a justice of the peace in Antrim, but was removed from the commission in 1663 in the aftermath of Colonel Thomas Blood's foiled plot to install a Presbyterian administration in Ireland. Despite this, Skeffington was appointed Custos Rotulorum of Londonderry in 1666, a member of the Privy Council of Ireland in 1667 and Governor of Londonderry in 1678.

In 1680, Skeffington was appointed captain of Lough Neagh, in part owing to his expenditure in improving the fortifications at Antrim Castle. An enthusiastic persecutor of the Irish Roman Catholic clergy, he alleged in 1681 that many soldiers in the Irish Army were either Catholics or married to Catholics. In the aftermath of the Rye House Plot in 1683, Skeffington came under pressure from the Duke of Ormond to conform to the established Church of Ireland, but Skeffington refused. James II of England excluded Skeffington from the Irish Privy Council upon his accession in 1685.

Three days after the outbreak of the Williamite War in Ireland, on 15 March 1689 Skeffington fled his Antrim Castle home; the following day the castle was captured by Jacobite forces who looted £3,000 of the viscount's possessions. After time in Derry and Scotland, he was in London by September 1689 where he was where he was one of a committee chosen by Irish Protestant exiles to represent their concerns to the English Williamite government. He was attainted by James II's brief Patriot Parliament. Skeffington returned to Ireland following the war, where he died in 1695. He had been readmitted to the Irish Privy Council by William III of England in 1692. He was succeeded in his title by his son, Clotworthy Skeffington.

Parliament of Ireland
Preceded by John Clotworthy; Sir George Rawdon	Member of Parliament for County Antrim; 1661–1665; With: John Davys	Succeeded by Sir Toby Poyntz; Conway Hill
Peerage of Ireland
Preceded by John Clotworthy	Viscount Massereene; 1665–1695	Succeeded by Clotworthy Skeffington
Baronetage of England
Preceded by William Skeffington	Baronet (of Fisherwick); 1652–1695	Succeeded by Clotworthy Skeffington
