= Thomas Skeffington, 2nd Viscount Ferrard =

Irish politician

Thomas Henry Skeffington, 2nd Viscount Ferrard (January 1772 – 18 January 1843), styled The Honourable from 1790 until 1824, was an Irish peer and politician.

== Background ==
Born Thomas Henry Foster, he was the son of John Foster, 1st Baron Oriel, the last Speaker of the Irish House of Commons, and Margaretta Amelia Burgh, 1st Viscountess Ferrard.

== Political career ==
He entered the Irish House of Commons for Dunleer in 1793, representing it until the Act of Union in 1801. Ferrard sat as Member of Parliament in the British House of Commons for Drogheda between 1807 and 1812 and for County Louth between 1821 and 1824. In 1811 he was appointed High Sheriff of Louth and in 1818, appointed High Sheriff of Antrim. He succeeded his mother as second Viscount Ferrard in 1824. As this was an Irish peerage it disqualified him from sitting in the Commons for an Irish seat, but it did not entitle him to a seat in the House of Lords. In 1828 he succeeded his father in the barony of Oriel, which was in the Peerage of the United Kingdom, and was able to take a seat in the upper chamber of the British Parliament.

== Family ==
Lord Ferrard married Harriet Skeffington, suo jure 9th Viscountess Massereene, daughter of Chichester Skeffington, 4th Earl of Massereene and 8th Viscount Massereene. She died in 1831. Lord Ferrard died in January 1843 and was succeeded by his son, John, who had already succeeded his mother as tenth Viscount Massereene.

Parliament of Ireland
Preceded by Nicholas Coddington; Hon. John Foster	Member of Parliament for Dunleer; 1793 – 1801; With: Nicholas Coddington 1793–1798; Henry Coddington 1798–1800; Quintin Dick 1800–1801	Succeeded by Parliament of the United Kingdom
Parliament of the United Kingdom
Preceded by Henry Meade-Ogle	Member of Parliament for Drogheda; 1807 – 1812	Succeeded by Henry Meade-Ogle
Preceded by John Foster; John Jocelyn	Member of Parliament for County Louth; 1821 – 1824; With: John Jocelyn	Succeeded by John Jocelyn; John Leslie Foster
Peerage of the United Kingdom
Preceded by John Foster	Baron Oriel; 1828 – 1843	Succeeded by John Skeffington
Peerage of Ireland
Preceded by Margaretta Foster	Viscount Ferrard; 1824 – 1843	Succeeded by John Skeffington
