= Skeffington Hall =

House in Skeffington, Leicestershire, England

Coordinates: 52.616474°N 0.905745°W

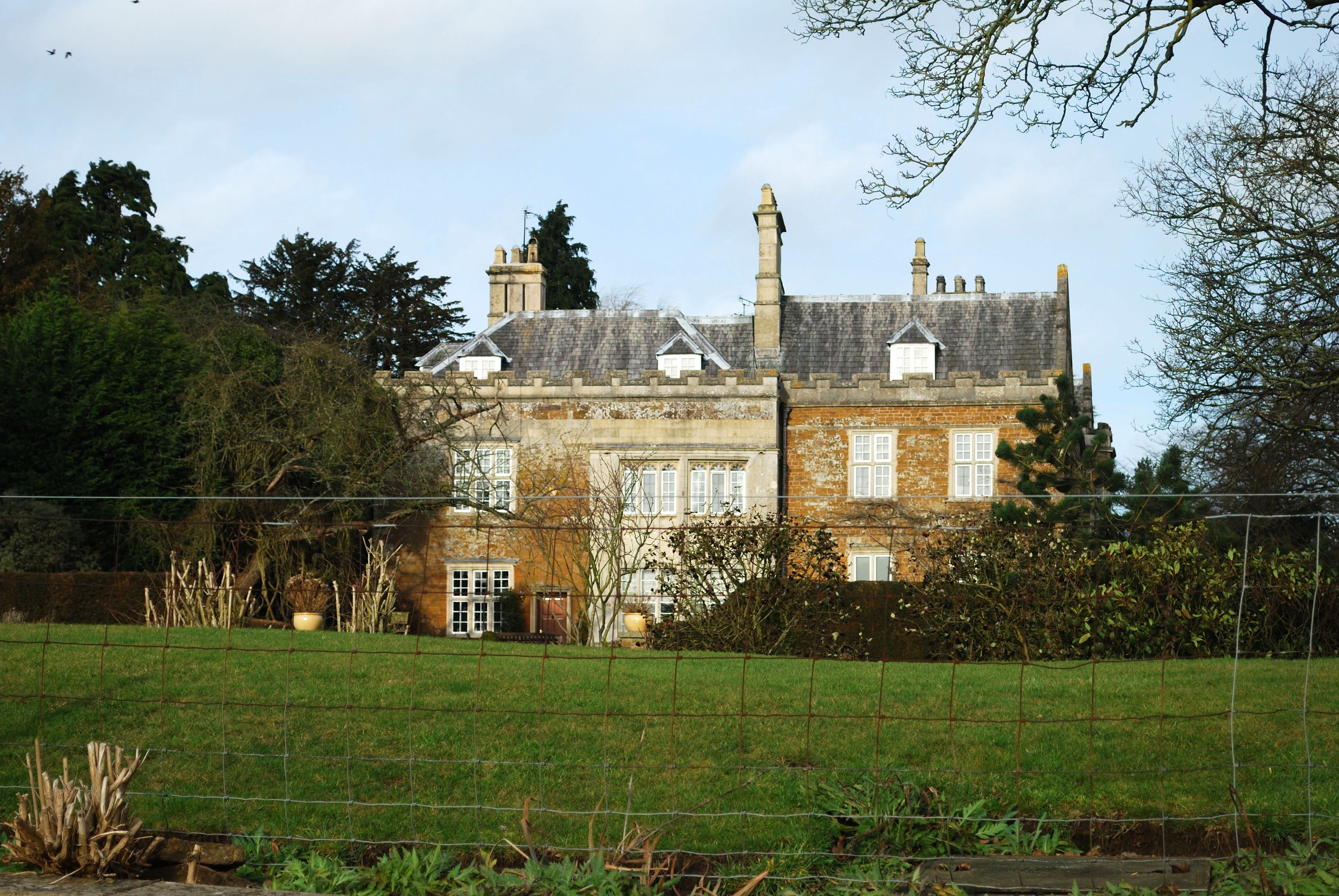
Skeffington Hall

Skeffington Hall is a 15th-century Manor House which stands in parkland off the main street of the village of Skeffington, Leicestershire, England. It is a Grade II* listed building and is privately owned.

The house was originally constructed in about 1450 and extended c1530 and again in the early or mid 17th century. It is built to an H-shaped plan in two storeys of coursed ironstone rubble with white limestone ashlar dressings and Swithland slate roofs. The main frontage, dating from the 17th century, has eight bays with a central projecting porch. A castellated parapet runs between projecting gables at each end.

In the 16th century the house was the birthplace of Thomas Skevington, Bishop of Bangor and Sir William Skeffington, Lord Deputy of Ireland. It was later owned by William Farrell, whose son Sir William Farrell-Skeffington, 1st Baronet, an officer in the British Army, adopted the Skeffington surname and sold the Hall to the Tailby family just before his death in 1815.

William Ward Tailby (1825-1914) was an avid huntsman and established his own pack of foxhounds at the hall in 1856 which became the Fernie Hunt. He was succeeded in turn by his nephew, T.M.J. Tailby (1862–1916) and George William A. Tailby (born 1893). Sir Richard Sutton, 2nd Baronet and a Master of the Quorn Hunt also resided at the Hall.
