= John Skeffington, 10th Viscount Massereene =

Irish peer and poet

John Foster-Skeffington, 10th Viscount Massereene KP (30 November 1812 – 28 April 1863) was an Irish peer and poet.

He was the son of Thomas Skeffington, 2nd Viscount Ferrard and his wife, Harriet Skeffington, 9th Viscountess Massereene. He inherited his mother's title upon her death in 1831, and his father's title upon his death in 1843. He was appointed a Knight of the Order of St Patrick on 3 July 1851. He was the first Lieutenant-Colonel Commandant of the Antrim Militia Artillery when it was raised at Carrickfergus Castle in November 1854.

On 1 August 1835 he married Olivia Grady, with whom he had four sons and four daughters. He was succeeded in his titles by his eldest son, Clotworthy Skeffington.

Peerage of Ireland
Preceded by Harriet Skeffington	Viscount Massereene; 1831–1863	Succeeded by Clotworthy Skeffington
Preceded by Thomas Skeffington	Viscount Ferrard; 1843–1863	Succeeded by Clotworthy Skeffington
