= John Clotworthy, 1st Viscount Massereene =

Anglo-Irish politician (died 1665)

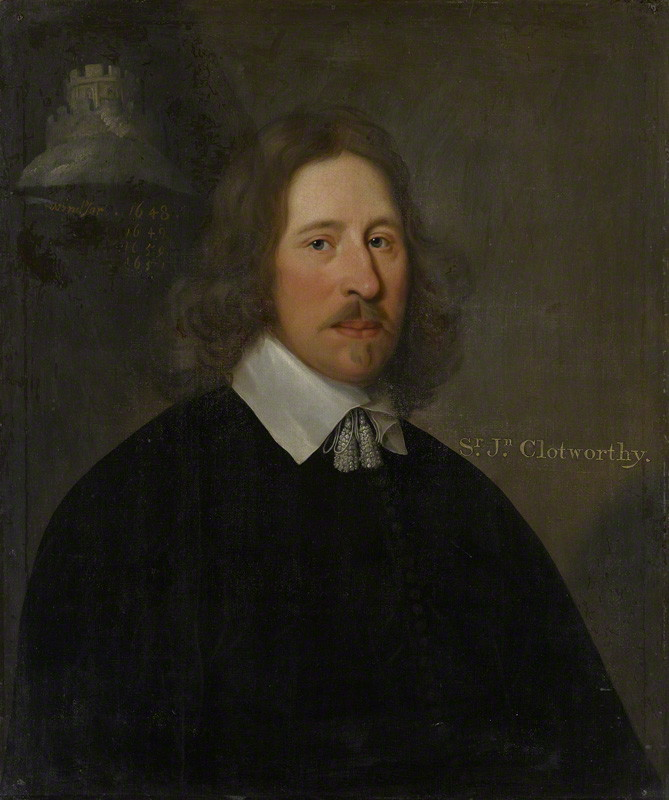
Sir John Clotworthy (from 1660 1st Viscount Massereene), National Portrait Gallery, London. In the top left corner is a depiction of the Round Tower of Windsor Castle with the dates 1648, 1649, 1650, 1651, marked. He was confined here until 1651 with five other distinguished prisoners, when all were dispersed as a precautionary measure

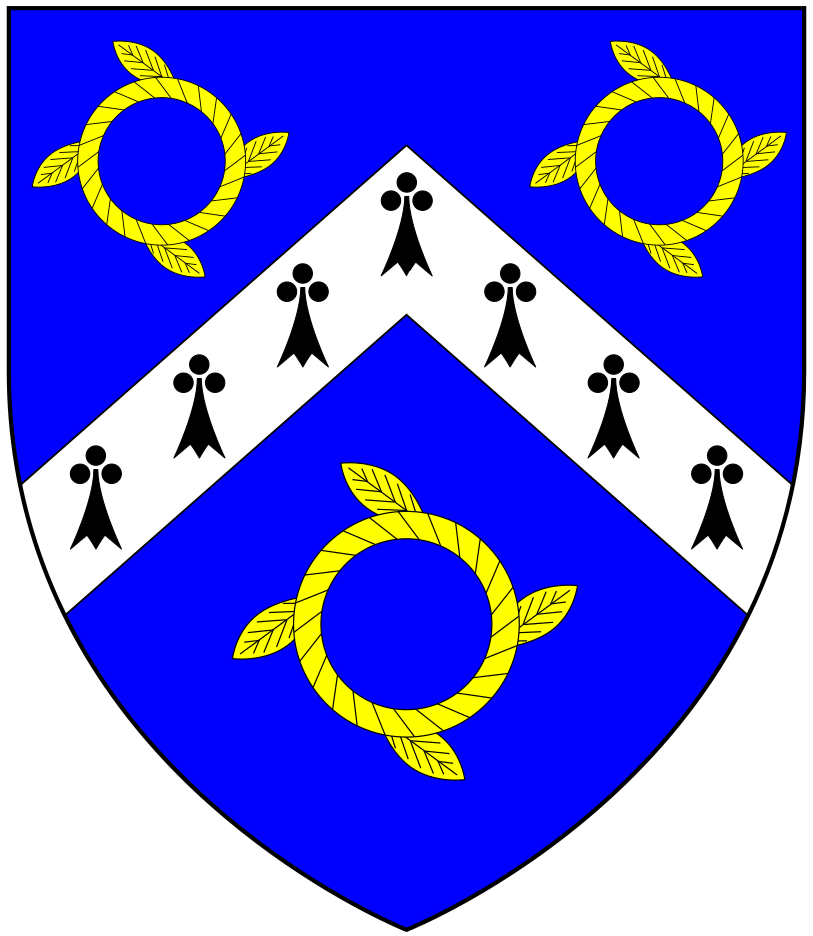
Arms of Clotworthy: Azure, a chevron ermine between three chaplets or

John Clotworthy, 1st Viscount Massereene (died September 1665) was a prominent Anglo-Irish politician.

== Origins ==
He was the son and heir of Sir Hugh Clotworthy (died 1630), High Sheriff of Antrim (who first came to Ireland as a soldier in the Nine Years' War), by his wife Mary Langford, daughter of Roger Langford of West Downe in the parish of Broadwoodwidger in Devon.

A sculpted escutcheon showing the arms of Clotworthy impaling Langford of Kilmackedret was displayed on the facade of Antrim Castle, now demolished. Sir Hugh Clotworthy was the second son of Thomas Clotworthy (born 1530) of Clotworthy in the parish of Wembworthy in Devon, by his third wife Dorothy Parker, a daughter of John Parker (ancestor of the Earl of Morley (1815)) of North Molton in Devon. Sir Hugh's paternal grandmother was Ivota Rashleigh, heiress of Rashleigh in Wembworthy, Devon, to which seat at some time before 1640, the senior line of the Clotworthy family eventually moved their residence from the nearby ancestral seat of Clotworthy.

== Career ==
John was elected to the Irish House of Commons as member for County Antrim in 1634, and was a member of the Long Parliament in England, in 1640, representing Maldon. Clotworthy was a vehement opponent of Thomas Wentworth, 1st Earl of Strafford, in whose impeachment he took an active share. He also took part in the prosecution of Archbishop Laud. He seems to have felt a deep personal hatred for both Strafford and Laud, springing perhaps from profound religious differences. He was criticised for his conduct at Laud's execution, where he thrust himself forward and harangued that elderly man, who was trying to prepare himself for death, on his alleged religious errors.

In 1646, during the Irish Confederate Wars he unsuccessfully negotiated with the Royalist commander James Butler, 1st Duke of Ormonde for the surrender of Dublin to the Parliamentary forces. In 1647, during the English Civil War he was accused of having betrayed the Parliamentarian cause, and also of embezzlement, in consequence of which charges he fled to the Continent, but returned to parliament in June 1648.

On 12 December 1648, he was arrested and remained in prison (including at Wallingford Castle) for nearly three years. In 1660, he was elected to attend the Irish Convention and supported the restoration of the monarchy. Having taken an active part in forwarding the Restoration of Charles II, he was employed in Ireland in arranging the affairs of the soldiers and other adventurers who had settled in Ireland.

Clotworthy in no way abated his old animosity against Papists and High Anglicans, despite the King's well-known leaning towards the Roman Catholic faith, and championed the cause of the Irish Presbyterians. Notwithstanding, being personally agreeable to King Charles II, his religious views were overlooked, and on 21 November 1660 he was created Baron Lough Neagh and Viscount Massereene in the Irish peerage, with the remainder in default of male heirs to his son-in-law, Sir John Skeffington.

== Marriage and children ==
In 1626 he married Margaret Jones, daughter of Roger Jones, 1st Viscount Ranelagh and his first wife Frances Moore, by whom he had a single daughter:

- Mary Clotworthy, wife of Sir John Skeffington, later 2nd Viscount Massereene.

== Death and succession ==
He died without male issue and as provided for in the special remainder, his title devolved onto his son-in-law Sir John Skeffington (husband of his daughter Mary Clotworthy), who became the 2nd Viscount Massereene and whose great-grandson, the 5th Viscount Massereene, was created Earl of Massereene in 1756. The earldom became extinct on the death of the 4th Earl without male issue in 1816, the viscounty and barony of Lough Neagh descending to his daughter Harriet Skeffington, whose husband, Thomas Foster, adopted the surname of Skeffington, and in 1824 inherited from his mother the titles of Viscount Ferrard and Baron Oriel of Collon in the Irish peerage, and from his father in 1828 that of Baron Oriel of Ferrard in the peerage of the United Kingdom.

== Character ==
Historians, especially Strafford's biographer Veronica Wedgwood, have dealt very harshly with Clotworthy as a human being. Wedgwood called him: "a heartless, dour and repellent man who throughout his life showed a consistent inhumanity towards his fellow men". Wedgwood does however concede that, unlike others who conspired to bring Strafford down, Clotworthy was motivated less by self-interest than by genuine religious fanaticism. Laud's biographer Hugh Trevor-Roper also criticises him for his unpleasant behaviour at Laud's execution, where he engaged him in religious controversy while Laud was trying to prepare himself for death.

== Clotworthys today ==
Many Clotworthys since then have emigrated to other countries around the world, many to America. There are very few known to survive in Northern Ireland.

Peerage of Ireland
New creation	Viscount Massereene; 1660–1665	Succeeded by John Skeffington
