= Clotworthy Skeffington, 3rd Viscount Massereene =

Anglo-Irish soldier, politician and peer

Clotworthy Skeffington, 3rd Viscount Massereene (1661 – 1714) was an Anglo-Irish soldier, politician and peer.

Skeffington was the son of John Skeffington, 2nd Viscount Massereene and Mary Clotworthy, the daughter of John Clotworthy, 1st Viscount Massereene.

During the Williamite War in Ireland, he joined the Earl of Mount Alexander's Protestant militia in 1688 and received a commission as a colonel from William III of England in January 1689. Skeffington participated in the successful defence of Derry during the Siege of Derry from April to August 1689. Like his father, he was attainted by James II of England's Patriot Parliament in Dublin in 1689.

After the war, Skeffington was the Member of Parliament for County Antrim in the Irish House of Commons from 1692 to 1693. He inherited his father's peerage in 1695 and assumed his seat in the Irish House of Lords. He was appointed Governor of Londonderry in 1699.

On 9 March 1680, he married Rachel Hungerford, daughter of Sir Edward Hungerford, by whom he had one son and three daughters. He was succeeded in his title by his son, Clotworthy Skeffington.

Parliament of Ireland
Preceded by Cormack O'Neile; Randal MacDonnell	Member of Parliament for County Antrim; 1692–1693; With: Sir Robert Colville	Succeeded by Sir Robert Colville; Arthur Upton
Military offices
Preceded by Matthew Bridges	Governor of Londonderry; 1699–1714	Succeeded by Thomas Meredyth
Peerage of Ireland
Preceded by John Skeffington	Viscount Massereene; 1695–1714	Succeeded by Clotworthy Skeffington
