= Antrim Castle =

17th-century house in Antrim, Ireland, now demolished

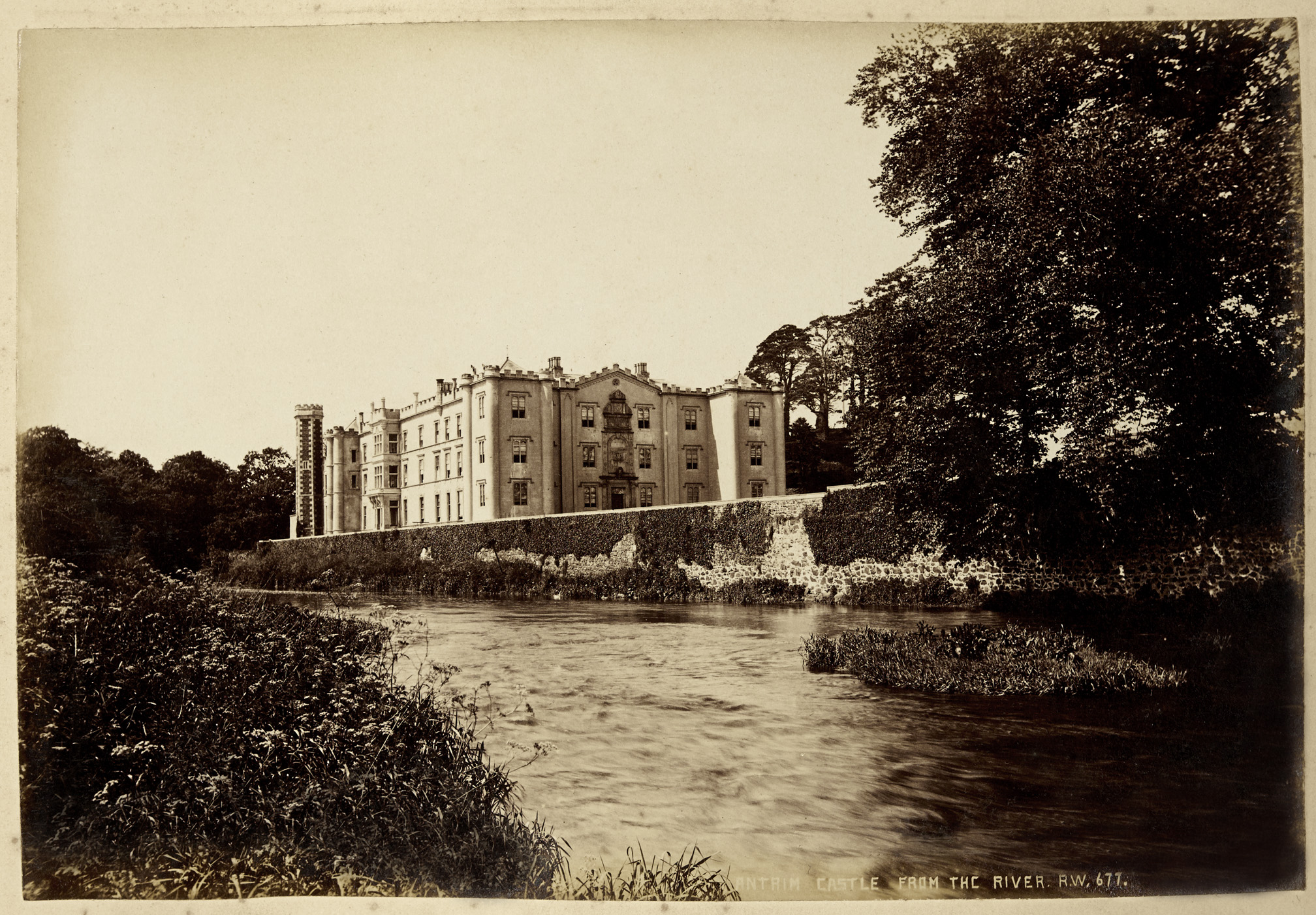
- Antrim Castle c.1888

- Location within Northern Ireland

General information
- Type: Fortified mansion
- Location: Antrim, County Antrim, Northern Ireland
- Coordinates: 54°43′19″N 6°13′51″W
- Construction started: 1613
- Completed: 1662

Antrim Castle or Massereene Castle was a fortified mansion in Antrim, County Antrim, Northern Ireland, on the banks of the Sixmilewater River. It was built in stages between 1613 and 1662. It was destroyed by fire in 1922 and finally demolished in the 1970s. All that remains are a slightly raised grassed platform as well as a freestanding Italian stair tower built in 1887, and a gatehouse built around 1818 with twin neo-Tudor towers, with older connecting walls. The gardens are a popular tourist attraction on the Randalstown Road in Antrim.

== History ==
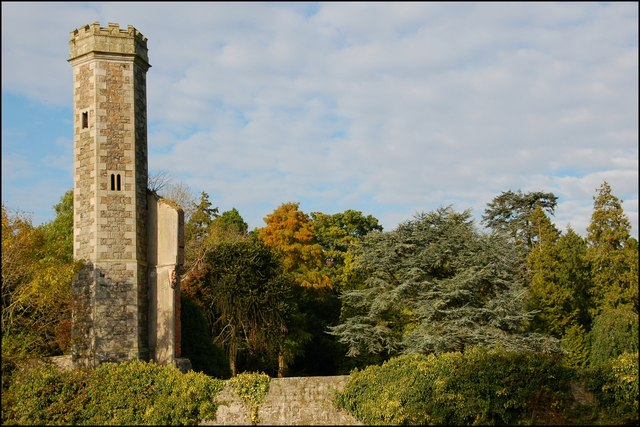
The remaining Italianate tower (1887).

Antrim Castle was built originally in 1613 by an English settler, Sir Hugh Clotworthy, and enlarged in 1662 by his son, John Clotworthy, 1st Viscount Massereene. It was through his daughter and heiress, Mary, and her marriage to Sir John Skeffington, 4th Baronet (by special remainder he would become the 2nd Viscount Massereene), that the estate and title came to the latter family. The castle was rebuilt in 1813.

In March 1689 the castle was raided by Jacobite General Richard Hamilton and his men who looted Viscount Massereene's silver plate and other silverware and furniture up to a value of £3,000, a considerable loss at the time.

For some time the castle was used for political conferences; in 1806, The Rt. Hon. John Foster, the last Speaker of the Irish House of Commons, was reported to have spoken in the Oak Room of the castle at a meeting.

At 3am after a small family gathering on 28 October 1922, the castle caught fire and was destroyed. Although much of the evidence pointed to arson by the IRA, the official verdict was not conclusive, thus no insurance claim was paid out. The castle remained a ruin until its demolition in 1970.

In 2022, centenary anniversary commemorations were held which included the notable historian and author Lyndsy Spence giving tours of the Castle Gardens. In December 2022, Antrim historian Stephen McCracken published definitive evidence showing that the castle had been destroyed by the IRA, citing testimonies preserved in the National Archives of Ireland. His evidence focused on the testimony of Kevin Sheils and another IRA commander called Fitzpatrick.

== Features ==
Antrim Castle had been rebuilt in 1813 as a three-storey Georgian-Gothic castellated mansion, designed by Dublin architect, John Bowden. The Restoration style doorway of the original castle, featuring heraldry and a head of Charles I, was re-erected as the central feature of the entrance front. It also had tower-like projections at the corners of round-angle turrets. A tall hexagonal turret of ashlar was added to the front in 1887 when the castle was further enlarged. There was also a 17th-century formal garden, unique in Ulster.

The gardens also featured a long canal with another canal at right angles to it, making a T shape, as well as a motte of a Norman castle. Jacobean-Revival outbuildings of coursed rubble basalt with sandstone dressings were built about 1840. The entrance gateway to the demesne has octagonal turrets. The stable block was later converted for use as a family residence and renamed Clotworthy House. This was acquired by Antrim Borough Council and converted for use as an Arts Centre in 1982; Clotworthy Arts Centre operated until 2009, when it was revamped as a conference centre.

The formal gardens were the subject of a £6m restoration project, by Antrim Borough Council supported by the Heritage Lottery Fund, to preserve the historic site. Antrim Castle Gardens won the Ulster in Bloom Special Award 2012.

A statue of Queen Elizabeth II and Prince Philip, Duke of Edinburgh, was unveiled in the castle gardens in September 2024.

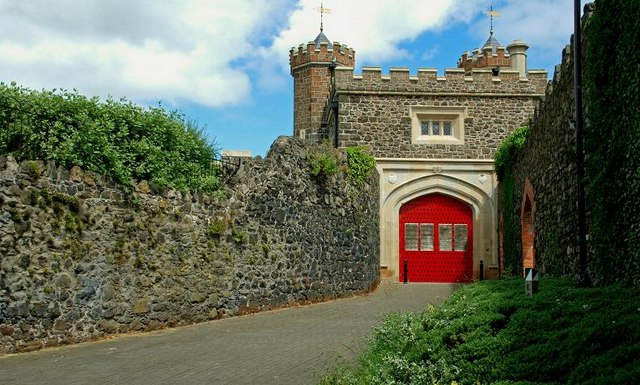
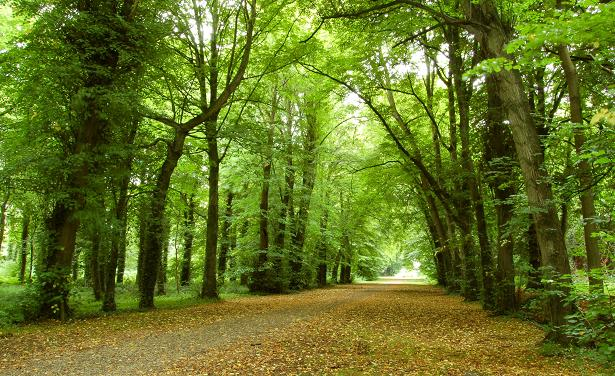
Left: Barbican gate. Right: Castle gardens.

== See also ==
- List of tourist attractions in Ireland
