= Viscount Massereene =

Title in the peerage of Ireland

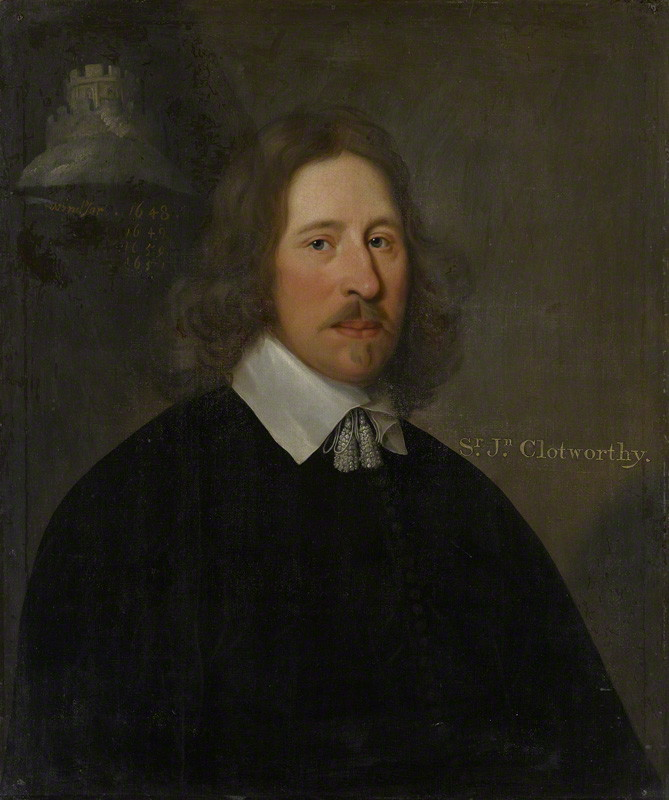
John Clotworthy, 1st Viscount Massereene

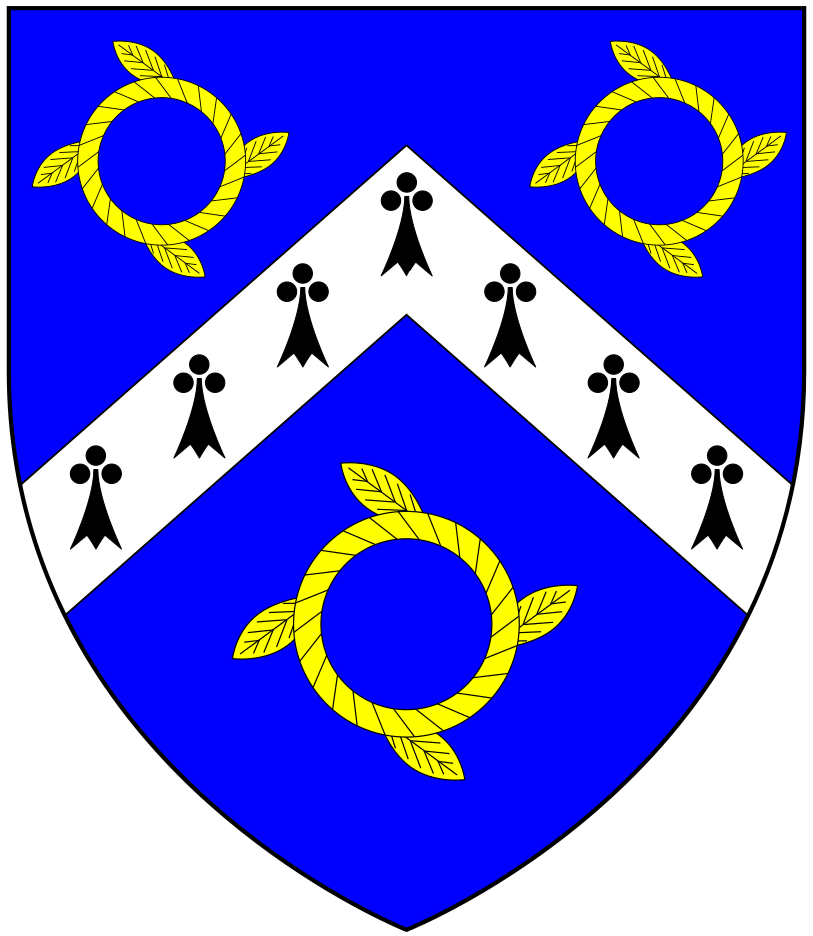
Arms of Clotworthy: Azure, a chevron ermine between three chaplets or

Viscount Massereene is a title in the Peerage of Ireland. It was created in 1660, along with the subsidiary title of Baron Loughneagh. From 1665 to 1816, the Skeffington Baronetcy of Fisherwick was attached to the viscountcy, and from 1756 to 1816 the Viscounts also held the title of Earl of Massereene. Since 1843 the peerages are united with titles of Viscount Ferrard, of Oriel, and Baron Oriel, both in the Peerage of Ireland, and Baron Oriel, in the Peerage of the United Kingdom. The Viscount also holds the subsidiary titles of Baron Loughneagh (1660) and Baron Oriel (1790) in the Peerage of Ireland and Baron Oriel (1821) in the Peerage of the United Kingdom. As Baron Oriel, he sat in the House of Lords until 1999.

The family seat was Chilham Castle, near Canterbury, Kent.

== Viscount Massereene ==
John Clotworthy was a prominent Anglo-Irish politician during the Civil War. In 1660 he was created Baron Loughneagh (after Lough Neagh) and Viscount Massereene in the Peerage of Ireland, with remainder to his son-in-law Sir John Skeffington, 4th Baronet, of Fisherwick, the husband of his daughter the Hon. Mary Clotworthy, and in default thereof to his heirs general. This makes the peerages unique in being the only extant Irish peerages that can descend through heirs general rather than heirs male only. Lord Massereene was succeeded according to the special remainder by his son-in-law, the second Viscount. In 1756 his great-grandson, the fifth Viscount, was created Earl of Massereene in Peerage of Ireland. However, the earldom and baronetcy became extinct in 1816 on the death of his grandson, the fourth Earl. The barony of Loughneugh and viscountcy of Massereene were inherited according to the special remainder (which allowed them to be passed on through the female line) by his daughter Harriet, the ninth Viscountess. She was the wife of Thomas Henry Foster, 2nd Viscount Ferrard (see below). Lord Ferrard and Lady Massereene were both succeeded by their son, the tenth Viscount Massereene and third Viscount Ferrard. In 1817 he assumed by Royal licence the surname of Skeffington in lieu of Foster. His son, the eleventh and fourth Viscount, notably served as Lord Lieutenant of County Louth. His son, the twelfth and fifth Viscount, was Lord Lieutenant of Antrim and a member of the Senate of Northern Ireland. As of 2017 the titles are held by the latter's grandson, the fourteenth and seventh Viscount, who succeeded his father in 1992. Both he and his father have been presidents of the Conservative Monday Club.

== Viscount Ferrard and Baron Oriel ==
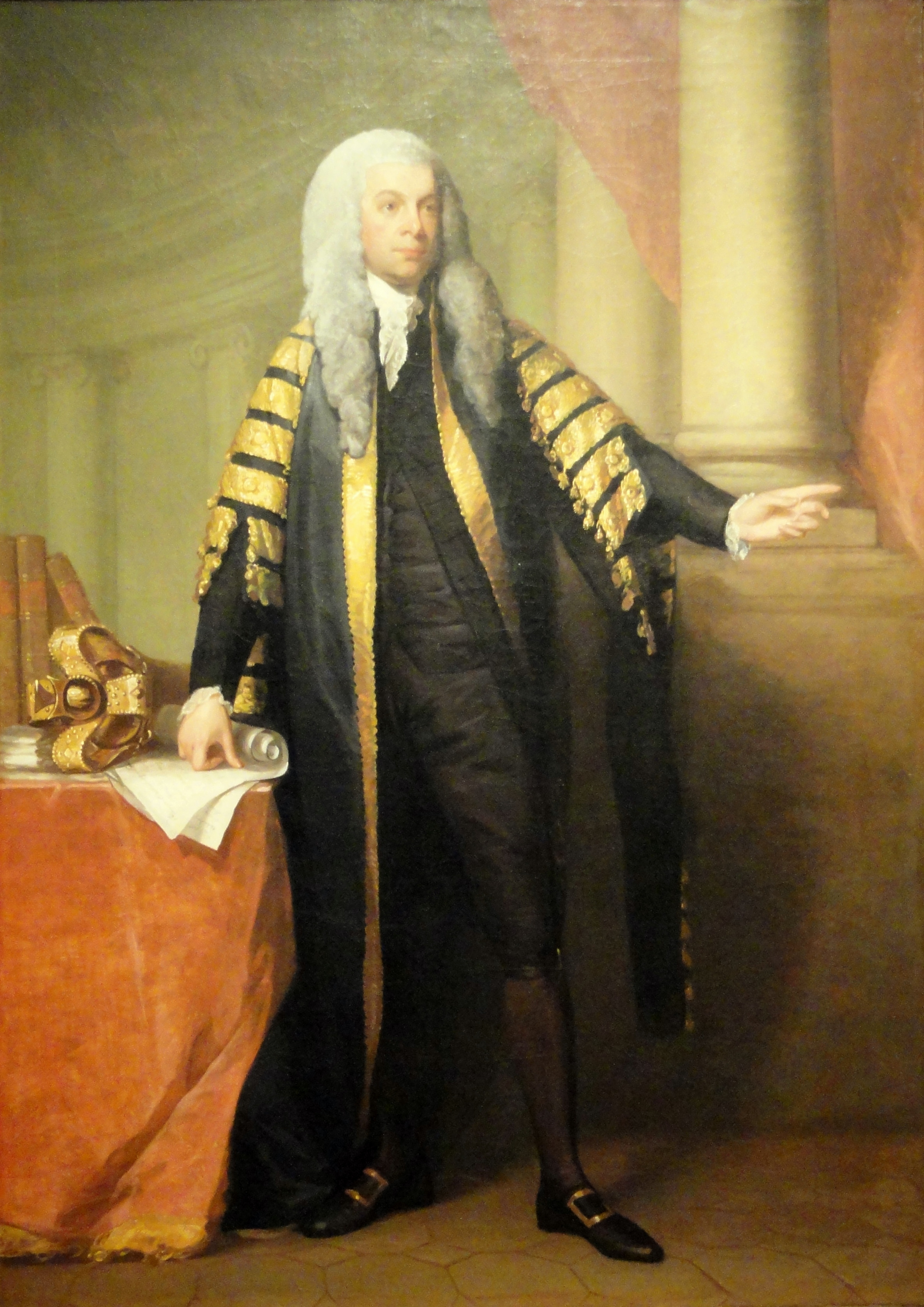
John Foster, 1st Baron Oriel

John Foster served as Chancellor of the Irish Exchequer and as Speaker of the Irish House of Commons and also represented County Louth in the British House of Commons. In 1821 he was created Baron Oriel, of Ferrard in the County of Louth, in the Peerage of the United Kingdom. His wife Margaretta Amelia Foster was created Baroness Oriel, of Collon, in 1790, and Viscountess Ferrard, of Oriel in 1797, both in the Peerage of Ireland. Both Lord Oriel and Lady Ferrard were succeeded by their son, the second Viscount. He was the husband of Harriet Skeffington, 9th Viscountess Massereene. Both he and his wife were succeeded by their son, the tenth Viscount Massereene and third Viscount Ferrard. The titles remain united. For later history of the peerages, see above.

== Skeffington baronets, of Fisherwick ==
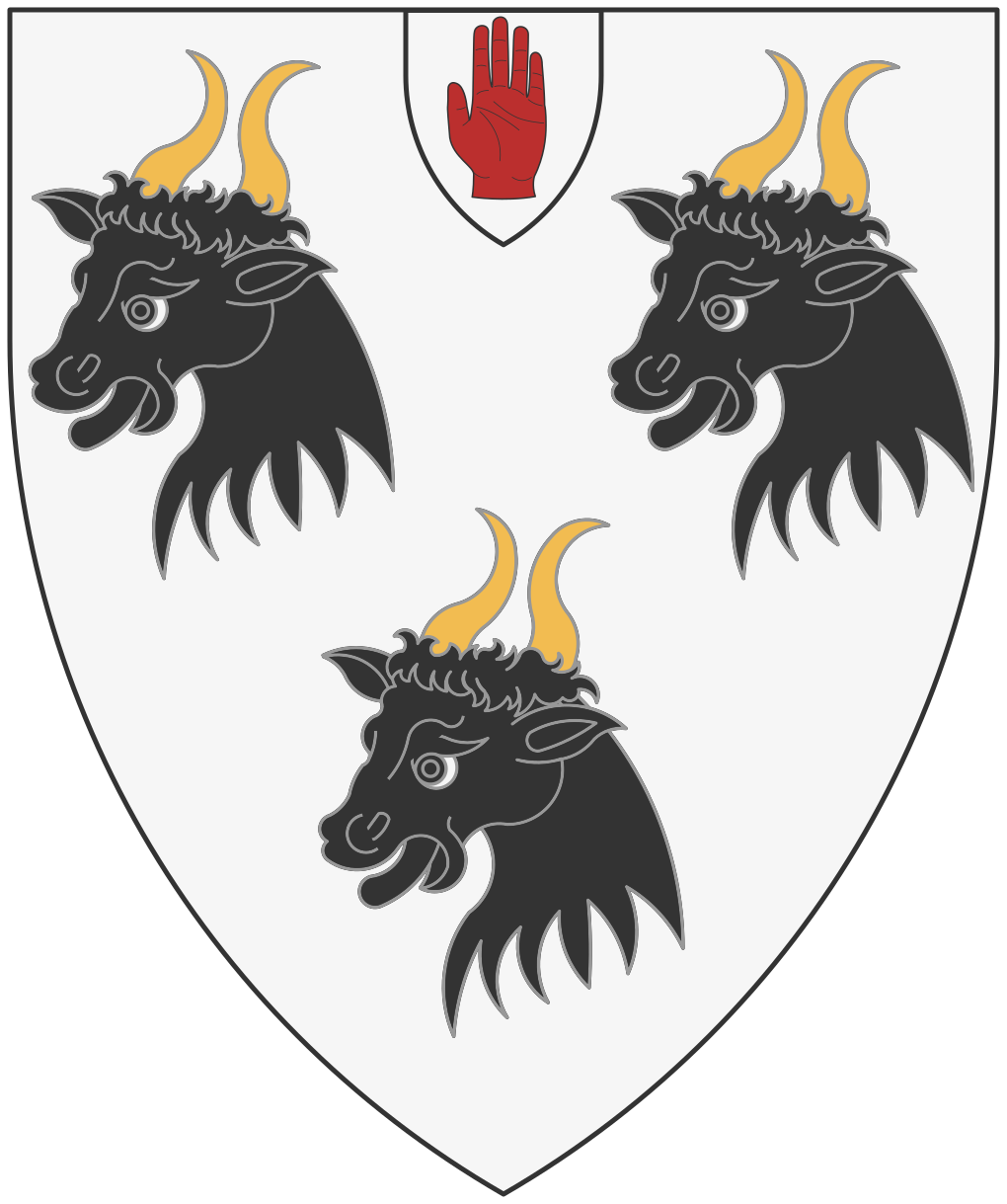
Escutcheon of the Skeffington baronets of Fisherwick

William Skeffington was High Sheriff of Staffordshire in 1601 and 1623. On 8 May 1627 he was created a Baronet, of Fisherwick in the County of Stafford, in the Baronetage of England. The 2nd Baronet was Member of Parliament for Newcastle-under-Lyme and served as High Sheriff of Staffordshire in 1637. The 4th Baronet married Hon. Mary Clotworthy, daughter of John Clotworthy, 1st Viscount Massereene. In 1665 he succeeded his father-in-law as second Viscount Massereene according to a special remainder in the letters patent. The titles remained united until the extinction of the baronetcy in 1816. For later history of the titles, see above.

== Viscounts Massereene (1660) ==
- John Clotworthy, 1st Viscount Massereene (died 1665)
- John Skeffington, 2nd Viscount Massereene (died 1695)
- Clotworthy Skeffington, 3rd Viscount Massereene (1660–1714)
- Clotworthy Skeffington, 4th Viscount Massereene (died 1738)
- Clotworthy Skeffington, 5th Viscount Massereene (1715–1757) (created Earl of Massereene in 1756)

=== Earls of Massereene (1756) ===
- Clotworthy Skeffington, 1st Earl of Massereene, 5th Viscount Massereene (1715–1757)
- Clotworthy Skeffington, 2nd Earl of Massereene, 6th Viscount Massereene (1743–1805)
- Henry Skeffington, 3rd Earl of Massereene, 7th Viscount Massereene (died 1811)
- Chichester Skeffington, 4th Earl of Massereene, 8th Viscount Massereene (died 1816)

=== Viscounts Massereene (1660; reverted) ===
- Harriet Skeffington, 9th Viscountess Massereene (died 1831)
- John Skeffington, 10th Viscount Massereene, 3rd Viscount Ferrard (1812–1863)
- Clotworthy John Skeffington, 11th Viscount Massereene, 4th Viscount Ferrard (1842–1905)
- Algernon William John Clotworthy Skeffington, 12th Viscount Massereene, 5th Viscount Ferrard (1873–1956)
- John Clotworthy Talbot Foster Whyte-Melville-Skeffington, 13th Viscount Massereene, 6th Viscount Ferrard, 6th Baron Oriel (1914–1992)
- John David Clotworthy Whyte-Melville Foster Skeffington, 14th Viscount Massereene, 7th Viscount Ferrard, 7th Baron Oriel (1940–2024)
- Charles Clotworthy Whyte-Melville Foster Skeffington, 15th Viscount Massereene, 8th Viscount Ferrard, 8th Baron Oriel (born 1973)

The heir apparent is the present holder's son, the Hon. James Algernon Foster Clotworthy Skeffington (born 2014).

== Skeffington baronets, of Fisherwick (1627) ==
- Sir William Skeffington, 1st Baronet (died 1635)
- Sir John Skeffington, 2nd Baronet (c. 1590–1651).
- Sir William Skeffington, 3rd Baronet (died 1652)
- Sir John Skeffington, 4th Baronet (died 1695) (succeeded as 2nd Viscount Massereene in 1665)

See above for further succession.

== Viscounts Ferrard (1797) ==
- Margaretta Amelia Foster, 1st Viscountess Ferrard (died 1824)
- Thomas Henry Skeffington, 2nd Viscount Ferrard (1772–1843)
- John Skeffington, 3rd Viscount Ferrard (1812–1863) (succeeded as 10th Viscount Massereene in 1831)

See above for further succession.

== Barons Oriel (1821) ==
- John Foster, 1st Baron Oriel (1740–1828)
- Thomas Henry Skeffington, 2nd Baron Oriel (1772–1843) (succeeded as 2nd Viscount Ferrard in 1821)

See above for further succession.
