= John Skeffington, 14th Viscount Massereene =

British peer (1940–2024)

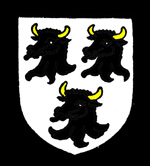
Coat of arms of the Skeffington family

John David Clotworthy Whyte-Melville Foster Skeffington, 14th Viscount Massereene and 7th Viscount Ferrard (3 June 1940 – 13 November 2024) was a British peer.

== Life and career ==
John Skeffington succeeded his father, John Whyte-Melville-Skeffington, 13th Viscount Massereene, in 1992 and regularly attended the House of Lords (where he sat under the title Baron Oriel, his Irish Viscountcies not entitling him to a seat) until the passage of the House of Lords Act 1999 which ended the automatic right for hereditary peers to sit in the House of Lords. Lord Massereene stood unsuccessfully as a UKIP candidate in a House of Lords by-election in 2013.

Educated at Millfield and the Institute Monte Rosa, he served in the Grenadier Guards regiment 1958–1961. He is a major landowner, holds various directorships, and is a stockbroker with M.D.Barnard & Co; member of the London Stock Exchange 1961–1964, and from 1970 to the present. He married in 1970, to Ann Denise Rowlandson. The couple have two sons, including Charles Skeffington (his heir), and one daughter.

Lord Massereene oversaw the sale of Chilham Castle in 1996, the family's ancestral home in Kent; the family seat is now at High Northolme, Salton, North Yorkshire.

Like his father, he was President of the Conservative Monday Club, and was a patron of Right Now!, a magazine edited by Derek Turner. He also participated on the council of The Freedom Association and was a signatory, as "Baron Oriel", to the Sanity Petition ("Sanity" is an acronym for "Subjects Against the Nice Treaty") urging the Queen to raise with the government the issue of the European integration 'directly threaten[ing the British] rights and freedoms'.

Lord Massereene died from sepsis and pneumonia on 13 November 2024, at the age of 84.

== Sources ==
The Times and Sunday Times online archives

Peerage of Ireland
Preceded by John Whyte-Melville-Skeffington	Viscount Massereene; Viscount Ferrard; 1992–2024	Succeeded by Charles Skeffington
