= Goadby =

Village in Leicestershire, England

Coordinates: 52.583333°N 0.883333°W

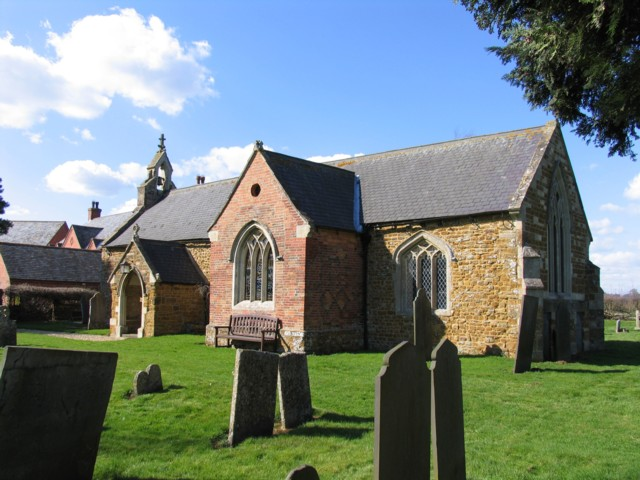
- St John the Baptist church

- Location within Leicestershire
- OS grid reference: SP756990
- Civil parish: Goadby
- District: Harborough
- Shire county: Leicestershire
- Region: East Midlands
- Country: England
- Sovereign state: United Kingdom
- Post town: Leicester
- Postcode district: LE7
- Police: Leicestershire
- Fire: Leicestershire
- Ambulance: East Midlands
- UK Parliament: Rutland and Stamford

Goadby is a village and civil parish in the Harborough district of Leicestershire, England, about 8 miles north of Market Harborough. It had a population of 204 according to the 2011 census.

The village's name means 'farm/settlement of Gauti'.

Goadby has a Church of England Parish church, St. John the Baptist, which is of 13th-century origin. The church was extensively renovated in the 19th century. Services are held on the first Sunday of every month. The church is part of a group of churches ministered to from Billesdon. Every year, a fundraising fete is held in Goadby on the Saturday of the August Bank Holiday weekend to provide funds for the Church.

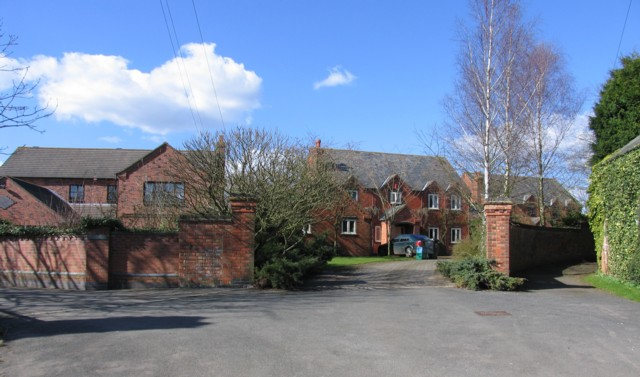
New housing in Goadby

Goadby has no industry, and is notable chiefly for its stud farm, at which the celebrated race horse Desert Orchid was foaled.

Goadby's name, with the "-by" suffix, indicates that it is of Danish origin. Goadby is recorded in the Domesday Book as "Goutebi".

"Goadby, Leicester, is a chapelry in Billesdon parish near a branch of the river Welland. This is annexed to the vicarage of Billesdon, in the diocese of Peterborough. The church was restored in 1854."

One of the current residents of Goadby is Kev Burgess, Racing Manager for Diamond Racing, the syndicate that owns 2021 Welsh Grand National and 2023 Classic Chase Winner, Iwilldoit.
