= Clotworthy Skeffington, 1st Earl of Massereene =

Anglo-Irish peer

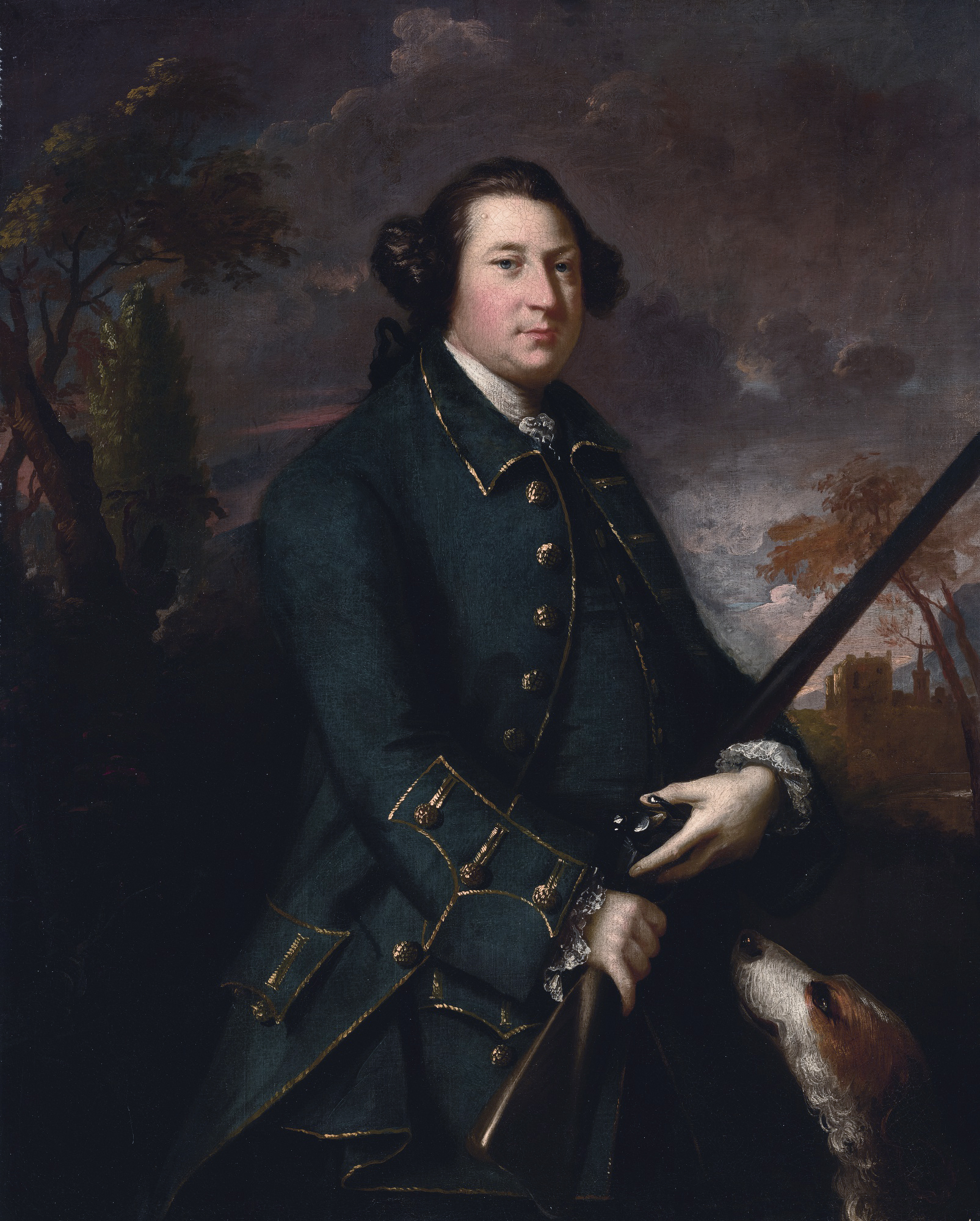
Clotworthy Skeffington, 1st Earl of Massereene (1714-1757), by Joshua Reynolds

Clotworthy Skeffington, 1st Earl of Massereene PC (I) (1715 – 14 September 1757) was an Anglo-Irish peer.

Massereene was the son of Clotworthy Skeffington, 4th Viscount Massereene and Lady Catherine Chichester, daughter of Arthur Chichester, 3rd Earl of Donegall. He succeeded to his father's title in 1738 and assumed his seat in the Irish House of Lords. He was made a Member of the Privy Council of Ireland in 1746, and on 28 July 1756 he was created Earl of Massereene in the Peerage of Ireland. He died suddenly just over a year later.

Massereene married firstly Anne Daniel on 16 March 1738; however, she died two years later. He married secondly Anne Eyre (granddaughter of Sir Willoughby Hickman, 3rd Baronet) on 25 November 1741, and together they had six children. On his death he was succeeded by his eldest son, also named Clotworthy Skeffington.

Peerage of Ireland
New creation	Earl of Massereene; 1756–1757	Succeeded by Clotworthy Skeffington
Preceded by Clotworthy Skeffington	Viscount Massereene; 1738–1757	Succeeded by Clotworthy Skeffington
