= Skeffington =

Village in Leicestershire, England

Coordinates: 52.616°N 0.903°W

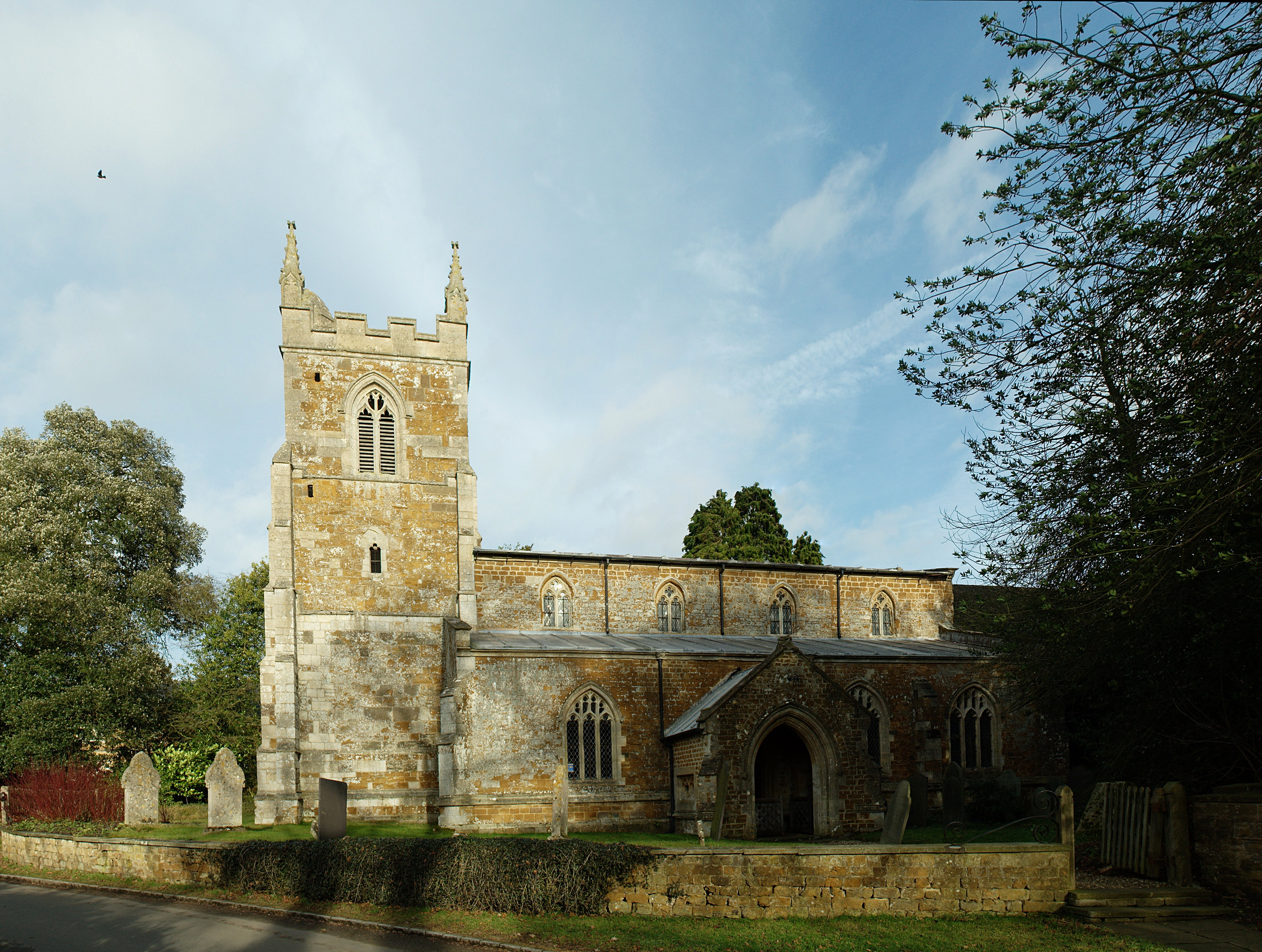
- Church of St Thomas Becket, Skeffington

- Location within Leicestershire
- Population: 223 (2011)
- OS grid reference: SK739025
- District: Harborough
- Shire county: Leicestershire
- Region: East Midlands
- Country: England
- Sovereign state: United Kingdom
- Post town: LEICESTER
- Postcode district: LE7
- Dialling code: 0116
- Police: Leicestershire
- Fire: Leicestershire
- Ambulance: East Midlands
- UK Parliament: Melton and Syston

Skeffington is a village and civil parish in the Harborough district of Leicestershire, England. It lies 11 miles/18 km east of Leicester on the A47 Uppingham road, between Billesdon and Tugby and Keythorpe. The population at the 2011 census (including Rolleston) was 223.

== Heritage ==
The derivation is from the Sceaft tribe, whose name may possibly have derived from sceap, meaning sheep. The first written record of the village appeared as Scifitone in the Domesday Book in 1086, when it was under royal ownership and housed 186 villagers, 112 smallholders, 204 freemen and 1 priest. It was recorded as "Sceaftinton" in 1192.

The village's church is dedicated to St Thomas Becket and is a Grade II* listed building. It dates from the 13th century, but underwent a rebuild in 1860. There is jumbled medieval stained glass in the east chapel window, with damaged figures from a monument to Thomas Skeffington, M. P., sheriff of the county in Elizabethan times. There is also a 1651 monument to Sir John Skeffington; several floor slabs commemorate other members of the family.

Skeffington Hall, adjacent to the church, is also Grade II* listed. It has some Tudor features. The estate passed in 1786 to an Irishman named Farrell who took the name Skeffington. He pulled down 21 houses in the village to improve his view from the Hall, but overspent, so that the estate was sold again in 1811. In 1860 it was bought by William Tailby, who founded the Billesdon fox hunt, of which he became master.

The village lay historically in the hundred of East Goscote.

== Amenities ==
The Anglican church is part of a group benefice with Keyham, Billesdon, Goadby, Hungarton and Rolleston. There are no commercial or educational facilities in the village. The nearest nursery school, primary school, public houses, shops, filling station and sports facilities are at Houghton on the Hill (4 miles/6.4 km).

There is an hourly daytime bus service from Skeffington Turn to Leicester and Uppingham, Mondays to Fridays. The nearest railway station is at Leicester (10 miles/16 km). The nearest scheduled air services are at East Midlands Airport (30 miles/48 km).

When the Peterborough TV mast opened in October 1959, a transmitter on a hill relayed the BBC Midlands broadcast to Peterborough from Sutton Coldfield. Once the GPO link from Norwich was built in December 1959, it had the Norwich TV relayed to Peterborough. Leicestershire Police had a transmitter on the hill from around 1950.

== Notable people ==
In order of birth:

- Sir William Skeffington (c. 1465–1535), Lord Deputy of Ireland
- Leonard Skeffington (fl. first half of 16th century), son of William, was Lieutenant of the Tower of London and inventor of Skevington's gyves, an instrument of torture.
- Anthony Skeffington, cousin of William, (died after 1535), Master of the Rolls in Ireland
- Sir John Skeffington, 2nd Baronet (c. 1590–1651), Staffordshire landowner and Royalist politician, died at Skeffington. His wife was Cicely Skeffington, who came from the parish.
