= Skeffington baronets =

Set index for Skeffington baronets

There have been two baronetcies created for persons with the surname Skeffington, one in the Baronetage of England and one in the Baronetage of Great Britain. One is extant.

- Skeffington baronets of Fisherwick (1627): see Viscount Massereene and Ferrard
- Farrell-Skeffington, later Skeffington baronets of Skeffington (1786)
