= Billesdon =

Village in Leicestershire, England

Coordinates: 52.6185°N 0.9400°W

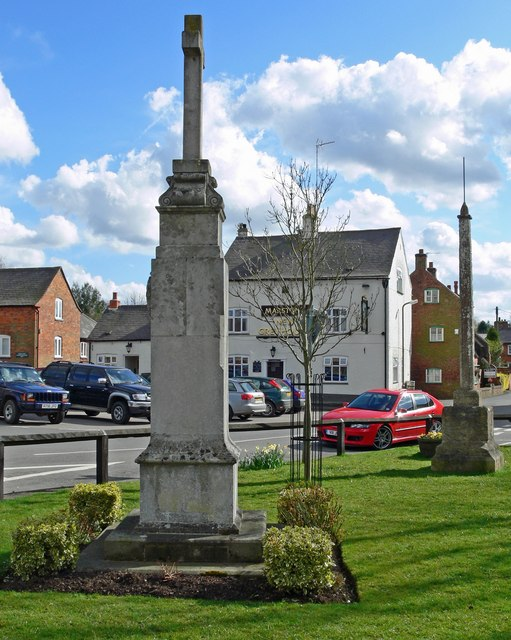
- Village green and market cross

- Location within Leicestershire
- Population: 901 (2011)
- OS grid reference: SK718028
- District: Harborough
- Shire county: Leicestershire
- Region: East Midlands
- Country: England
- Sovereign state: United Kingdom
- Post town: LEICESTER
- Postcode district: LE7
- Dialling code: 0116
- Police: Leicestershire
- Fire: Leicestershire
- Ambulance: East Midlands
- UK Parliament: Rutland and Stamford

Billesdon (/ˈbɪlzdən/) is a village and civil parish in the Harborough district of Leicestershire, England, with a population of 745 according to the 2001 census, increasing to 901 at the 2011 census. It is just off the A47, nine miles east of Leicester. The Billesdon bypass opened in October 1986. Nearby places include Houghton on the Hill, Skeffington, Tilton on the Hill, and Gaulby. The Billesdon Brook flows through the village.

Billesdon was formerly the seat of Billesdon Rural District, which was merged into the Harborough district in 1974 under the Local Government Act 1972.

== History ==
The village's name either means 'the hill of Bil' or 'sword-shaped hill' suggesting that it had a sharp ridge.

An earthwork just below the crest on the south side of Life Hill may be a promontory fort.

Domesday Book enumerated 25 people here in 1086. The number of households grew substantially between 1563 and 1670, from 38 to 134. In 1851 the village had 1,085 residents. Bricks and stockings were once manufactured here. By the 20th century Billesdon had reverted to an agricultural village. The population declined to 543 by 1931. The population of the parish in 2011 was 901.

Two fairs, annually on 23 April and 25 July, and a weekly Friday market, were granted in 1618. The market was held on the green, where Front Street meets the main road, and the base and shaft of the former market cross can still be seen. The market and one fair had been discontinued by the end of the 18th century, but one annual fair remained, and was noted for the sale of brass, pewter and toys. Cattle fairs were held from 1846 until the early years of the 20th century.

The fields were inclosed in 1764. Land tax records of the 18th and 19th centuries give the impression of a village of smaller landholders.

The Quorn and Fernie hunts had stables in the village.

There was a parish workhouse in the village by 1776. Billesdon became the centre of a new poor law union in 1835, and a new workhouse at the west of the village, with an entrance from Coplow Lane opened in 1846. The building became a military hospital in the First World War.

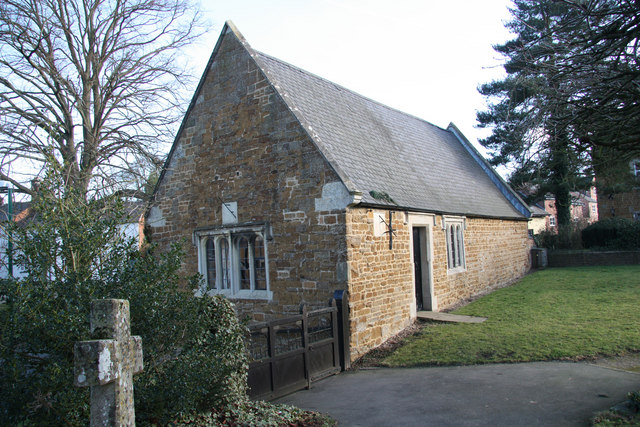
The Old School

The old school, which still stands in the village, was erected by William Sharpe of Rolleston as a free school for the parish. It was also used for vestry meetings. The National School and master's house were built in 1875.

== Amenities ==
Billesdon has several amenities including two public houses: the Queens Head, situated on Church Street, and The New Greyhound Inn, situated in the Market Place. There is also a village shop, a hairdresser and a doctors' surgery. On Church Street there is a post office. There is a mobile butcher and a mobile fishmonger who each visit once a week. A mobile chip shop visits twice a week. There is a fire station. The Coplow Centre is Billesdon's own leisure centre featuring multi purpose sports area and a concert hall. The centre has various events taking place throughout the year such as drama productions, entertainment evenings, sports, etc. The church is St John the Baptist. There is an FM transmitter on Life Hill close to Tilton on the Hill at Lord Morton's Covert wood at Sludge Hall.

== The parish church, and religious nonconformity ==
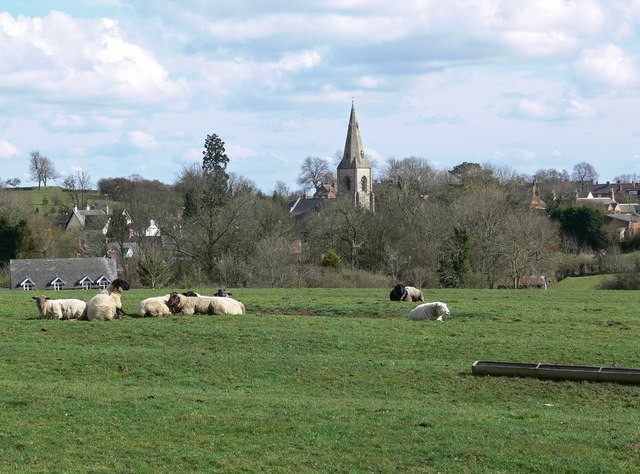
Church of St John the Baptist, Billesdon, with ridge and furrow in foreground

There was a church here by 1162, which had been given to Leicester Abbey by William de Syfrewast. The present Church of England ironstone building, on Church Street near the junction with Brook Lane, is dedicated to St. John the Baptist and comprises a nave, north and south aisles, chancel, tower and spire. The base of the tower and the north wall of the arcade were probably both built before 1250; the upper stages of the tower and the spire are from the later 13th-century; the north aisle may have been rebuilt in the 14th century; the chancel was rebuilt in the 15th century. When John Throsby visited in 1790 he found the 'principal aisle' was 'crowded with two shabby galleries, not unlike two large pigeon boxes stuck against a wall'. The south aisle was built in 1864, when traces of an earlier south aisle were found, which no one then alive could remember. The old box pews, galleries and high pulpit were taken away in 1864, when the church was restored.

Very detailed arrangements were agreed for the payment of tithes to the vicar in the 17th and 18th centuries, including that he was entitled to the tithes of corn and hay on enclosed land only if the closes showed no signs of ridge and furrow.

The present vicar of Billesdon parish church is responsible for other nearby parish churches including those of Goadby and Noseley.

=== Non-conformity ===
The earliest record of Protestant nonconformity is from 1719. A General Baptist chapel was built in 1812. A congregation of Particular Baptists formed in 1820. The Salem Chapel in West Lane was built in 1846 for the Particular Baptists and the Independents. A Wesleyan Chapel was built by 1854.
