= Clotworthy Skeffington, 2nd Earl of Massereene =

Anglo-Irish peer (1742–1805)

Clotworthy Skeffington, 2nd Earl of Massereene (28 January 1742 – 28 February 1805) was an Anglo-Irish peer who was imprisoned in France for almost twenty years.

== Biography ==
Massereene was the son of Clotworthy Skeffington, 1st Earl of Massereene and his second wife, Anne. He inherited his father's earldom in 1757 and entered Corpus Christi College, Cambridge the following year.

After visiting Paris in 1765, he was imprisoned in For-l'Évêque in 1769/70 for having accrued huge debts of between 15,000 and 20,000 French livre. He maintained a lavish lifestyle in the prison, entertaining fellow prisoners. Massereene attempted to escape in June 1770, but his plan failed. When For-l'Évêque was closed in 1780, Massereene was transferred to La Force Prison before he was freed alongside other prisoners by a mob on 13 July 1789, a day prior to the Storming of the Bastille. He subsequently escaped to England, from where he returned to his family seat in County Antrim.

He died without issue in 1805 and was succeeded in his title by his younger brother, Henry.

Peerage of Ireland
Preceded by Clotworthy Skeffington	Earl of Massereene; 1757–1805	Succeeded by Henry Skeffington
