= Clotworthy Skeffington, 11th Viscount Massereene =

Anglo-Irish peer

Clotworthy John Eyre Skeffington, 11th Viscount Massereene (9 October 1842 – 26 June 1905) was an Anglo-Irish peer.

He was the son of John Skeffington, 10th Viscount Massereene and Olivia Grady. He inherited his father's titles in the Peerage of Ireland in 1863. He served as Lord Lieutenant of Louth between 13 November 1879 and March 1898. He served in the Antrim Militia Artillery at Carrickfergus Castle, which had been commanded by his father, and was promoted to Lieutenant-Colonel Commandant himself on 20 November 1872.

He married Florence Elizabeth Whyte-Melville, daughter of George Whyte-Melville on 4 October 1870. He was succeeded in his titles by his second son, Algernon Skeffington, as his eldest son, Oriel, had died in April 1905.

Peerage of Ireland
Preceded by John Skeffington	Viscount Massereene; 1863–1905	Succeeded by Algernon Skeffington
Preceded by John Skeffington	Viscount Ferrard; 1863–1905	Succeeded by Algernon Skeffington
