= High Sheriff of Antrim =

Judicial representative in County Antrim

The High Sheriff of Antrim is the Sovereign's judicial representative in County Antrim. Initially an office for lifetime, assigned by the Sovereign, the high sheriff became annually appointed from the Provisions of Oxford in 1258. Besides his judicial importance, he has ceremonial and administrative functions and executes High Court Writs.

== History ==
The first (High) Shrivalties were established before the Norman Conquest in 1066 and date back to Saxon times. In 1908, an Order in Council made the Lord-Lieutenant the Sovereign's prime representative in a county and reduced the High Sheriff's precedence. Despite however that the office retains his responsibilities for the preservation of law and order in a county.

While the office of High Sheriff ceased to exist in those Irish counties, which had formed the Irish Free State in 1922, it is still present in the counties of Northern Ireland.

== Medieval ==
- 1326: John Athy

== James I, 1603–1625 ==
- 1603: Thomas Pavell
- 1613: Hugh Clotworthy
- 1618: Sir Hugh Clotworthy
- 1622: Sir Hugh Clotworthy

== Charles I, 1625–1649 ==
- 1625: Moses Hill
- 1626: Neal Oge O'Neill
- 1627: Cormick O'Hara
- 1628: William Houston
- 1629: Alexander MacDonnell
- 1630: Robert Adair
- 1631: Arthur O'Neill
- 1632: Alexander Stuart
- 1633: John Donaldson
- 1634: Arthur Hill
- 1635: Edward Maxwell
- 1636: John Dalway

== English Interregnum, 1649–1660 ==
- 1656: Roger Lyndon
- 1659: John Upton

== Charles II, 1660–1685 ==
- 1660: John Shaw
- 1661: Hercules Langford
- 1662: Alexander Dalway
- 1663: Thomas Warrin
- 1664: Richard Dobbs
- 1665: John Donaldson
- 1666: Anthony Horsman
- 1667: Francis Stafford
- 1668: Patrick Agnew
- 1669: Archibald Edmonston
- 1670: Sir Robert Colville
- 1671: George Maccartney
- 1672: William Upton
- 1673: Thadeus O'Hara
- 1674: John Galland
- 1675: Randall Bryce
- 1676: William Huston
- 1677: William Lesley
- 1678: Edward Harrison
- 1679: Henry Spencer
- 1680: Randall Smith
- 1681: George Macartney
- 1682: John Bickerstaffe
- 1683: John Bickerstaffe † / succeeded by Charles Stuart
- 1684: Henry Davys

== James II, 1685–1688 ==
- 1685: Thomas Knox
- 1686: Cormick O'Neill
- 1687: Cormick O'Neill
- 1688: Shane O'Neill

== William III, 1689–1702 ==
- 1689: Shane O'Neill
- 1690: Isaac MacCartney
- 1691: Thomas Smith
- 1692: Thomas Smith
- 1693: William Shaw
- 1694: Richard Dobbs
- 1695: Clotworthy Upton
- 1696: Sir Robert Adair
- 1697: Michael Harrison
- 1698: Edmond Ellis
- 1699: Andrew Clements
- 1700: John O'Neill
- 1701: John Davys

== Anne, 1702–1714 ==
- 1702: Benjamin Galland
- 1703: Charles O'Neill
- 1704: Brent Spencer
- 1705: John Davys
- 1706: Westerna Warring
- 1707: Edward Clements
- 1708: Benjamin Galland
- 1709: Arthur Davys
- 1710: William Shaw
- 1711: Andrew Clements
- 1712: Westerna Warring
- 1713: Brent Spencer

== George I, 1714–1727 ==
- 1714: Robert Green
- 1715: Edmund T. Stafford
- 1716: Edward Clements
- 1717: James Hamilton
- 1718: William Moore
- 1719: Hercules Upton
- 1720: Arthur Dobbs
- 1721: Francis Clements
- 1722: Henry O'Hara
- 1723: William Johnston
- 1724: Ezekiel William Crombie
- 1725: Ezekiel Davys Wiilson
- 1726: Sir Robert Adair

== George II, 1727–1760 ==
- 1727: Rowley Hill
- 1728: John Skeffington
- 1729: Charles O'Neill
- 1730: Valentine Jones
- 1731: Alexander Stuart
- 1732: John Moore
- 1733: Hector McNeill
- 1734: Hugh Boyd
- 1735: John Houston
- 1736: Clotworthy O'Neill
- 1737: Hill Wilson
- 1738: Edward Smith
- 1739: Davys Wilson
- 1740: William Boyd
- 1741: Conway Spencer
- 1742: Felix O'Neill
- 1743: George Macartney
- 1744: William Agnew
- 1745: Charles MacDaniel
- 1746: John Cuppage
- 1747: Edmund MacNaghten
- 1748: Edward Brice
- 1749: Roger MacNeill
- 1750: Roger Moore
- 1751: John Dunkin
- 1752: Conway Richard Dobbs
- 1753: Robert Adair
- 1754: Bernard O'Neill
- 1755: John Rowan
- 1756: John MacNaghten
- 1757: Arthur Upton
- 1758: Charles O'Hara
- 1759: James Leslie

== George III, 1760–1820 ==
- 1760: Richard Magenis
- 1761: Alexander Boyd
- 1762: Alexander Stuart
- 1763: John Henry
- 1764: Rowley Heylands
- 1765: Charles Hamilton
- 1766: Alexander MacAuley
- 1767: Sampson Moore
- 1768: Thomas Thomson
- 1769: Bryan MacManus
- 1770: Alexander Legge
- 1771: Randal William MacDonnell, Viscount Dunluce
- 1772: John O'Neill
- 1773: Hugh Boyd
- 1774: St John O'Neill
- 1775: Robert Morris Jones † / succeeded by Samuel Bristow
- 1776: Ezekiel Davies Boyd
- 1777: William Dunkin
- 1778: William Moore
- 1779: Robert Rowan
- 1780: William Legge
- 1781: Bartholomew MacNaghten
- 1782: Alexander MacManus
- 1783: John Brown
- 1784: John Crombie
- 1785: Henry O'Hara
- 1786: John Allen
- 1787: Robert Gage
- 1788: Henry W. Shaw
- 1789: Charles Crymble
- 1790: Samuel Allen
- 1791: Richard Gervais Kerr
- 1792: Hugh Boyd
- 1793: Edmund Alexander Macnaghten
- 1794: Roger Moore
- 1795: Stewart Banks
- 1796: James Watson
- 1797: Hon. Chichester Skeffington
- 1798: James Stewart Moore
- 1799: James Leslie
- 1800: George A. MacCleverty
- 1801: Thomas Benjamin Adair
- 1802: Langford Heylands
- 1803: Edward Jones-Agnew
- 1804: Hugh Montgomery
- 1805: Sir Henry Vane-Tempest, 2nd Bt
- 1806: Hon. John Bruce O'Neill
- 1807: Francis MacNaghten
- 1808: William Moore
- 1809: Stephen Moore
- 1810: Ezekiel Boyd
- 1811: James Caulfield
- 1812: John Campbell
- 1813: George Bristow
- 1814: John Rowan
- 1815: James Agnew Farrell
- 1816: Robert Thompson
- 1817: Samuel Thompson
- 1818: Hon. Thomas Henry Skeffington
- 1819: John Montgomery

== George IV, 1820–1830 ==
- 1820: Edmund MacDonald
- 1821: John Cromie
- 1822: Hon. Hercules Robert Pakenham
- 1823: William Wallace Legge
- 1824: Francis Turnley
- 1825: George Hutchinson of Ballymoney
- 1826: Alexander MacManus
- 1827: John McCance
- 1828: Cunningham Gregg
- 1829: Nicholas de la Cherois-Crommelin

== William IV, 1830–1837 ==
- 1830: Richard Magennis
- 1831: George H. Macartney of Lissanoure Castle
- 1832: Alexander McNeill
- 1833: Charles O'Hara
- 1834: David Kerr
- 1835: Hugh Leckey of Beardiville
- 1836: Edward Bruce of Scoutbush

== Victoria, 1837–1901 ==
- 1837: Edmund C. MacNaghten
- 1838: James Owens
- 1839: James Agnew
- 1840: T. Gregg
- 1841: Conway Richard Dobbs
- 1842: Alexander Henry Haliday
- 1843: John MacNeill
- 1844: John MacGildowney
- 1845: John White
- 1846: Thomas Morres Hamilton Jones of Moneyglass House
- 1847: William Moore
- 1848: Charles MacGarel
- 1849: James Stewart Moore
- 1850: Alexander Montgomery
- 1851: James Thomson Tennant
- 1852: Robert Smyth
- 1853: Robert Alexander Shafto Adair, 1st Baron Waveney
- 1854: James Edmund Leslie
- 1855: Ambrose O'Rorke
- 1856: Robert Grimshaw
- 1857: David Stewart Ker of Montalto
- 1858: Andrew Mulholland of Springvale, Ballywalter
- 1859: George Gray
- 1860: Henry Hugh McNeile
- 1861: Henry H. H. O'Hara
- 1862: Frederick Hugh Henry
- 1863: John Young
- 1864:
- 1865:
- 1866: William Thomas Bristow Lyons
- 1867: Robert James Montgomery
- 1868: Richard Henry Magenis
- 1869: William Coates
- 1870: Robert James Montgomery
- 1871: Henry Adair
- 1872:
- 1873: James Chaine
- 1874: Thomas Casement
- 1875: Robert Jackson Alexander, J.P., Portglenone House, Ballymena
- 1876: Sir Charles Lanyon
- 1877: Sir Francis Edmund Workman-Macnaghten, 3rd Baronet
- 1878: James Owens
- 1879: Edmund McNeill
- 1880: James Stewart-Moore
- 1881: John Casement
- 1882:
- 1883: Ogilvie Blair Graham
- 1884: Anthony Traill
- 1885: Thomas Montgomery
- 1886: Samuel Allen
- 1887: Henry Cole Magenis
- 1888: Montagu William Edward Dobbs
- 1889: James Sinclair Cramsie
- 1890: William Moore
- 1891: James Macaulay
- 1892: George Edmondstone Kirk
- 1893: Victor Coates of Rathmore, Dunmurry
- 1894:
- 1895: Harold William Stannus Gray
- 1896:
- 1897: Sir William Quartus Ewart, 2nd Bt
- 1898: William James Pirrie
- 1899: Hugh Houston Smiley
- 1900: George Johnston Preston

== Edward VII, 1901–1910 ==
- 1901: Robert Henry Sturrock Reade
- 1902: William Chaine
- 1903: Thomas Hugh Torrens
- 1904: William Henry Holmes Lyons
- 1905: John Milne Barbour
- 1906: Hercules Arthur Pakenham
- 1907: James Graham Leslie
- 1908: Sir William Grey Ellison-Macartney
- 1909: Archibald Edward Dobbs
- 1910: John Alexander Montgomery

== George V, 1910–1936 ==
- 1911: Robert Peel Dawson Spencer Chichester
- 1912: Sir Thomas James Dixon, 2nd Bt
- 1913: Edward Johnson Charley
- 1914:
- 1915:
- 1916: Sir William Thompson Adair
- 1917: John Johnston Kirkpatrick
- 1918:
- 1919:
- 1920:
- 1921: Arthur Frederick Dobbs
- 1922: Charles Lewis MacKean
- 1923: Sir Francis Alexander Macnaghten, 8th Baronet
- 1924: Thomas Kelly Evans Johnston
- 1925: James Love McFerran
- 1926: James Young
- 1927: Robert Arthur Alexander
- 1928: St Clair Mulholland Dobbs
- 1929: William Stewart Traill
- 1930: Hugh Lecky
- 1931: Sir William Frederick Coates, 1st Bt
- 1932: Sydney James Lyle
- 1933: Arthur O'Neill Cubitt Chichester
- 1934: Sir Robert William Hugh O'Neill, 1st Bt
- 1935: Godfrey William Ferguson
- 1936: John Alexander James Montgomery

== George VI, 1936–1952 ==
- 1937: James Stewart Moore
- 1938: Robert Christopher Alexander
- 1939: Anthony O'Brien Traill
- 1940: Sir George Ernest Clark, 2nd Bt
- 1941: David Cecil Lindsay
- 1942: John Dermot Campbell
- 1943: Sydney Adam McNeill
- 1944: William Samson Moore
- 1945: William Litton Rowland De Burgh Young
- 1946: Arthur Cochran Herdman
- 1947: Henry Adair Allen
- 1948: Edward Stanley Clarke
- 1949: Archibald Gordon Edward Turnley
- 1950: Alexander James Henry Cramsie of O'harabrook, Ballymoney
- 1951: Francis Casement

== Elizabeth II, 1952–2022 ==
- 1952: Hugh Cameron McGildowney
- 1953: Terence O'Neill, Baron O'Neill of the Maine
- 1954: Sir George Clark, 3rd Baronet
- 1955: Samuel Gillmor Haughton
- 1956: Robert Henry Reade
- 1957: George Burrell MacKean
- 1958: Phelim O'Neill, 2nd Baron Rathcavan
- 1959: Ralph Pethebridge Martin
- 1960: John William Frazer
- 1961: Martin Edward Harcourt Mulholland
- 1962: Redmond Rochfort Young
- 1963: John Young
- 1964: William Roger Clotworthy Moore
- 1965: Robert Simpson Hanson
- 1966: Sir Antony MacNaghten, 10th Bt
- 1967: James Francis Leslie
- 1968: John O'Neill McClintock
- 1969: Sir Robert George Caldwell Kinahan
- 1970: Hugh James Montgomery
- 1971: Charles Henry Grierson Kinahan
- 1972: Anthony Kenneth Frazer
- 1973: Alec Cooke, Baron Cooke of Islandreagh
- 1974: Arthur Henry Bates
- 1975: Frank Bryan Savage Maclaran
- 1976: Sir William Ivan Cecil Ewart, 6th Bt
- 1977: Josias Cunningham Junior
- 1978: William Hunter Robert Charley
- 1979: William Denis Grenville Mackie of Lissanoure Castle
- 1980: Richard Severn Traill
- 1981: John Michael Ross
- 1982: William David Boyle Vandeleur
- 1983: Robin Dixon, 3rd Baron Glentoran
- 1984: J. P. Cooke
- 1985: P. C. D. Campbell
- 1986:
- 1987:
- 1988:
- 1989: Sandy Cramsie
- 1990:
- 1991: M. D. Stewart-Moore
- 1992: Richard G. Reade
- 1993: P. D. Cooke
- 1994: Andrew David Frazer
- 1995: John H. H. Stewart
- 1996: Daniel de Burgh Kinahan
- 1997: Richard Francis Andrew Dobbs
- 1998: Ronald Conway
- 1999: Pamela Traill
- 2000: Patricia Elise MacCarthy-Morrogh
- 2001: John Weir Wallace
- 2002: Michael John Alexander Cooke
- 2003: Hugh Edward John Montgomery
- 2004: Sheelagh Elizabeth Hillan
- 2005: David John Reade
- 2006: James Seymour Leslie
- 2007: Joseph Wilson
- 2008: Lady Juliet C. Frazer
- 2009: Nigel Dobbs
- 2010: Steven Montgomery
- 2011: David Severn Traill of Bushmills
- 2012: Julia Elizabeth Shirley of Larne
- 2013: Mervyn G Rankin of Portglenone
- 2014: Shane O'Neill of Shanes Castle
- 2015: John Pinkerton of Ballymoney
- 2016: James Ernest Perry of Ballymena
- 2017: Miranda Tisdale, DL of Muckamore
- 2018: Gillian May Bingham of Ballyclare
- 2019: James Ronald Hassard of Ballyclare
- 2020: Rupert Cramsie of O’Harabrook
- 2021: Susan Jane Pinkerton of Ballymoney
- 2022: John Anthony Lockett of Lisburn

== Charles III, 2022–present ==
- 2023: Peter Thomas Watts Mackie, of Lissanoure Castle

== See also ==
- The Antrim Lieutenancy Website

== Notes ==
† Died in office
