= Clotworthy O'Neill =

Irish politician

Clotworthy O'Neill (1688 – buried 26 July 1749) was an Irish politician and member of the O'Neill dynasty of Clandeboye.

O'Neill was born in 1688 at Shane's Castle, the third son of Shane An Frankagh O'Neill (also known as French John) and Charity Dixon. He had two brothers, Henry (died 1721) and Charles, and sisters Cathrine, Mary, Jane, Rachel, Elinor, Rose and Anne. His brother Charles, Member of Parliament for Randalstown, married Cathrine Broderick, daughter of St John Broderick, and was the father of John O'Neill, 1st Viscount O'Neill and grandfather of Charles O'Neill, 1st Earl O'Neill.

Clotworthy was educated at Trinity College, Dublin and left in 1746. He was MP for Randalstown in County Antrim from 1746 to 1749.

He died in Bath, Somerset and was buried at Bath Abbey. He died unmarried and his only surviving brother, Charles, inherited the family's considerable estates at Shane's Castle. His death notice lamented Clotworthy as "always remarkable for Acts of Generosity, Candor and Probity, an exceeding good Magistrate and Landlord, a great Friend to the Distressed, and to the Poor in particular, his Death is universally lamented by all manner of Persons in the Kingdom, who had the Pleasure of his Acquaintance."
