= Sir John Lees, 1st Baronet =

Irish black rod

Coordinates: 53.289901°N 6.150617°W

John Lees
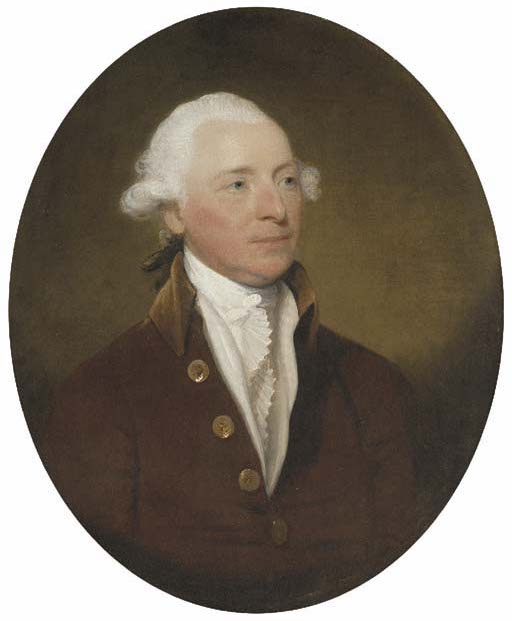
- Sir John Lees portrait by Gilbert Stuart painted between 1787 and 1793
- Born: 1737
- Died: September 3, 1811 (aged 73–74); Blackrock, Dublin
- Burial place: Carrickbrennan Churchyard
- Occupations: under-secretary of the War Department in Ireland Secretary of the Irish Post Office Black Rod in Ireland
- Years active: 1767–1811
- Children: 7, including Harcourt and Edward

Sir John Lees, 1st Baronet (c. 1737– 3 September 1811) was Secretary of the Irish Post Office.

== Family ==
John Lees was born about 1737, probably at Cumnock in Ayrshire, the son of Adam Lees and his wife Agnes Goldie. He married Mary, the eldest daughter of Robert Cathcart of Glandusk, and together they had six sons: Harcourt Lees (born 1 October 1777), 2nd Baronet, John Cathcart, barrister-at-law, Townsend (born 3 August 1779), Edward Smith Lees (born 30 March 1783), joint secretary, with his father, in the Irish Post Office and later, in Scotland, as secretary to the Postmaster General for Scotland, William Eden (born 5 August 1784), Thomas Orde (born 3 Jun 1788) They also had a daughter, Charlotte, though Bayley Butler mentions two daughters and observes that Lees son's are named after people connected to his life.

Lees' wife, Mary, died suddenly in November 1805 and he died on 3 November 1811. The Gentleman's Magazine wrote that Lees was worth £250,000 at his death though other sources suggest £100,000. Unfortunately, his will was destroyed during the Four Courts fire in 1922. The family are buried in Carrickbrennan Churchyard, and there is a mural tablet to his memory in Monkstown Church.

== Career ==
Lees served with distinction in an administrative capacity in the British Army in Germany under the command of the Marquis of Granby during the Seven Years' War. He was employed in 1767 as a secretary by The Marquess Townshend when the latter was appointed Lord Lieutenant of Ireland and continued in the same post for his successor, the first Earl Harcourt.

In 1774 he was appointed Secretary of the Post Office in Ireland for the first time which was hardly more than a sinecure by paying John Walcot, his predecessor an annuity and paying £812 to Walcot's predecessor, Barham. That position only lasted until 1781 when he was promoted to under-secretary of the War Department in Ireland. In October 1780 he accepted the post of Usher of the Black Rod in the Irish House of Lords, but had relinquished it by the time the Lords next met in October 1781.

Lees second tenure as secretary to the Irish Post Office was officially made in 1784 and lasted until his death in 1811. Between him and his fourth son Edward Smith, who at the age of 18, by a patent dated 23 March 1801, was jointly appointed with his father as Secretary of the Irish Post Office, they essentially administered the Irish post office for almost 50 years. Father and son were rather enterprising in their post office work, such as encouraging improvements to the post roads and a better Penny Post system, opening new letter offices, they organised more frequent postal deliveries, and introduced mail coaches on all the main roads in Ireland. Lees also developed the mail boat system by starting an express service over the Irish Sea that his friends supplemented by using the service.

Their control was mainly due to the system whereby they were accountable only to the joint Postmasters General of Ireland, who being nobles were infrequently involved in the day-to-day running of the organisation. They were seldom seen together and a single signatures was required for any authorisation, unlike the signature of both Postmasters General in London.

Despite the improvements made, there was much fraud and corruption within the post office. While Lees salary of £432 was supplemented by £1,500 by the distribution of newspapers and appointments.

In 1788 he was elected a member of the Dublin Society proposed by Sir William Newcomen and Lodge Morres. He was a Protestant conservative and an ally of Speaker Foster's in demanding severe punishments during the 1798 rebellion.

On 30 September 1800 Lees was presented with his freedom of the city of Cork in a silver box.

His son, Edward Smith Lees, solely held the position in his own right upon his father's death until he was transferred to the same position in Edinburgh, following investigations and reports into fraud and mismanagement in Ireland.

== Blackrock House ==
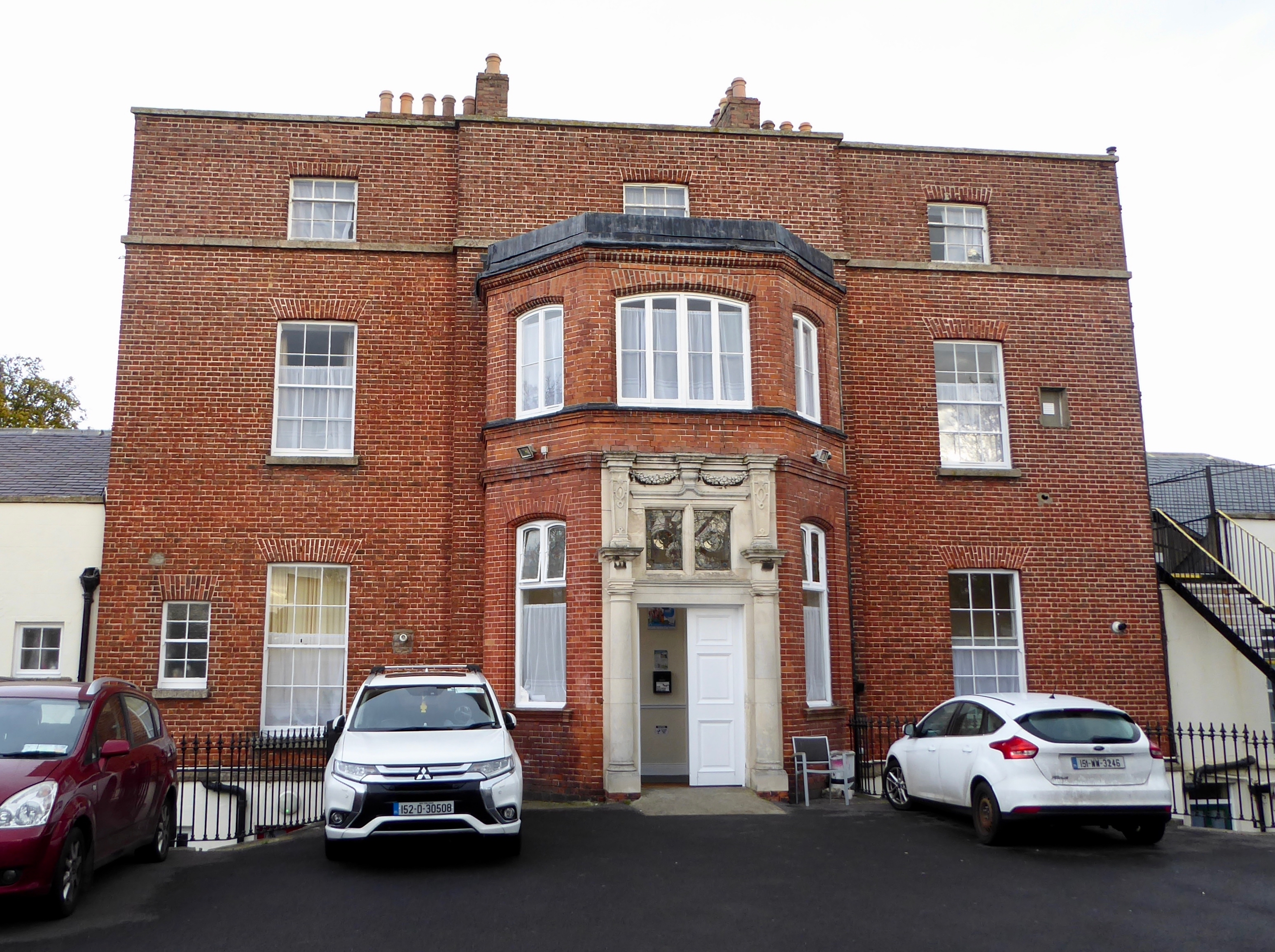
Blackrock House in November 2021

He became wealthy and acquired several parcels of sea-front land ranging from 50 ft x 50 ft to 19 acres, between Maretimo House, Lord Cloncurry's house, in Blackrock, a Dublin suburb, and the Martello Tower at Seapoint. In 1774 Lees built Blackrock House, one of the few 18th-century mansions built with red brick and with some fine features such as a two-storey red brick porch, a large coach-house, stable yard and gate-lodge. The house is still standing, although currently divided into flats. The building was described thus in 1825 by his eldest brother Harcourt Lees:

It stands in a beautiful situation at the upper end of the town. There is something heavy however in the external appearance of the place, the lofty gates lined with sheet iron, trebly barred and closed at all hours indicating something like fear or uneasiness in the mind of the man who deems them necessary.

In 1785 when the balloonist Richard Crosbie flew from the Duke of Leinster's lawn he came down in the sea and when rescued by the Dunleary barge was landed at Blackrock House. Crosbie was entertained by Lord Rutland, the Lord Lieutenant of Ireland, who rented the house as his temporary summer residence. The house was therefore sometimes known as Rutland House or the Lord Lieutenant's Lodge. Other frequent visitors were distinguished people and nobility, such as the Marquis of Buckingham, who like Lord Rutland was a Lord Lieutenant of Ireland.

A more tragic event took place in mid-November 1807 when two troop ships sunk in Dublin Bay. They were carrying troops bound for the Napoleonic Wars and were caught in gale-force winds and heavy snow after leaving Dublin Port. The storm carried them south as far a Bray Head and back north to Dunleary. Later a longboat was launched with the master, the captain Robert Jones, seamen and passengers when the ship was wrecked off Sir John's house. Thirty-seven troops from the packet boat Prince of Wales were drowned nearby and it has been suggested the men may have been deliberately locked below deck while the ship's captain and crew escaped. The captain was imprisoned but no trial account was found. The bodies from the shipwreck were recovered and laid out for the inquest in the coach house of Blackrock House and buried in the small Merrion Graveyard, in Booterstown.

Upon Lees' death his eldest son, Harcourt Lees inherited Blackrock House and in turn his son, also called John Lees became its owner. The Kingstown extension to the Dublin and Kingstown Railway, completed in 1837, ran along the seafront of the property, but houses have been built on a more recent street, Maretimo Gardens East, between the rear of the house and the railway.

== Baronage ==
On 23 June 1804 he was created a Baronet 'of Blackrock in the County of Dublin'. He was succeeded by his eldest son Harcourt, a well-known anti-catholic political pamphleteer.

Coat of arms of Sir John Lees, 1st Baronet
Crest A dexter hand couped above the wrist and erect Proper grasping a crescent Or. Escutcheon Azure a fess chequy Argent and Sable between six cross-crosslets fitchée three in the chief and three in the nombril points Or and three billets two in the honour and one in the base points of the second. Motto Exegi; An Honest Man’s The Noblest Work of God.

== See also ==
- Lees baronets

Baronetage of the United Kingdom
New creation	Baronet (of Blackrock); 1804–1811	Succeeded by Harcourt Lees
