= Timothy Armitage =

Timothy Armitage may refer to:

- Timothy Armitage (minister) (died 1655), English clergyman
- Timothy Armitage (politician) (1675–1715), Irish politician
