= Postmaster general =

Chief executive officer of the postal service of a country

A Postmaster General, in Anglosphere countries and in the Thurn-und-Taxis Post, is the chief executive officer of the postal service of that country, a ministerial office responsible for overseeing all other postmasters.

== History ==
The practice of having a government official responsible for overseeing the delivery of mail throughout the nation originated in England. A 'Master of the Posts' is mentioned in the King's Book of Payments, with a payment of £100 being authorised for Sir Brian Tuke as 'Master of the King's Post' in February 1512. In 1517, he was appointed to the office of 'Governor of the King's Posts', a precursor to the office of Postmaster General of the United Kingdom, by Henry VIII. In 1609, it was decreed that letters could only be carried and delivered by persons authorised by the Postmaster General.

In the United Kingdom, the office of Postmaster General was abolished in 1969. It was replaced by the Minister of Posts and Telecommunications. In 2000, its functions were transferred to the Secretary of State at the Department of Trade and Industry (DTI).

== International ==
International equivalents include:

Jurisdiction	Official title	Years
Scotland	Postmaster General for Scotland	1616–1707
United States	United States Postmaster General	1775–present
Ireland	Postmaster-General of Ireland	1784–1831
Sri Lanka	Postmaster General of Sri Lanka	1815–present
New Zealand	Postmaster-General of New Zealand	1858–1989
Hong Kong	Postmaster General of Hong Kong	1860–present
Canada	Postmaster General of Canada	1867–1981
Australia	Postmaster-General of Australia	1901–1975
