= Viscount O'Neill =

Irish peerage title, extinct in 1855

Viscount O'Neill, of Shane's Castle in the County of Antrim, was a title in the Peerage of Ireland. It was created in 1795 for John O'Neill, 1st Baron O'Neill, who had earlier represented Randalstown and County Antrim in the Irish House of Commons. He had already been created Baron O'Neill, of Shane's Castle in the County of Antrim, in 1793, also in the Peerage of Ireland. He died in 1798 and was succeeded by his son, the second Viscount. In 1800 he was created Viscount Raymond and Earl O'Neill in the Peerage of Ireland. The same year he was elected as one of the original 28 Irish representative peer. The viscountcy of Raymond and earldom became extinct on his death in 1841. The barony and viscountcy of O'Neill were passed on to his only brother, the third Viscount. These titles became extinct on the latter's death in 1855. The late Viscount's estates were inherited by his cousin, the Reverend William Chichester, who assumed the surname of O'Neill in lieu of Chichester the same year. In 1868, the O'Neill title was revived when he was created Baron O'Neill. This title is still extant.

The family seat was Shane's Castle, County Antrim.

== Baron O'Neill (1793) ==
- John O'Neill, 1st Baron O'Neill (1740–1798) (created Viscount O'Neill in 1795)

=== Viscount O'Neill (1795) ===
- John O'Neill, 1st Viscount O'Neill (1740–1798)
- Charles Henry St John O'Neill, 2nd Viscount O'Neill (1779–1841) (created Earl O'Neill in 1800)

=== Earl O'Neill (1800) ===
- Charles Henry St John O'Neill, 1st Earl O'Neill (1779–1841)

=== Viscount O'Neill (1795; reverted) ===
- John Bruce Richard O'Neill, 3rd Viscount O'Neill (1780–1855)

== See also ==
- Baron O'Neill
