= James St John Jeffereyes =

Anglo-Irish soldier, landowner and politician

Member of Parliament for Midleton
- In office 1758–1776
- Preceded by: William Annesley, James Hamilton
- Succeeded by: Thomas Brodrick, Henry Brodrick

Member of Parliament for Randalstown
- In office 1776–1780
- Preceded by: St John O'Neill, John O'Neill
- Succeeded by: Lord Rawdon, John O'Neill

Personal details
- Born: 1734 Ireland
- Died: September 14, 1780 Ireland
- Spouse: Arabella Fitzgibbon
- Relations: Sir James Jeffreys (grandfather); St John Brodrick (grandfather); John FitzGibbon, 1st Earl of Clare (brother-in-law)
- Children: George Jeffereyes, Mary Anne Jeffereyes (and three other daughters)
- Parent(s): James Jeffreys and Anne Brodrick
- Education: Trinity College Dublin (did not graduate)
- Occupation: Soldier, landowner, politician

Military service
- Service: British Army
- Rank: Major
- Unit: 24th Regiment of Foot
- Position: Lieutenant-Governor of Cork (1768–1769)

James St John Jeffereyes (1734 – 14 September 1780), also recorded as St John Jeffreys, was an Anglo-Irish soldier, landowner and politician.

== Biography ==
Jeffereyes was the son of the diplomat James Jeffreys and Anne Brodrick, and the grandson of Sir James Jeffreys and St John Brodrick. He entered Trinity College Dublin on 12 February 1752, but did not graduate and instead joined the British Army. By 1766 he had attained the rank of major in the 24th Regiment of Foot and he served as Lieutenant-Governor of Cork from 1768 to 1769.

Between 1758 and 1776, Jeffereyes sat in the Irish House of Commons as the Member of Parliament for Midleton, before representing Randalstown from 1776 until his death in 1780. In Parliament, Jeffereyes was an opponent of Richard Boyle, 2nd Earl of Shannon, the local magnate. In 1778 Jeffreys supported the popery bill granting Irish Roman Catholics greater property rights; Shannon opposed it.

Jeffereyes was noted for his work as a reforming landlord on his Blarney Castle estate. During the 1760s and 1770s he spent over £8,000 as loans to manufacturers or in building premises on the estate which he then leased out to encourage economic activity. He invested in improvement works, including housing for workers and water power for local industry. He granted favourable leases to residents and encouraged textile printers to come from Dublin to set up in his village; the thirteen factories on his estate in 1776 included a linen tape factory, a tuck mill, and a leather works.

He married Arabella Fitzgibbon, sister of John FitzGibbon, 1st Earl of Clare. They had one son, George, and four daughters, including Mary Anne, whose first marriage to George Nugent, 7th Earl of Westmeath ended in a scandalous divorce in 1796.

Parliament of Ireland
Preceded by William Annesley; James Hamilton	Member of Parliament for Midleton; 1758–1776; With: William Annesley (1758–1759); Francis Andrews (1759–1761); Thomas Brodrick (1761–1768); Edward Brodrick (1768–1776)	Succeeded by Thomas Brodrick; Henry Brodrick
Preceded by St John O'Neill; John O'Neill	Member of Parliament for Randalstown; 1776–1780; With: John O'Neill	Succeeded by Lord Rawdon; John O'Neill
