= Lord O'Neill =

Lord O'Neill may refer to:

- Baron O'Neill, a title in the Peerage of the United Kingdom created in 1868
- Viscount O'Neill, a title in the Peerage of Ireland created in 1795
- Earl O'Neill, a title in the Peerage of Ireland created in 1800
- Martin O'Neill, Baron O'Neill of Clackmannan (1945–2020), Scottish politician
- Jim O'Neill, Baron O'Neill of Gatley (born 1957), British economist
- Terence O'Neill, Baron O'Neill of the Maine (1914–1990), Prime Minister of Northern Ireland from 1963 to 1969

== See also ==
- Baroness O'Neill (disambiguation)
- O'Neill baronets
- O'Neill dynasty
