= Thomas Brodrick =

Thomas Brodrick may refer to:

- Thomas Brodrick (1654–1730), Irish MP
- Thomas Brodrick (Royal Navy officer) (died 1769), British naval officer

== See also ==
- Brodrick Thomas (disambiguation)
