= George Nugent, 7th Earl of Westmeath =

Anglo-Irish politician (1760–1814)

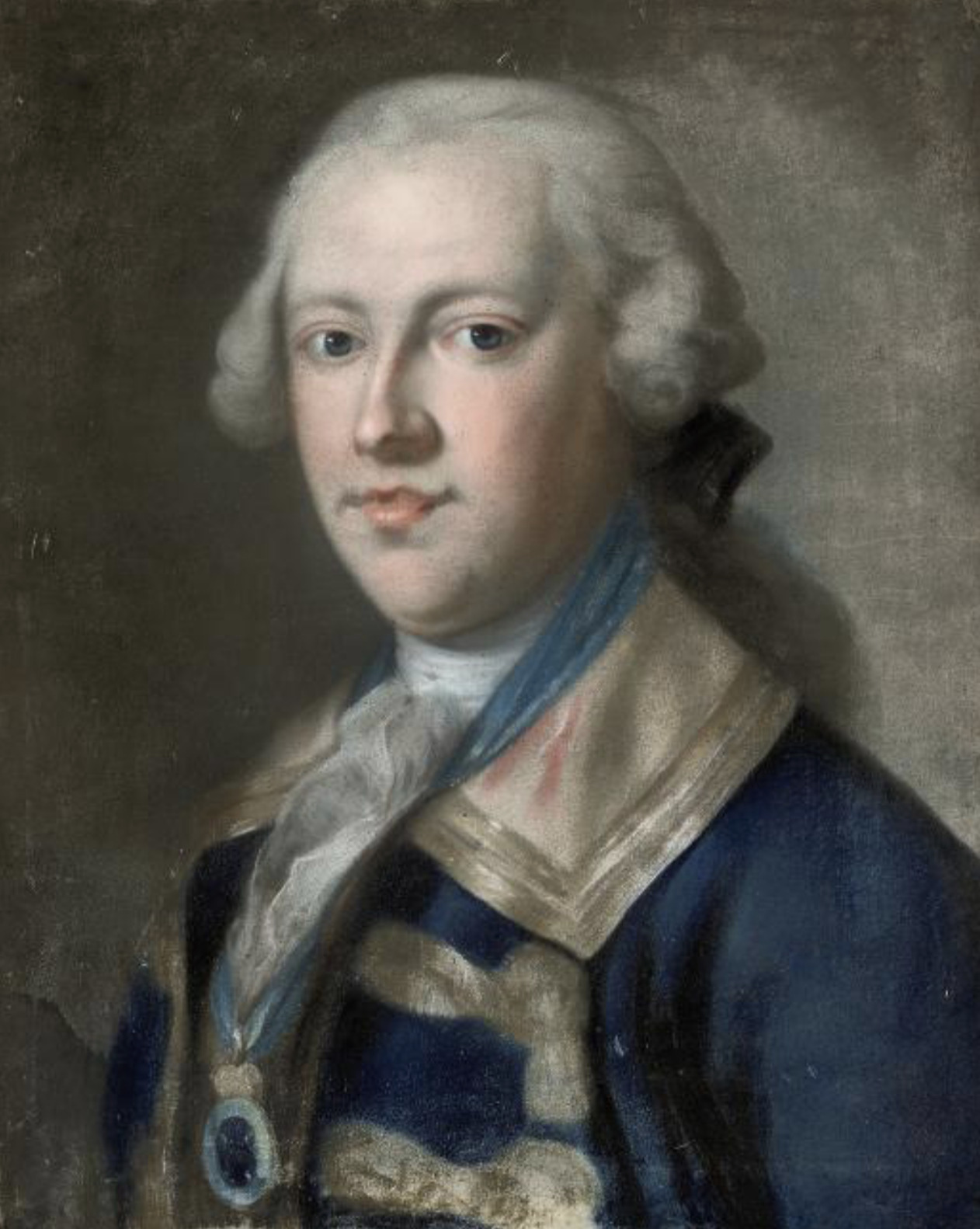
Possible portrait attributed to François-Xavier Vispré

George Frederick Nugent, 7th Earl of Westmeath, PC (Ire) (18 November 1760 – 30 December 1814), styled Lord Delvin from 1760 to 1792, was an Anglo-Irish politician who represented Fore in the Irish House of Commons from 1780 to 1792. He gained notoriety in his own lifetime, due to his unhappy first marriage to Maryanne Jeffries, which ended in divorce following a much-publicised legal action by the husband for criminal conversation.

== Background and early career ==
Nugent was the only surviving son of Thomas Nugent, 6th Earl of Westmeath, by his second wife Catherine White, daughter of Henry White of Pitchfordstown, County Kildare. He sat in the Irish House of Commons as member for Fore from 1780 until 1792, when he succeeded his father in the earldom. He became a member of the Irish Privy Council the following year, and held the offices of Custos Rotulorum for Westmeath and Auditor of Foreign Accounts. He was appointed Colonel of the Westmeath Militia when it was first raised on 25 April 1793. In 1796 he was involved in suppressing a threatened rebellion, a prelude to the Irish rebellion of 1798.

== Marriage ==
As a young man, he was described as "gay, social and convivial". At the age of 24, he married Maryanne Jeffries (or Jeffreyes), who was about a year older. She was the daughter of Major James St John Jeffereyes of Blarney Castle and Arabella Fitzgibbon, daughter of John FitzGibbon and sister of John Fitzgibbon, 1st Earl of Clare. She was described as a young woman of "great beauty, education and high accomplishments" and was also wealthy. It was generally regarded as a love marriage, and according to the evidence from the criminal conversation action, the early years of the marriage were very happy. After about six years they parted, he living in Ireland, she in London. At an unknown date Maryanne became the lover of Augustus Cavendish-Bradshaw, younger son of Sir Henry Cavendish, 2nd Baronet and Sarah Cavendish, 1st Baroness Waterpark, and brother of Richard Cavendish, 2nd Baron Waterpark.

There is no reason to doubt the claim made by Lord Westmeath's counsel at the trial that he hesitated for a long time before deciding to end the marriage: divorce then invariably caused scandal, and the process was slow and expensive, requiring a private act of Parliament. Also, a cuckolded husband was traditionally a figure of fun, and his wife's infidelity did expose Westmeath to a good deal of ridicule, both among his neighbours and in the press. Even while exercising his official duties as a Colonel of Militia, when he accidentally entered the bedroom of a married woman, he was told pointedly that she (unlike some) was a virtuous wife. Although he was a rich man, financial motives may partly explain his decision to sue for criminal conversation, as he sought the (then) very large sum of £20,000 (on the other hand Cavendish-Bradshaw was notoriously short of money, and probably never paid the damages). In any case, a successful verdict in such a suit was then a necessary first step towards divorce, and he did ultimately decide on the dissolution of the marriage.

=== Civil action ===
The case opened on 20 February 1796, before Barry Yelverton, the Chief Baron of the Irish Exchequer. Each side had an impressive legal team: John Toler, the Solicitor General for Ireland and William Saurin, the future Attorney General for Ireland acting for the plaintiff faced John Philpot Curran acting for the defendant. The trial aroused enormous public interest and the courtroom was packed, while it also received a great deal of publicity in the press.

Five witnesses, all servants of the Westmeaths, testified to actions which amounted to strong if circumstantial evidence of adultery (it was not the practice then in a divorce suit for the husband, wife or alleged lover to give evidence). Curran's cross-examination is said to have afforded great entertainment to the public, but he did not seriously damage the witnesses' credit. His speech to the jury was praised for its eloquence, although he came close to admitting that adultery had been proved. On that basis he attacked the character of both husband and wife, describing Lady Westmeath as an experienced woman of the world who had seduced a much younger man. Lord Westmeath, he described as a pleasure-loving and neglectful husband. As he quite fairly pointed out the picture of a happy marriage destroyed by the intrigues of Bradshaw did not explain the awkward fact that the couple had led separate lives for years before Bradshaw arrived on the scene.

Curran's eloquence had little effect: Yelverton in his summing up described the evidence as overwhelming and suggested that the damages should be very large. The jury found for the plaintiff and awarded him £10,000. Whether he actually recovered the damages is unclear, as Bradshaw was a poor man all his life, who spent years lobbying each government in turn for any lucrative office which might be vacant, and was invariably refused.

=== Aftermath ===
Earl of Westmeath's Divorce Act 1797
- Act of Parliament
- Parliament of Ireland
- Long title: An Act to dissolve the marriage of George Frederick, earl of Westmeath, with Ann, countess of Westmeath, his now wife, and to enable him to marry again.
- Citation: 37 Geo. 3. c. 1 Pr. (I)
- Territorial extent: Ireland

Dates
- Royal assent: 7 November 1796

The Westmeaths were divorced by a private act of Parliament, the Earl of Westmeath's Divorce Act 1797 (37 Geo. 3. c. 1 Pr. (I)) later that year, and in November Maryanne and Bradshaw married. She long outlived both her husbands, dying in 1849, aged about 90. Bradshaw died in 1832, in relative poverty.

In 1797 Westmeath remarried Lady Elizabeth Moore, daughter of Charles Moore, 1st Marquess of Drogheda and Lady Anne Seymour-Conway. He supported the Act of Union 1800 and became an Irish representative peer. He died on 30 December 1814.

== Family ==
While the trial records refer to several children of the first marriage, we know definitely of only one son, George Nugent, 1st Marquess of Westmeath; the others presumably died young. There were five children in the second marriage, Robert, Thomas, Elizabeth, Catherine and Mary.

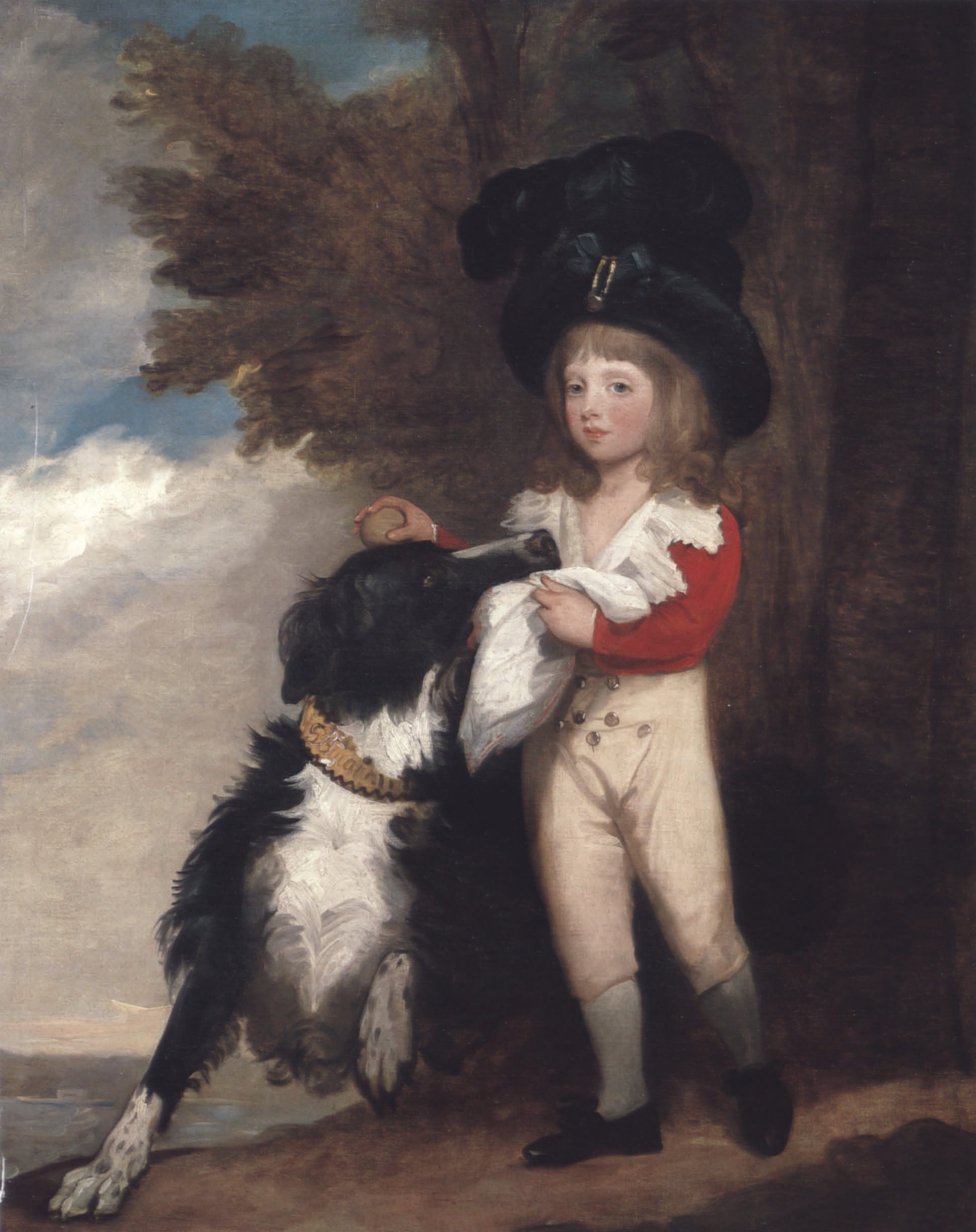
George, 1st Marquess of Westmeath as a child; portrait by Gilbert Stuart

The younger George's marital career was no happier than his parents' had been: two of his three marriages ended in divorce. His first wife, Lady Emily Cecil, recalled indignantly that her mother-in-law Maryanne had suggested that she, Emily, have an affair with the Duke of Wellington, to help her husband's career, which suggests that Maryanne had no regrets about her own infidelity to George's father.

George had no son, and as both his half-brothers, Robert and Thomas had predeceased him without issue, the Earldom passed to a cousin.

Parliament of Ireland
Preceded by James FitzGerald; Cornelius O'Keefe	Member of Parliament for Fore; 1780–1792; With: James FitzGerald 1780–1783; Gervase Parker Bushe 1783–1790; Stephen Francis William Fremantle 1790–1792	Succeeded by Stephen Francis William Fremantle; John Macartney
Parliament of the United Kingdom
New title	Representative peer for Ireland; 1800–1814	Succeeded by The Earl Mount Cashell
Peerage of Ireland
Preceded by Thomas Nugent	Earl of Westmeath; 1792–1814	Succeeded by George Nugent
