= Lees baronets of Blackrock (1804) =

Baronetcy

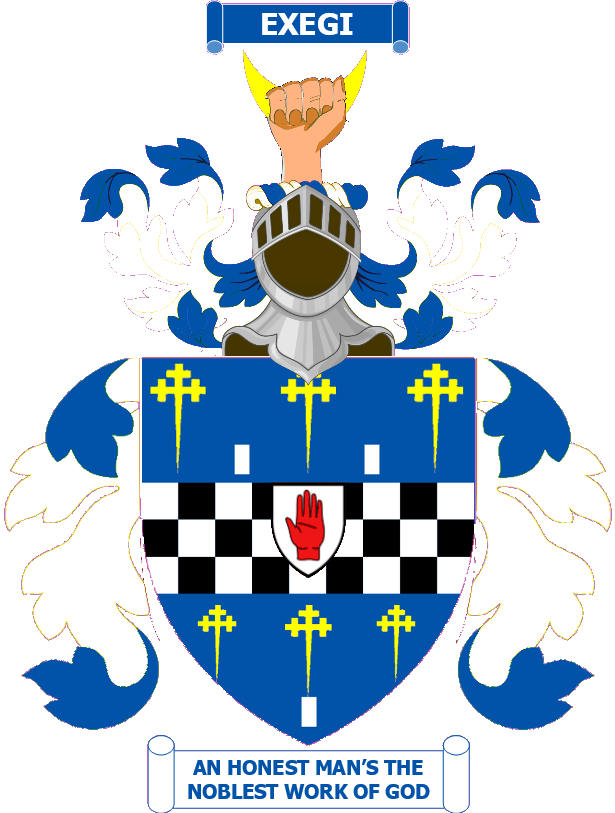
- Crest: A dexter hand couped above the wrist and erect Proper grasping a crescent Or.
- Shield: Azure a fess chequy Argent and Sable between six cross-crosslets fitchée three in the chief and three in the nombril points Or and three billets two in the honour and one in the base points of the second.
- Motto: Exegi; An Honest Man’s The Noblest Work of God.

The Lees Baronetcy, of Blackrock in the County of Dublin, was created in the Baronetage of the United Kingdom on 30 June 1804 for the soldier and politician John Lees.

== Lees baronets, of Blackrock (1804) ==
- Sir John Lees, 1st Baronet (1737–1811)
- Sir Harcourt Lees, 2nd Baronet (1776–1852)
- Sir John Lees, 3rd Baronet (1816–1892)
- Sir Harcourt James Lees, 4th Baronet (1840–1917)
- Sir Arthur Henry James Lees, 5th Baronet (1863–1949)
- Sir Jean Marie Ivor Lees, 6th Baronet (1875–1957)
- Sir Charles Archibald Edward Ivor Lees, 7th Baronet (1902–1963)
- Sir Thomas Harcourt Ivor Lees, 8th Baronet (born 1941)

The heir presumptive is the present holder's cousin Trevor John Cathcart d'Olier-Lees (born 1961).

== Notes ==
Baronetage of the United Kingdom
Preceded by Bruce baronets	Lees baronets of Blackrock; 30 June 1804	Succeeded by O'Malley baronets
