= Edward Berkeley =

Edward Berkeley may refer to:

- Edward Berkeley (died 1707) (ca. 1644 – 1707), MP for Wells
- Edward Berkeley (died 1596), MP for Old Sarum

== See also ==
- Edward Barclay (disambiguation)
