= Baroness O'Neill =

Baroness O'Neill may refer to:

- Onora O'Neill, Baroness O'Neill of Bengarve (born 1941), British philosopher
- Teresa O'Neill, Baroness O'Neill of Bexley, British Conservative politician

== See also ==
- Lord O'Neill (disambiguation)
