= Arthur Frederick Dobbs =

Arthur Frederick Dobbs (31 March 1876 – 16 February 1955) was a Unionist politician in Northern Ireland.

Born at Castle Dobbs, County Antrim, Dobbs studied at Wellington College, Berkshire, and King's College, Cambridge. He served with the Royal Engineers from 1898, and saw active service in the Second Boer War. He was appointed as lieutenant in the Harwich submarine division of the Royal Engineers Milita on 25 December 1901, and resigned on 4 March 1903. He subsequently was attached to the Antrim Royal Artillery 1907–1926.

During World War I, he served as a major with the Howitzer Battery. In 1921, he served as High Sheriff of Antrim. From 1929 to 1933, he was an Ulster Unionist Party member of the Senate of Northern Ireland; he was re-elected in 1937 and served until his death in 1955.
