= HMS Cumberland (1739) =

History

Great Britain
- Name: HMS Cumberland
- Acquired: 29 June 1739
- Renamed: Acquired as Alex Roberts
- Fate: Broken up in March 1742

General characteristics
- Type: Fireship
- Tons burthen: 181 13/94 bm
- Length: 79 ft (24 m) (gundeck); 62 ft 9.25 in (19.1326 m) (keel)
- Beam: 23 ft 3.5 in (7.099 m)
- Depth of hold: 11 ft 4 in (3.45 m)
- Complement: 45
- Armament: 8 × 6-pounder guns; 6 or 8 × ½-pounder swivels

HMS Cumberland was an 8-gun fire ship, previously the civilian vessel Alex Roberts. She was purchased in 1739 and was broken up by 1742 after service in the War of the Austrian Succession.

== Service ==
She was purchased from Alexander Roberts on 29 June 1739 for £782.2.4½d. She underwent fitting out at Deptford Dockyard for a further £2,070.7.5d between July and August 1739. Commissioned in July that year, she served under Commander Robert Maynard for operations in the Caribbean during the War of Jenkins' Ear. Cumberland was present at Admiral Edward Vernon's attack on the port and defences at Chagres on 23 March 1740, and was later at the Battle of Cartagena de Indias in March and April 1741.

In 1741 she came under Commander Thomas Brodrick, at Jamaica. Cumberland was refitted at Woolwich Dockyard between September 1741 and January 1742, and then surveyed in February 1742. She was then broken up at Sheerness in late March 1742.
