= Arabella Jeffereyes =

Irish landowner and social radical

- Born: Arabella Fitzgibbon c. 1734; Sidbury, Devonshire, England
- Died: 1810 (aged 75–76)
- Other names: Arabella Jeffries; Arabella Jeffereys
- Spouse: James St John Jeffereyes

Arabella Jeffereyes (c. 1734 – c. 1810) was an Irish landowner and social radical.

== Early life ==
Arabella Jeffereyes was born Arabella Fitzgibbon around 1734. She was the eldest daughter of John and Elinor Fitzgibbon (née Grove). She had two sisters and four brothers, with her youngest brother going on to be the Earl of Clare and Lord Chancellor of Ireland, John FitzGibbon. It appears that Jeffereyes was probably born in Sidbury, Devonshire, before her family moved to Limerick. On 5 June 1762 she married James St John Jeffereyes, a landowner who owned extensive lands including Blarney Castle. The couple had one son and four daughters.

== Life and family ==
Jeffereyes positioned herself as one of the leading figures of Cork society and politics, particularly after the death of her husband in September 1780. She had fickle political sympathies, including supporting the Rightboys in County Cork in the late 1780s, allowing them to meet on her estate. She wrote letters to both Catholic and Protestant clergy calling on them to stop oppressing people. Many of her activities led to her being rebuked by her brother, John FitzGibbon. Due to her kind treatment of her tenants, she was known as "Lady" Jeffereyes, attempting to set the Church of Ireland tithes on her estates, organising marches on churches, and attempting unsuccessfully to arrange the drainage of a lake near Blarney Castle. She was regarded as eccentric by her peers, it is reported that she allowed widows to live rent-free until their eldest son came of age. She did not extend sympathy to criminals, she was the victim of highway robbery in London on 5 June 1784, during which a diamond pin was stolen. She testified at the trial of Robert Moore on 7 July, he was found guilty and sentenced to death.

She considered herself a patron of the arts, financing the English actress Mrs Frances Abington. She championed the artist James Dowling Herbert, and even when he considered abandoning painting for acting, she found him a position at a London theatre company. Despite the wealth her husband left her, Jeffereyes had financial difficulties, and in 1790 she was threatened with eviction from a house she rented and was only saved from this by her brother, who wanted to avoid any embarrassment. Later the same year, she attempted to secure the post of adjutant general for her son-in-law, Col. Stephen Freemantle, but this was refused by King George III. Her son, George Charles, married Anne the daughter of David La Touche. She arranged for the marriage of her daughter Emily to Richard Butler, 1st Earl of Glengall, having gone to great expense to arrange the match including rescuing Butler from a life of poverty in France. Her eldest daughter, Marianne or Mary Anne, married George Nugent, 7th Earl of Westmeath in 1784, but this marriage ended in divorce on the grounds of Marianne's adultery. Despite Marianne remarrying, Jeffereyes continued to claim Nugent as her son-in-law.

In the 1790s, she broke up with her brother FitzGibbon, after they quarrelled over land. Jeffereyes' son sold property to FitzGibbon but later regretted the sale, and Jeffereyes sided with her son against her brother. When FitzGibbon died in 1802, he disinherited her, denouncing her corrupt and dishonest character. She found herself with increasing financial difficulties, appealing to the Dublin Castle administration for a pension in 1807, claiming that she saved Clare from a mob in 1795 while disguised as a kitchen maid. The story was exaggerated but true, but was quietly ignored.

== Later life and death ==
She brought a lawsuit against her son and another man, David Foley, in 1810, accusing them of blackmail and libel. The co-plaintiff, Sophia, countess dowager of Annesley was represented by Sir Jonah Barrington, and it was claimed that Sophia had stated that Jeffereyes had murdered two patients at Simpson's hospital by poisoning them, a well as arranging the murder of another man to cover up the previous crime. An arrangement was reached out of court, so the case was dropped. In her final years, it is speculated that she may have succumbed to senility or insanity, with the date of her death going unrecorded. Jeffereyes is mentioned in Richard Alfred Milliken's song The groves of Blarney which lauds her as "Lady Jeffreys that owns this station/Like Alexander or Queen Helen fair/There's no commander throughout the nation/For emulation can with her compare". It has been interpreted as showing Jeffereyes as an anti-establishment and a radical hidden within the nonsensical verse.
