= William Nassau Lees =

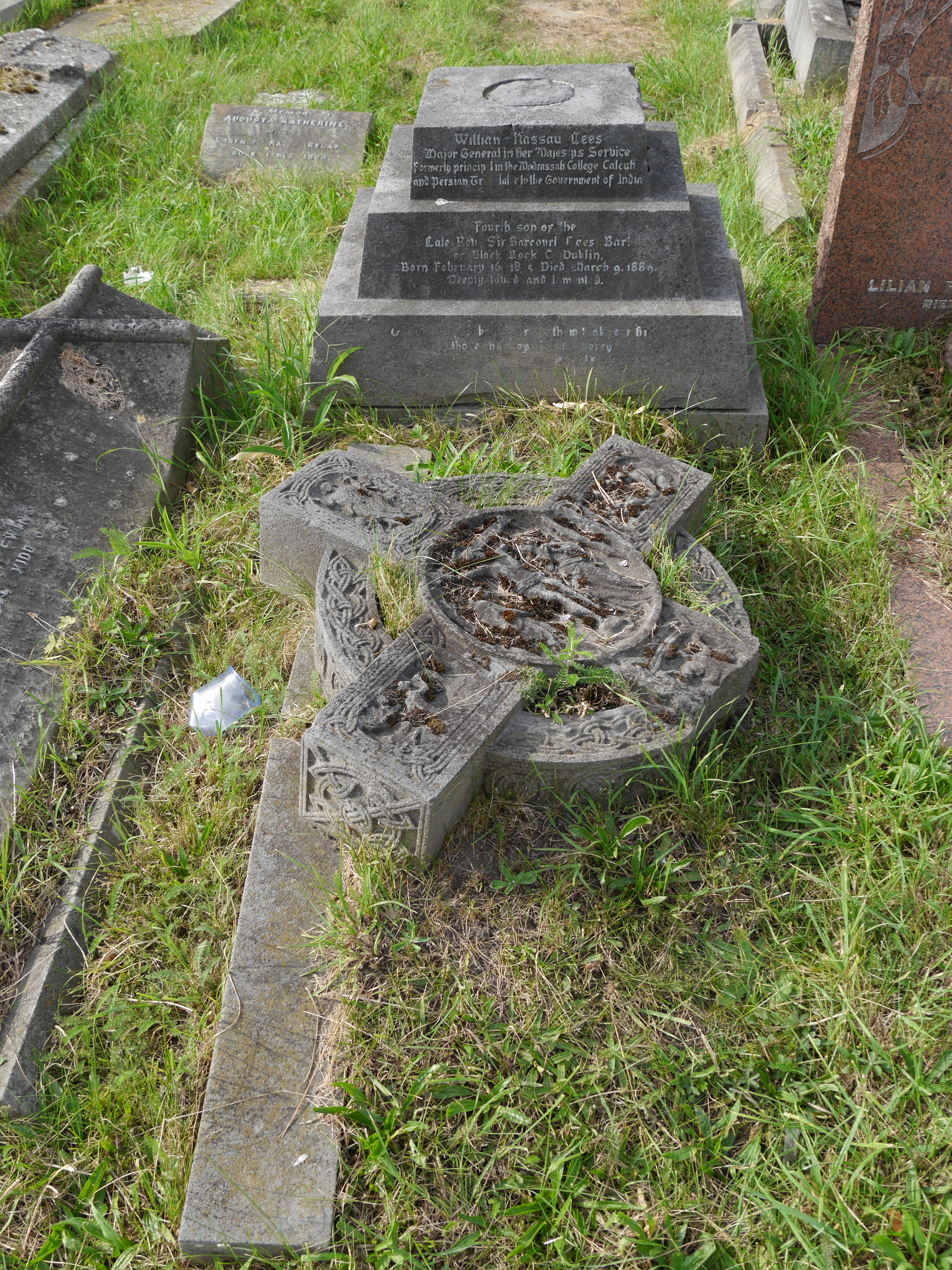
Brompton Cemetery monument

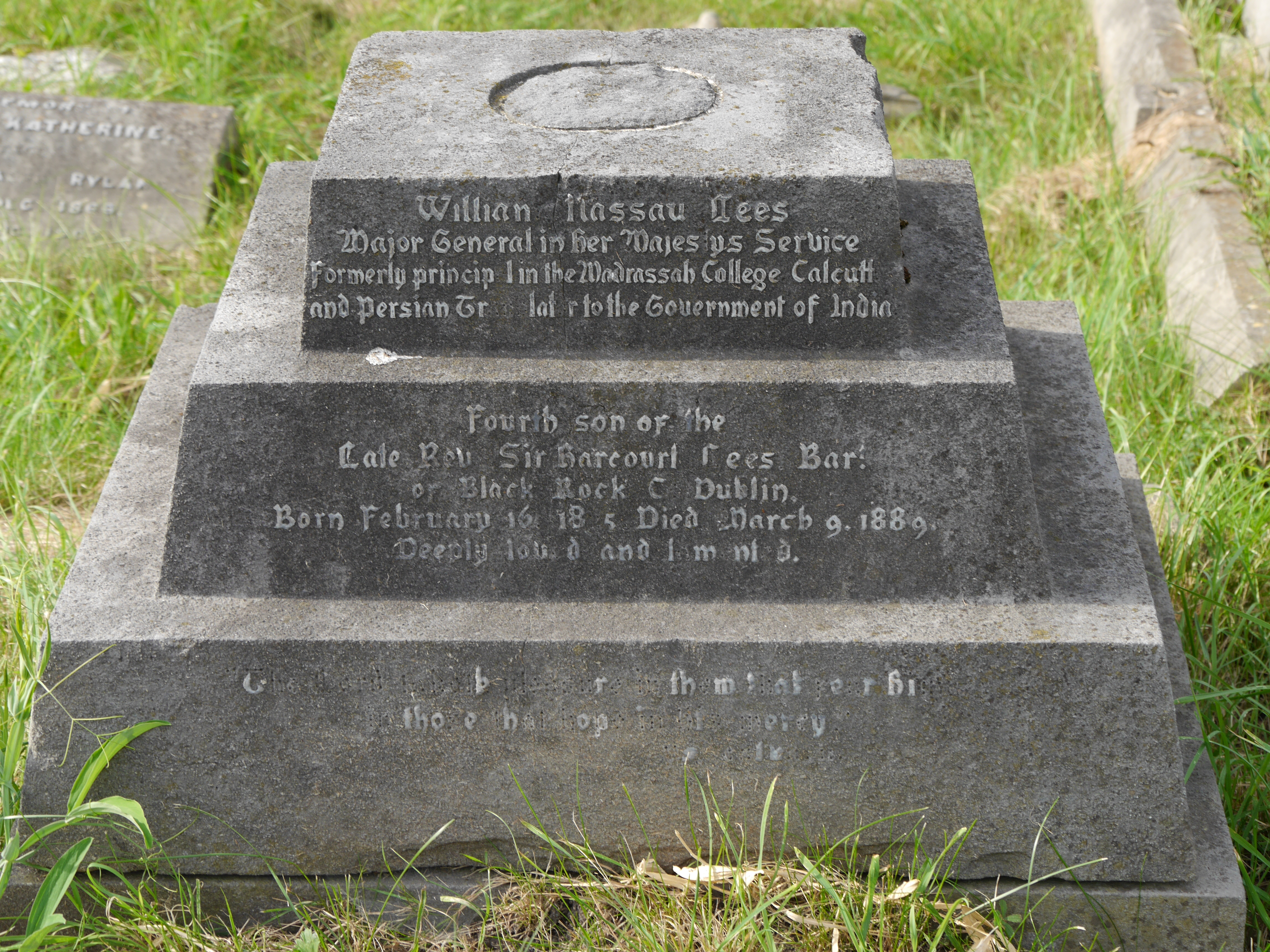
Detail

William Nassau Lees (1825–1889) was a British Army officer in India, known as an orientalist.

== Life ==
The fourth son of Sir Harcourt Lees, Bart., he was born on 26 February 1825, and educated at Nut Grove and at Trinity College, Dublin, but took no degree. He was appointed to a Bengal cadetship in 1846, and was posted to the 42nd Regiment of Bengal Native Infantry as ensign in March 1846. He became lieutenant in July 1853, captain in September 1858, major in June 1865, lieutenant-colonel in 1868, colonel in 1876, and major-general in 1885, having been placed on the supernumerary list in 1884.

Lees was for some years principal of the Calcutta Madrasa, where he was also professor of law, logic, literature, and mathematics. He was secretary to Fort William College, Persian translator to the government, and government examiner in Arabic, Persian, and Urdu for all branches of the service; and for some years part proprietor of the Times of India. In 1857 Trinity College, Dublin conferred on him the honorary degree of LL.D., and he was also a Ph.D. of Berlin. He became a member of the Royal Asiatic Society in 1872.

A conservative in politics, Lees twice sought to enter parliament, but without success. He died at his residence in Grosvenor Street, London, on 9 March 1889, aged 64.

== Works ==
- Fatúh'sh-Shám, attributed to al-Waqidi, Arabic edition (1853); an account of the Muslim conquest of Syria;
- Al-Kashshaaf, a tafsir (Qur'anic exegesis) commentary by al-Zamakhshari;
- Nafahatu l'Uns of Jámí (an account of saints and Sufis, modernised from an older chronicle), a foundational Persian work for the Western study of Sufism, and the Vis u Rámin, based on a Páhlévi romance of Vis and Rāmin, were well known.
- Instruction in Oriental Languages, especially as regards Candidates for the East India Company's Service, and as a National Question, London and Edinburgh, 1857.
- A Biographical Sketch of the Mystic Philosopher and Poet, Jámí, London, 1859.
- Guide to the Examinations at Fort William, Calcutta, 1862.
- Resolutions, Regulations, Despatches, and Laws relating to the Sale of Waste Lands and Immigration to India, Calcutta, 1863.
- The Drain of Silver to the East, and the Currency of India, London, 1864 (1865).
- Memoranda written after a Visit to the Tea Districts of E. Bengal, Calcutta, 1866.
- Land and Labour in India, a review, London, 1867.

While still an ensign, Lees also edited, or co-edited, various Indian works. He assisted in the production by Indian writers of the A'aris i Buzurgan (1855), consisting of obituary notices of Muslim physicians (edited by Lees and the Maulavi Kaberu 'd din Ahmad); a History of the Caliphs (1856); a Book of Anecdotes, Wonders, Pleasantries, Rarities, and Useful Extracts (1856); and the Alamgirmáneh (1868). He contributed to the Royal Asiatic Society's Journal and the Journal of the Asiatic Society of Bengal. He supervised the printing of William Hook Morley's edition of the Tárikh-i-Baihaki, and in part superintended that of the Maulávi Sáiyid, Ahmad Khan's edition (1868) of the Tárikh-i-Firuz Sháhi by Ziyáu 'd-Din Barani. He was joint editor (1863) of the Tabakát i Nasiri, by Minháju 'd-Din al Jurjáni, and (1864) of the Muntakh-abu't Tawárikh of Abd'ul Kádir Badáuni. The publication of the Ikbál Námeh-i-Jahángíri of M'Ulamád Khan, and the Badsháh Námeh of Abd'ul-Hámed Lahauri was also under his care.

Lees was also a prolific journalist on Indian topics, political, military, and economic. Indian Mussulmans comprised three letters reprinted from the Times, four articles from the Calcutta Englishman, an article on the Prince Consort, and an appendix, London, 1871.

== Notes ==
Attribution

This article incorporates text from a publication now in the public domain: Lee, Sidney, ed. (1892). "Lees, William Nassau". Dictionary of National Biography. Vol. 32. London: Smith, Elder & Co.
