= O'Malley baronets =

Extinct baronetcy in the Baronetage of the United Kingdom

The O'Malley Baronetcy, of Rosehill in the County of Mayo, was a title in the Baronetage of the United Kingdom. It was created on 2 July 1804 for Samuel O'Malley. The title became extinct on the death of the second Baronet in 1892.

The first baron was son of Owen O'Malley and Anne McGough, daughter of Samuel McGough, esquire of Newry.

== O'Malley baronets, of Rosehill (1804) ==
- Sir Samuel O'Malley, 1st Baronet (1779–1864)
- Sir William O'Malley, 2nd Baronet (1816–1892)

Coat of arms of O'Malley of Rosehill
Crest A horse in full speed Argent Escutcheon Argent, a boar passant Gules crined Or, between three long bows, charged with arrows, and bent, pointing in center, one in chief, and a skiff with oars, Sable, and two in base Motto Terra marique potens

Baronetage of the United Kingdom
Preceded by Lees baronets	O'Malley baronets of Rosehill; 2 July 1804	Succeeded by Myers baronets
