= County Antrim (Parliament of Ireland constituency) =

Pre-1801 Irish constituency

Coordinates: 54.711°N 6.196°W

- Former county constituency for the Irish House of Commons
- County: County Antrim

–1801
- Seats: 2
- Replaced by: Antrim

County Antrim, Ireland, was represented in the Irish House of Commons by a county constituency of two knights of the shire (or MPs) until the abolition of the Irish Parliament on 1 January 1801. It was enfranchised as a parliamentary constituency at an uncertain date, between the first known meeting of the Parliament in 1264 and the division of the area into baronies in 1584.

The county was represented in the Parliament of the Commonwealth of England, Scotland and Ireland, under the Instrument of Government, after it was established in 1654 as part of the constituency of Down, Antrim and Armagh. Following the restoration of the monarchy in 1660 the Parliament of Ireland was re-established and the constituency again returned two Members of Parliament. In the Patriot Parliament of 1689 summoned by James II, County Antrim was represented with two members.

Under the Acts of Union 1800, the county was represented by the Westminster constituency of County Antrim with two MPs in the United Kingdom House of Commons.

== Boundaries and boundary changes ==
1264-1800: A Topographical Dictionary of Ireland by Samuel Lewis discusses the administrative history of Antrim. It is uncertain when Antrim was made a County and given representation as such in Parliament. Something like the modern arrangements seems to have originated in 1584 when the Lord Deputy Sir John Perrot divided the area into baronies. The parliamentary boroughs of Antrim (from 1666), Belfast (1613), Carrickfergus (1326), Lisburn (1661) and Randalstown (1683) had separate representation.

== Members of Parliament ==
Election	First MP	Second MP
1585	Edward Berkeley	Shane McBrien O'Neill
1613	Sir Fulke Conway	Sir Moyses Hill
1634	Arthur Chichester	John Clotworthy
1639	Arthur Chichester	Sir Roger Langford
1660	Sir John Clotworthy	Sir George Rawdon
1661	Sir John Skeffington, Bt	John Davys
1665	Sir Toby (or John) Poyntz (Note: The Lord Lieutenant wrote to the Sheriff of Antrim on 2 November 1665 recommending Poyntz as the successor of Skeffington, who had inherited a peerage in September as Viscount Massereene. In the absence of evidence to the contrary it is assumed that, in this period, such a recommendation was tantamount to election.)	Conway Hill, Esq
1689	Cormack O'Neile	Randal MacDonnell
1692	Sir Robert Colville	Clotworthy Skeffington
1695	Sir Robert Colville	Arthur Upton
1697	Hugh Colville	Arthur Upton
1703	Clotworthy Skeffington	Clotworthy Upton
November 1715	John Skeffington (Note: Declared not duly elected in 1715.)	Clotworthy Upton
1715	Sir Arthur Langford, 2nd Bt	Clotworthy Upton
1716	Thomas Upton	Clotworthy Upton
1725	Thomas Upton	John Upton
1727	John Skeffington	John Upton
1741	Arthur Skeffington	Henry Seymour Conway
1747	Hugh Skeffington	Henry Seymour Conway
1768	Viscount Dunluce	Viscount Beauchamp
1776	Hon. Henry Seymour-Conway	James Willson
1783	John O'Neill	Hon. Hercules Rowley
1792	John O'Neill	Edward Jones-Agnew
1794	Hugh Boyd	Edward Jones-Agnew
1796	John Staples	Edward Jones-Agnew
1798	John Staples	Edmund Alexander Macnaghten
1801	Succeeded by the Westminster constituency of County Antrim	

=== Elections ===
1761 general election: County Antrim
Party	Candidate	Votes	%	±%
	Henry Seymour Conway	663		
	Hugh Skeffington	659		
	John O'Neill	406		
	C. O'Hara	351		

1768 general election: County Antrim
Party	Candidate	Votes	%	±%
	Viscount Dunluce	Uncontested		
	Viscount Beauchamp	Uncontested		

1776 general election: County Antrim
Party	Candidate	Votes	%	±%
	Hon. Henry Seymour-Conway	1,246		
	James Willson	1,234		
	Hugh Skeffington	1,125		
	M. Dalway	1,021		

1783 general election: County Antrim
Party	Candidate	Votes	%	±%
	John O'Neill	Uncontested		
	Hon. Hercules Rowley	Uncontested		

1790 general election: County Antrim
Party	Candidate	Votes	%	±%
	John O'Neill	1,939		
	Hon. Hercules Rowley	1,867		
	J. Leslie	1,708		
	Edmund Alexander Macnaghten	1,499		
Turnout		3,507		

1793 County Antrim by-election
Party	Candidate	Votes	%	±%
	Hugh Boyd	Uncontested		

1795 County Antrim by-election
Party	Candidate	Votes	%	±%
	John Staples	Uncontested		

1797 general election: County Antrim
Party	Candidate	Votes	%	±%
	John Staples	1,984		
	Edmund Alexander Macnaghten	1,518		
	Edward Jones-Agnew	981		
Turnout		4,483		

== Bibliography ==
- Bergin, John (2009). "Upton, Arthur". In Kinsella, Eoin; Clavin, Terry; Evers, Liz; Gallagher, Niav; Maume, Patrick; O'Riordan, Turlough (eds.). Dictionary of Irish Biography. Royal Irish Academy; Cambridge University Press. doi:10.3318/dib.008767.v1. Archived from the original on 2 November 2022.
- O'Hart, John (2007). The Irish and Anglo-Irish Landed Gentry: When Cromwell came to Ireland. Vol. II. Heritage Books. ISBN 978-0-7884-1927-0.
- Leigh Rayment's historical List of Members of the Irish House of Commons. Cites: Johnston-Liik, Edith Mary (2002). The History of the Irish Parliament 1692-1800 (6 volumes). Ulster Historical Foundation.
