= Charles O'Neill, 1st Earl O'Neill =

Irish politician, peer and landowner

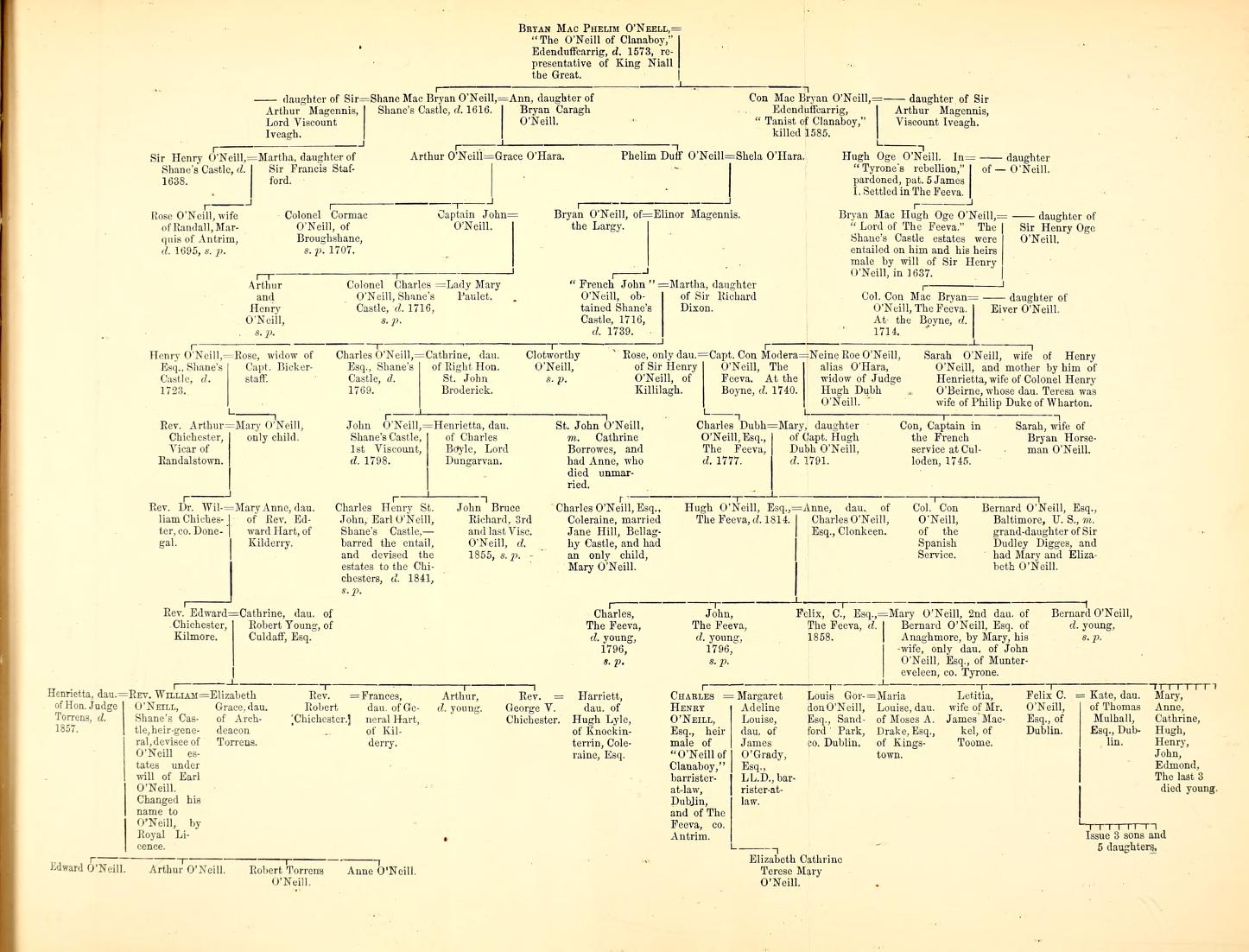
O'Neill Conroy family tree

Charles Henry St John O'Neill, 1st Earl O'Neill, KP, PC (I) (22 January 1779 – 12 February 1841) was an Irish politician, peer and landowner.

He was born in 1779 to John O'Neill, 1st Viscount O'Neill, of Shane's Castle, County Antrim, Ireland, and educated at Eton before joining Christ Church, Oxford on 23 November 1795. He succeeded as second Viscount O'Neill in 1798 on the death of his father and was made Viscount Raymond and Earl O'Neill in 1800 after the Act of Union, when it was decided that O'Neill should have precedence in the Irish peerage. After the passing of the act he was elected as one of the 28 Irish peers allowed to sit in the House of Lords in September 1800. In 1807 he was appointed one of the joint Postmasters General of Ireland along with Richard Trench, 2nd Earl of Clancarty and in 1809 with Laurence Parsons, 2nd Earl of Rosse; in practice this was merely an honorary appointment, with the Post Office secretary (Sir Edward Lees) doing much of the work. He was made a member of the Order of St. Patrick on 13 February 1809 and Lord Lieutenant of Antrim on 17 October 1831. He died on 25 March 1841 with no heirs; as such the earldom became extinct and the viscountcy transferred to his younger brother John O'Neill, 3rd Viscount O'Neill.

Political offices
New title	Representative peer for Ireland; 1800–1841	Succeeded by The Lord Blayney
Honorary titles
New office	Lord Lieutenant of Antrim; 1831–1841	Succeeded by The Marquess of Donegall
Peerage of Ireland
New creation	Earl O'Neill; 1800–1841	Extinct
Preceded by John O'Neill	Viscount O'Neill; 1798–1841	Succeeded by John O'Neill
