= Brodrick Thomas =

Brodrick Thomas may refer to:

- Broderick Thomas (born 1967), American football player
- Brodric Thomas (born 1997), American basketball player

== See also ==
- Thomas Brodrick (disambiguation)
