= Victor Vispré =

French painter

- Born: 20 May 1727; Besançon, France
- Died: 25 September 1781 (aged 54); Paris
- Occupation: portrait painter

Victor Vispré (20 May 1727 – 25 September 1781) was a French glass painter who spent time in London and Dublin.

== Life ==
Victor Vispré was born on 20 May 1727 in Besançon, France. His father was François or Jean-François Visprez or Vispray, was a limonadier living. His mother was Élisabeth Marcoul or Marcoux. His older brother, for whom he is sometimes confused, was also an artist, François-Xavier. In his youth, he may have known and been influenced by the glass painter Pierre Jouffroy.

Vispré exhibited fruit studies painted in oil on glass at the Society of Artists and the Free Society from 1763 to 1778, and later at the Royal Academy between 1770 and 1772. In 1762, he was admitted as a master to the guild of painters in The Hague. In 1778, he was elected a Fellow of the Society of Artists. Along with his brother, he spent time in Dublin, exhibiting with the Society of Artists in William Street in 1776. While in Dublin he also sold a medicine called "Extract of Saturn" which contained lead oxide and lead acetate. He returned to Paris in 1781, dying there on 25 September that year.

In 1755, he married Marie Cézérac. They had a son, Antoine-Nicolas Vispré (1757–1821). Vispré's second wife, Elizabeth Fisher, died in Dublin on 17 March 1780, aged 29. She was buried at the Huguenot Cemetery, Dublin.
