= John O'Neill, 1st Viscount O'Neill =

Irish politician

John O'Neill, 1st Viscount O'Neill PC (16 January 1740 – 18 June 1798) was an Irish politician.

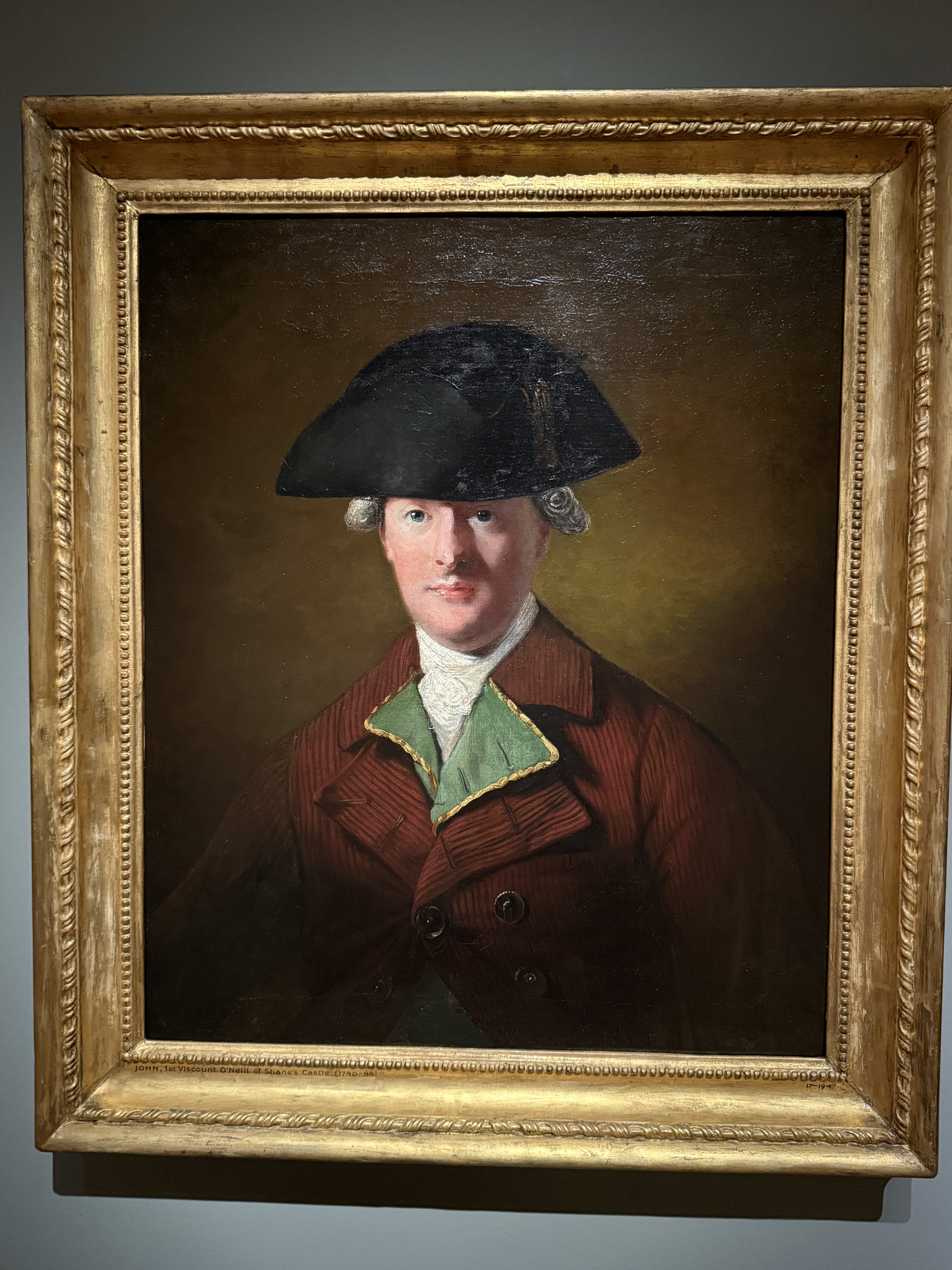
John O'Neill, 1st Viscount O'Neill, around 1780

O'Neill was the son of Charles O'Neill, Member of Parliament for Randalstown, by Catherine Brodrick, daughter of St John Brodrick, of Midleton, County Cork.

He was returned to the Irish House of Commons for Randalstown in 1760, a seat he held until 1783, and then represented County Antrim between 1783 and 1793. He was sworn of the Irish Privy Council in 1781.

In February 1782, he had been a delegate for Co. Antrim to the Ulster provincial Volunteer convention in Dungannon, and in November 1793 one of the five Co. Antrim delegates to the national Volunteer convention in Dublin that sought to build on the legislative independence secured for Ireland the previous year, with parliamentary reform.

In 1793, he was raised to the Peerage of Ireland as Baron O'Neill, of Shane's Castle in the County of Antrim. In 1795 he was further honoured when he was made Viscount O'Neill, of Shane's Castle in the County of Antrim, in the Irish peerage.

Lord O'Neill married the Honourable Henrietta Boyle, daughter of Charles Boyle, Viscount Dungarvan, in 1777. He was killed in the Battle of Antrim during the Irish Rebellion of 1798 at the age of 58 and was succeeded in the viscountcy by his son Charles, who was created Earl O'Neill in 1800.

Parliament of Ireland
Preceded by Charles O'Neill; Sir Kildare Borrowes, Bt	Member of Parliament for Randalstown; 1760–1783; With: Charles O'Neill 1760–1761; St John O'Neill 1761–1771; James St John Jeffereyes 1771–1781; Lord Rawdon 1781–1783	Succeeded by Michael Smith; John Dunn
Preceded by Hon. Henry Seymour-Conway; James Willson	Member of Parliament for County Antrim; 1783–1793; With: Hon. Hercules Rowley 1783–1792; Edward Jones-Agnew 1792–1793	Succeeded by Edward Jones-Agnew; Hugh Boyd
Peerage of Ireland
New creation	Viscount O'Neill; 1795–1798	Succeeded by Charles Henry St John O'Neill
New creation	Baron O'Neill; 1793–1798	Succeeded by Charles Henry St John O'Neill
