= Postmaster General for Scotland =

Former government position in Scotland

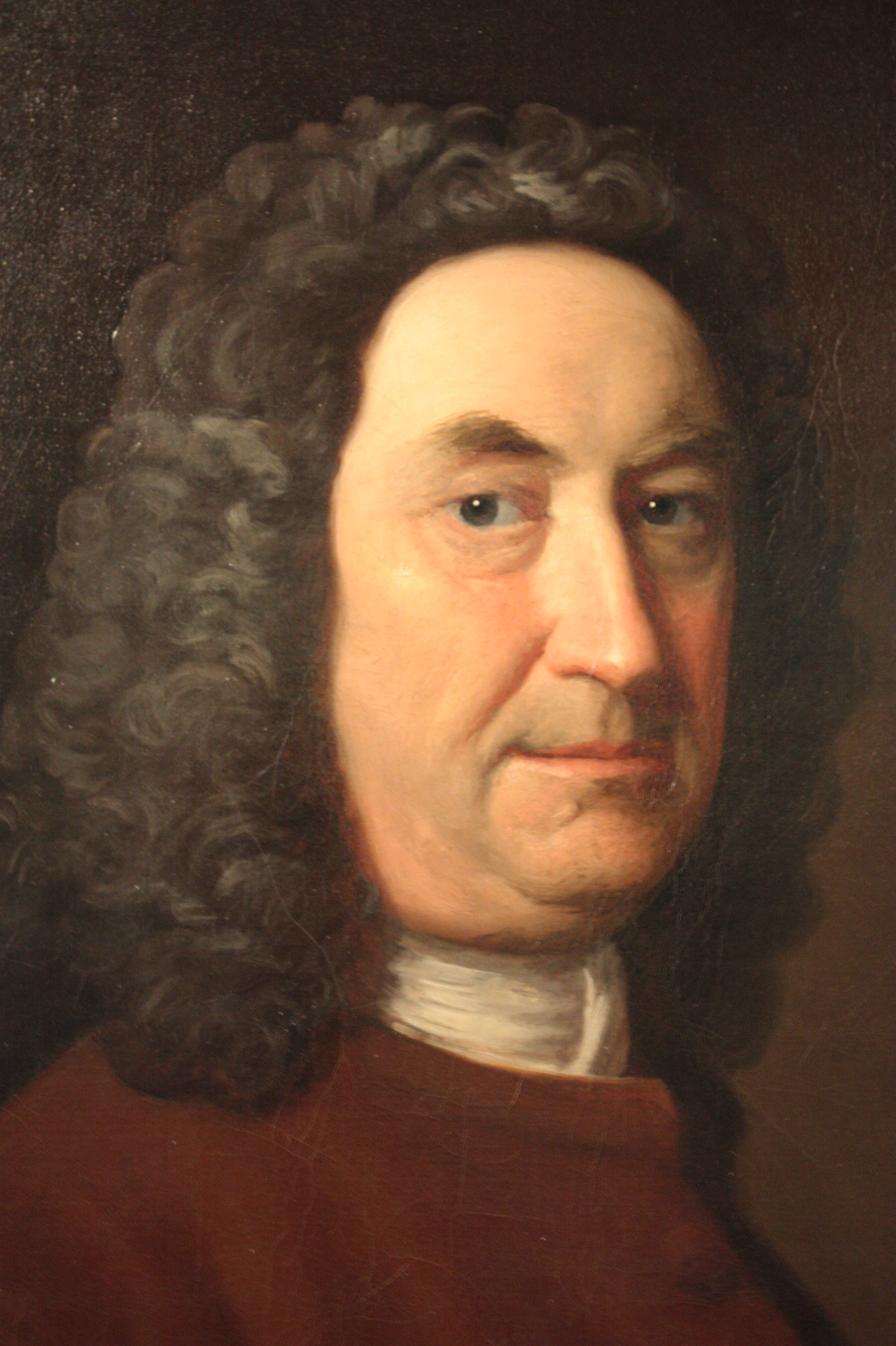
Sir John Inglis, who twice held the position of Deputy Postmaster General for Scotland (portrait by Allan Ramsay)

The Postmaster General for Scotland, based in Edinburgh, was responsible for the postal service in the Kingdom of Scotland from approximately 1616 until the Act of Union unified Scotland and England in 1707, creating a new state called the Kingdom of Great Britain. From 1711, the posts in Scotland were the responsibility of the Deputy Postmaster General for Scotland, until in 1831, that position was subsumed into the duties of the Postmaster General of the United Kingdom.

== History ==
The Union of the Crowns took place in 1603 and on 5 May a public postal system was set up between Berwick, just south of the Scottish border, and Edinburgh. At some time after 1603 the post of Postmaster General for Scotland was established by the Privy Council of Scotland with the first appointment mentioned in 1616 as Sir William Seton. From Privy Council records, Seton appears to have held the position until 1631, or 1633. His death is given as 1635, but in a 1641 act of the Scottish Parliament it ratifies his appointment for life as "His Majesty's cheefe post maister of all his Hienes postmaisteres ..." at a salary of £500 per annum. No new appointment was made until 1649 when the Commonwealth took over the post in Scotland.

Following the 1660 restoration of the monarchy, one Patrick Grahame became Postmaster General for Scotland under the Privy Seal of King Charles II from 14 September 1662 for his lifetime at the same salary of £500 per annum: officium precipui magistri cursoris lie Postmaster-Generall et Censoris omnium cursorum dicti regni Scotie. Grahame's son John obtained the position after his father's death in 1674 at a new salary of £1,000 per annum and held the office until 1689.

In August 1695 an act of William III, the Post Office Act 1695 (c. 31), again established a General Post Office in Scotland to be set up in Edinburgh:

from whence all letters and pacquets whatsoever may with speed and expedition sent into any part of the kingdom, or any other of his Majesty's dominions, or into any kingdom or country beyond seas, by the pacquest sealed to London. It is also enacted, that a Postmaster-General shall be appointed by letters patent under the Privy Seal.

The Post Office (Revenues) Act 1710 (9 Ann. c. 11) repealed the Post Office Act 1695 and united the Post Offices of England and Scotland under one Postmaster-General as the Postmaster-General of Great Britain; from 1711 in Scotland the office was managed by a deputy postmaster general. The first Deputy Postmaster General for Scotland was George Main who held the office of Postmaster General for Scotland until 1707 and between then and his appointment as deputy he was the Post Office Manager for Scotland During his tenure between May and September 1707 he is described as the Postmaster of North Britain.

Curiously, some early 19th century Edinburgh Post Office directories were published under the patronage of the Postmaster General of Scotland by Robert Trotter, Francis Gray, Earl of Caithness and Sir David Wedderburn even though that post no longer officially existed.

The Scottish postmaster generalship, as with the same office in Ireland, was finally abolished, not at the time of the Act of Union in 1800 but in 1831. The 1831 published Post Office Annual Directory was issued under the patronage of Sir Edward Smith Lees, Secretary to the General Post Office for Edinburgh who had been moved to Scotland when he swopped his Irish secretaryship with his counterpart Augustus Godby during the reforms of the Irish Post Office in 1831.

== Postmasters-General in Scotland ==
Year	Officeholder
1616–1633	Sir William Seton
1662–1674	Patrick Grahame
1674–1689	John Grahame
1689–1696	John Blair
1696–?	Sir Robert Sinclair
1 May 1701–11 November 1707	George Main

== Deputy Postmasters-General in Scotland ==
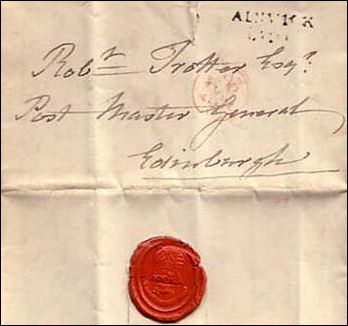
Cover from Alnwick addressed to Robert Trotter in 1805

Year	Officeholder
1710–1715	George Main
1715–1717	James Anderson
1717–1725	Sir John Inglis, 2nd Baronet
1725–1740	Archibald Douglas
1740–1742	James Colhoun (sic)
1742–1745	Sir John Inglis, 2nd Baronet
1745–1764	Alexander Hamilton (of Ballincrieff) and Innerwick
1764–(d 1795)	Robert Oliphant of Rossie
1795–(d 1799)	Thomas Elder
c.1800–1802	William Robertson
1802–1807	Robert Trotter of Castlelaw
1807–1810	Francis Gray, later 14th Lord Gray of Kinfauns
1811–1823	James Sinclair, 12th Earl of Caithness
1823–1831	Sir David Wedderburn, 1st Baronet

== See also ==
- Postmasters General of Ireland
- Postmaster General of the United Kingdom
