= Ivan Ewart =

Northern Irish naval officer and businessman (1919–1995)

Sir William Ivan Cecil Ewart, 6th Baronet DSC (18 July 1919 – 29 November 1995) was a decorated Northern Irish naval officer, businessman and charity worker. He succeeded his cousin as baronet in 1959.

== Early years ==
Sir Ivan was the son of Major William Basil Ewart (the son of Oxford educated barrister F. W. Ewart) and Rebe Annette Grindle.

Born into an Irish family of linen industrialists, their firm employed over 2,500 people, making it one of the largest manufacturers and exporters of Irish linen in the western world. Born at Derryvolgie House, Lisburn, where he resided until 1970, he was educated at Radley. He took over the running of the family business after the war. Families such as the Ewarts were referred to colloquially as the "Linenocracy" or "Linen barons."

== War years ==
Sir Ivan served during the Second World War as Lieutenant in the Royal Navy Volunteer Reserve. He served on a Motor Torpedo Boat which he commanded which on 17 January 1942 this came under German fire and, in the ensuing explosions etc., He lost an eye and severely injured his right arm. He was, distinctively, to wear an eye patch for the rest of his life.

He was later captured by the Germans and sent to Colditz Castle, a camp for "incorrigible" Allied officers who had repeatedly escaped from other camps, where he spent the remainder of the war. In 1945 he was awarded the Distinguished Service Cross.

== Business and charity work ==
In 1948 Ivan married Pauline Preston. He took on the running his family's linen business, William Ewart & Son Ltd., in 1954. Other business interests included William Ewart Investments Ltd, Belfast (1973–77); chairman and Ewart New Northern Ltd, Belfast (1973–77). Ten years later his wife died and, in the wake of this, Sir Ivan went to East Africa to work with Royal Commonwealth Society for the Blind (for which he was East Africa's Resident Representative) and later at the Freda Carr Hospital in Uganda.

Ivan was also president of the Northern Ireland Chamber of Commerce and Industry (The papers of Enoch Powell), a Northern Ireland Delegate to the Duke of Edinburgh's Study Conference on the Human Problems of Industrial Communities within the Commonwealth and Empire at Oxford in 1956, President of the Church of Ireland's Young Men's Society, 1951–61 and Chairman of the Flax Spinners Association. In 1976, he was appointed High Sheriff of Antrim.

He was President of Oldpark Unionist Association and 1950–68. Belfast Harbour Commissioner from 1968 to 1977 and High Sheriff for County Antrim (Royal Naval Volunteer Reserve (RNVR) Officers 1939–1945).

Several weeks before his death he travelled to Germany to meet with an officer who had participated in the attack upon his MTB. This was an event he had been waiting fifty years for, he held no animosity toward the enemy, regarding them as honourable adversaries.

He had one son, his heir, Sir Michael Ewart, 7th Baronet, and two daughters; Susan Eveleen and Patricia Rebe. He lived at Hill House, Hillsborough, County Down.

Baronetage of the United Kingdom
Preceded by Talbot Ewart	Baronet (of Glenmachan, Down); 1959–1995	Succeeded by Michael Ewart
