= Lees baronets =

There have been three baronetcies created for persons with the surname Lees, all in the Baronetage of the United Kingdom.

- Lees baronets of Blackrock (1804)
- Lees baronets of South Lytchett Manor (1897)
- Lees baronets of Longdendale (1937)

== See also ==
- Leese baronets
