= Edward Barclay =

Edward Barclay may refer to:

- Edward Exton Barclay (1860–1948), English gentleman and foxhunter
- David Edward Durell Barclay (1858–1918), 12th Baronet of the Barclay baronets
- Edward Barclay, character in Round-Up Time in Texas

== See also ==
- Eddie Barclay (1921–2005), French music producer
- Edward Berkeley (disambiguation)
