= Timothy Armitage (minister) =

Timothy Armitage (died 1655) was, in 1647, "chosen pastor of the first independent (or congregational) church in the city of Norwich". This was an offshoot from that of the venerable William Bridge's church at Great Yarmouth. It was erected into a "separate congregation" on 10 June 1644, "in the presence of several of their brethren from Yarmouth, who signified their approbation by expressions of the most tender and endeared affection". The members of both congregations had been exiles in Holland and elsewhere. They returned home on the outbreak of the English Civil War.

Armitage laboured tirelessly until his nonconformist congregation was larger than any in the city. He was superintendent (in connection with Bridge) of numerous nonconformist congregations in Norfolk and Suffolk. The following is the title-page of an unusually scarce book by him: "A Tryall of Faith, or the Woman of Canaan on Matthew xv. 21-24. Together with the Souls Sure Anchor-hold on Hebrews vi. 19, with the Wisedome of timely remembring our Creator on Eccles. xii. 1. In severall Sermons by Timothy Armitage, Late Minister of the Gospel in Norwitch'"(1661), pp. vi, 479. He died in December 1655.
