= Edward Berkeley (died 1596) =

English politician

Edward Berkeley (died 1596) was an English politician. He was a member (MP) of the parliament of England for Old Sarum in 1586, and sat in the Irish House of Commons in 1585 as an MP for County Antrim.
