= St John O'Neill =

St John O'Neill (6 May 1741–March 1790) represented Randalstown in the Irish House of Commons from 1771 to 1776. and was High Sheriff of Antrim in 1774. He was returned unopposed at a by-election for Randalstown occasioned by the death of his father Charles O'Neill of Shane's Castle. Randalstown was a pocket borough of his family and its other MP was his elder brother John O'Neill, later 1st Viscount O'Neill.

St John O'Neill married a Miss Borrowes and they had one daughter, who died unmarried. (Note: Bernard Burke named the wife Cathrine [sic] in 1860, but "Frances, daughter of Robert Borrowes of Ballybrittas" in 1871. Mervyn Archdall makes her the daughter of Robert Borrowes of Kildare, husband of Charles O'Neill's sister Mary. William Courthope spells the surname Burrowes. Burke names the daughter Anne, whereas John O'Hart names her Mary.) He resided at Portglenone Castle, and donated a copper collecting-ladle to the Portglenone chapel of ease of the Church of Ireland parish of Ahoghill, and a church organ to the Catholic chapel near by at Aughnahoy.
