= Timothy Armitage (politician) =

Irish politician (1675-1715)

Timothy Armitage (1675–1715) was an Irish politician.

Armitage was educated at Trinity College, Dublin. He was MP for Randalstown in County Antrim from 1703 to 1713.
