= François-Xavier Vispré =

French painter

- Born: 13 May 1725; Voisey, Haute-Marne, France
- Died: 28 August 1792 (aged 67); London
- Occupation: portrait painter

François-Xavier Vispré (13 May 1725 - 28 August 1792) was a French portrait painter and printmaker who spent time in London and Dublin.

== Life ==
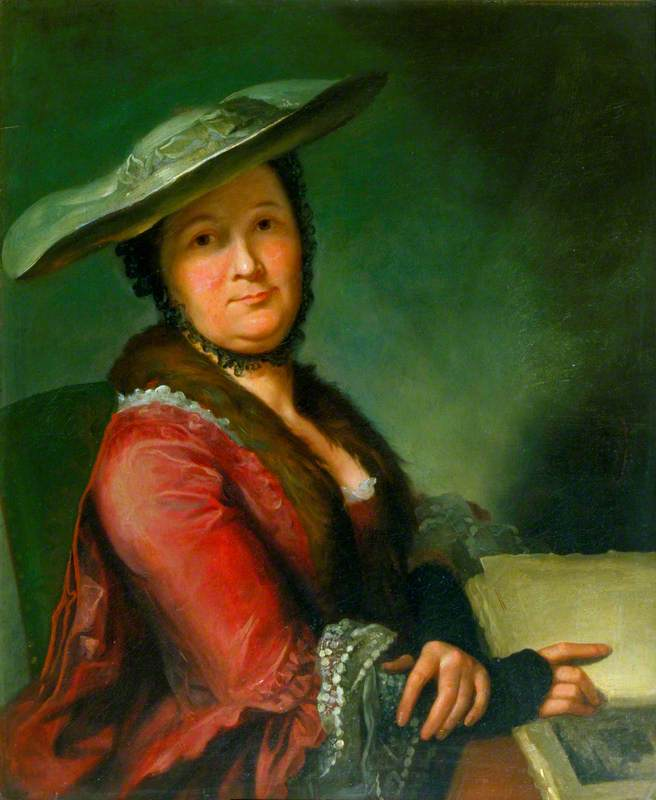
Madame Roubiliac by Vispré, held in the Victoria and Albert Museum

François-Xavier Vispré was born on 13 May 1725 in Voisey, Haute-Marne. His father was François or Jean-François Visprez or Vispray, was a limonadier living in Besançon. His mother was Élisabeth Marcoul or Marcoux. Vispré moved to London in 1760, where he painted portraits and miniatures in oil and crayons. From 1760 to 1783, he exhibited with the Society of Artists, being elected a Fellow in 1771. He also made prints in mezzotint and aquatint, with his prints often catalogued as "François Xavier".

Vispré moved to Dublin in 1776, exhibiting with the Society of Artists on William Street in 1777. He returned to London in 1780, exhibiting portraits at the Royal Academy in 1788 and 1789.

It has been claimed that he was a Huguenot but this has been questioned. He was a friend of Louis-François Roubiliac. He worked with his younger brother, Victor, who was also an artist. As "Francis Xaverius Vispre", he is recorded as marrying Mary Hunter in St Anne's, Soho on 12 April 1764. They has two sons James Vespre (1766-1768) and John Francis Vispré (born 1776). He died in London on 28 August 1792.
