= Thomas Brodrick (Royal Navy officer) =

Royal Navy officer

Vice-Admiral Thomas Brodrick
- Died: 1 January 1769
- Military career
- Allegiance: Great Britain
- Branch: Royal Navy
- Service years: 1723–1769
- Rank: Vice-Admiral
- Commands: HMS Cumberland; HMS Shoreham; HMS Exeter; HMS Dreadnought
- Conflicts: War of Jenkins' Ear; Battle of Porto Bello; Battle of Cartagena de Indias; Invasion of Cuba; Seven Years' War; Raid on Rochefort; Battle of Lagos

Thomas Brodrick (1705 – 1 January 1769) was an officer of the Royal Navy during the War of the Austrian Succession, the War of Jenkins' Ear and the Seven Years' War.

== Life ==
Brodrick entered the navy about 1723. In 1739 he was a lieutenant of HMS Burford, Admiral Edward Vernon's flagship at the Battle of Porto Bello, and commanded the landing party which stormed the Castillo de Fierro. In recompense for his conduct Vernon promoted him to the command of the fireship HMS Cumberland, in which he in 1741 took part in the Battle of Cartagena de Indias. On 25 March 1741 he was "posted" (i.e. made Post Captain) into the frigate HMS Shoreham, and continued actively employed during the rest of that campaign, and afterwards in the expedition to Cuba. After other service he returned to England in 1743, and early in the following year was appointed to the 60-gun HMS Exeter. In March of the following year he was appointed to HMS Dreadnought, which was sent out to the Leeward Islands, and continued there until after the peace in 1748.

In May 1756 Brodrick was sent out to the Mediterranean in command of reinforcements for Admiral John Byng, whom he joined at Gibraltar just before the admiral was ordered home under arrest. He had meantime been advanced on 4 June to the rank of rear admiral, in which rank he served under Sir Edward Hawke until towards the close of the year, when the fleet returned home. In January 1757 he was a member of the court-martial on Admiral Byng; and was afterwards, with his flag in HMS Namur, third in command in the expedition against Rochefort. Early in 1758 Brodrick was appointed as second in command in the Mediterranean, with his flag on board the 90-gun HMS Prince George. On 13 April, being then off Ushant, the Prince George caught fire, and out of a complement of nearly 800, some 250 only were saved; the rear admiral himself was picked up, stark naked, by a merchant-ship's boat, after he had been swimming for about an hour. Brodrick and the survivors of his ship's company were taken by HMS Glasgow to Gibraltar, where he hoisted his flag in HMS St George.

On the following 14 February (1759) he was promoted to the rank of vice admiral, and was shortly afterwards superseded by Admiral Edward Boscawen, under whom he commanded during the blockade of Toulon, and in the action of 18–19 August, culminating in the burning or capture of the French ships in Lagos Bay. When Boscawen returned to England, Brodrick blockaded the French ships at Cádiz so closely, that even the friendly Spaniards could not resist making them the subject of insolent ridicule. They are said to have stuck up a notice in some such terms as "For sale, eight French men-of-war. For particulars apply to vice-admiral Brodrick". The French ships did not stir out till the passage was cleared for them by a gale, which compelled the blockading squadron to put into Gibraltar. Brodrick then returned to England. He had no further employment, but sat for the family borough of Midleton in the Parliament of Ireland from 1761 to 1768. He died 1 January 1769 of cancer in the face. He is buried at St. Nicholas's church, Peper Harrow, Surrey, where there is a memorial to him.

Parliament of Ireland
Preceded by James St John Jeffereyes; Francis Andrews	Member of Parliament for Midleton; 1761–1768; With: James St John Jeffereyes	Succeeded by James St John Jeffereyes; Edward Brodrick
