= Lees baronets of Longdendale (1937) =

Escutcheon of the Lees baronets of Longdendale (1937)

The Lees Baronetcy, of Longdendale in the County Palatine of Chester, was created in the Baronetage of the United Kingdom on 2 March 1937 for Sir Clare Lees. He notably served as Deputy Chairman of Martins Bank.

== Lees baronets, of Longdendale (1937) ==
- Sir (William) Clare Lees, Kt., OBE, 1st Baronet (1874–1951)
- Sir William Hereward Clare Lees, 2nd Baronet (1904–1976)
- Sir (William) Antony Clare Lees, 3rd Baronet (1935–2018)

There is no heir to the baronetcy, thus the title is extinct.
