= Harcourt Lees =

Irish clergyman

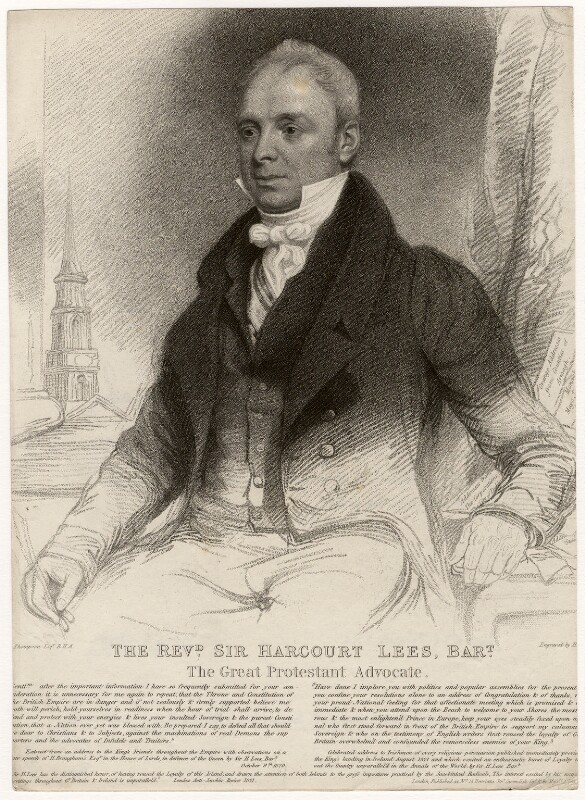
Sir Harcourt Lees, 2nd Baronet, 1824 portrait

The Reverend Sir Harcourt Lees (29 November 1776 – 7 March 1852 in Blackrock, near Dublin) was an Irish clergyman and political pamphleteer on behalf of Protestant Ascendancy in Ireland. He is best known for his strongly worded pamphlets attacking Roman Catholicism.

== Life ==
Harcourt Lees was the eldest son of Sir John Lees, Bt. (created 1804), by Mary, eldest daughter of Robert Cathcart of Glandusk, Ayrshire. He graduated B.A. at Trinity College, Cambridge, in 1799, and proceeded M.A. in 1802. His father saw service in Germany under the Marquess of Granby, and had been private secretary to Lord Townshend during his administration of Ireland, where he was secretary to the post-office from 1784 until his death in 1811.

Sir Harcourt Lees took holy orders, and was preferred to the rectory and vicarage in the Parish of Killanny, a parish partially in County Monaghan and partially in County Louth. He was collated to the prebend of Fennor in the church of Cashel 21 November 1800, and to that of Tullycorbet in the church of Clogher in 1801. He resigned both stalls in July 1806. He died at Blackrock, near Dublin, on 7 March 1852.

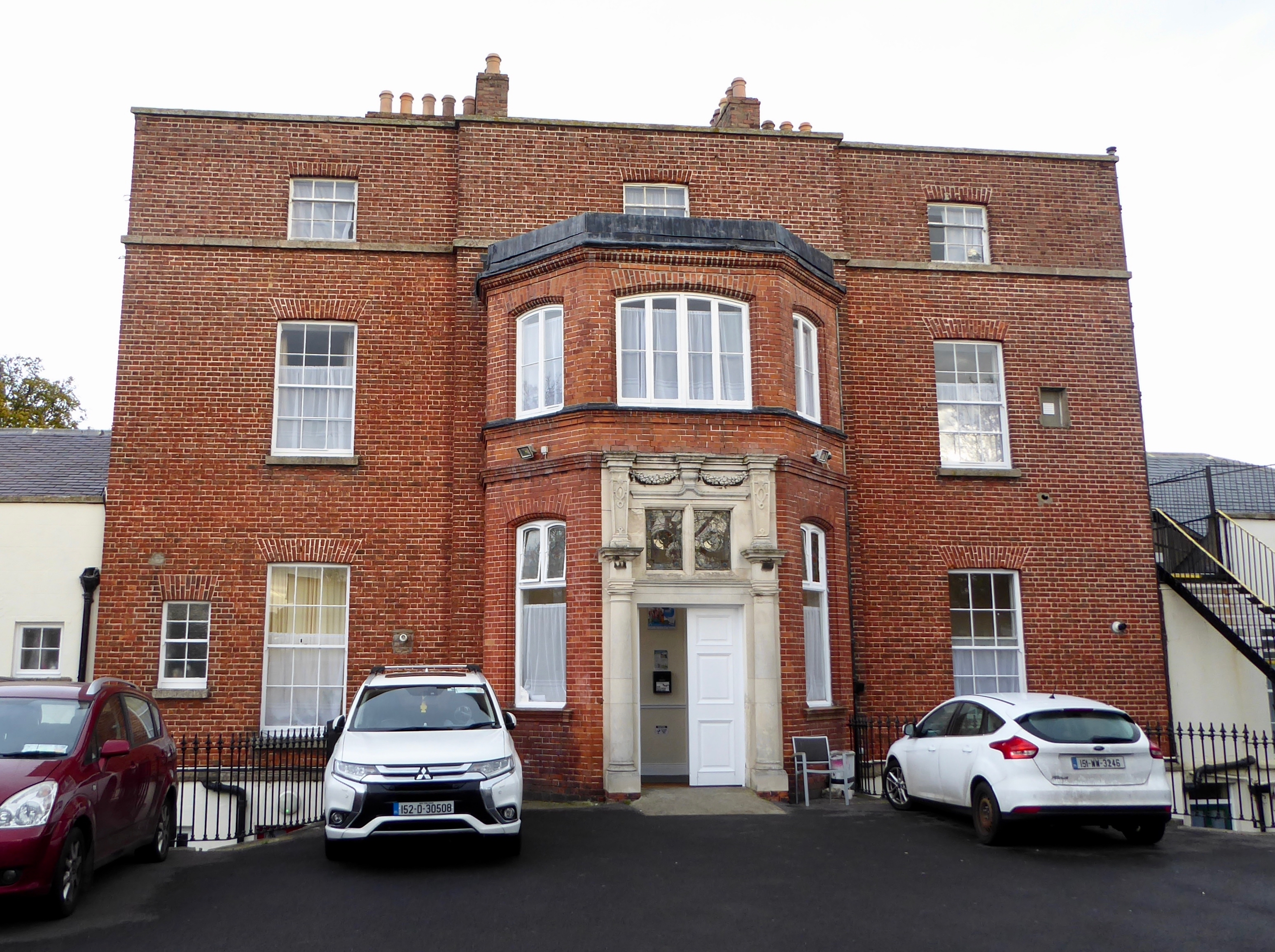
Blackrock House in November 2021

Harcourt Lees succeeded his father as second Baronet in 1811 and inherited Blackrock House. He married, in or about October 1812, Sophia, daughter of Colonel Lyster of Grange, County Roscommon, by whom he had four sons and four daughters. His fourth son was William Nassau Lees. Lees was succeeded by his eldest son, Sir John Lees (1816–1892), who died 19 June 1892, and whose eldest son, Harcourt James, was the fourth baronet.

== Works ==
Lees published several pamphlets, chiefly in support of Protestant ascendency. They are distinguished by extreme animation of style.

- The Antidote, or Nouvelles à la Main. Recommended to the serious attention of the Right Hon. W. C. Plunket and other advocates of unrestricted civil and religious liberty, Dublin, 1819, 8vo; reprinted with a supplement entitled ‘L’Abeja, or a Bee among the Evangelicals,’ Dublin, 1820, 8vo.
- Strictures on the Rev. Lieutenant Stennett’s Hints to Sir Harcourt Lees by the Anti-Jacobin British Review for September; to which is prefixed A Short Introduction, containing a most important Letter from a Gentleman educated and intended for the Popish Priesthood, Dublin, 1820, 8vo.
- The Mystery: being a short but decisive counter-reply to the few friendly hints of the Rev. Charles B. Stennett, at present an officiating priest in the Religious College of Maynooth, and late a lieutenant of grenadiers in the North York Regiment of Militia, Dublin, 1820, 8vo; 14th edit. 1821.
- A Letter to Mr. Wilberforce, containing some Reflections on a late Address of Lord John Russell’s and the Past and Present Conduct of the Whigs, Dublin, 1820.
- An Address to the King’s Friends throughout the British Empire on the present Awful and Critical State of Great Britain, containing just and necessary Strictures on a late Speech of Henry Brougham, esq., in the House of Lords in defence of the Queen, Dublin, 1820, 8vo; 11th edit. 1821.
- A Cursory View of the Present State of Ireland, Dublin, 1821, 8vo.
- Nineteen Pages of Advice to the Protestant Freemen and Freeholders of the City of Dublin, containing Observations on the Speeches and Conduct of a late Aggregate Meeting in Liffey St. Chapel, the first of June; recommended to the deep and serious consideration of every Protestant in Ireland, Dublin, 1821, 8vo.
- Most Important. Trial of Sir Harcourt Lees, Bart. Before Chief Justice B4 and Serjeant Flummery on Saturday, the 11 January 1823, by a jury of Special-Dust Churchmen, on charges of Barratry and Eavesdropping, Dublin, 8vo.
- Theological Extracts selected from a late Letter written by a Popish Prelate to his Grace the Archbishop of Dublin, with Observations on the same, and a well-merited and equally well-applied literary flagellation of the titular shoulders of this mild and humble Minister of the Gospel; with a complete exposure of his friend the Pope and the entire body of holy impostors, Dublin, n.d.

== Arms ==
Coat of arms of Harcourt Lees
Crest A dexter hand couped above the wrist and erect Proper grasping a crescent Or. Escutcheon Azure a fess chequy Argent and Sable between six cross-crosslets fitchée three in the chief and three in the nombril points Or and three billets two in the honour and one in the base points of the second. Motto Exegi; An Honest Man’s The Noblest Work of God.

Baronetage of the United Kingdom
Preceded by John Lees	Baronet (of Blackrock); 1811–1852	Succeeded by John Lees
