= Hugh Boyd (politician) =

Hugh Boyd (1765–1795) was an Irish politician.

Boyd was educated at Trinity College Dublin. From 1794 until his death, he was MP for County Antrim.
