= Randalstown (Parliament of Ireland constituency) =

Pre-1801 Irish constituency

Coordinates: 54.750°N 6.320°W

- Former borough constituency for the Irish House of Commons
- County: County Antrim
- Borough: Randalstown

–1801
- Seats: 2
- Replaced by: Disfranchised

Randalstown was a borough constituency which elected two MPs representing Randalstown, County Antrim, to the Irish House of Commons, the house of representatives of the Kingdom of Ireland. It was disenfranchised by the Acts of Union 1800.

== Members of Parliament 1692–1801 ==
Election	First MP		Second MP
1692	Robert Dixon		Edmond Stafford
1695	Henry O'Neill		Edmond Stafford
1697	Charles O'Neill		Edmond Stafford
September 1703	Robert Dixon		Edmond Stafford
1703	Timothy Armitage		Edmond Stafford
1713	Charles O'Neill		Robert Dixon
1715	James Stevenson		Robert Dixon
1727	Charles O'Neill		Henry O'Hara
1746	Charles O'Neill		Clotworthy O'Neill
1749	Charles O'Neill		William Sharman
1760	Charles O'Neill		Sir Kildare Borrowes, 5th Bt
1761	Charles O'Neill		John O'Neill
1771	St John O'Neill		John O'Neill
1776	James St John Jeffereyes		John O'Neill
1781	Lord Rawdon	Patriot	John O'Neill
October 1783	Richard Jackson		John O'Neill
1783	Michael Smith		John Dunn
1790	John O'Neill		John Dunn
1791	Michael Smith		John Dunn
1794	Edward Corry		John Dunn
January 1798	Isaac Corry		George Jackson
1798	James McClelland		George Jackson
1801	Constituency disenfranchised		
