= Edward Jones-Agnew =

Irish politician (1767–1805)

Edward Jones-Agnew (1767-1805) was an Irish politician.

Jones-Agnew was educated at Trinity College Dublin. From 1792 to 1797, he was MP for County Antrim.
