= Postmasters General of Ireland =

Former government posts in Ireland

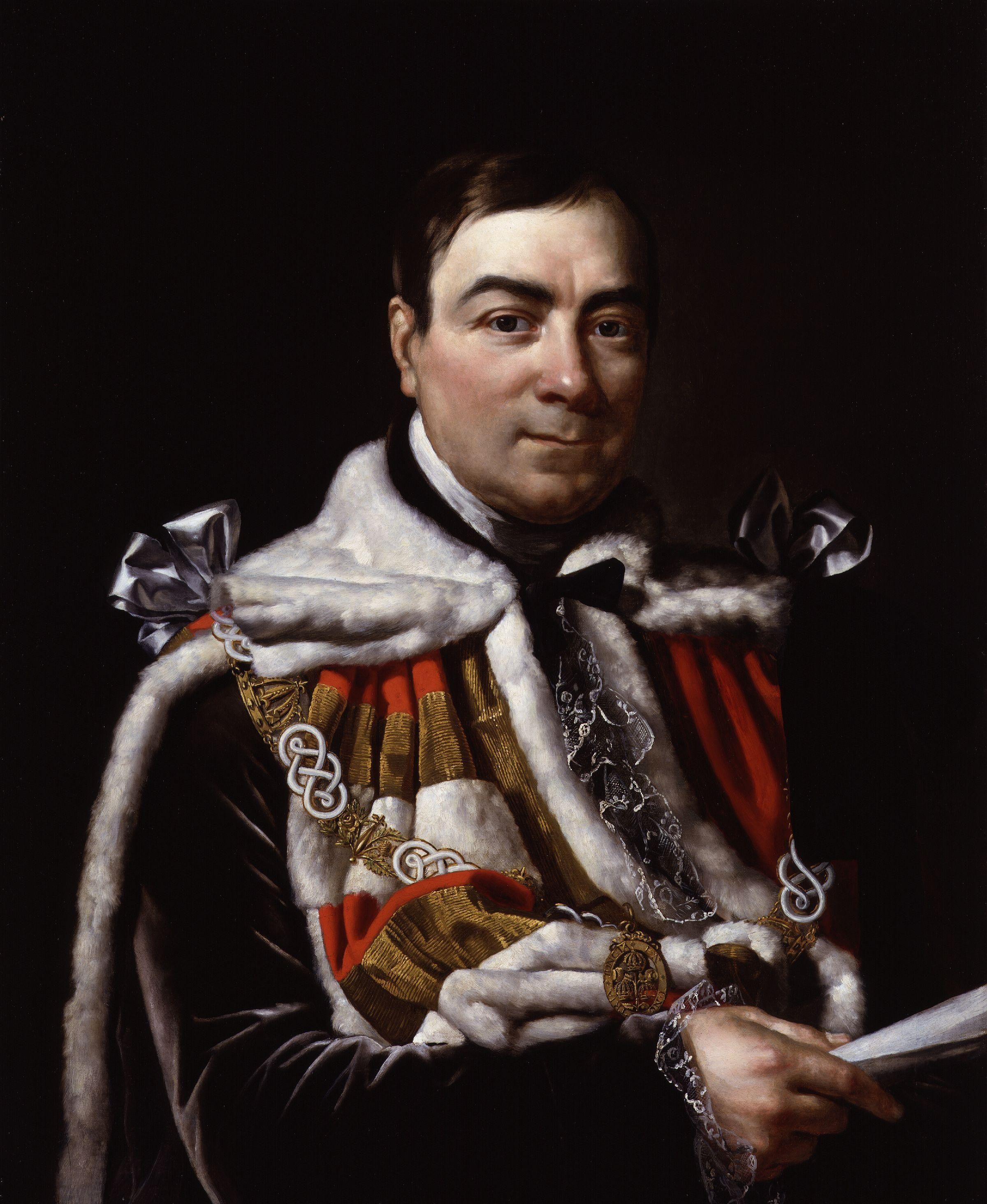
Richard Trench, 2nd Earl of Clancarty, non-absentee Postmaster General of Ireland

The Postmasters General of Ireland, held by two people simultaneously, was a new appointment set up as part of the establishment of the Irish Post Office independent from that of Great Britain, by the Post Office Act 1783, in May 1784. The post lasted nearly fifty years. The act was not repealed upon the Act of Union 1800 but in 1831.

== Post Office Act 1783 ==
For the better support of your Majesty's government, and the convenience of trade ... be it enacted ... that as soon as conveniently may be there shall be one general letter-office and post-office established in some convenient place within the city of Dublin, with sub-offices throughout this kingdom from whence all letter and packets whatsoever to or from places within this kingdom, or beyond the seas, may be with speed and expedition sent, received and dispatched; and that the person, or persons from time to time to be appointed by the King's Majesty, his letters patent under the great seal of Ireland by the name and stile of his Majesty's Post Master General of Ireland, and that there shall be a secretary, a treasurer or receiver general an accountant general and a resident surveyor of the said general post-office; and also a comptroller of the sorting office thereof, to be appointed, made and constituted in like manner by letter patent under the great seal of Ireland.

== History ==
While both the post offices of Great Britain and Ireland had two postmasters general, in Ireland the assent of only one was required for decisions as opposed to the assent of both being necessary in Great Britain. Besides confirming the monopoly for carrying letters in Ireland and giving the right to establish a four-mile limit penny post in Dublin, one of the postmasters general's duties was to measure the post roads in Ireland. During the time the postmasters general of Ireland existed profits in the Irish office increased from £15,000 in 1786 to £108,000 in 1831.

Date	First Postmaster General	Second Postmaster General
16 July 1784	James Agar, 1st Viscount Clifden	William Ponsonby, 1st Baron Ponsonby
1 January 1789	Charles Loftus, 1st Viscount Loftus	William Ponsonby, 1st Baron Ponsonby
18 July 1789	Charles Loftus, 1st Viscount Loftus	Charles Coote
14 July 1797	Charles Loftus, 1st Viscount Loftus	Charles Moore, 1st Marquess of Drogheda
19 April 1806	Richard Hely-Hutchinson, 1st Earl of Donoughmore	Lord Henry FitzGerald
2 May 1807	Charles O'Neill, 1st Earl O'Neill	Richard Trench, 2nd Earl of Clancarty
1 December 1809	Charles O'Neill, 1st Earl O'Neill	Laurence Parsons, 2nd Earl of Rosse

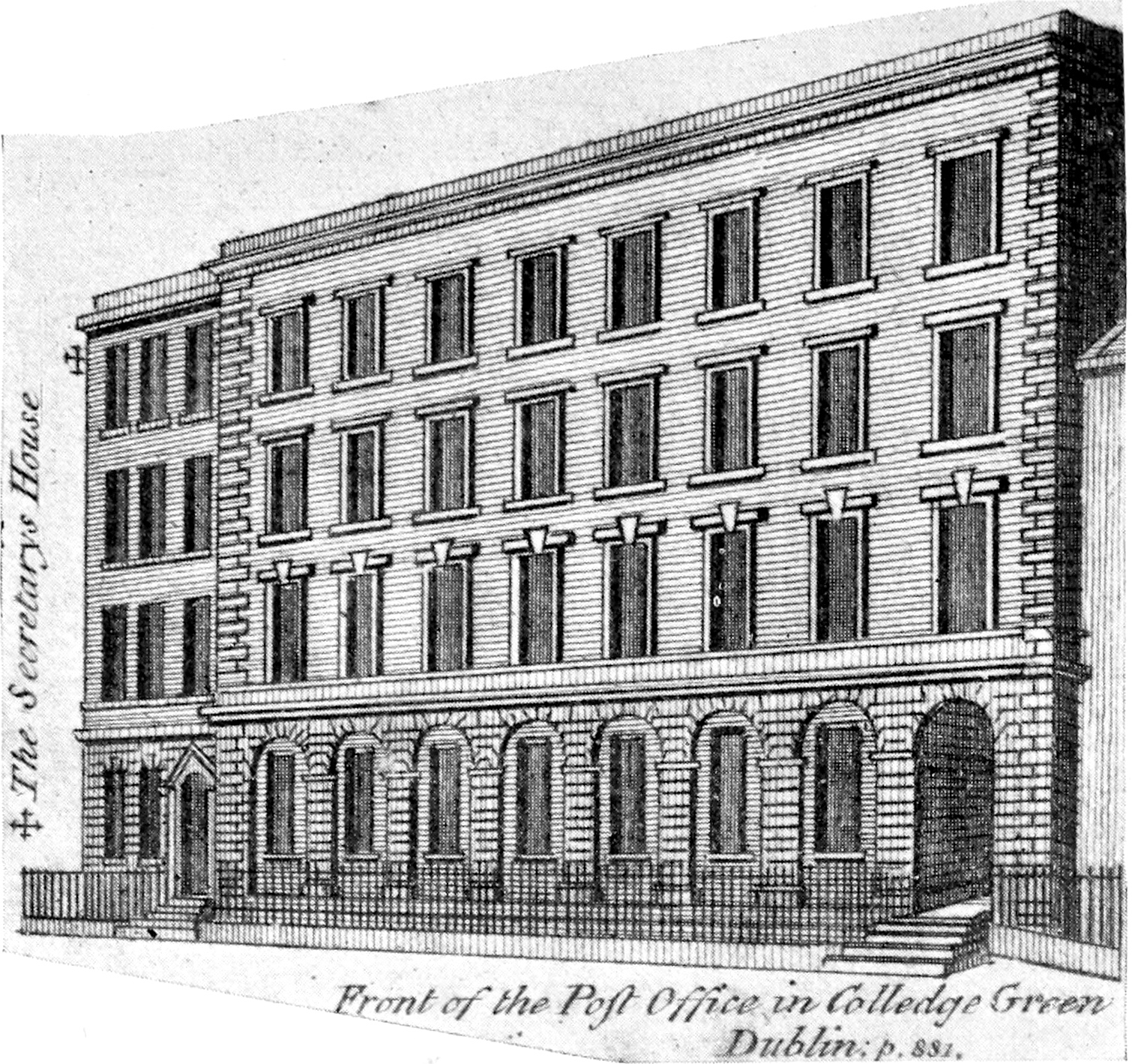
Illustration of GPO in College Green with PO secretary's house on the left side from 1770s until the new GPO was completed in Sackville Street

Most of the postmasters were habitual absentees except for Richard Trench, 2nd Earl of Clancarty, who, concerned by the out-dated postal system in Ireland, sent Edward Lees, Secretary of the Irish Post Office, to London to study their modern methods of operations.

When the foundation-stone for the new General Post Office in Dublin was laid by the Lord Lieutenant of Ireland, Charles Whitworth, 1st Earl Whitworth, on 12 August 1814, the ceremony was attended by the incumbent Postmasters General, Charles O'Neill, 1st Earl O'Neill and Laurence Parsons, 2nd Earl of Rosse.

== Termination ==
Although the Act of Union 1800 abolished the separate Kingdom of Ireland, Ireland maintained a separate post office until the office of Postmaster General of Ireland was abolished and consolidated into the new single post of the Postmaster General of the United Kingdom on 6 April 1831 under the Postmaster-General Act 1831.

== See also ==
- Minister for Posts and Telegraphs
