= Cavendish =

Cavendish may refer to:

== People ==
- Cavendish (surname), including a list of people
- Cavendish (given name), a list of people
- House of Cavendish, a British aristocratic family
- Cavendish (author) (1831–1899), pen name of Henry Jones, English author on card games and tennis

== Places ==
=== Australia ===
- County of Cavendish, Queensland
- Cavendish Road, Brisbane, Queensland
- Cavendish, Victoria

=== Canada ===
- Cavendish, Alberta
- Cavendish, Newfoundland and Labrador
- Cavendish, a former township, subsequently merged and renamed to form Trent Lakes, Ontario
- Cavendish, Prince Edward Island
- Cavendish Beach, Prince Edward Island

=== England ===
- Cavendish, Suffolk
- Cavendish Square, London
- Cavendish Bridge

=== New Zealand ===
- Mount Cavendish, Christchurch

=== United States ===
- Cavendish, Idaho
- Cavendish, Vermont, a town
  - Cavendish (CDP), Vermont, the central village of the town
- Fort Cavendish, Illinois, British name for the captured French Fort de Chartres

=== Outer space ===
- Cavendish (crater), a lunar crater

== Academic facilities ==
- Cavendish Laboratory at the University of Cambridge
- Cavendish School (disambiguation), various schools
- Cavendish Hall, one of the University of Nottingham Halls of Residence
- Cavendish University Zambia, a private university in Lusaka, Zambia

== Other uses ==
- Cavendish banana, the dominant commercial variety of banana
- Cavendish tobacco, a process of cutting and curing tobacco
- Cavendish Hotel, London
- Cavendish Invitational, high-stakes bridge tournament currently held in Monaco
- Cavendish Motor Services, a bus company operating several routes in East Sussex, England
- Cavendish (TV series), a 2019 sitcom set in Cavendish, Prince Edward Island, Canada
- Diana Cavendish, a character in the Little Witch Academia Japanese anime franchise

== See also ==
- Cavendish's Dikdik (Madoqua kirkii cavendishi), an animal subspecies
- Cavendish Farms, Cavendish Agri Services, or Cavendish Produce, subsidiaries of Canadian conglomerate J. D. Irving
- "Cavendish Foods", a fictional supermarket chain on the British sitcom To the Manor Born
- Cavendish Tribe, original name of Devonshire Parish, Bermuda
