= John Cavendish (disambiguation) =

John Cavendish (1346–1381) was a British nobleman and politician.

John Cavendish may also refer to:

- John Cavendish, 5th Baron Chesham (1916–1989), British Conservative politician
- Lord John Cavendish (1732–1796), English politician
- Jonathan Cavendish, producer of films such as Bridget Jones's Diary
