= St Mary the Virgin's Church, Cavendish =

St Mary's Church, Cavendish
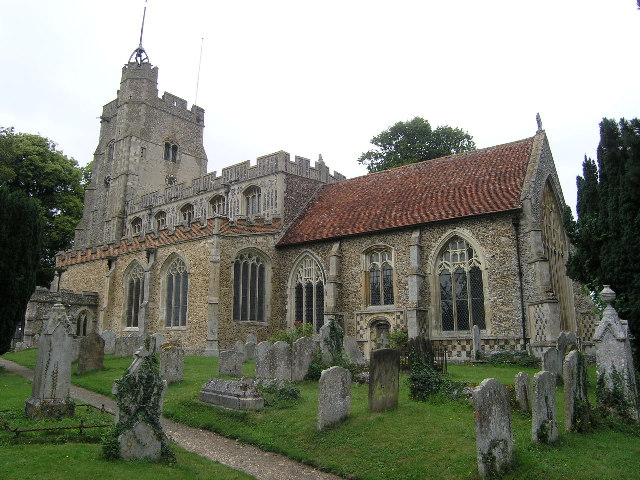
- St Mary the Virgin's Church
- St Mary's Church, Cavendish
- 52°5′14.69″N 0°37′59.26″E
- OS grid reference: TL 80513 46549
- Location: Cavendish, Suffolk
- Country: England
- Denomination: Church of England

History
- Dedication: St Mary

Architecture
- Functional status: Parish church
- Heritage designation: Grade I listed

Administration
- Diocese: Diocese of St Edmundsbury and Ipswich
- Archdeaconry: Suffolk
- Deanery: Clare
- Parish: Cavendish

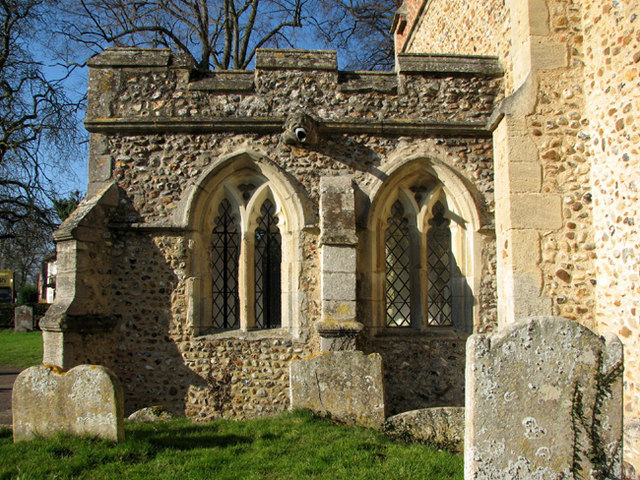
The porch

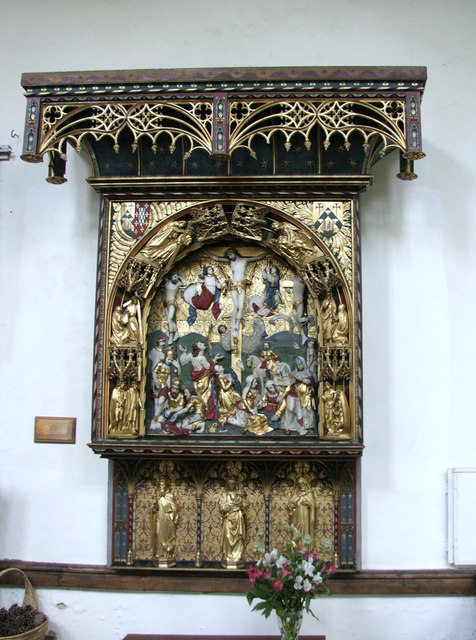
The reredos

St Mary the Virgin's Church, Cavendish is a Grade I listed parish church in the Church of England in Cavendish, Suffolk.

== History ==
A Saxon church at Cavendish is mentioned in the Domesday Book. The church is mostly 14th-century, with building dating from about 1300 to about 1485, with some 19th-century additions and alterations.

The oldest parts of the church, dating from about 1300, are the Tower, the Porch and the lower parts of the walls of the aisles. In 1350 the South aisle walls were rebuilt to their present height and new windows were inserted.

Simon Jenkins awarded the church 1 star in his England's Thousand Best Churches.

== Exterior ==
The exterior of the church is dressed with flint. Above the parapet is a stair turret. The 14th-century tower is surmounted by a lantern. The building of the chancel was made possible by a bequest from Sir John Cavendish in the 1380s. During the Peasants' Revolt Sir John's son, also named John, was responsible for the death of Wat Tyler. As a result, Sir John was lynched by his parishioners. He reached the church where he pleaded sanctuary by grasping the handle of the church door, but was taken to the market place at Bury St. Edmunds and beheaded by a mob led by Jack Straw on 15 June 1381. He was buried in Bury St. Edmunds. His bequest to St Mary's was made by way of recompense. The nave was probably the work of Reginald Ely, designer of King's College Chapel in Cambridge.

== Interior ==
The church contains a 16th-century Flemish reredos, in the North aisle, showing the crucifixion. It is set in a frame by Sir Ninian Comper.

Until the late 1530s, a chantry altar probably stood in the church, perhaps for a guild. There is a squint that would have allowed the chantry priest a view of the high altar. The canopied niche to the right of the chest contains a modern image of the Madonna and child. The altar was replaced by a tomb chest for Sir George Colt, who died in 1570.

There is a large roundel memorial in the South aisle to Sue Ryder and Leonard Cheshire, best known for their war relief work in the years after 1945. At the east end of the south aisle is the tomb chest for Sir George Colt, who died in 1570. In the early years of the 21st century. The resulting interior is "a fit-for-purpose Anglican worship space which is clean, bright and comfortable".

=== Organ ===
The church has a two manual pipe organ dating from 1884 by Henry Jones and Sons. A specification of the organ can be found on the National Pipe Organ Register.

=== Bells ===
Bells of St Mary's Cavendish
Bell	Date	Note	Diameter	Founder	Weight		
Bell	Date	Note	Diameter	Founder	long measure	lb	kg
Treble	1779	D#	28.38 in (72.1 cm)	William Mears	4 long cwt 2 qr 6 lb	510	231
2nd	1930	C#	29.38 in (74.6 cm)	John Taylor & Co	5 long cwt 0 qr 4 lb	564	256
3rd	1779	B	32.88 in (83.5 cm)	William Mears	6 long cwt 1 qr 14 lb	714	324
4th	1930	A#	33.88 in (86.1 cm)	John Taylor & Co	7 long cwt 3 qr 0 lb	868	394
5th	1930	G#	36.25 in (92.1 cm)	John Taylor & Co	8 long cwt 3 qr 24 lb	1,004	455
Tenor	1869	F#	40.50 in (102.9 cm)	John Warner & Sons	11 long cwt 0 qr 21 lb	1,253	568

== Administration ==
The Parish of Cavendish is part of the Stour Valley Team Ministry, along with the Parishes of:

- St Peter and St Paul's Church, Clare
- St Mary's Church, Poslingford
- St John the Baptist's Church, Stoke-by-Clare
- St Leonard's Church, Wixoe
- All Saints Church, Hundon
