= Cavendish family =

British noble family

Cavendish
- Noble house
- Arms: Sable, three buck's heads cabossed argent
- Country: England; Ireland; United Kingdom
- Origin: Normandy
- Founded: 1346; 680 years ago
- Founder: Sir John Cavendish
- Current head: Peregrine Cavendish, 12th Duke of Devonshire
- Titles: List: Duke of Devonshire; Duke of Newcastle; Marquess of Hartington; Marquess of Newcastle-upon-Tyne; Earl of Devonshire; Earl of Burlington; Earl of Newcastle-upon-Tyne; Viscount Mansfield; Baron Clifford; Baron Cavendish; Baron Cavendish of Keighley; Baron Waterpark; Baron Ogle; Baron Chesham; Prime Minister of the United Kingdom
- Connected families: Cavendish-Bentinck; Churchill family; Kennedy family; Mitford family; Marquess of Salisbury; Sercombe family; Spencer family; Duke of Westminster; House of Yale
- Motto: Cavendo tutus ('Safe through caution')
- Estate: List: Chatsworth House; Hardwick Hall; Burlington House; Devonshire House; Lismore Castle; Bolsover Castle; Bothal Castle; Pevensey Castle; Londesborough Hall; Bolton Abbey; Latimer House; Chiswick House; Ogle Castle; Compton Place; Staveley Hall; Holker Hall; Welbeck Abbey; Doveridge Hall; Old Devonshire House

The Cavendish (or de Cavendish) family (/ˈkævəndɪʃ/ KAV-ən-dish; /ˈkændɪʃ/ KAN-dish) is a British noble family of Anglo-Norman origin, despite their Anglo-Saxon name. They rose to their highest prominence as Duke of Devonshire and Duke of Newcastle.

Leading branches have held high offices in English and later British politics, especially since the Glorious Revolution of 1688 and the participation of William Cavendish (then Earl of Devonshire) in the Invitation to William, though the family appears to date to the Norman Conquest of England, with Cavendish being used, with various spellings, as a surname per se since the beginning of the 13th century. As a place-name, it is first recorded in 1086.

== Early history ==
As a toponym referring to Cavendish, Suffolk, is first recorded as Kavandisc in 1086 in the Domesday Book, meaning of 'Cafna's pasture', from the personal byname Cafa/Cafna (from caf 'bold, daring'), and edisc 'enclosed pasture'.

By 1201, it was in use as a surname, de Cavendis,^{[note a]} recurring in 1242 as Cavenedis, and again in 1302 as de Cavendish.

The Cavendish noble family has generally been considered to be a branch of the same Anglo-Norman baronial lineage as Gernon^{[note b]} and de Montfichet^{[note c]} though not without some critics of this hypothesis.

The family, until the 15th century only middling gentry, but with financial roles at court, rose to prominence under the Tudor dynasty, when Sir William Cavendish was a courtier who made a great deal of money handling the disposal of the spoils of the Dissolution of the Monasteries. This was augmented in the reign of Elizabeth I, after he became the much younger Bess of Hardwick's second husband. It was probably she who persuaded Sir William to sell his lands in the south of England, around the manor of Cavendish, Suffolk, and buy the Chatsworth estate in her native Derbyshire.

Bess outlived Sir William by almost fifty years and dominated the lives of her Cavendish children by force of personality, and her money. The family, and that of Bess's wealthy last husband, George Talbot, 6th Earl of Shrewsbury, were marked by fractious relationships, and Sir William's oldest son Sir Henry Cavendish was disinherited by Bess, with the bulk of her wealth going instead to Sir William's second son William Cavendish, 1st Earl of Devonshire, who received his title from James I in 1618, supposedly paying £10,000 for it.

The philosopher Thomas Hobbes was employed as a tutor by the Cavendish family mainly for William Cavendish, 2nd Earl of Devonshire; the two went on an early Grand Tour of Europe from 1610. William Cavendish, 3rd Earl of Devonshire was a prominent Royalist who spent some years in exile during the English Civil War, having been impeached and with his estates sequestrated until the English Restoration.

William Cavendish, 1st Duke of Newcastle, Bess's grandson by her third Cavendish son, was also a leading Royalist, unlike his cousin William fighting in the wars as an important but apparently not very good general. He also went into exile and remained in favour for the first years of the Restoration, but then had a distant relationship with the court. He was England's leading authority on the training of fighting horses.

== From the Glorious Revolution onward ==
After missing nation-leading and internationally definitive largesse and empire-building in Charles II's five-peer acronym of the Cabal ministry, William Cavendish, Earl of Devonshire, was the first of the name to rise to duke. He co-wrote the 1688 Invitation to William to exclude Catholics from the monarchy, which set in motion the Glorious Revolution in that year (and which also ultimately had the result of shifting more power to Parliament). The Invitation's authors were later known as "the Immortal Seven". This pre-dated the Spencer-Churchills' centrality under campaigns (most of all the Battle of Culloden) against the Catholic pretenders to the throne.

High appointments were often won by senior title holders and some juniors among the Cavendishes, from 1688 until about 1887, and marked the family's ascendancy, along with the Marquesses of Salisbury and the Earls of Derby. The notable lines descend from Sir John of Cavendish in the county of Suffolk (c. 1346–1381). Other peerages included the Dukedom of Newcastle; Barony of Waterpark (County Cork, Ireland); the Barony of Chesham (in Buckinghamshire); and through a daughter marrying into the Bentinck family (leading to combined surnames), the Dukedom of Portland (a title which ceased in 1990, and most of the wealth of which is in the Howard de Walden Estate, which has kept minor, overarching interests in and reviews changes across most of central Marylebone, London).

Concessions to populists of post-imperial meritocracy movements shifted power to industrialism and to the House of Commons. The 1911, 1958, 1963, and 1999 transformations of the House of Lords permanently ended key influence by Cavendish and many other British noble families. Under primogeniture, the senior branches of these families still dominate in inter-family (relative) wealth and titles.

The head of the modern family is Peregrine Cavendish, 12th Duke of Devonshire, whose Georgian mansion, Chatsworth House, in the Peak District attracts many visitors with its gardens, iconic high-jet fountain, Capability Brown grounds, and fine-art collection. Among its past urban assets with lasting influence, this branch of the family had a large house in London, on which many grand apartments and houses now stand, including Devonshire Square.

The family seat is Chatsworth House, a Grade I listed property in Edensor, near Bakewell, part of the Chatsworth Estate. According to the Estate website, "Chatsworth is very much home to the 12th Duke and Duchess, [who] are intensely involved in the day to day running of the business and upkeep of" the House. This area has been the home of the Cavendish family since 1549.

== Notable members ==
- Sir John Cavendish (c. 1346–1381)
  - Sir John Cavendish
    - William Cavendish (died 1433)
      - Thomas Cavendish (died 1477)
        - Thomas Cavendish (died 1524)
          - George Cavendish (1500 – c.1562), English writer, biographer of Cardinal Wolsey
            - William Cavendish
              - Michael Cavendish (c.1565–1628), English composer
          - William Cavendish (1505–1557), English courtier; married to Bess of Hardwick
            - Henry Cavendish (1550–1616)
              - Henry Cavendish (died 1624), illegitimate son
                - Francis Cavendish (1618–1650)
                  - Henry Cavendish (1649–1698)
                    - William Cavendish (1682–1698)
                      - Sir Henry Cavendish, 1st Baronet (1707–1776), Anglo-Irish politician
                        - Sir Henry Cavendish, 2nd Baronet (1732–1804), Anglo-Irish politician; married to Sarah Cavendish, 1st Baroness Waterpark (1740–1807)
                          - Richard Cavendish, 2nd Baron Waterpark (1765–1830)
                            - Henry Cavendish, 3rd Baron Waterpark (1793–1863), MP
                              - Henry Cavendish, 4th Baron Waterpark (1839–1912), sportsman
                            - Richard Cavendish (1794–1876), MP, member of the Canterbury Association
                          - George Cavendish (1766–1849), MP
                          - Augustus Cavendish-Bradshaw (1768–1832), MP
            - William Cavendish, 1st Earl of Devonshire (1552–1626)
              - William Cavendish, 2nd Earl of Devonshire (c. 1590–1628)
                - William Cavendish, 3rd Earl of Devonshire (1617–1684)
                  - William Cavendish, 1st Duke of Devonshire (1640–1707)
                    - William Cavendish, 2nd Duke of Devonshire (1672–1729)
                      - William Cavendish, 3rd Duke of Devonshire (1698–1755), Lord Lieutenant of Ireland 1737–44
                        - William Cavendish, 4th Duke of Devonshire (1720–1764), briefly Prime Minister of Great Britain
                          - William Cavendish, 5th Duke of Devonshire (1748–1811); married firstly to Georgiana Cavendish, Duchess of Devonshire (1757–1806), political organizer; married secondly to Elizabeth Cavendish, Duchess of Devonshire (1758–1824)
                            - Georgiana Howard, Countess of Carlisle (1783–1858)
                            - Harriet Leveson-Gower, Countess Granville (1785–1862)
                            - William Cavendish, 6th Duke of Devonshire (1790–1858), Lord Chamberlain to King William IV. The Cavendish banana is named after him.
                          - Lady Dorothy Cavendish (1750–1794), Duchess of Portland, 3× great grandmother of Queen Elizabeth II
                          - Lord Richard Cavendish (1752–1781), MP
                          - George Augustus Henry Cavendish, 1st Earl of Burlington (1754–1834)
                            - William Cavendish (1783–1812)
                              - William Cavendish, 7th Duke of Devonshire (1808–91), Chancellor of the University of Cambridge 1861–91, for whom the Cavendish Laboratory is named
                                - Spencer Cavendish, 8th Duke of Devonshire (1833–1908), British Liberal statesman; married to Louisa Montagu, Dowager Duchess of Manchester (1832–1911), the "Double Duchess"
                                - Lord Frederick Cavendish (1836–1882), British Liberal politician; married to Lucy Cavendish (1841–1925), namesake of Lucy Cavendish College, Cambridge
                                - Lord Edward Cavendish (1838–1891), soldier and politician
                                  - Victor Cavendish, 9th Duke of Devonshire (1868–1938), British politician, Governor General of Canada 1916–21; married to Evelyn Cavendish, Duchess of Devonshire (1870–1960), Mistress of the Robes to Queen Mary
                                    - Edward Cavendish, 10th Duke of Devonshire (1895–1950), Minister in Winston Churchill's wartime cabinet; married to Mary Cavendish, Duchess of Devonshire (1895–1988), Mistress of the Robes to Elizabeth II
                                      - William John Robert Cavendish, Marquess of Hartington (1917–1944), killed in action, Belgium; married to Kathleen Cavendish, Marchioness of Hartington aka Kick Kennedy (1920–1948), sister of U.S. president John F. Kennedy
                                      - Andrew Cavendish, 11th Duke of Devonshire (1920–2004), British government minister; married to Deborah Cavendish, Duchess of Devonshire (1920–2014), Mitford sister and writer
                                        - Lady Emma Cavendish (born 1943)
                                          - Stella Tennant (1970–2020), model and fashion designer
                                        - Peregrine Cavendish, 12th Duke of Devonshire (born 1944), horse racing devotee
                                          - William Cavendish, Earl of Burlington aka Bill Burlington (born 1969), professional photographer
                                  - Lord Richard Cavendish (1871–1946), author, magistrate and politician
                                    - Richard Edward Osborne Cavendish (1917–1972)
                                      - Hugh Cavendish, Baron Cavendish of Furness (born 1941)
                              - Lord George Henry Cavendish (1810–1880), British politician
                            - George Henry Compton Cavendish (1784–1809), English politician
                            - Henry Frederick Compton Cavendish (1789–1873), general
                              - William Henry Frederick Cavendish (1817–1881)
                                - Cecil Charles Cavendish (1855–1931)
                                  - Brigadier Ronald Valentine Cecil Cavendish (1896–1943)
                                    - Robin Francis Cavendish (1930-1994), disability rights activist
                                      - Jonathon Stewart Cavendish (b. 1959), film producer
                            - Charles Cavendish, 1st Baron Chesham (1793–1863), Liberal politician
                              - William Cavendish, 2nd Baron Chesham (1815–1882)
                                - Charles Cavendish, 3rd Baron Chesham (1850–1907)
                                  - John Cavendish, 4th Baron Chesham (1894–1952)
                                    - John Cavendish, 5th Baron Chesham (1916–1989)
                                      - Nicholas Cavendish, 6th Baron Chesham (1941–2009)
                                        - Charles Cavendish, 7th Baron Chesham (born 1974)
                        - Lord George Augustus Cavendish (c. 1727–1794), British politician
                        - Lord Frederick Cavendish (1729–1803), field marshal
                        - Lord John Cavendish (1734–1796), English politician
                      - Lord James Cavendish (1701–1741)
                      - Lord Charles Cavendish (1704–1783)
                        - Henry Cavendish (1731–1810) scientist, known for the Cavendish experiment
                    - Lord Henry Cavendish (1673–1700)
                    - Lord James Cavendish (c. 1678–1751), married in 1708 to Anne Yale, daughter of Elihu Yale
            - Sir Charles Cavendish (c. 1553–1617)
              - William Cavendish, 1st Duke of Newcastle (1592–1676), English soldier, politician and writer; married to Margaret Cavendish, Duchess of Newcastle (1623–1673), English writer and scientist
                - Jane Cavendish (1621–1669), poet and playwright
                - Charles Cavendish, Viscount Mansfield (c. 1626–1659)
                - Henry Cavendish, 2nd Duke of Newcastle (1630–1691)
                  - Elizabeth Monck, Duchess of Albemarle (1654–1734)
                  - Henry Cavendish, Earl of Ogle (1659–1680), first husband of Elizabeth Seymour, Duchess of Somerset
                  - Margaret Holles, Duchess of Newcastle-upon-Tyne (1661–1716)
                    - Henrietta Harley, Countess of Oxford (1694–1755)
                      - Margaret Bentinck, Duchess of Portland (1715–1785)
                        - William Cavendish-Bentinck, 3rd Duke of Portland (1738–1809), ancestor of the Cavendish-Bentinck family
                          - Cavendish-Bentinck family
                - Elizabeth Egerton, Countess of Bridgwater (1626–1663), writer
              - Sir Charles Cavendish (c. 1594–1654), MP

The explorer Thomas Cavendish "the Navigator" (1555–1592) was descended from Roger Cavendish, Sir John Cavendish's brother.

The 3rd to 9th Dukes of Portland were descended from the Cavendish family through the female line, and took the surname Cavendish-Bentinck or a variant thereof. Their principal seat, Welbeck Abbey in Nottinghamshire, came to them through the Cavendish connection.

== Notes ==
^{a} Borne by one Simon de Cavendis in the Suffolk Records of Pleas before the King (specifically King John)
^{b} Of Essex, Suffolk, and Derby; originally Guernon of Normandy.
^{c} Of Essex, Middlesex, and London, also spelled Mountfitchet; originally Montfiquet of Normandy.
