= Charles Cavendish =

Charles Cavendish may refer to:

- Sir Charles Cavendish (landowner, born 1553) (1553–1617), English landowner and architect
- Sir Charles Cavendish (Nottingham MP) (1594–1654), English politician, son of the above
- Charles Cavendish (general, died 1643) (1620–1643), English Royalist general, great-nephew of Sir Charles Cavendish (1553–1617)
- Charles Cavendish, Viscount Mansfield (1626–1659), English Royalist politician, grandson of Sir Charles Cavendish (1553–1617)
- Lord Charles Cavendish (politician, born 1704) (1704–1783), English politician, great-great-nephew of Charles Cavendish (1620–1643)
- Charles Cavendish, 1st Baron Chesham (1793–1863), English politician, great-great-nephew of the above
- Charles William Cavendish (1822–1890), English Anglican priest, later Catholic convert and secretary of the Society for the Propagation of the Faith
- Charles Cavendish, 3rd Baron Chesham (1850–1907), English politician, grandson of the 1st Baron Chesham
- Lord Charles Cavendish (1905–1944), English nobleman, great-great-nephew of the 1st Baron Chesham
- Charles Cavendish, 7th Baron Chesham (born 1974), English nobleman, great-great-grandson of the 3rd Baron Chesham
- Doctor Charles Cavendish, the main antagonist of Arkham Asylum: A Serious House on Serious Earth

== See also ==
- Charles Cavendish Boyle (1849–1916), English colonial administrator, 1879–1911
- Cavendish (disambiguation)
