= Listed buildings in Cavendish, Suffolk =

Historic structures in Suffolk, England

Cavendish is a village and civil parish in the West Suffolk District of Suffolk, England. It contains 67 listed buildings that are recorded in the National Heritage List for England. Of these one is grade I, one is grade II* and 65 are grade II.

This list is based on the information retrieved online from Historic England.

== Key ==
Grade	Criteria
I	Buildings that are of exceptional interest
II*	Particularly important buildings of more than special interest
II	Buildings that are of special interest

== Listing ==
Name	Grade	Location	Type	Completed (Note: The date given is the date used by Historic England as significant for the initial building or that of an important part in the structure's description.)	Date designated	Grid ref. (Note: The grid reference is based on the British national grid reference system, sometimes known as OSGB36, used by the Ordnance Survey.) Geo-coordinates	Notes	Entry number (Note: The "List Entry Number" is a unique number assigned to each listed building and scheduled monument by Historic England.)	Image	Wikidata
Barn at Colts Hall Farm	II				9 April 1990	TL7928047683; 52°05′54″N 0°36′57″E		1264667	Upload Photo	Q26555343
Barn to Houghton Hall	II				20 May 1974	TL7859546537; 52°05′18″N 0°36′19″E		1031778	Upload Photo	Q26283165
Church of St Mary	I		church building		19 December 1961	TL8051346549; 52°05′16″N 0°38′00″E		1031774	Church of St Mary More images	Q15979404
Colt's Hall	II				20 May 1974	TL7932947676; 52°05′54″N 0°37′00″E		1376674	Upload Photo	Q26657205
Ducks Hall	II				20 May 1974	TL8101947845; 52°05′58″N 0°38′29″E		1031777	Upload Photo	Q26283163
Houghton Hall	II		house		20 May 1974	TL7864446585; 52°05′20″N 0°36′22″E		1376675	Houghton Hall More images	Q26657206
Robs Farmhouse	II				20 May 1974	TL7967448239; 52°06′12″N 0°37′19″E		1376673	Upload Photo	Q26657204
Scotts Farmhouse	II				20 May 1974	TL7956646238; 52°05′07″N 0°37′10″E		1031775	Upload Photo	Q26283161
Wales Farmhouse	II				20 May 1974	TL7965249016; 52°06′37″N 0°37′20″E		1031776	Wales Farmhouse More images	Q26283162
Blacklands	II	Cavendish Lane			19 December 1961	TL8105246972; 52°05′29″N 0°38′29″E		1031779	Upload Photo	Q26283166
Two Barns to Blacklands	II	Cavendish Lane			19 December 1961	TL8100846941; 52°05′28″N 0°38′27″E		1193260	Upload Photo	Q26487916
Cherry Tree Cottage	II	Clarks Yard			20 May 1974	TL8064646523; 52°05′15″N 0°38′07″E		1376676	Upload Photo	Q26657207
Sunny Cottages	II	1, 2, High Street			20 May 1974	TL8078246537; 52°05′16″N 0°38′14″E		1376662	Upload Photo	Q26657194
Almore House	II	High Street			10 February 1955	TL8056446498; 52°05′15″N 0°38′03″E		1193453	Almore House More images	Q26488113
Beehive Peacocks and Melcott	II	High Street			19 December 1961	TL8087846530; 52°05′15″N 0°38′19″E		1031755	Upload Photo	Q26283142
Canford House and St Ronans	II	High Street			20 May 1974	TL8065546507; 52°05′15″N 0°38′07″E		1031752	Canford House and St Ronans More images	Q26283139
Cavendish House	II	High Street			19 December 1961	TL8059046517; 52°05′15″N 0°38′04″E		1031785	Cavendish House More images	Q26283174
Chinnerys and Premises Occupied by Chris Bolden and Company	II	High Street			10 February 1955	TL8052246494; 52°05′14″N 0°38′00″E		1376679	Chinnerys and Premises Occupied by Chris Bolden and Company More images	Q26657210
Church Cottages	II*	High Street	cottage		10 February 1955	TL8050646504; 52°05′15″N 0°38′00″E		1286156	Church Cottages More images	Q17545662
Corner Cottage	II	High Street			10 February 1955	TL8057246502; 52°05′15″N 0°38′03″E		1376680	Corner Cottage More images	Q26657211
Cosy Nook	II	High Street			10 February 1955	TL8055946498; 52°05′15″N 0°38′02″E		1031784	Cosy Nook More images	Q26283172
Cottage Immediately North of the Nook and the Old Post Office	II	High Street			20 May 1974	TL8080746539; 52°05′16″N 0°38′15″E		1031754	Upload Photo	Q26283141
Denmore	II	High Street			20 May 1974	TL8074046483; 52°05′14″N 0°38′12″E		1031757	Upload Photo	Q26283144
George Hotel	II	High Street	hotel		10 February 1955	TL8054246498; 52°05′15″N 0°38′01″E		1286164	George Hotel More images	Q26574791
House Adjoining Roslyn House on the East	II	High Street			20 May 1974	TL8076046495; 52°05′14″N 0°38′13″E		1031756	Upload Photo	Q26283143
Mill Occupied by A Kahn	II	High Street			20 May 1974	TL8056446535; 52°05′16″N 0°38′03″E		1193460	Upload Photo	Q26488120
Premises Occupied by Wj Cutting	II	High Street			19 December 1961	TL8061846511; 52°05′15″N 0°38′05″E		1031751	Premises Occupied by Wj Cutting More images	Q26283138
Roslyn House	II	High Street			20 May 1974	TL8075346493; 52°05′14″N 0°38′13″E		1285952	Upload Photo	Q26574601
The Nook and House Adjoining	II	High Street			19 December 1961	TL8079646518; 52°05′15″N 0°38′15″E		1031753	Upload Photo	Q26283140
The Old Post Office. Old Post Office Cottage	II	High Street			19 December 1961	TL8082246521; 52°05′15″N 0°38′16″E		1376663	Upload Photo	Q26657195
The Old Rectory the Sue Ryder Home	II	High Street			19 December 1961	TL8066646436; 52°05′12″N 0°38′08″E		1376665	Upload Photo	Q26657197
The Rectory (the Yews)	II	High Street			19 December 1961	TL8060346517; 52°05′15″N 0°38′05″E		1031786	The Rectory (the Yews) More images	Q26283175
Western House	II	High Street			20 May 1974	TL8084246498; 52°05′14″N 0°38′17″E		1376664	Upload Photo	Q26657196
Mizpah and Rawhide	II	Lower Street			20 May 1974	TL8100546478; 52°05′13″N 0°38′26″E		1376666	Upload Photo	Q26657198
Railway Arms Public House	II	Lower Street	pub		20 May 1974	TL8103846472; 52°05′13″N 0°38′27″E		1193925	Railway Arms Public House More images	Q26488564
Sunnyside	II	Lower Street			20 May 1974	TL8104146498; 52°05′14″N 0°38′28″E		1031758	Sunnyside More images	Q26283145
The Cottage	II	Lower Street			20 May 1974	TL8096446488; 52°05′14″N 0°38′24″E		1285965	Upload Photo	Q26683460
Wedcot and House Adjoining	II	Lower Street			20 May 1974	TL8099646507; 52°05′14″N 0°38′25″E		1193860	Upload Photo	Q26488503
Blacklands Lodge	II	Melford Road			20 May 1974	TL8122546516; 52°05′14″N 0°38′37″E		1031759	Upload Photo	Q26283146
Spring View, Middle Cottage and Waver View	II	Middle Cottage And Waver View, High Street			19 December 1961	TL8064046507; 52°05′15″N 0°38′07″E		1376701	Upload Photo	Q26657230
Church Farmhouse	II	Peacocks Road			10 February 1955	TL8048746593; 52°05′18″N 0°37′59″E		1285948	Upload Photo	Q26574598
Nether Hall Farmhouse	II	Peacocks Road			19 December 1961	TL8044346692; 52°05′21″N 0°37′57″E		1376667	Nether Hall Farmhouse More images	Q26657199
Peacocks Farmhouse	II	Peacocks Road			20 May 1974	TL8035046938; 52°05′29″N 0°37′52″E		1031760	Upload Photo	Q26283147
Peacocks Ley	II	Peacocks Road			20 May 1974	TL8040346805; 52°05′25″N 0°37′55″E		1194030	Upload Photo	Q26488666
The Cottage	II	Poole Street			20 May 1974	TL8044046237; 52°05′06″N 0°37′56″E		1031761	Upload Photo	Q26283149
Cavendish Hall	II	Stour Street	building		19 December 1961	TL7940645932; 52°04′58″N 0°37′01″E		1031763	Cavendish Hall More images	Q26283151
Fir Trees Cottage and Headlands	II	Stour Street			20 May 1974	TL7972245824; 52°04′54″N 0°37′17″E		1031762	Upload Photo	Q26283150
Kings Farmhouse	II	Stour Street			20 May 1974	TL7971545858; 52°04′55″N 0°37′17″E		1376669	Upload Photo	Q26657201
Layfield	II	Stour Street			19 December 1961	TL8003245882; 52°04′55″N 0°37′34″E		1285885	Upload Photo	Q26574542
Lodge to Cavendish Hall	II	Stour Street			19 December 1961	TL7965445862; 52°04′55″N 0°37′14″E		1194107	Upload Photo	Q26488737
Moon House	II	Stour Street			20 May 1974	TL7975445825; 52°04′54″N 0°37′19″E		1194104	Upload Photo	Q26488734
Mumfords	II	Stour Street			19 December 1961	TL7998245849; 52°04′54″N 0°37′31″E		1285858	Upload Photo	Q26574518
The Red House	II	Stour Street			19 December 1961	TL8004945865; 52°04′55″N 0°37′34″E		1376668	Upload Photo	Q26657200
Green End	II	The Green			19 December 1961	TL8047246336; 52°05′09″N 0°37′57″E		1031782	Green End More images	Q26283170
Jasmine House	II	The Green			19 December 1961	TL8046646351; 52°05′10″N 0°37′57″E		1193435	Jasmine House More images	Q26488096
K6 Telephone Kiosk	II	The Green			17 September 1992	TL8056146469; 52°05′14″N 0°38′02″E		1236413	K6 Telephone Kiosk More images	Q26529644
Lovelands	II	The Green			19 December 1961	TL8050046382; 52°05′11″N 0°37′59″E		1286180	Lovelands More images	Q26574804
Manor Cottages	II	The Green			20 May 1974	TL8053446408; 52°05′12″N 0°38′01″E		1376677	Manor Cottages More images	Q26657208
Premises Occupied by T Hale and Son (butchers)	II	The Green			19 December 1961	TL8049446359; 52°05′10″N 0°37′59″E		1376678	Premises Occupied by T Hale and Son (butchers) More images	Q26657209
The Grape Vine Restaurant	II	The Green			19 December 1961	TL8051346397; 52°05′11″N 0°38′00″E		1031781	The Grape Vine Restaurant More images	Q26283169
The Greys	II	The Green			19 December 1961	TL8045646363; 52°05′10″N 0°37′57″E		1031783	The Greys More images	Q26283171
The Old Forge	II	The Green			19 December 1961	TL8051146404; 52°05′12″N 0°38′00″E		1193338	The Old Forge More images	Q26487989
The Old Grammar School	II	The Green			19 December 1961	TL8055446436; 52°05′13″N 0°38′02″E		1031780	The Old Grammar School More images	Q26283167
War Memorial	II	The Green	war memorial		31 May 2001	TL8051346464; 52°05′14″N 0°38′00″E		1246133	War Memorial More images	Q26538572
Waver House	II	The Green			20 May 1974	TL8059346474; 52°05′14″N 0°38′04″E		1193285	Upload Photo	Q26487940
Western House and the Little Stores	II	The Green			19 December 1961	TL8053346430; 52°05′12″N 0°38′01″E		1286216	Western House and the Little Stores More images	Q26574837

== See also ==
- Grade I listed buildings in Suffolk
- Grade II* listed buildings in Suffolk

== Sources ==
- Bettely, James; Pevsner, Nikolaus (2015) [1961], Suffolk: West, The Buildings of England, New Haven and London: Yale University Press, ISBN 978-0-300-19655-9
