= St Peter and St Paul's Church, Clare =

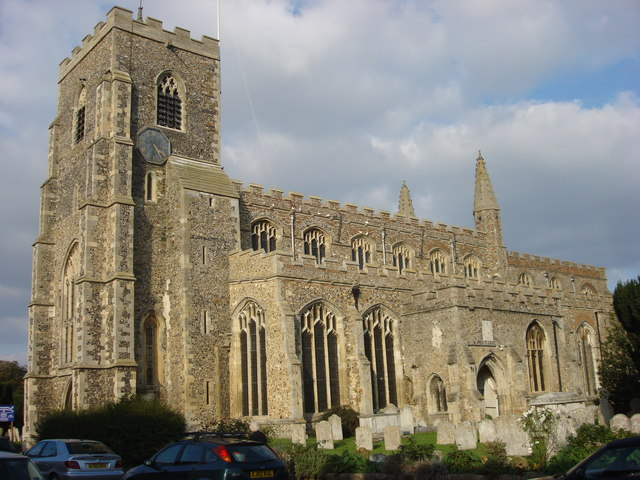
- St Peter and St Paul's Church, Clare
- St Peter and St Paul's Church, Clare
- 52°4′43.88″N 0°34′51.44″E
- OS grid reference: TL 76964 45461
- Location: Clare, Suffolk
- Country: England
- Denomination: Church of England
- Churchmanship: Broad Church
- Website: https://stpeterandstpaulclare.uk/

History
- Dedication: St Peter and St Paul

Architecture
- Heritage designation: Grade I listed

Administration
- Diocese: Diocese of St Edmundsbury and Ipswich
- Archdeaconry: Suffolk
- Deanery: Sudbury
- Parish: Clare

Clergy
- Rector: The Revd Mark Woodrow

St Peter and St Paul's Church, Clare is a Grade I listed parish church in the Church of England in Clare, Suffolk. It is one of the largest in East Anglia, and is included by Simon Jenkins in his 2009 book England's Thousand Best Churches, where he awards it three stars.

== History ==
The list of past priests extends as far back as 1307. The west tower is designed in the perpendicular style of the 13th century, however the church is principally of the 14th and early 15th century.

The church has undergone several renovations including to the nave in the 1440s, the chancel in 1617, and the tower at the end of the 19th century.

The clerestory are slender and closely set, the effect has the same erectness as Holy Trinity Church, Long Melford and St Peter and St Paul's Church, Lavenham.

The church possesses a late 15th-century brass lectern in the form of an eagle with three dogs as feet rather than lions; this may have served as a collection-box, money posted at the beak exiting at the tail. There are two fine private pews, one with the emblems of Henry VIII and Catherine of Aragon, the other an ostentatious Stuart gallery pew with scroll-sided poppyheads "so like those at Little Thurlow that they may have been carved by the same man". In the chancel there are rare Jacobean carved choir stalls. The motto above the sundial over the south porch reads: 'Go about your business', not a mercantile admonition but a peremptory version of St Paul's advice: "For we hear that there are some which walk among you disorderly, working not at all, but are busybodies". Around the doorway may be seen carved ten faces of the Green Man, a somewhat pagan image to be seen on a church, but widely used across Christian Europe.

The greatest disaster to befall the church was the visit of William Dowsing in 1643. The Puritan Parliament decreed the demolition of altars, removal of candlesticks, and defacement of pictures and images. 'Basher' Dowsing, a fanatical anti-Romanist, was appointed as 'Parliamentary Visitor for the East Anglian counties for demolishing the superstitious pictures and ornaments of churches'. 'Cromwell's iconoclast' kept a journal of his visits. On 6 January 1644, he visited six churches, including Haverhill. As for Clare, he wrote: "We brake down 1000 pictures superstitious: I brake down 200; 3 of God the Father, and 3 of Christ, and of the Holy Lamb, and 3 of the Holy Ghost like a Dove with Wings; and the Twelve Apostles were carved in wood, on top of the Roof, which we gave order to take down; and 20 Cherubim to be taken down; and the Sun and the Moon in the East window, by the King's Arms to be taken down". Bullet holes in the roof suggest one inaccurate method, while the rest was done with arrows, stones, poles, and whitewash. The Sun and Moon still survive.

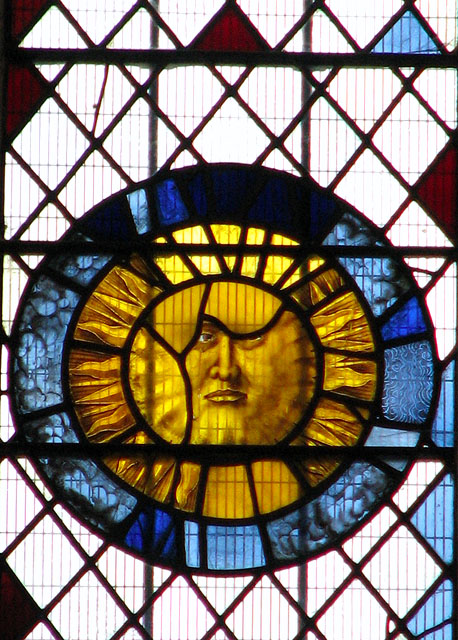
The sun - a fragment of medieval stained glass saved from William Dowsing

Like most English churches, it was altered in the Victorian era. It was first repaired in 1834–36, and a gallery was also added. In 1876 a plan was given by the architect James Piers St Aubyn for work done between 1877 and 1883. In 1898, Detmar Blow, architect for the Society for the Protection of Ancient Buildings, was brought in to repair the tower.

=== Administration ===
The Parish of Clare with Poslingford also includes St Mary's Church, Poslingford, now a chapel of ease. It is part of the Stour Valley Benefice, along with the parishes of:

- St Mary the Virgin's Church, Cavendish
- St John the Baptist's Church, Stoke-by-Clare
- St Leonard's Church, Wixoe
- All Saints Church, Hundon

== Features ==
=== Organ ===
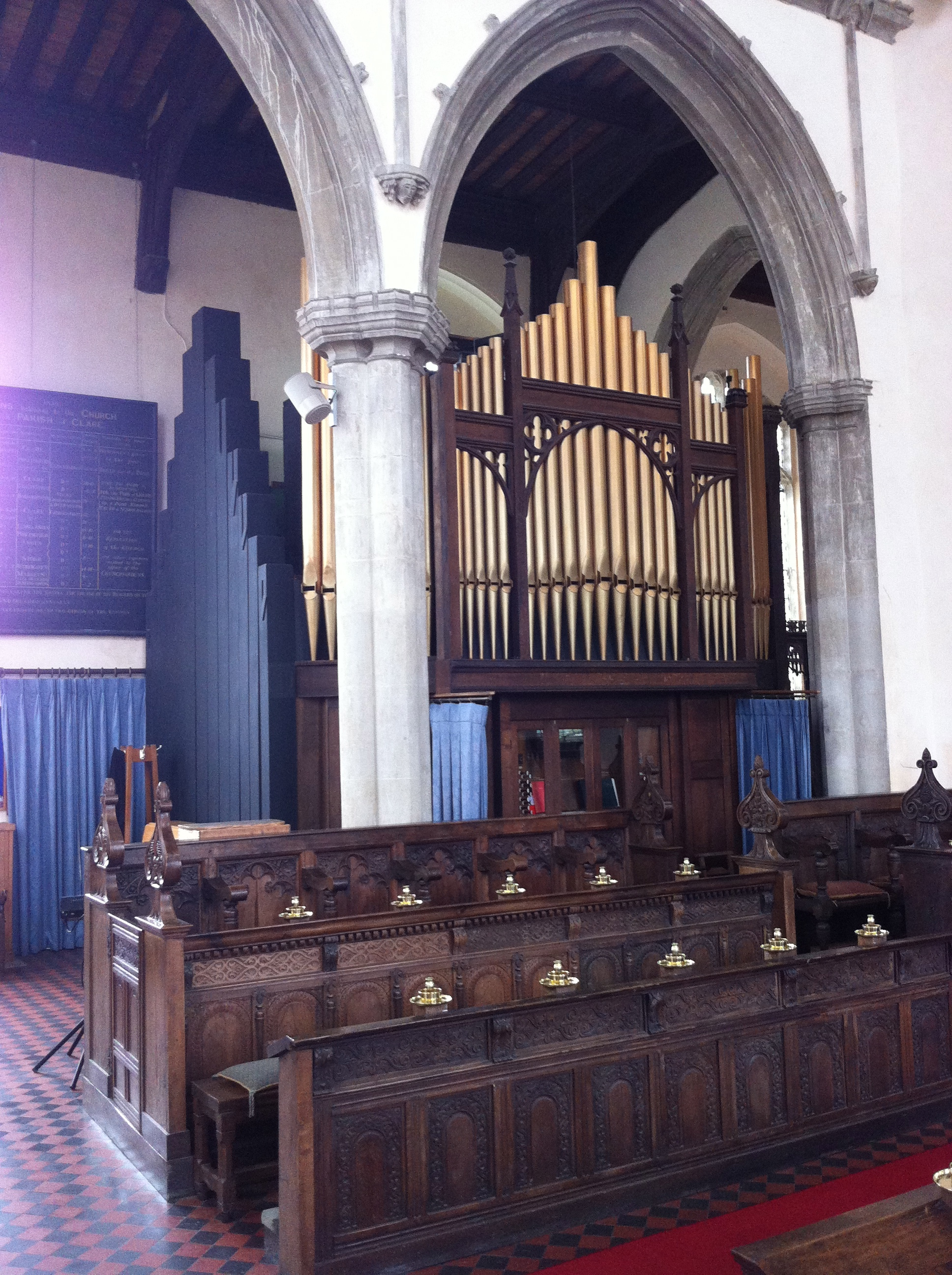
The organ

In the eighteenth century an organ stood at the west end of the church, but this was moved to the current position in 1864. A new organ was obtained in 1888, originally built in 1847 by Gray and Davison for St John the Evangelist's Church, Regent's Park, London.

In 1977 a replacement was acquired from St Peter's Church, Ipswich as a memorial to Clare Wayman (1892-1976). A specification of the organ can be found on the National Pipe Organ Register.

=== Bells ===
The church has a ring of eight bells, noted as having heaviest tenor of any ring of eight bells in Suffolk weighing 28cwt.

The 7th bell is unusually inscribed Trintas Sancta Campanum Istam Conserva ("Holy Trinity conserve this bell") and was likely cast around 1410. The sixth bell dates from 1579, and is by John Dier. At 15cwt and 43 inches in diameter it is largest example of Dier's work to survive.

In 1781 the ring was increased by from six to eight when William Mears cast two additional bells. The third and fifth are by the Miles Graye family of Colchester. The tenor of 28 cwt was recast in 1893 by Charles Newman of Norwich, and the fourth was recast in London by William Mears.

=== The gotch ===
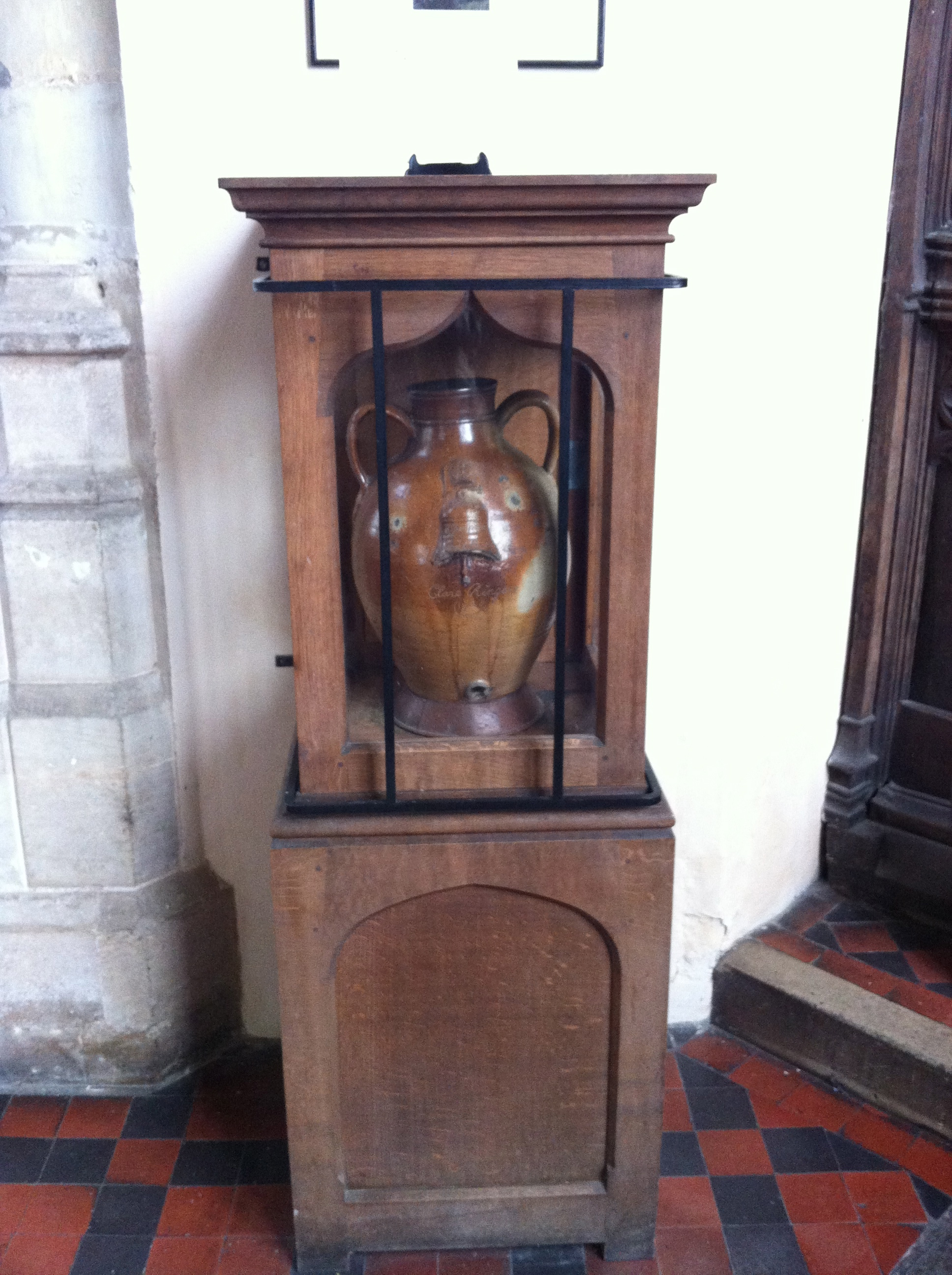
The gotch

An unusual item in the church is the gotch, a beer jug presented to the bell ringers in 1729 by the vicar, Matthew Bell. It is nearly 20 inches (51 cm) high and has a capacity of 32 imperial pints (18 L). It has a pun in its inscription campana sonant canore ("the bells ring in harmony"). The bell and crown, embossed upon it, are a reference to the Crown Hotel which was owned by the family of the vicar.

== The church today ==
The church is open for visitors every day. The Friends of Clare Church holds regular fundraising and social events to support the church. The Society for Music in Clare Church organizes concerts throughout the year. There is an active branch of the Mothers' Union and a Flower Guild.

The choir sings at every principal Sunday service. The church has a well-stocked shop and bookstall. Parking is available around the church in Clare and the nearest car park is at Clare Country Park, about five minutes away up a moderate incline.

== Incumbents ==
Dates from left to right.

| John De Stebbing 1307 | Richard de Scordich 1329 | Gilbert de Karliolo 1343 |
|---|---|---|
| John de Houghton 1344 | John Joye 1348 | Nicholas de Lydgate 1350 |
| Thomas Porter 1361 | Richard Clerk 1388 | William Hall 1390 |
| Walter Cove 1394 | William Reed 1398 | Thomas Custen 1404 |
| Richard Pumpy alias Tylney 1432 | Thomas asty 1462 | John Knight 1467 |
| William Wellys MA 1468 | John Wyllys 1476 | Reginald Annyson 1477 |
| Reginald Annyson 1477 | Thomas Sutton DR 1482 | John Halyman 1502 |
| Richard Turner MA 1505 | John Reiston 1516 | Robert Parker 1562 |
| Thomas Rogers 1565 | Nicholas Whitfilde 1566 | Radulph Leyver BA 1569 |
| Robert Ballard BA 1582 | James Resould 1591 | William Colt MA 1598 |
| Daniel Booth MA 1617 | Isaac Joyner MA 1617 | Robert Wilmot MA 1623 |
| William Good MA 1627 | Roger Cook MA 1645 | John Ockley MA 1663 |
| John Kenyon 1690 | Oliver Cobb MA 1703 | Matthew Bell BA 1727 |
| John Bell BA 1750 | William Lens 1784 | Abraham Wallett 1785 |
| William Brook Jones BA 1791 | William Sadler MA 1804 | Henry Blunt BA 1819 |
| George Wightman DD 1833 | John C. Coleman 1854 | Thomas Parkinson 1869 |
| Frederick S.P. Seale BA 1871 | Joseph W. Collins 1876 | Robert Sorsbie MA 1882 |
| James R.M. Vatcher MA 1896 | Francis S. Swithinbank BA. 1931 | Richard L Hordern MA 1962 |
| John D. Beloe MA 1969 | Ralph Thicknesse MA 1974 | Maurice G. Woodward MA 1977 |
| David J. Wardrop ALCD 1986 | W. John A Rankin MA 1993 | Stuart Mitchell 2011 |
| Mark Woodrow CTh (Oxon), 2021 | | |
