= ICSH =

ICSH may stand for:

- Irish Council for Social Housing
- Interstitial cell stimulating hormone, or luteinizing hormone
