= Greater Poland (disambiguation) =

Greater Poland or Great Poland (Polish: Wielkopolska) is a historic region of west-central Poland.

Greater Poland may also refer to:

- The Duchy of Greater Poland (1138–1320)
- Greater Poland Province, Crown of the Kingdom of Poland (1569–1795)
- Greater Poland Voivodeship or Wielkopolska Province, reformed in 1999
  - Greater Poland Regional Assembly
  - Greater Poland (European Parliament constituency), formed after the 2004 enlargement of the European Union
- Greater Poland National Park, a national park in the Greater Poland Voivodeship, Poland
- Greater Poland Park, an urban park in Warsaw, Poland

== See also ==
- Greater Poland Uprising (disambiguation)
- Polish irredentism
