= Resistance in partitioned Poland (1795–1918) =

Resistance in partitioned Poland

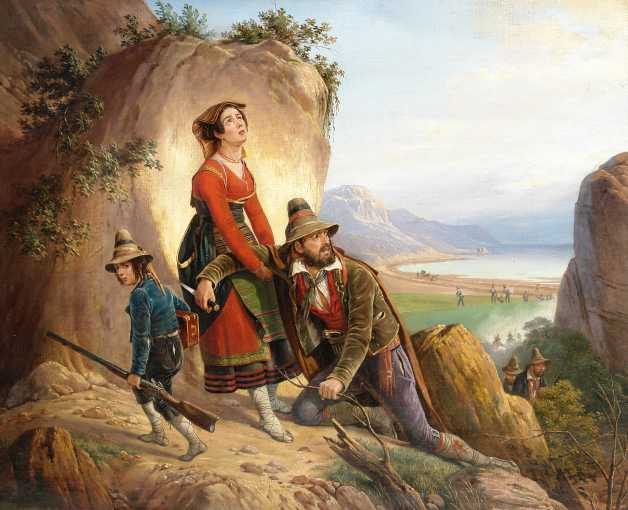
Partisans fleeing by January Suchodolski, oil on canvas.

There were many resistance movements in partitioned Poland between 1795 and 1918. Although some of the szlachta were reconciled to the end of the Polish–Lithuanian Commonwealth in 1795, the possibility of Polish independence was kept alive by events within and without Poland throughout the 19th century. Poland's location on the North European Plain became especially significant in a period when its neighbours, the Kingdom of Prussia and Russia were intensely involved in European rivalries and alliances and modern nation states took form over the entire continent.

== The Napoleonic period ==
At the turn of the 19th century, Europe had begun to feel the impact of momentous political and intellectual movements that, among their other effects, would keep the "Polish Question" on the agenda of international issues needing resolution. Most immediately, Napoleon Bonaparte's attempts to build and expand his empire kept Europe at war for the next decade and brought him into conflict with the same east European powers that had beleaguered Poland in the last decades of the previous century. An alliance of convenience was the natural result of this situation. Volunteer Polish legions attached themselves to Bonaparte's armies, hoping that in return the emperor would allow an independent Poland to reappear out of his conquests.

Although Napoleon promised more than he ever intended to deliver to the Polish cause, in 1807 (after the Wielkopolska Uprising (1806)) he created a Duchy of Warsaw from Prussian territory that had been part of old Poland and was still inhabited by Poles. The Duchy disappeared after Napoleon's defeat and the Congress of Vienna.

Although brief, the Napoleonic period occupies an important place in Polish history. Much of the legend and symbolism of modern Polish patriotism derives from this period, including the conviction that Polish independence is a necessary element of a just and legitimate European order. This conviction was simply expressed in a fighting slogan of the time, "for your freedom and ours." Moreover, the appearance of the Duchy of Warsaw so soon after the partitions proved that the seemingly final historical death sentence delivered in 1795 was not necessarily the end of the Polish nation-state. Instead, many observers came to believe that favourable circumstances would free Poland from foreign domination.

== The impact of nationalism and romanticism ==
The intellectual and artistic climate of the early 19th century further stimulated the growth of Polish demands for self-government. During these decades, modern nationalism took shape and rapidly developed a massive following throughout the continent, becoming the most dynamic and appealing political doctrine of its time. By stressing the value and dignity of native cultures and languages, nationalism offered a rationale for ethnic loyalty and Romanticism was the artistic element of 19th-century European culture that exerted the strongest influence on the Polish national consciousness. The Romantic movement was a natural partner of political nationalism, for it echoed the nationalist sympathy for folk cultures and manifested a general air of disdain for the conservative political order of post-Napoleonic Europe. Under this influence, Polish literature flourished anew in the works of a school of 19th-century Romantic poets, led by Adam Mickiewicz. Mickiewicz concentrated on patriotic themes and the glorious national past. Repressed by the partitioning authorities, cultural movements (such as the Philomaths) would lay the groundwork for nationalistic and patriotic uprisings that would soon come.

Nurtured by these influences, nationalism awoke first among the intelligentsia and certain segments of the nobility, then more gradually in the peasantry. At the end of the process, a broader definition of nationhood had replaced the old class-based "noble patriotism" of Poland. In particular, peasants, who cared little for the oppressive, serfdom dominated Commonwealth, would increasingly become involved in the Polish cause.

== The era of national insurrections ==
For several decades, the Polish national movement gave priority to the immediate restoration of independence, a drive that found expression in a series of armed rebellions. The insurgencies arose mainly in the Russian zone of partition to the east, about three-quarters of which was formerly Polish territory. After the Congress of Vienna, Russia had organized its Polish lands as the Congress Kingdom of Poland, granting it a quite liberal constitution, its own army, and limited autonomy within the tsarist empire. In the 1820s, however, Russian rule grew more arbitrary, and secret societies were formed by intellectuals in several cities to plot an insurrection. In November 1830, Polish troops in Warsaw rose in revolt. When the government of Congress Poland proclaimed solidarity with the rebel forces shortly thereafter, a new Polish-Russian war began. The rebels' requests for aid from France were ignored, and their reluctance to abolish serfdom cost them the support of the peasantry. By September 1831, the Russians had subdued Polish resistance and forced 6,000 resistance fighters into exile in France, beginning a time of harsh repression of intellectual and religious activity throughout Poland. At the same time, Congress Poland lost its constitution and its army.

After the failure of the November Revolt, clandestine conspiratorial activity continued on Polish territory. An exiled Polish political and intellectual elite established a base of operations in Paris. A conservative group headed by Adam Jerzy Czartoryski (one of the leaders of the November Revolt) relied on foreign diplomatic support to restore Poland's status as established by the Congress of Vienna, which Russia had routinely violated beginning in 1819. Otherwise, this group was satisfied with a return to monarchy and traditional social structures.

The radical factions never formed a united front on any issue besides the general goal of independence. Their programs insisted that the Poles liberate themselves by their own efforts and linked independence with republicanism and the emancipation of the serfs. Handicapped by internal division, limited resources, heavy surveillance, and persecution of revolutionary cells in Poland, the Polish national movement suffered numerous losses. The movement sustained a major setback in the 1846 revolt organized in Austrian Poland by the Polish Democratic Society, the leading radical nationalist group. The uprising ended in a bloody fiasco when the peasantry took up arms against the rebel leadership dominated by nobility and gentry, which was regarded as potentially a worse oppressor than the Austrians. By incurring harsh military repression from Austria, the failed revolt left the Polish nationalists in a poor position to participate in the wave of national revolution that crossed Europe in 1848 and 1849 (although an insurrection occurred in German occupied Greater Poland). The stubborn idealism of this uprising's leaders emphasized individual liberty and separate national identity rather than establishment of a unified republic—a significant change of political philosophy from earlier movements.

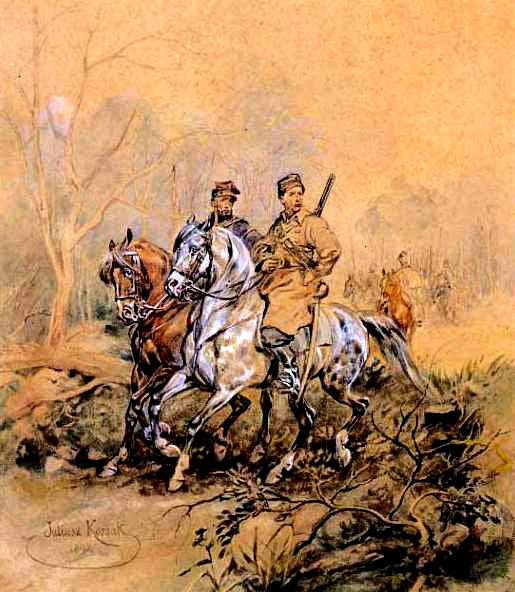
Polish partisans of 1863 by Juliusz Kossak, oil on canvas.

The last and most tenacious of the Polish uprisings of the mid-19th century erupted in the Russian-occupied sector in January 1863 (see January Uprising). Following Russia's disastrous defeat in the Crimean War, the government of Tsar Alexander II enacted a series of liberal reforms, including liberation of the serfs throughout the empire. High-handed imposition of land reforms in Poland aroused hostility among the landed nobles and a group of young radical intellectuals influenced by Karl Marx and the Russian liberal Alexander Herzen. Repeating the pattern of 1830-31, the open revolt of the January Insurrection by Congress Poland failed to win foreign backing. Although its socially progressive program could not mobilize the peasants, the rebellion persisted stubbornly for fifteen months. After finally crushing the insurgency in August 1864, Russia abolished the Congress Poland altogether and revoked the separate status of the Polish lands, incorporating them directly as the Western Region of the Russian Empire. The region was placed under the dictatorial rule of Mikhail Nikolayevich Muravyov-Vilensky, who became known as the Hangman of Vilna. All Polish citizens were assimilated into the empire. When Russia officially emancipated the Polish serfs in early 1864, it removed a major rallying point from the agenda of potential Polish revolutionaries.

== The time of "Organic Work" ==
Increasing oppression at Russian hands after failed national uprisings finally convinced Polish leaders that the recent insurrection was premature at best and perhaps fundamentally misguided and counterproductive. During the decades that followed the January Insurrection, Poles largely forsook the goal of immediate independence and turned instead to fortifying the nation through the subtler means of education, economic development, and modernization. This approach took the name Organic Work for its philosophy of strengthening Polish society at the grass roots, influenced by positivism. For some, the adoption of Organic Work meant permanent resignation to foreign rule, but many advocates recommended it as a strategy to combat repression while awaiting an eventual opportunity to achieve self-government.

Though Organic Work was not as prominently etched in national memory compared to the rebellions, the everyday methods of Organic Work proved successful in countering the Germanization and Russification policies enforced by the occupiers.

== Revolution in the Kingdom of Poland ==
Revolution in the Kingdom of Poland in the years (1905–1907) was a major part of the Russian Revolution of 1905 in Russian-partitioned Poland . One of the major events of that period was the insurrection in Łódź in June 1905. Throughout that period, many smaller manifestations, demonstrations and armed struggles between the peasants and workers on one side, and the government on the other, would take place. The demands of the demonstrators would include both the improvement of the workers living conditions, and political freedoms, particularly related to increased autonomy for Poland. Particularly in 1905, Poland was at the verge of the new uprising, revolution or a civil war. While never reaching the national scale of the November or January Uprisings, some Polish historians indeed consider the events of that period a notable uprising against the Russian Empire.

== World War I ==
After World War I and the collapse of the Russian, German and Austro-Hungarian Empires, Poland became an independent republic. However, Poland's geographical position between Germany and Russia had meant much fighting and terrific human and material losses for the Poles between 1914 and 1918.

The war split the ranks of the three partitioning empires, pitting Russia as defender of Serbia and ally of Britain and France against the leading members of the Central Powers, Germany and Austria-Hungary. This circumstance afforded the Poles political leverage as both sides offered pledges of concessions and future autonomy in exchange for Polish loyalty and army recruits, as partitioners encouraged the raise of Polish resistance movements targeting the "other side". The Austrians wanted to incorporate Congress Poland into their territory of Galicia, so even before the war they allowed nationalist organizations to form there (for example, Związek Strzelecki), which would eventually be the basis of the Polish Legions in World War I. The Russians recognized the Polish right to autonomy and allowed formation of the Polish National Committee, which supported the Russian side; it would eventually lead to the rise of the Blue Army in France.

In the meantime, Piłsudski had correctly predicted that the war would ruin all three of the partitioners, a conclusion most people thought highly unlikely before 1918. Piłsudski, in addition to his Legions, would also form the Polish Military Organization, a secret counterpart to the officially pro-Austrian Legions. PMO, clearly tasked with regaining Polish independence, would increasingly work against all three partitioners.

Piłsudski became a popular hero when Berlin jailed him for insubordination. The Allies broke the resistance of the Central Powers by autumn 1918, as the Habsburg monarchy disintegrated and the German imperial government collapsed. The Greater Poland Uprising, one of the few Polish uprisings to actually succeed, that begun around that time, marks - with its success - the end of the Polish resistance to the partitioners. In October 1918, Polish authorities took over Galicia and Cieszyn Silesia. In November 1918, Piłsudski was released from internment in Germany by the revolutionaries and returned to Warsaw. Upon his arrival, on November 11, 1918 the Regency Council of the Regency Kingdom of Poland (intended to be a German puppet state) ceded all responsibilities to him and Piłsudski took control over the newly created state as its provisional Chief of State. Soon all the local governments that had been created in the last months of the war pledged allegiance to the central government in Warsaw. Independent Poland, which had been absent from the map of Europe for 123 years, was reborn.

The newly created state initially consisted of former Congress Poland, western Galicia (with Lwów besieged by the Ukrainians) and part of Cieszyn Silesia.

== See also ==
- History of Poland (1918–1939)
- Greater Poland Uprising
