= Cavendish (surname) =

English surname

Cavendish (/ˈkævəndɪʃ/ KAV-ən-dish) is an English toponymic surname, deriving from a placename in Suffolk.

Etymologically, the placename is believed to derive from Old English Cafa/Cafna, a personal byname from caf 'bold, daring', plus edisc 'enclosure; enclosed pasture'.

Spelling has varied considerably over time; Cavendish, Suffolk was first recorded in 1086 in the Domesday Book, as Kavandisc,. The derived surname appears as Kanauadisc in 1086, de Cavendis in 1201, Cavenedis circa 1190 and in 1242, and de Cavendish in 1302. Shortened forms of the name (via Middle English spellings like Cauendish and Caundish) have included Candish and Cantis/Candis, though the latter has also been independently derived from Candace/Candice, originally a Biblical given name.

Peoplie with the surname include:

- Ada Cavendish (1839–1895), British actress
- Anthony Cavendish (1927–2013), British intelligence officer
- Camilla Cavendish (born 1968), British journalist
- Lord Charles Cavendish (politician, born 1704) (1704–1783), British nobleman, Whig politician and scientist
- Charles Cavendish, 1st Baron Chesham (1793–1863), British Liberal politician
- George Cavendish (writer) (c. 1494 – 1562) English writer and biographer of Cardinal Thomas Wolsey
- Henry Cavendish (1731–1810), British physicist, discoverer of hydrogen
- Lucy Cavendish (1841–1925), British pioneer of women's education
- Margaret Cavendish, Duchess of Newcastle-upon-Tyne (1623–1673), English aristocrat, writer, and philosopher
- Mark Cavendish (born 1985), Manx cyclist
- Michael Cavendish (c. 1565–1628), English composer
- Peregrine Cavendish, 12th Duke of Devonshire (born 1944), British peer and owner of Pratt's Club
- Lord Richard Cavendish (1752–1781), British MP
- Lord Richard Cavendish (1871–1946), British MP, aristocrat, author, magistrate
- Richard Cavendish (occult writer) (1930–2016), British writer on topics dealing with the occult
- Robin Cavendish (1930–1994), British advocate for disabled people
- Sid Cavendish (1876–1954), English footballer with Southampton and Clapton Orient
- Thomas Cavendish (1560–1592), English admiral, and namesake of Cavendish tobacco

== See also ==
- Cavendish family, the family of the dukes of Devonshire and Newcastle
- William Cavendish-Bentinck, 3rd Duke of Portland (1738–1809), Prime Minister of the United Kingdom
