= Nicholas Cavendish, 6th Baron Chesham =

British politician (1941–2009)

The Right Honourable The Lord Chesham

Deputy Chief Whip of the House of Lords Captain of the Yeomen of the Guard
- In office 8 July 1995 – 3 May 1997
- Prime Minister: John Major
- Preceded by: The Lord Inglewood
- Succeeded by: The Lord McIntosh of Haringey

Member of the House of Lords Lord Temporal
- In office 23 December 1989 – 11 November 1999 hereditary peer
- Preceded by: 5th Baron Chesham
- Succeeded by: seat abolished (House of Lords Act 1999)

Personal details
- Born: 7 November 1941
- Died: 27 August 2009 (aged 67)
- Party: Conservative

Nicholas Charles Cavendish, 6th Baron Chesham (7 November 1941 – 27 August 2009), was a British Conservative politician.

A member of the Cavendish family headed by the Duke of Devonshire, Chesham was the son of John Cavendish, 5th Baron Chesham and Mary Edmunds Marshall. He took his seat in the House of Lords on his father's death in 1989, and served as Captain of the Yeomen of the Guard (Deputy Chief Government Whip in the House of Lords) from 1995 to 1997 in the Conservative administration of John Major. However, he lost his seat in the House of Lords after the passing of the House of Lords Act 1999, which removed the automatic right of hereditary peers to sit in the upper chamber of Parliament. He married first on 4 November 1965 to Susan Donne Beauchamp. They divorced in 1969. Nicholas then married Suzanne Adrienne Byrne, in 1973. He died on 27 August 2009.

They had two sons:

- Charles Cavendish, 7th Baron Chesham, b. 11 November 1974 who succeeded his father to become the seventh Baron Chesham.
- The Hon. William George Gray Compton, b. 13 April 1980

Political offices
Preceded by The Lord Inglewood	Captain of the Yeomen of the Guard; 1995–1997	Succeeded by The Lord Macintosh of Haringey
Peerage of the United Kingdom
Preceded by John Cavendish	Baron Chesham; 1989–2009	Succeeded by Charles Cavendish
