= Irish Council for Social Housing =

Irish Council for Social Housing (ICSH)
- Founded: 1982
- Type: National Social Housing Federation
- Purpose: Housing management & provision; Exchange of information; Training & research
- Location: Dublin
- Region served: Ireland
- Key people: Executive Director, Donal McManus

The Irish Council for Social Housing (ICSH) is a national social housing federation representing over 300 housing associations across Ireland. As a representative organisation the ICSH works with statutory and other voluntary organisations to identify and streamline mechanisms to promote social housing in relieving housing need in Ireland through policy development and analysis.

== Background ==
The Irish Council for Social Housing (ICSH) was formed in 1982 by housing and hostel organisations in Ireland to act as a national representative, promotional, information and advisory federation.

== Services ==
Members are involved in the delivery and management of social housing and related services to families on low incomes, homeless people, people with disabilities and the elderly. Over the last decade the sector has grown significantly and the work of housing associations has both intensified and diversified.

As well as being involved in policy issues, the ICSH is committed to assisting members in the provision of social housing and housing related services through the range of services it provides. These services include education and training courses, which are accredited by the National College of Ireland, a group insurance scheme for housing associations, a legal registration service to assist newly formed associations and an advisory service on all aspects of social housing development and management.

== Objectives ==
The main objectives of the ICSH are:

- Promotion of non-profit/Voluntary Housing for the relief of housing need and homelessness.
- Acting as a representative body for affiliated members.
- Facilitating the exchange of information amongst members in relation to planning, provision and management of social housing.
- Provision of information, advice, guidance, education, training and research.

== Members ==
Among the organisation's members are: Society of Saint Vincent de Paul, Irish Wheelchair Association and Sue Ryder Foundation.
