= Cavendish (given name) =

Cavendish is a masculine given name which is borne by:

- Cavendish W. Cannon (1895–1962), American diplomat
- Cavendish Morton (actor) (1874–1939), British actor, photographer, and art director
- Cavendish Morton (artist) (1911–2015), British painter and illustrator
