= Greater Poland Park =

Urban park in Warsaw, Poland

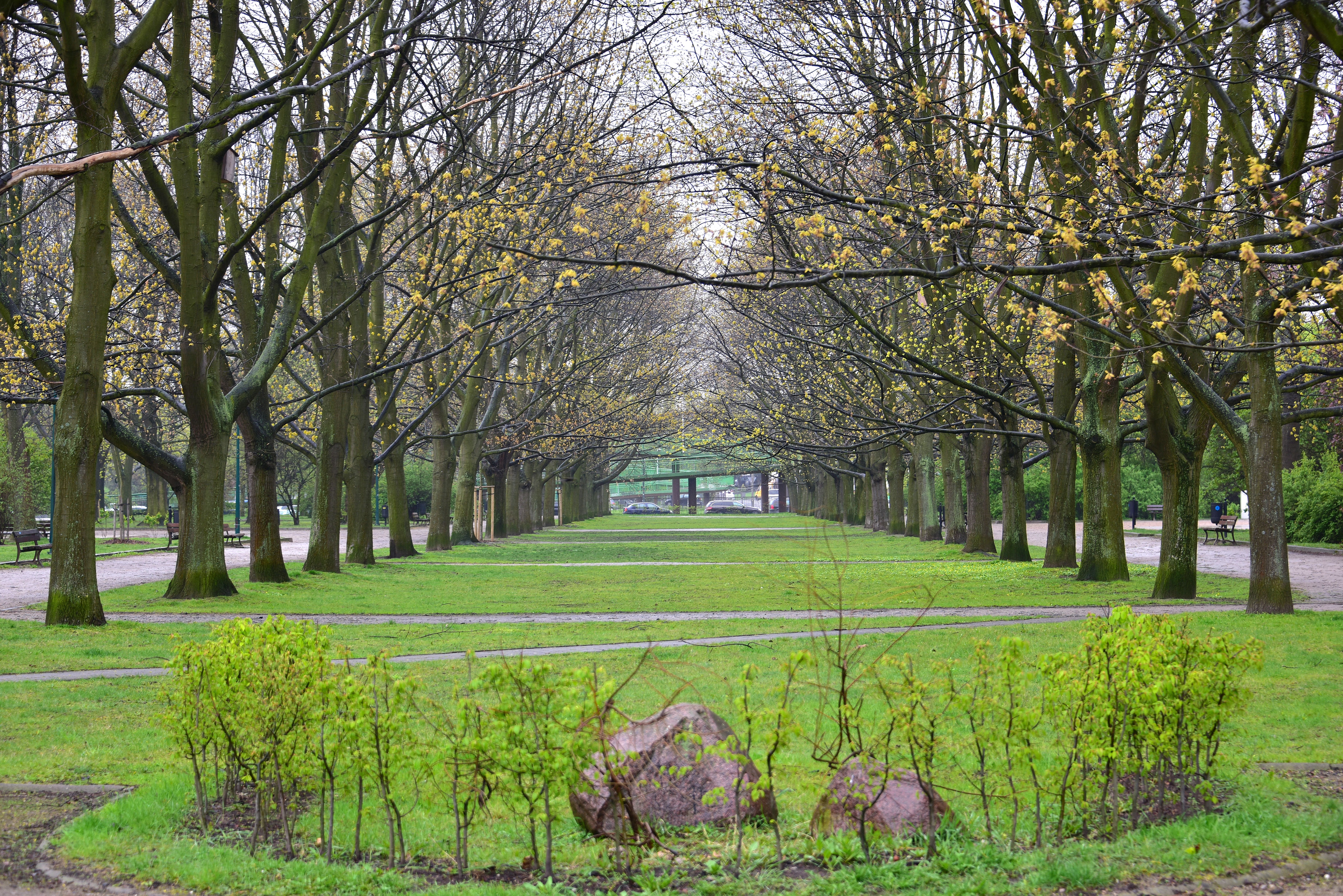
- The main avenue of the Greater Poland Park in 2017.
- Interactive map of Greater Poland Park
- Type: Urban park
- Location: Warsaw, Poland
- Coordinates: 52°13′04″N 20°59′40″E
- Area: 4.73 hectares (11.7 acres)
- Created: 1938

The Greater Poland Park (Polish: Park Wielkopolski), also known as the Greater Poland Square (Polish: Zieleniec Wielkopolski), is an urban park in Warsaw, Poland. It is located in the district of Ochota, between Łęczycka Street, Wawelska Street, Górnickiego Street, Reja Street, Krzyckiego Street, Dantyszka Street, and Filtrowa Street.

== Name ==
The Greater Poland Park (Polish: Park Wielkopolski) also known as the Greater Poland Square (Polish: Zieleniec Wielkopolski) was named after its main pathway, the Greater Poland Avenue (Polish: Aleja Wielkopolski or Aleja Wielkopolska), which itself was named after Greater Poland (Polish: Wielkopolska), a historical and cultural region in western Poland.

== History ==
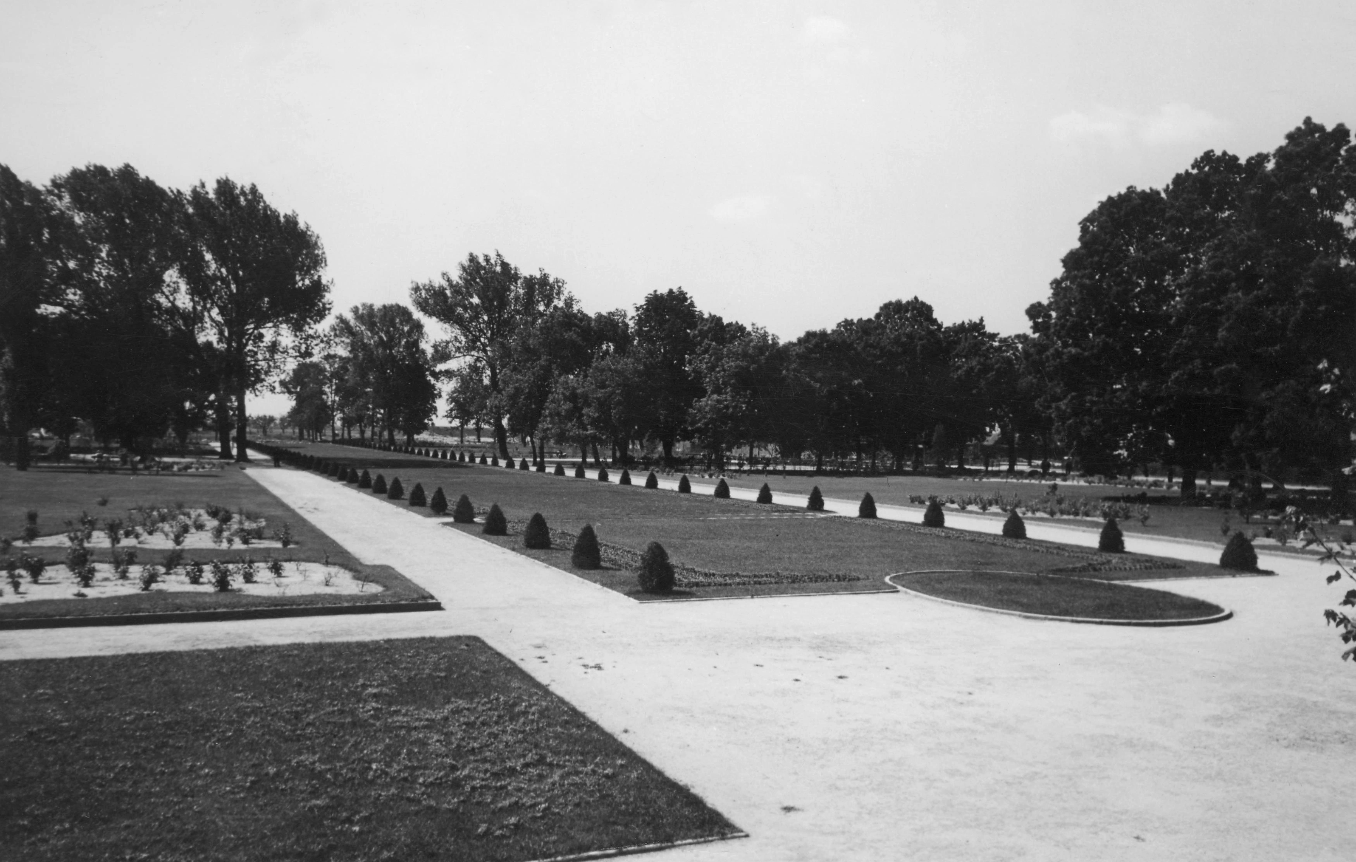
The Greater Poland Park in 1938.

Greater Poland Avenue (Polish: Aleja Wielkopolski, Aleja Wielkopolska), which now forms the main pathway of the Greater Poland Park, was designed by Zygmunt Hellwig, and built between 1932 and 1935. It was originally meant to be one of the main roads of the planned, but never constructed, Józef Piłsudski District, and was intended to be longer than its current form, with a length of 60 m (197 ft). It was planned to end at Wołoska Street, however, only the portion between Wawelska Street, and Filtrowa Street was built.

The Greater Poland Park was built in 1938, and consisted of two parts. First portion in the shape of a square was between Łęczycka Street, Wawelska Street, Górnickiego Street, and Filtrowa Street, and the other portion, in a shape of trapezoid, was placed between Dantyszka, Reja, Krzyckiego, and Górnickiego Street. The park was designed by Leon Danielewicz, and Zygmunt Hellwig in the modernist style. The Greater Poland Avenue became its main pathway.

Originally in the park were planted Simon's poplar trees, which were replaced in the 1970s with northern red oaks.

In 1983, the park received the status of a cultural property.

In 2006, the portion of the park between Reja Street, Krzyckiego Street, Dantyszka Street, and Górnickiego Street, was named Sue Ryder Square, after Sue Ryder, a volunteer in the Special Operations Executive during the Second World War.

== Characteristics ==
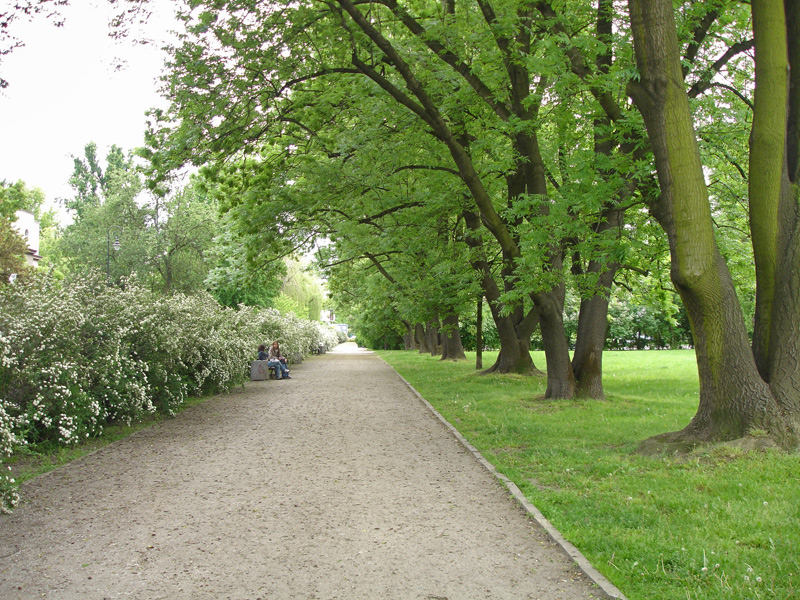
A path in the Sue Ryder Square, which forms part of the Greater Poland Park.

The Greater Poland Park consists of two parts. The first portion in the shape of a square is placed between Łęczycka, Wawelska, Górnickiego, and Filtrowa Streets, and the other portion, in the shape of a trapezoid, is located between Dantyszka, Reja, Krzyckiego, and Górnickiego Streets. The Greater Poland Avenue, located between Wawelska and Filtrowa Streets, forms its main pathway. The park has the total area of 4,73 ha.

The portion of the park between Dantyszka, Reja, Krzyckiego, and Górnickiego Streets, is named the Sue Ryder Square (Polish: Skwer Sue Ryder), after Sue Ryder, a volunteer in the Special Operations Executive during the Second World War.
