= Standish (surname) =

Standish is an English surname. Notable people with the surname include:

- Alice Standish Buell, born as Alice Standish, (1892–1960), American painter and etcher
- Burt L. Standish, pen name of Gilbert Patten
- Charity Standish, fictional character on NBC/DirecTV soap opera Passions
- Charles Strickland Standish (1790–1863), British Whig politician
- Dick Standish (born 1942), American journalist
- E. Myles Standish (born 1939), American mathematical astronomer
- Frank Hall Standish (1799–1840), English collector of art and literature
- Frederick Standish (1824–1883), Australian Chief Commissioner of Police in Victoria
- Henry Standish (c. 1475–1535), English Franciscan
- Hilda Crosby Standish (1902–2005), US physician and birth control advocate
- Isolde Standish, Australian and British Humanities Scholar and film theorist
- James D. Standish, communications director for the South Pacific Division of Seventh-day Adventists
- John Standish, English Anglican priest
- King Standish, fictional character in the DC Comics Universe
- Michael Standish, British production designer
- Michael "Miles" Standish (1964-2023), American businessman, author, rare coin expert, sports memorabilia expert and philanthropist
- Myles Standish (c. 1584–1656), one of the early Pilgrim settlers in America
- Richard Standish (1621–1662), English politician and Civil War colonel
- Robert Standish, pseudonym of the English novelist Digby George Gerahty
- Robert Standish (artist) (born 1964), American artist
- Standish brothers Colin and Russell, historic Seventh-day Adventists
- Susanne Standish-White (born 1956), Zimbabwean rower
- Thomas Standish (c. 1593–1642), English politician
- William Lloyd Standish (1930–2015), United States District Judge
