= Sue Ryder (charity) =

British palliative neurological and bereavement support charity

- Formation: 1953; 73 years ago
- Founder: Sue Ryder
- Type: Nonprofit
- Registration no.: 1052076 (England & Wales), SC039578 (Scotland)
- Legal status: Charity
- Purpose: Palliative and bereavement support
- Headquarters: Kings House, King Street, Sudbury, Suffolk CO10 2ED
- Location: United Kingdom
- Patron: Charles III
- Chief Executive: James Sanderson
- Key people: Dr Rima Makarem; Chair of Trustees
- Revenue: £112.75 million (2022)
- Staff: 2,925 (2022)
- Volunteers: 12,084 (2022)
- Website: www.sueryder.org
- Formerly called: The Sue Ryder Foundation; Sue Ryder Care

Sue Ryder is a British palliative and bereavement support charity based in the United Kingdom. Formed as The Sue Ryder Foundation in 1953 by World War II Special Operations Executive volunteer Sue Ryder, the organisation provides care and support for people living with terminal illnesses and neurological conditions, as well as individuals who are coping with a bereavement. The charity was renamed Sue Ryder Care in 1996, before adopting its current name in 2011.

== Care centres ==
Sue Ryder care for people with complex conditions in their hospices and palliative care hubs, as well as providing care in people’s homes, in the community and online. The charity provides palliative care and support from its specialist centres and in people's homes. It operates a free Online Bereavement Counselling Service., connecting people who are grieving with appropriate information and resources, qualified counsellors or a community support network Online Bereavement Community. It provides information and resources for health and social care professionals, and it campaigns to improve palliative care and bereavement support nationally. Sue Ryder hospices and neurological care centres are currently operated in the following areas:

- Aberdeen, Scotland: Dee View Court (neurological care centre)
- Cheltenham, Gloucestershire: Leckhampton Court Hospice (palliative care centre)
- Leeds, West Yorkshire: Wheatfields Hospice (palliative care centre)
- Moggerhanger, Bedfordshire: St John's Hospice (palliative care centre)
- South Oxfordshire: South Oxfordshire Palliative Care Hub (palliative care centre)
- Oxenhope, West Yorkshire: Manorlands Hospice (palliative care centre)
- Peterborough, Cambridgeshire: Thorpe Hall Hospice (palliative care centre)
- Reading, Berkshire: Duchess of Kent Hospice (palliative care centre)

== Fundraising ==
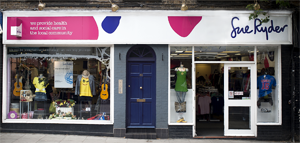
Sue Ryder has over 400 charity shops in the UK, which provide significant income annually.

Sue Ryder's income was £112.75 million during the year ending 31 March 2022, which included £37.5 million from NHS and local authority funding, and £73.7 million from fundraising campaigns and retail sales (both online and in the charity's 400 shops). The income was used for providing 525,000 hours of palliative and end-of-life care to people in the UK. In addition to full-time staff, the charity currently has more than 12,000 volunteers supporting its work across the UK. Volunteering roles cover many areas of the charity's work, including administration, catering, transport, gardening, fundraising, finance, retail, photography, events coordination, cleaning, research, befriending and bereavement support.

Sue Ryder launched its Prisoner Volunteer Programme in 2006. It works with around 40 prisons nationwide offering work experience in 100 locations, including offices, shops and warehouses. The programme has won a number of awards, including the Education and Training award at Civil Society's Charity Awards in 2013. In 2014, the charity opened a shop in Slough which offered staff roles to homeless people in partnership with the organisation Slough Homeless Our Concern.

== Controversy ==
In February 2013, Sue Ryder was criticised alongside other charitable organisations for taking part in the UK Government's workfare scheme, in which people living on benefits were instructed to attend unpaid work at various companies and charities, at the risk of otherwise losing their benefits. After enlisting "around 1,000" volunteers as part of the scheme, Sue Ryder later promised a "phased withdrawal" due to online protests. The charity later released a statement explaining that they had chosen to withdraw in order to "protect staff from an online campaign of harassment".

== See also ==
- Leonard Cheshire Disability
