= Cavendish, Suffolk =

Village and civil parish in Suffolk, England

Coordinates: 52.087°N 0.633°E

Cavendish
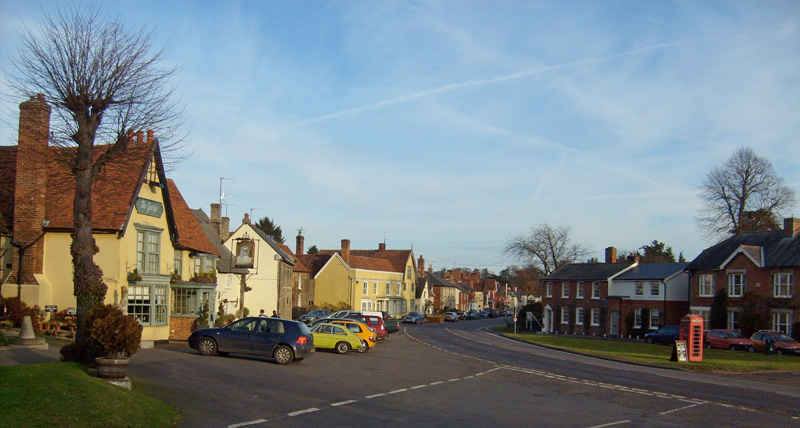
- Cavendish High Street, seen from the green

- Location within Suffolk
- Population: 1,026 (2011)
- OS grid reference: TL805464
- District: West Suffolk
- Shire county: Suffolk
- Region: East
- Country: England
- Sovereign state: United Kingdom
- Post town: SUDBURY
- Postcode district: CO10
- Dialling code: 01787
- Police: Suffolk
- Fire: Suffolk
- Ambulance: East of England
- UK Parliament: South Suffolk

Cavendish is a village and civil parish in the Stour Valley in Suffolk, England.

== Toponymy ==
The name Cavendish is thought to be of Old English origin, derived from a combination of the personal name Cafa or Cafna, meaning 'bold' or 'daring', the genitive suffix -n, and edisc or eddish, meaning 'enclosed pasture'.^{[note a]} The habitational surname Cavendish is derived from this toponym. Keith Briggs and Kelly Kilpatrick cite several alternate spellings of the name in the Domesday Book before the spelling "Cavendish" became standard.

== History ==
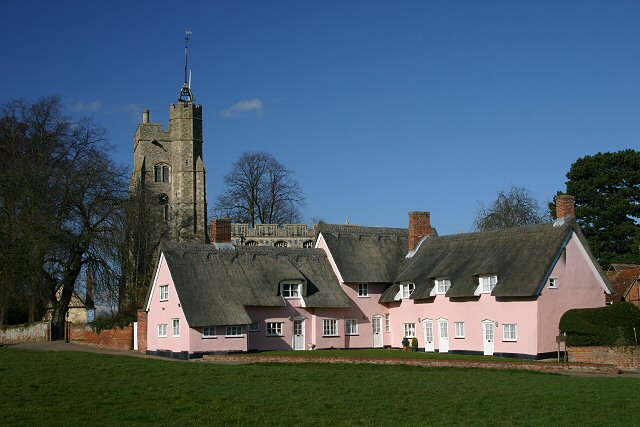
The Pink Cottages and St Mary's Church, from the village green

It was home to Sir John Cavendish, the ancestor of the Dukes of Devonshire, who was involved in suppressing the Peasants' Revolt. Wat Tyler, the peasants' leader, was arrested by William Walworth, the Mayor of London, for threatening King Richard II in 1381. As Tyler fought back, Cavendish's son, also called John, who was responsible for escorting the King, ran Tyler through with his sword, killing him. As a result, John Cavendish tried to flee from the pursuing peasants, and he hung on to the handle of the door of St Mary's Church to plead sanctuary. A few days later, on 15 June 1381, the elder John Cavendish was seized at Bury St Edmunds and beheaded by a mob led by Jack Straw. He is buried in Bury St Edmunds. St Mary's Church had a bequest from Sir John, and its chancel was restored.

The village has a United Reformed Church, where Catholic services are also held, and three pubs – the Five Bells, the George, and the Bull. Leonard Lord Cheshire and his wife Sue Ryder are buried in Cavendish Cemetery and there is a memorial to them within St Mary's Church. The museum at Cavendish is now closed but history of the Sue Ryder Foundation and life at the Cavendish home may be obtained from the Sue Ryder legacy and history team. As Cavendish was begun as a home for concentration camp survivors the charity holds some records of the people who were rescued by Sue Ryder.

== Climate ==
Climate data for Cavendish (1991–2020 normals, extremes 1977-)
Month	Jan	Feb	Mar	Apr	May	Jun	Jul	Aug	Sep	Oct	Nov	Dec	Year
Record high °C (°F)	15.2 (59.4)	18.7 (65.7)	21.2 (70.2)	26.6 (79.9)	32.6 (90.7)	37.1 (98.8)	37.9 (100.2)	37.3 (99.1)	32.2 (90.0)	29.0 (84.2)	17.7 (63.9)	15.4 (59.7)	37.9 (100.2)
Mean daily maximum °C (°F)	7.3 (45.1)	8.0 (46.4)	10.8 (51.4)	14.1 (57.4)	17.4 (63.3)	20.4 (68.7)	23.2 (73.8)	23.2 (73.8)	19.8 (67.6)	15.1 (59.2)	10.5 (50.9)	7.6 (45.7)	14.8 (58.6)
Daily mean °C (°F)	4.4 (39.9)	4.6 (40.3)	6.6 (43.9)	9.0 (48.2)	12.0 (53.6)	14.9 (58.8)	17.4 (63.3)	17.5 (63.5)	14.8 (58.6)	11.2 (52.2)	7.3 (45.1)	4.7 (40.5)	10.4 (50.7)
Mean daily minimum °C (°F)	1.4 (34.5)	1.3 (34.3)	2.5 (36.5)	3.8 (38.8)	6.6 (43.9)	9.4 (48.9)	11.6 (52.9)	11.8 (53.2)	9.8 (49.6)	7.3 (45.1)	4.0 (39.2)	1.8 (35.2)	6.0 (42.8)
Record low °C (°F)	−16.4 (2.5)	−15.5 (4.1)	−7.4 (18.7)	−6.9 (19.6)	−4.2 (24.4)	−0.5 (31.1)	2.6 (36.7)	2.6 (36.7)	0.0 (32.0)	−5.8 (21.6)	−8.2 (17.2)	−16.1 (3.0)	−16.4 (2.5)
Average precipitation mm (inches)	49.1 (1.93)	41.3 (1.63)	37.4 (1.47)	37.0 (1.46)	44.1 (1.74)	50.2 (1.98)	49.2 (1.94)	62.0 (2.44)	50.2 (1.98)	57.6 (2.27)	57.6 (2.27)	53.7 (2.11)	589.4 (23.20)
Average precipitation days (≥ 1.0 mm)	10.5	9.5	8.8	8.4	7.5	8.7	8.2	9.2	8.3	10.1	10.9	11.3	111.3
Mean monthly sunshine hours	62.4	81.4	120.2	171.0	207.0	202.7	206.2	192.1	150.7	114.0	72.5	59.6	1,639.8
Source 1: Met Office
Source 2: Starlings Roost Weather

== Other notable people ==
- George Cavendish (1497 – c. 1562) an English writer, known as the biographer of Cardinal Thomas Wolsey.
- Sir William Cavendish MP (ca.1505 – 1557) a politician, knight and courtier.

== Notes ==
a. Old English edisc or eddish are also thought to form part of the placename Brundish and the surname Standish.
