= Baron Chesham =

Title in the Peerage of the United Kingdom

Barony Chesham
- Sable three stags' heads cabossed argent
- Creation date: 15 January 1858
- Created by: Queen Victoria
- Peerage: Peerage of the United Kingdom
- First holder: The Hon. Charles Cavendish
- Present holder: Charles Cavendish, 7th Baron Chesham
- Heir apparent: The Hon. Oliver Nicholas Bruce Cavendish
- Remainder to: Heirs male of the first baron's body lawfully begotten
- Former seat: Latimer House
- Motto: Cavendo tutus (Latin for "Secure by caution")

Baron Chesham, of Chesham in the County of Buckingham, is a title in the Peerage of the United Kingdom created in 1858 for the Hon. Charles Cavendish, who had earlier represented Aylesbury, Newtown, East Sussex, Youghal and Buckinghamshire in the House of Commons as a Liberal.

The first Baron was the fourth son of George Cavendish, 1st Earl of Burlington, who was the third son of William Cavendish, 4th Duke of Devonshire. His son, the second Baron, sat as Liberal Member of Parliament for Peterborough and Buckinghamshire. He was succeeded by his son, the third Baron. He served as Master of the Buckhounds from 1900 to 1901 in the Conservative administration of Lord Salisbury and was admitted to the Privy Council in 1901. He was killed in a hunting accident in 1907, after being thrown from his horse, leaving the title to his 13-year-old son.

His grandson, the fifth Baron, served as Joint Parliamentary Secretary to the Ministry of Transport from 1959 to 1964 in the Conservative governments of Harold Macmillan and Alec Douglas-Home and was admitted to the Privy Council in 1964. He was succeeded by his son, the sixth Baron. He served in the Conservative administration of John Major as Captain of the Yeomen of the Guard (Deputy Chief Government Whip in the House of Lords) from 1995 to 1997. However, he lost his seat in the House of Lords after the passing of the House of Lords Act 1999. As of 2017 the title is held by his son, the seventh Baron, who succeeded in 2009. As a male-line descendant of the first Earl of Burlington, Baron Chesham is also in remainder to that title, which has been held by the Dukes of Devonshire since 1858.

The family seat is The Old Post House, in Ropley, Hampshire.

== Barons Chesham (1858) ==
- Charles Compton Cavendish, 1st Baron Chesham (1793–1863)
- William George Cavendish, 2nd Baron Chesham (1815–1882)
- Charles Compton William Cavendish, 3rd Baron Chesham (1850–1907)
- John Compton Cavendish, 4th Baron Chesham (1894–1952)
- John Charles Compton Cavendish, 5th Baron Chesham (1916–1989)
- Nicholas Charles Cavendish, 6th Baron Chesham (1941–2009)
- Charles Grey Compton Cavendish, 7th Baron Chesham (b. 1974)

The heir apparent is the present holder's son, the Hon. Oliver Nicholas Bruce Cavendish (b. 2007).

== See also ==
- Cavendish family
- Duke of Devonshire
- Earl of Burlington
