= George Cavendish (writer) =

English biographer of Cardinal Wolsey

- Born: 1497
- Died: 1562 (aged 64–65)
- Occupation: Writer
- Writing career
- Notable work: biography of Cardinal Thomas Wolsey

George Cavendish (1497 – c. 1562) was an English writer, best known as the biographer of Cardinal Thomas Wolsey. His Thomas Wolsey, Late Cardinall, his Lyffe and Deathe is described by the Oxford Dictionary of National Biography as the "most important single contemporary source for Wolsey's life" which also offers a "detailed picture of early sixteenth-century court life and of political events in the 1520s, particularly the divorce proceedings against Catherine of Aragon.

== Family ==
Cavendish was born in 1497, the elder son of Thomas Cavendish (d. 1524), who was a senior financial official, the "clerk of the pipe", in the Court of Exchequer, and his wife, Alice Smith of Padbrook Hall, Suffolk. He was the great-grandson of Sir John Cavendish from whom the Dukes of Devonshire and the Dukes of Newcastle inherited the family name of Cavendish. George was an English courtier and author and the brother of William Cavendish, the second husband of Bess of Hardwick. He was probably born at his father's manor of Cavendish, in Suffolk. Later the family resided in London, in the parish of St Alban, Wood Street, where Thomas Cavendish died in 1524. Around this time Cavendish married Margery Kemp, of Spains Hall, an heiress, and the niece of Sir Thomas More.

== Career ==
Probably aided by his father's position at the exchequer, in about 1522 Cavendish entered the service of Cardinal Wolsey as gentleman-usher, and stayed in his service until Wolsey's death in 1530. His position required him personally to attend the Cardinal at all times, as well as responsibilities for the lavish entertainments that Wolsey enjoyed. During this time Cavendish was often separated from his wife, children and estates. Cavendish also knew Anne Boleyn when she was first a 'debutante' at Henry VIII's court in 1522. He was adamant that she remained a virgin until her marriage, despite Catholic rumours to the contrary. However, although he attested to her sexual morals, he never forgave her for her hatred of Cardinal Wolsey or her animosity towards the Pope.

Cavendish was wholly devoted to Wolsey's interests, and also he saw in this appointment an opportunity to gratify his master-passion, a craving "to see and be acquainted with strangers, in especial with men in honour and authority." He was faithful to his master in disgrace, and showed the courage of the "loyal servitor." It is plain that he enjoyed Wolsey's closest confidence to the end, for after the cardinal's death Cavendish was called before the privy council and closely examined as to Wolsey's latest acts and words. He gave his evidence so clearly and with so much natural dignity, that he won the applause of the hostile council, and the praise of being "a just and diligent servant." He was not allowed to suffer in pocket by his fidelity to his master, but retired, as it would seem, a wealthy man to his estate of Glemsford, in West Suffolk, in 1530, having refused the offer of a position as gentleman usher from Henry VIII. He was only thirty years of age, but his appetite for being acquainted with strange acts and persons was apparently sated, for we do not hear of his engaging in any more adventures.

== Writings and influence ==
It is likely that Cavendish had taken down notes of Wolsey's conversation and movements, for many years passed before his biography was composed. Between 1554 and 1558, he wrote it out in its final form. It was not, however, possible to publish it in the author's lifetime, but it was widely circulated in manuscript. Evidently one of these manuscripts fell into the hands of William Shakespeare, for that poet made use of it in his Henry VIII, and Samuel Weller Singer even said that Shakespeare "merely put Cavendish's language into verse."

Thomas Wolsey, Late Cardinall, his Lyffe and Deathe was first printed in 1641, in a garbled text, and under the title of The Negotiations of Thomas Wolsey. The genuine text, from contemporary manuscripts, was published in 1810. Singer published the first complete edition in 1825: The Life of Cardinal Wolsey, and Metrical Visions; from the original autograph manuscript. The "metrical visions" were his tragic poems: laments in the voice of ill-fated contemporary figures like Lady Jane Grey. Until the 19th century it was believed that the book was the composition of George Cavendish's younger brother William, the owner of Chatsworth House, who also was attached to Wolsey. Joseph Hunter proved this to be impossible, and definitely asserted the claim of George. The latter is believed to have died at Glemsford before July 1562.

The intrinsic value of Cavendish's Life of Cardinal Wolsey has long been perceived, for it is the sole authentic record of a multitude of events highly important in a particularly interesting section of the history of England. Its importance as a product of biographical literature was first emphasised by Mandell Creighton, who insisted on the claim of Cavendish to be recognised as the earliest of the great English biographers, and an individual writer of charm and originality. He writes with simplicity and vividness, rarely yielding to the rhetoric which governed the ordinary prose of his age.

== Fictional portrayals ==
George Cavendish appears as a minor character in Dame Hilary Mantel's novel Wolf Hall, a fictional biography of Thomas Cromwell. Cavendish is portrayed (by Robert Wilfort in the TV adaptation) as a devoted servant who genuinely admires Wolsey; in the novel, Cromwell describes him as "a sensitive sort of man".

Actor David Oakes portrays Cavendish in David Starkey's 2009 documentary series Henry VIII: The Mind of a Tyrant.

Cavendish appears as a quiet and loyal servant in Frailty of Human Affairs by Caroline Angus. He is similarly portrayed in Cora Harrison's mystery novel, The Cardinal's Court (History Press, 2017)
