= Gernon =

Gernon is a surname. It is derived from the old English gernon, meaning moustache. Such term was derived from the Norman-introduced old French algernon. It may refer to the following notable people:

- Billy Gernon, American baseball coach;
- Edward Gernon (1800–1877), American politician from Wisconsin;
- Irvin Gernon (born 1962), English footballer;
- John Gernon, alternate spelling of John Gernoun (died c. 1357), Irish judge;
- Luke Gernon (c. 1580–c. 1672), Irish judge;
- Ranulf de Gernon, 4th Earl of Chester (1099–1153), Anglo-Norman potentate;
- Robert L. Gernon (1943–2005), American jurist;
- Thomas Gernon (born 1983), Irish academic.

== See also ==
- Gernon Bay
