= Greater Poland Uprising =

Greater Poland Uprising (also Wielkopolska Uprising or Great Poland Uprising) may refer to a number of armed rebellions in the region of Greater Poland:

- Greater Poland Uprising (1794)
- Greater Poland Uprising (1806)
- Greater Poland Uprising (1846)
- Greater Poland Uprising (1848)
- Greater Poland Uprising (1918–1919)

== See also ==
- Greater Poland (disambiguation)
