= Cavendish School =

Cavendish School may refer to:

- Cavendish School (Eastbourne)
- Cavendish School (Hemel Hempstead)
