= John Cavendish, 5th Baron Chesham =

British politician

Lord Chesham pictured in 1966

John Charles Compton Cavendish, 5th Baron Chesham, PC (18 June 1916 – 23 December 1989), was a British Conservative politician.

A member of the Cavendish family headed by the Duke of Devonshire he was the son of John Compton Cavendish, 4th Baron Chesham and his first wife, Margot Mills.

Cavendish was educated at Eton College, Lyceum Alpinum Zuoz in Switzerland, and Trinity College, Cambridge. He fought in the Second World War as a captain in the Army, also briefly serving as an air observation post pilot with No. 664 Squadron RCAF. Chesham took his seat in the House of Lords on his father's death in 1952, and later served in the Conservative administrations of Harold Macmillan and Sir Alec Douglas-Home. He was Joint Parliamentary Secretary to the Ministry of Transport from 1959 to 1964. The latter year he was also admitted to the Privy Council. Chesham was later Chairman of the International Road Federation, and President of the British Road Federation from 1966 to 1972.

A motoring enthusiast, Chesham first started motorcycling when he attended Cambridge University, riding Rex-Acme, AJS, Rudge and competing on an Excelsior at Brooklands. He joined the Royal Automobile Club as executive vice-chairman from April, 1966, then a newly created salaried position, until 1970.

Lord Chesham married Mary Edmunds Marshall, daughter of David Gregory Marshall, in 1937. He died in December 1989, aged 73, and was succeeded in the barony by his son Nicholas Charles Cavendish.

Peerage of the United Kingdom
Preceded by John Cavendish	Baron Chesham; 1952–1989	Succeeded by Nicholas Cavendish
Political offices
Preceded by The Earl of Birkenhead	Lord-in-waiting; 1955–1959	Succeeded by The Lord St Oswald
