= John Cavendish =

English judge

Sir John Cavendish
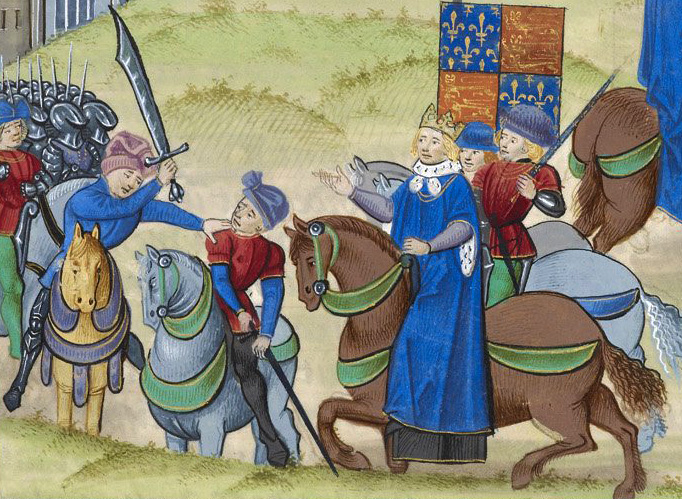
- The death of Wat Tyler (Cavendish far right, bearing decorated sword)
- Born: c. 1346; Cavendish, Suffolk, England
- Died: 15 June 1381
- Occupations: Judge, politician
- Spouse: Alice de Odingsells
- Children: John Cavendish
- Parent(s): Robert de Gernon of Grimston Hall, Trimley St Martin, Suffolk
- Relatives: Robert de Gernon (grandfather); Sir William Cavendish and George Cavendish (great-grandsons)

Sir John Cavendish (c. 1346 – 15 June 1381) was an English judge and politician from Cavendish, Suffolk, England. He and the village gave the name Cavendish to the aristocratic families of the Dukedoms of Devonshire, Newcastle and Portland.

== Biography ==
John Cavendish was descended from the Norman noble Robert de Guernon, who lived during the reign of Henry I and who gave a large amount of property to the Abbey of Gloucester. A little later a son of a Robert de Gernon, Roger de Gernon, of Grimston Hall, in Trimley St Martin, Suffolk, married the heiress of John Potton of Cavendish and obtained a landed estate in the lordship and manor of Cavendish. In consequence, his four sons exchanged their father's name for that of the estate each inherited. Until about 1500, this family are recorded as Gernon alias Cavendish.

Sir John Cavendish married Alice de Odingsells, became a lawyer and was appointed as a Justice of the Common Pleas in 1371 and Chief Justice of the King's Bench in 1372. He had one son, Andrew, who succeeded his father in the manor of Overhall, together with the advowson of Cavendish church, and the Suffolk manor of Fakenham Aspes.

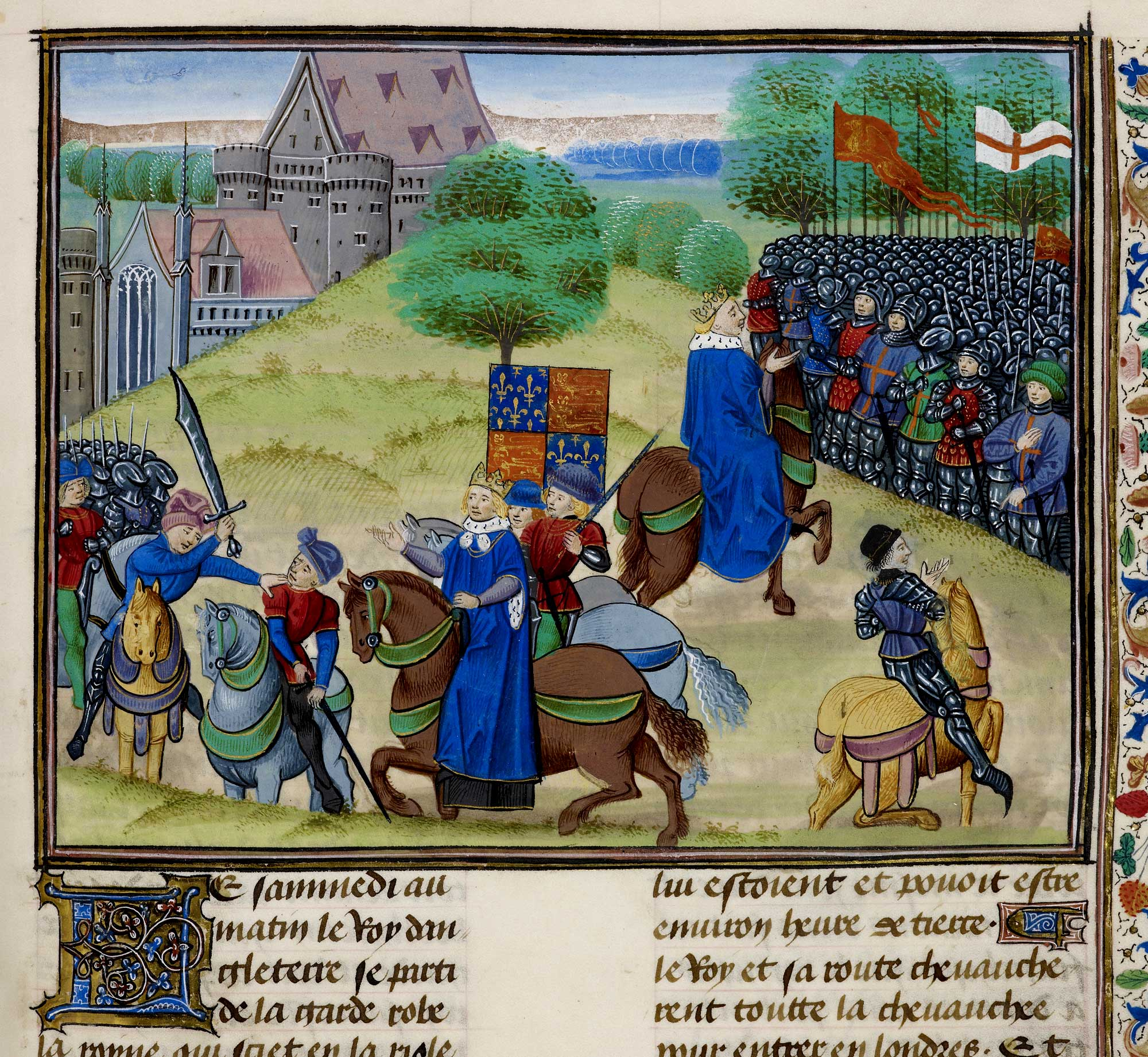
Wat Tyler's death in the Peasants' Revolt in 1381 – left to right: Sir William Walworth, Mayor of London (wielding sword); Wat Tyler; the boy king Richard II; and Sir John Cavendish, esquire to the King (bearing lance), from Froissart's Chroniques

On 15 June 1381, he was killed during the Peasants' Revolt at Bury St Edmunds.
