= Hundon =

Village in Suffolk, England

Coordinates: 52.1°N 0.55°E

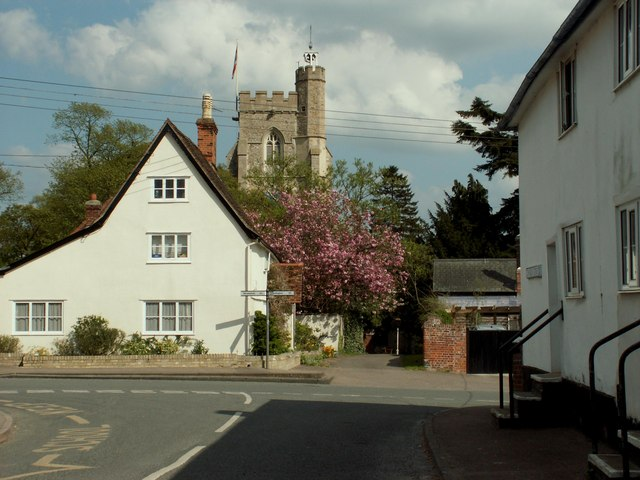
- All Saints Church

- Location within Suffolk
- Population: 1,894 (2011)
- OS grid reference: TL7348
- Civil parish: Hundon
- District: West Suffolk
- Shire county: Suffolk
- Region: East
- Country: England
- Sovereign state: United Kingdom
- Post town: SUDBURY
- Postcode district: CO10
- Dialling code: 01440
- Police: Suffolk
- Fire: Suffolk
- Ambulance: East of England
- UK Parliament: West Suffolk

Hundon is a village and civil parish in the West Suffolk district in Suffolk, England. The village is about 3 miles (5 km) north-west of the small town of Clare, and 7 miles (11 km) from the larger town of Haverhill, and includes a primary school, post office, a village hall, the Rose & Crown public house, and All Saints Parish Church. At the south-west of the parish is the hamlet of Brockley Green which includes two farms and The Plough Inn public house.
