= Henry Cavendish (disambiguation) =

Henry Cavendish (1731–1810) was a British scientist who discovered hydrogen.

Henry Cavendish may also refer to:

- Sir Henry Cavendish (politician) (1550–1616), MP for Derbyshire and libertine
- Henry Cavendish, 2nd Duke of Newcastle (1630–1691), earlier styled Viscount Mansfield
- Henry Cavendish, Earl of Ogle (1659–1680), British aristocrat
- Lord Henry Cavendish (1673–1700), MP for Derby 1695–1700
- Sir Henry Cavendish, 1st Baronet (1707–1776), British politician
- Sir Henry Cavendish, 2nd Baronet (1732–1804), Irish politician, also MP for Lostwithiel 1768–74
- Henry Cavendish (British Army officer) (1789–1873), courtier, earlier MP for Derby 1812–35
- Henry Cavendish, 3rd Baron Waterpark (1793–1863), Whig MP for Knaresborough, Derbyshire South, and Lichfield
- Henry Cavendish, 4th Baron Waterpark (1839–1912), British aristocrat and sportsman
- Lord Henry Cavendish-Bentinck (1863–1931), MP for Norfolk North-West and Nottingham South

== See also ==
- Lord George Cavendish (1810–1880) (George Henry Cavendish), MP for North Derbyshire 1834–80
- George Henry Compton Cavendish (1784–1809), MP for Aylesbury 1806–09
