= Sarah Cavendish, 1st Baroness Waterpark =

Anglo-Irish peeress (1740–1807)

The Right Honourable The Baroness Waterpark

Personal details
- Born: Sarah Bradshaw; 1 August 1740
- Died: 4 August 1807 (aged 67)
- Spouse: Sir Henry Cavendish, 2nd Baronet (m. 1757; died 1804)
- Children: 8, including Richard, George, Augustus
- Parent(s): Richard Bradshaw; Deborah Thompson Bradshaw

Sarah Cavendish, 1st Baroness Waterpark (née Bradshaw; 1 August 1740 – 4 August 1807), was an Anglo-Irish peeress.

== Early life ==
Sarah was born on 1 August 1740. She was the only daughter, and heiress, of Richard Bradshaw and his wife Deborah Bradshaw (née Thompson), a daughter of William Thompson of Cork.

== Peerage ==
On 15 June 1792, she was created Baroness Waterpark in the Peerage of Ireland, in her own right, by King George III with remainder to the heirs male of her body by Henry Cavendish. The title was created in honour of her husband, but in such a way that would enable him to continue to sit in the Irish House of Commons. He represented Lismore and Killybegs and served as Vice-Treasurer of Ireland and as Receiver-General of Ireland. From 1768 to 1774 he sat in the British House of Commons for Lostwithiel.

== Personal life ==
On 12 August 1757, she married the politician Henry Cavendish (1732–1804), the eldest son of Sir Henry Cavendish, 1st Baronet, and the former Anne Pyne (only daughter of Sir Richard Pyne, Lord Chief Justice of Ireland). Her husband succeeded as the 2nd Cavendish baronet of Doveridge Hall on 31 May 1776. Together, they were the parents of eight children, including:

- Catherine Cavendish (1758–1801), who married Philippe, Baron de Ville de Maugrémon.
- Deborah Cavendish (b. c. 1760), who married Sir Richard Musgrave, 1st Baronet, of Tourin, in 1782.
- Sarah Cavendish (1763–1849), who married Arthur Annesley, 1st Earl of Mountnorris, and had issue, including Lady Frances Webster.
- Richard Cavendish, 2nd Baron Waterpark (1765–1830), MP for Portarlington, who married Juliana Cooper, the daughter of Thomas Cooper of Mullaghmast Castle.
- George Cavendish (1766–1849), MP for St Johnstown and Cavan Borough, who served as Secretary to the Lords of the Treasury of Ireland. He married Letitia Catherine Caulfeild, daughter of James Caulfeild. After her death in 1805, he married Catherine Smyth, daughter of Ralph Smyth.
- Augustus Cavendish (1768–1832), MP for Carlow, Honiton, and Castle Rising, who took the surname Bradshaw in order to inherit a legacy from his maternal grandfather. He was the defendant in a celebrated criminal conversation action brought by George Nugent, 7th Earl of Westmeath, in 1796, and was required to pay £10000 damages. The Westmeaths later divorced and Augustus married Maryanne, the former Countess of Westmeath (mother of George Nugent, 1st Marquess of Westmeath).
- Anne Cavendish (1774–1863), who married James Browne, 2nd Baron Kilmaine.
- Hon. Frederick Cavendish (1777–1856), who married Lady Eleanor Gore, a daughter of Arthur Gore, 2nd Earl of Arran. Lady Eleanor's sister, Lady Cecilia, was the second wife of Prince Augustus Frederick, Duke of Sussex (the sixth son of King George III). After her death in 1812, he married Agnes Catherine Macdonnell, a daughter of Alexander Macdonnell, in 1817.

The Baroness Waterpark died on 4 August 1807 and was succeeded in her title by her eldest son, Richard.

Peerage of Ireland
New creation	Baroness Waterpark; 1792–1807	Succeeded by Richard Cavendish
