= Henry Lowe =

Henry Lowe may refer to:

- Henry Lowe (scientist) (born 1939), Jamaican scientist, philanthropist and businessman
- Henry Lowe (politician) (1652–1717), planter, soldier and politician in colonial Maryland
- Harry Lowe (footballer, born March 1886) (Henry Charles Lowe, 1886–1958), English footballer for Gainsborough Trinity, Liverpool and Nottingham Forest
- Harry Lowe (footballer, born 1907) (Henry Pratt Lowe, 1907–1988), Scottish born footballer for Watford and QPR

== See also ==
- Harry Lowe (disambiguation)
