= Sir Henry Cavendish, 2nd Baronet =

Anglo-Irish politician (1732–1804)

Sir Henry Cavendish, 2nd Baronet PC (29 September 1732 – 3 August 1804) was an Anglo-Irish politician noted for his extensive recording of parliamentary debates in the late 1760s and early 1770s.

== Early life ==
Cavendish was the son of Sir Henry Cavendish, 1st Baronet, and his wife Anne (née Pyne), daughter of Henry Pyne and Anne Edgcumbe, and granddaughter of Sir Richard Pyne, Lord Chief Justice of Ireland and his wife Catherine Wandesford, a granddaughter of the leading Anglo-Irish statesman Christopher Wandesford. This branch of the Cavendish family descended from Henry Cavendish, illegitimate son of Henry Cavendish of Tutbury Prior, eldest son of Sir William Cavendish and Bess of Hardwick and elder brother of William Cavendish, 1st Earl of Devonshire (the ancestor of the Dukes of Devonshire). The Pyne family were substantial landowners in County Cork, and owned the celebrated Ballyvolane House, and Mogeely Castle, Mogeely.

Cavendish was educated at Eton College from 1747 to 1748, and admitted fellow-commoner at Trinity College Dublin on 11 July 1750.

== Member of Parliament ==
He sat in the Irish House of Commons for Lismore from 1766 to 1768 and from 1776 to 1791 (when he was declared not duly elected in the 1790 election). He instead represented Killybegs from 1791 to 1797, also serving as Vice-Treasurer of Ireland and as Receiver-General in Ireland. In 1779 he was admitted to the Irish Privy Council. He again represented Lismore from 1798 to the Act of Union in 1800/01. Cavendish was also a member of the British House of Commons for Lostwithiel between 1768 and 1774.

== Parliamentary diarist ==
He is chiefly remembered for the enormous amounts of notes he took of the debates in this session of Parliament using Gurney's system of shorthand. The 1768 to 1774 Parliament has otherwise been termed the unreported Parliament, making Cavendish's notes an important historical source. During this time the reporting of parliamentary debates was forbidden. The notes, which include speeches by Edmund Burke, George Grenville, Lord North and Charles James Fox, are now stored in the British Museum.

Cavendish's original notebooks have gone missing but they were all transcribed by a clerk and fifty longhand manuscripts are in the British Library. They have 15,700 pages with nearly 3,000,000 words. There are gaps in these volumes, where the clerk could not decipher Cavendish's hand. Cavendish only managed to fill in the gaps for twelve volumes out of fifty. Selections from these volumes were published in two volumes in 1839 and 1841. The debates on American affairs were published by R. C. Simmons and P. D. G. Thomas in the twentieth century.

Cavendish also kept a record of the Irish House of Commons between 1776 and 1789 (currently in the Library of Congress). These amount to thirty-seven longhand volumes (containing more than 2,000,000 words) and forty-five of originally fifty-four shorthand journals.

According to P. D. G. Thomas, "The fullness and accuracy of both diaries, in so far as that can be established by comparison with other sources, is remarkable...fewer than 100 omissions have been detected among the 12,000 speeches he noted at Westminster, and he seems to have captured much of the debating verbatim".

== Personal life ==
Cavendish married Sarah Bradshaw, the daughter of Richard Bradshaw and Deborah Thompson, in 1757; they had eight children. In 1792 she was raised to the Peerage of Ireland as Baroness Waterpark, in the County of Dublin, in honour of her husband. Cavendish died in August 1804, aged 71, and was succeeded in the baronetcy by his son Richard. Lady Waterpark died in August 1807, aged 67. The second son, George Cavendish was a politician. The third son, Augustus, who took the surname Bradshaw in order to inherit a legacy from his grandfather, was the defendant in a celebrated criminal conversation action brought by George Frederick Nugent, 7th Earl of Westmeath in 1796, and was required to pay £10000 damages. The Westmeaths later divorced and Augustus married the former Countess. Cavendish's daughter, the younger Sarah, married Arthur Annesley, 1st Earl of Mountnorris.

== Notes ==
Parliament of Ireland
Preceded by Sir Henry Cavendish, 1st Bt; Stephen Moore	Member of Parliament for Lismore; 1766–1768; With: Sir Henry Cavendish, 1st Bt	Succeeded by Sir Henry Cavendish, 1st Bt; James Gisborne
Preceded by Sir Henry Cavendish, 1st Bt; James Gisborne	Member of Parliament for Lismore; 1776–1791; With: James Gisborne 1776–1778; Richard Musgrave 1778–1791	Succeeded by Sir Richard Musgrave, 1st Bt; Robert Paul
Preceded by Francis Nathaniel Burton; John Wolfe	Member of Parliament for Killybegs; 1791–1797; With: John Wolfe	Succeeded by Francis Nathaniel Burton; Richard Archdall
Preceded by George Ponsonby; Sir Richard Musgrave, 1st Bt	Member of Parliament for Lismore; 1798–1801; With: Sir Richard Musgrave, 1st Bt	Succeeded by Parliament of the United Kingdom
Parliament of Great Britain
Preceded by James Edward Colleton; Viscount Beauchamp	Member of Parliament for Lostwithiel; 1768–1774; With: Charles Brett	Succeeded by Charles Brett; Viscount Fairford
Baronetage of Great Britain
Preceded by Henry Cavendish	Baronet (of Doveridge Hall); 1776–1804	Succeeded by Richard Cavendish
