= George Ponsonby (Junior Lord of the Treasury) =

Irish politician

The Honourable George Ponsonby

Member of Parliament for Youghal
- In office 1826–1832
- Preceded by: John Hyde
- Succeeded by: John O'Connell

Member of Parliament for County Cork
- In office 1806–1812 Serving with Henry Boyle, Viscount Boyle, James Bernard
- Preceded by: Henry Boyle, Viscount Boyle; Robert Uniacke Fitzgerald
- Succeeded by: James Bernard; Richard Hare, Viscount Ennismore

Member of Parliament for County Kilkenny
- In office 1806–1806 Serving with James Wandesford Butler
- Preceded by: William Ponsonby; James Wandesford Butler
- Succeeded by: James Wandesford Butler; Frederick Ponsonby

Member of Parliament for Lismore
- In office 1796–1798 Serving with Sir Richard Musgrave
- Preceded by: Robert Paul; Sir Richard Musgrave
- Succeeded by: Sir Henry Cavendish, 2nd Bt; Sir Richard Musgrave

Personal details
- Born: 1773
- Died: 6 June 1863 (aged 89–90)
- Spouses: Sarah Gledstanes (m. 1807; died 1808) Diana Juliana Margaretta Bouverie (m. 1812)
- Children: 3
- Parent(s): William Ponsonby, 1st Baron Ponsonby; Hon. Louisa Molesworth
- Education: Trinity College Dublin

The Hon. George Ponsonby (1773 – 5 June 1863), was an Irish politician, who served as a Junior Lord of the Treasury in the governments under Earl Grey (his brother-in-law) and Lord Melbourne from 1832 to 1834.

== Early life ==
He was the fourth of five sons and one daughter born to William Brabazon Ponsonby by his wife, Hon. Louisa Molesworth. Among his siblings were the diplomat John Ponsonby, 1st Viscount Ponsonby, Hon. Sir William Ponsonby, a major-general in the army who was killed at the Battle of Waterloo, Richard Ponsonby, who became Bishop of Killaloe and Kilfenora, Derry, and Derry and Raphoe, and Mary Ponsonby, who married the Prime Minister, Charles Grey, 2nd Earl Grey.

His mother was the fourth daughter of Richard Molesworth, 3rd Viscount Molesworth, and the former Mary Jenney Ussher (daughter of the Rev. William Ussher, Archdeacon of Clonfert). His paternal grandparents were the Hon. John Ponsonby, the Speaker of the Irish House of Commons (and second son of Brabazon Ponsonby, 1st Earl of Bessborough) and the former Lady Elizabeth Cavendish (a daughter of William Cavendish, 3rd Duke of Devonshire). His aunt, Frances Ponsonby, was the wife of Cornelius O'Callaghan, 1st Baron Lismore.

Ponsonby graduated from Trinity College Dublin on 7 March 1791 at age 18.

== Career ==
Ponsonby was a member of Lincoln's Inn in 1794, and was called in 1797.

He represented Lismore in the Irish House of Commons between 1796 and 1798. He was then elected as a Member of Parliament at a by-election for County Kilkenny in 1806 on his father, previously the sitting member, being elevated to the peerage as 1st Baron Ponsonby of Imokilly, but a general election quickly followed when he was replaced in this seat by his younger brother, the Hon. Frederick Ponsonby.

Ponsonby subsequently succeeded his cousin, Henry Boyle, Viscount Boyle, and served as for County Cork from 1806 to 1812; for Youghal in County Cork from 1826 to 1832.

== Personal life ==
On 7 April 1807, Ponsonby was married to Sarah Gledstanes (d. 1808), a daughter of John Jacob Gledstanes of Annesgift. Before her death on 18 July 1808, they were the parents of one son, who predeceased him.

On 11 June 1812, he married Diana Juliana Margaretta Bouverie (1786–1873), the youngest daughter of the former Harriet Fawkener (daughter of Sir Everard Fawkener) and Hon. Edward Bouverie, MP for Salisbury and Northampton. After Diana's father died, her mother remarried to Lord Robert Spencer (the son of Charles Spencer, 3rd Duke of Marlborough), who was considered to be Diana's actual father, and who left her the bulk of his estate. Diana and George lived at Woolbeding House in Sussex, and were the parents of one son, and one daughter:

- Robert Wentworth Ponsonby (1814–1840), who also predeceased him.
- Diana Ponsonby (d. 1893), who married Edward Howard, 1st Baron Lanerton, the fourth son of George Howard, 6th Earl of Carlisle, and Lady Georgiana Dorothy (daughter of William Cavendish, 5th Duke of Devonshire).

Ponsonby died on 5 June 1863.

Parliament of Ireland
Preceded by Robert Paul; Sir Richard Musgrave, 1st Bt	Member of Parliament for Lismore; 1796–1797; With: Sir Richard Musgrave, 1st Bt	Succeeded by Sir Henry Cavendish, 2nd Bt; Sir Richard Musgrave, 1st Bt
Parliament of the United Kingdom
Preceded by William Ponsonby; James Wandesford Butler	Member of Parliament for County Kilkenny; 1806; With: James Wandesford Butler	Succeeded by James Wandesford Butler; Frederick Ponsonby
Preceded by Henry Boyle, Viscount Boyle; Robert Uniacke Fitzgerald	Member of Parliament for County Cork; 1806–1812; With: Henry Boyle, Viscount Boyle 1806–1807; James Bernard 1807–1812	Succeeded by James Bernard; Richard Hare, Viscount Ennismore
Preceded by John Hyde	Member of Parliament for Youghal; 1826–1832	Succeeded by John O'Connell
