= Sir James Shaen, 1st Baronet =

Anglo-Irish politician

Sir James Shaen, 1st Baronet (a.1629 – 13 December 1695) was an Anglo-Irish politician. He was an influential official in the Dublin Castle administration of Ireland during the 1670s.

== Early life and appointments ==
Shaen was the eldest son and heir of Patrick Shaen. In 1650 he married Frances FitzGerald, the youngest daughter of George FitzGerald, 16th Earl of Kildare. Following the Cromwellian conquest of Ireland, in 1654 Shaen was appointed a member of the commission for setting out lands in Connacht and County Clare for Irish opponents of Cromwell who were forcibly transported from their homes. He was appointed High Sheriff of Longford and High Sheriff of Westmeath. In 1656 he was the commander of a troop of horse in Ulster.

== Official in Dublin ==
Despite Shaen's association with the Cromwellian regime in Ireland, in October 1660, after the Stuart Restoration, he was appointed cessor, collector, and receiver general of Leinster for life. He was knighted in December 1660. In March 1661 he became registrar of the first court of claims and in September 1661 he was secretary to the Lords Justices of Ireland.

Between 1661 and 1666 he was the Member of Parliament for Clonmel in the Irish House of Commons. In late 1662, he was sent by the Duke of Ormond to London to request £60,000 from the English government of Charles II; the mission failed, but Shaen instead proposed to raise a loan on behalf of the king. On 7 February 1663 he was made a baronet, of Kilmore in the Baronetage of Ireland. In May of that year he became one of the original Fellows of the Royal Society. In 1667 he was appointed Surveyor General of Ireland for life.

In the 1670s, Shaen was involved in a series of proposed Irish revenue schemes under the direction of John Berkeley, 1st Baron Berkeley of Stratton. Between 1677 and 1679 he was engaged in an intense struggle for control of the Irish revenue with the Earl of Ranelagh and the Earl of Danby. Shaen's approach to taxation was criticised by Ranelagh and he was suspected of corruption by Ormond; the collapse of one his schemes in 1682, amid disarray and disputed accounts, effectively marked the end of the system of taxation which he had developed. After this, he largely disappeared from public life, playing no part in the Williamite War in Ireland, although he represented Baltinglass in the Irish Commons from 1692 to 1695.

== Death and succession ==
Shaen died on 13 December 1695, and was succeeded in his extensive estates and baronetcy by his only child, Arthur, who sat in the Irish Commons for Lismore in every parliament from 1692 until his death. Upon Arthur's death, the title became extinct.

Parliament of Ireland
Preceded by Sir Thomas Stanley; Sir Francis Foulke	Member of Parliament for Clonmel; 1661–1666; With: Sir Francis Foulke	Succeeded by Nicholas White; John Bray
Preceded by Not represented in the Patriot Parliament	Member of Parliament for Baltinglass; 1692–1695; With: Richard Thompson	Succeeded by Charles Ricasey; Richard Thompson
Baronetage of Ireland
New creation	Baronet (of Kilmore); 1663–1695	Succeeded by Arthur Shaen
