= Loyalism =

Allegiance to the British crown or the United Kingdom

Loyalists support the United Kingdom or the British crown.

Loyalism, in the United Kingdom, its overseas territories and its former colonies, refers to the allegiance to the British crown or the United Kingdom. In North America, the most common usage of the term refers to historical loyalty to the British Crown, notably with the loyalist opponents of the American Revolution, and United Empire Loyalists who moved to the remaining colonies of British North America after the revolution. In France, its overseas territories and its former colonies, it refers to allegiance to the French Republic.

== Historical loyalism ==
=== 18th century ===
==== North America ====
In North America, the term loyalist characterised colonists who rejected the American Revolution in favour of remaining loyal to the king. American loyalists included royal officials, Anglican clergymen, wealthy merchants with ties to London, demobilised British soldiers, and recent arrivals (especially from Scotland), as well as many ordinary colonists who were conservative by nature and/or felt that the protection of Britain was needed. Colonists with loyalist views accounted for an estimated 15 per cent to 20 per cent of the white colonial population of the day, compared with those described as "Patriots", who accounted for about 40–50 per cent of the population and the rest neutrals. This high level of political polarisation leads historians to argue that the American Revolution was as much a civil war as it was a war of independence from the British Crown.

British military strategy during the American Revolution relied on mobilising loyalist soldiers throughout the Thirteen Colonies. Throughout the war, the British military formed over 100 loyalist line regiments whose strength totaled 19,000 of which 9,700 served most at one time. Including militia and marine forces more than 50,000 served. The Patriots used tactics such as property confiscation to suppress loyalism and drive active loyalists away.

After the war, approximately 80–90 per cent of the Loyalists stayed in the new United States, and adapted to the new conditions and changes of a republic.

===== Loyalist migrants =====
Loyalist refugees on their way to Canada during the American Revolution

Of the 62,000 who left by 1784, almost 50,000 sought refuge elsewhere in the British North American colonies of Quebec (partitioned into the Canadas in 1791), New Brunswick, Nova Scotia, and St. John's Island; (Note: St. John's Island was renamed Prince Edward Island in 1798.) whereas the remaining loyalist migrants went to Jamaica, the Bahamas and Britain, often with financial help from the Crown. They were joined by 30,000 or more "Late Loyalists" who settled in Ontario in the early 1790s at the invitation of the British administration and given land and low taxes in exchange for swearing allegiance to the King, for a total of 70,000+ new settlers. There were in fact four waves of emigration: in the years 1774 through 1776 when for example 1300 Tories were evacuated with the British fleet that left Boston for Halifax; the large wave of 50,000 in the years 1783; some few thousands who had stayed in the new Republic but left disenchanted with the results of the revolution for Upper Canada between 1784 and 1790; and the large number 'Late Loyalists,' 30,000, who came in the early 1790s for land, many of them neutrals during the War, to Upper Canada; they soon outnumbered the original truly committed anti-Republicans, 10,000, who had earlier arrived: some Loyalists about 10 per cent maybe from New Brunswick returned to the States as did an unknown number from Nova Scotia. This migration also included indigenous loyalists such as Mohawk leader Joseph Brant, the "Black Loyalists" – former slaves who had joined the British cause in exchange for their freedom, and Anabaptist loyalists (Mennonites).

These Loyalists were the founders of modern English-speaking Canada, and many of their descendants of these King's Loyal Americans still identify themselves with the nominal hereditary title "UEL" (United Empire Loyalist) today. To one degree or another, from ideological reasons or less so mixed with prospects of a better life, "All the Loyalists had taken a stand for the Crown and the British Empire"...whether "from a rigorous toryism to some vague sense that royal government was hardly so evil as its enemies claimed. In Canada this diversity was preserved. The Loyalist communities were rarely unanimous – or placid – in their politics".

==== Ireland ====
The term loyalist was first used in Irish politics in the 1790s to refer to Protestant Irishmen (often of English or Scottish ancestry) who opposed Catholic Emancipation and Irish independence from the British Empire. Prominent Irish loyalists included John Foster, John Fitzgibbon and John Beresford. In the subsequent Irish Rebellion of 1798, the term ultra loyalist was used to describe those who were opposed to the United Irishmen, who were in support of an independent Irish Republic. In 1795, Ulster loyalists founded the Orange Order and organised the Yeoman Militia, which helped to put down the rebellion. Some loyalists, such as Richard Musgrave, considered the rebellion a Catholic plot to drive Protestant colonists out of Ireland.

=== 19th century ===
==== Australia ====
The Sydney and Parramatta Loyalist Associations, with approximately 50 members each, were formed in 1804 to counter radical societies in those counties, and subsequently helped to put down the Castle Hill convict rebellion later that year.

==== England and Wales ====
During the early 19th century, nearly every English and Welsh county formed a Loyalist Association of Workers in an effort to counter a perceived threat from radical societies. The first such association was founded in Westminster on 20 November 1792.

== Modern loyalism ==
=== Northern Ireland ===
Generally, the term loyalist in Northern Ireland is typified by a militant opposition to Irish republicanism, and also often to Roman Catholicism. It stresses Ulster Protestant identity and community with its own folk heroes and events, such as the actions of the 36th (Ulster) Division during World War I and the activities of the Orange Order. An Ulster loyalist is most commonly a unionist who strongly favours the political union between Great Britain and Northern Ireland, although some may also support an independent Northern Ireland. In recent times, the term has been used to refer to several loyalist paramilitary groups, such as the Ulster Defence Association (UDA), Ulster Volunteer Force (UVF), Red Hand Commando (RHC) and the Loyalist Volunteer Force (LVF).

Although Irish loyalist paramilitaries have claimed to speak on behalf of their communities and unionists in general, their electoral support is minimal and exclusively based in the urban working class. The Progressive Unionist Party, a pro-Belfast Agreement loyalist party, won seats in the Northern Ireland Assembly in 1998, 2003 and 2007, but lost them in 2011.

=== Republic of Ireland ===
Loyalism in the post-partition Republic of Ireland has declined since independence. Large numbers of southern Irish loyalists and non-loyalists volunteered for service in the British Armed Forces in World War I and World War II, many of them losing their lives or settling in the United Kingdom after the wars. Partition saw mass movements of southern loyalists to Northern Ireland or to Great Britain, although small loyalist or neo-unionist groups are still active.

=== Scotland ===
The Scottish loyalist movement originated during the Industrial Revolution when a significant number of Ulster Protestants migrated to Scotland from Ireland. In Scotland, a loyalist is someone on the fringes of Scottish unionism who is often strongly supportive of loyalism and unionism, although mainly concentrating on the Irish union issue rather than on Scottish politics. Scottish loyalism is typified by militant opposition to Scottish republicanism, Scottish independence.

Coming from a large section of Scottish society Scottish loyalism has become more visible through prominent demonstrations of the beliefs of its members since the establishment of a Scottish Parliament. Scottish loyalism is visible through participation at Orange parades with supporters from Rangers, Heart of Midlothian F.C. and Airdrie United. Loyalists in Scotland mostly live in small working-class enclaves in the major urban centres or industrial villages, notably Glasgow, Lanarkshire, Edinburgh, Renfrewshire, Fife, West Lothian and Ayrshire. There are relatively few loyalists in areas such as Aberdeen, the Scottish Borders and the Scottish Highlands.

== See also ==
- Legitimist
- Monarchism
- Reactionary
- Royalist
