= George Cavendish (Irish politician) =

Anglo-Irish politician

George Cavendish (26 August 1766 – 13 February 1849), styled The Honourable from 1792, was an Anglo-Irish politician.

Cavendish was the son of Sir Henry Cavendish, 2nd Baronet and Sarah Bradshaw, who was created Baroness Waterpark in 1792. He served in the Irish House of Commons as the Member of Parliament for St Johnstown between 1790 and 1797, before representing Cavan Borough between 1798 and its disenfranchisement in 1800. He later served as Secretary to the Lords of the Treasury of Ireland.

On 26 February 1803, Cavendish married Letitia Catherine Caulfeild, daughter of James Caulfeild. Following her death in 1805, he married secondly Catherine Smyth, daughter of Ralph Smyth, on 15 November 1807.

Parliament of Ireland
Preceded by Sir Thomas Fetherston, Bt; Nicholas Colthurst	Member of Parliament for St Johnstown; 1790–1797; With: John Taylor	Succeeded by Sir William Gleadowe-Newcomen, Bt; Francis Hardy
Preceded by Viscount Clements; Thomas Nesbitt	Member of Parliament for Cavan Borough; 1798–1800; With: Thomas Nesbitt	Succeeded by Constituency disenfranchised
