= Eyam Moor =

Hill in the Derbyshire Peak District

Coordinates: 53°18′18″N 1°40′19″W

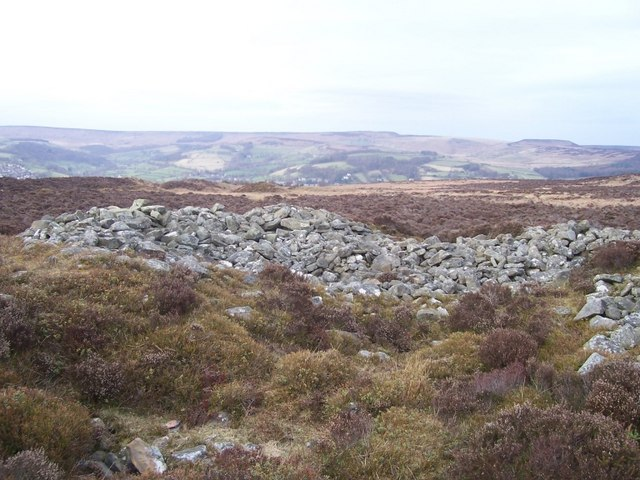
- Eyam Moor Barrow

Highest point
- Elevation: 429 metres (1,407 ft) Sir William Hill

Geography
- Location: Peak District, England
- OS grid: SK224788
- Topo map: OS Explorer OL24

Eyam Moor is a plateau-topped hill between the villages of Eyam and Hathersage in Derbyshire, in the Peak District of England. The summit of Sir William Hill is 429 metres (1,407 ft) above sea level.

It is unclear whom Sir William Hill is named after. Candidates include the four Dukes of Devonshire called Sir William Cavendish, Sir William Saville (Lord of the Manor of Eyam) and Sir William Bagshaw (High Sheriff for Derbyshire in 1805). The radio mast on top of Sir William Hill is a prominent local landmark. Sir William Hill Road is an ancient packhorse route across the moor and was part of the Sheffield to Buxton Turnpike of 1758. The Barrel Inn on Sir William Hill Road at Bretton is the highest pub in Derbyshire.

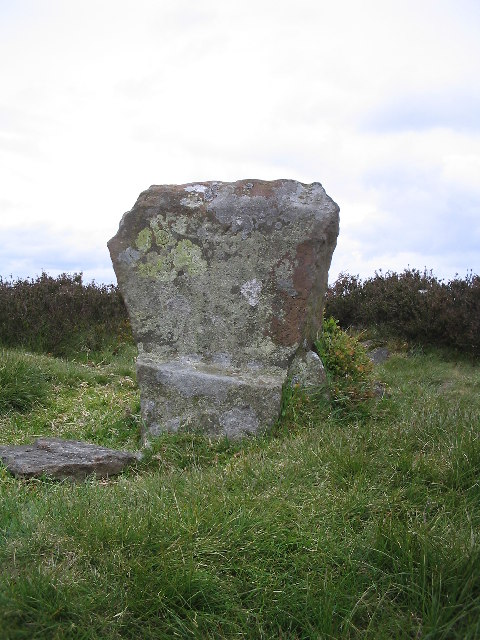
Chair Stone of Wet Withens

There are three stone circles on Eyam Moor. Wet Withens (known as Eyam Moor 1) is a Bronze Age stone circle at the centre of Eyam Moor with an earthen bank over 30m wide. The prehistoric henge of 10 upright stones (orthostats) is a protected Scheduled Monument. The other embanked stone circle (Eyam Moor 2) on the eastern edge of the moor is also Bronze Age and is about 13m across. Nearby is Eyam Moor 3, a third Bronze Age small circle of 13m diameter with six remaining free-standing stones, without an embankment. Both of these smaller henges are also Scheduled Monuments, as well as numerous prehistoric cairns spread across the moor.

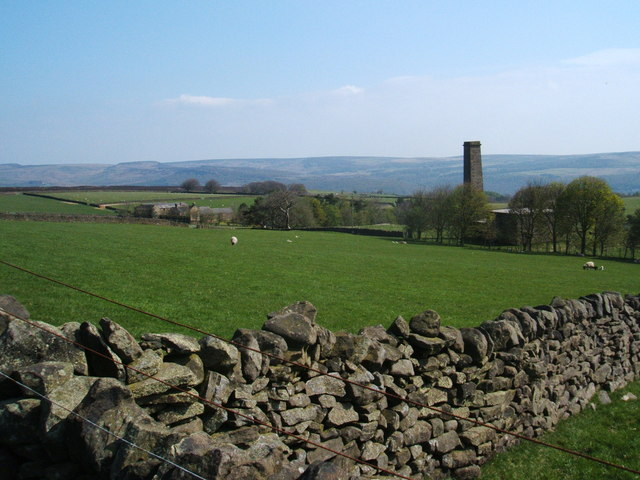
Ladywash fluorspar mine

Ladywash Mine on the southern edge of Eyam Moor was an old lead mine and was also used to produce fluorspar for the steel industry between 1936 and 1979.

Following the Countryside and Rights of Way Act 2000, this gritstone moorland plateau became "Open Access" land for the public. There are footpaths across the moor, leading from roadside car parking on Sir William Hill Road between Eyam and Grindleford.
