= Shaen baronets =

Extinct baronetcy in the Baronetage of Ireland

The Shaen Baronetcy, of Kilmore in the County of Roscommon, was a title in the Baronetage of Ireland. It was created on 7 February 1663 for James Shaen, subsequently a member of the Irish House of Commons for Baltinglass, and a political figure of considerable importance in the 1660s and 1670s. The second Baronet represented Lismore in the Irish Parliament. The title became extinct on his death in 1725. The Shaens were descended from Sir Francis Farrell (died 1614) of Granard, County Longford, who took an oath of loyalty to Queen Elizabeth I c.1598, was knighted, and changed his name to Shaen.

== Shaen baronets, of Kilmore (1663) ==
- Sir James Shaen, 1st Baronet (died 1695)
- Sir Arthur Shaen, 2nd Baronet (born after 1650–1725)
