= James Jeffreys =

Anglo-Irish soldier and politician

Brigadier General Sir James Jeffreys (c. 1650 – 1722), also spelt Jeffereyes, was an Anglo-Irish soldier and politician, who served in the armies of both Charles XI of Sweden and William III of England.

== Biography ==
Born in England, Jeffreys joined the Swedish Army and was likely a member of the Swedish contingent in the service of Leopold I, Holy Roman Emperor during the Great Turkish War. He attained the rank of lieutenant-colonel. In January 1690, Jeffreys applied through the English envoy in Sweden to leave Swedish service and join the army of William III. His application was accompanied by a letter of commendation from Charles XI which praised Jeffreys' bravery.

He travelled to London and on 30 May 1690 received a brevet commission as a "colonel of foot". Jeffreys participated in the Williamite War in Ireland. On 4 September 1690 he was made Governor of Duncannon Fort. In the autumn of 1697, the Parliament of Ireland heard a series of complaints about Jeffreys's actions in Duncannon and in 1698 he was removed to become Governor of Cork, exchanging commands with Toby Purcell. His unpopularity in Cork led the English government to abolish the position of governor of the castle in May 1699. Jeffreys petitioned William III to be reinstated as Governor of Cork, which he was in 1700. The position allowed Jeffreys to amass considerable wealth, with which he purchased Blarney Castle.

He successfully petitioned Queen Anne and George I to maintain his position in Cork, which was accompanied by a generous pension. Between 1703 and 1715 he was the Member of Parliament for Lismore in the Irish House of Commons. Jeffreys was promoted to brigadier general in 1704, and to "brigadier general of all forces of Her Majesty's Service" in 1709.

He married a Swedish woman, Katherine Drokenhellem, and was the father of James Jeffreys.

Parliament of Ireland
Preceded by George Rogers; Sir Arthur Shaen, Bt	Member of Parliament for Lismore; 1703–1715; With: Sir Arthur Shaen, Bt	Succeeded by Thomas Meredyth; Sir Arthur Shaen, Bt
