= Sir Arthur Shaen, 2nd Baronet =

Anglo-Irish politician

Sir Arthur Shaen, 2nd Baronet (c.1650 – 24 June 1725) was an Anglo-Irish politician.

== Biography ==
Shaen was the son of Sir James Shaen, 1st Baronet and Frances FitzGerald, a daughter of George FitzGerald, 16th Earl of Kildare. Between 1692 and his death in 1725, he was the Member of Parliament for Lismore in the Irish House of Commons. On 13 December 1695 he succeeded to his father's baronetcy. Shaen was High Sheriff of Mayo in 1708 and High Sheriff of Roscommon in 1709 and 1718.

He was married twice; firstly to Jane Hele, daughter and heiress of Sir Samuel Hele, 2nd Baronet, and secondly to Susanna Magan, by whom he had two daughters. On his death without male heirs, his title became extinct.

Parliament of Ireland
Preceded by Adam Loftus; William Fitzgerald	Lismore; 1692–1725; With: George Rogers (1692–1703); Sir James Jeffreys (1703–1715); Thomas Meredyth (1715–1719); Sir John Osborne, Bt (1719–1725)	Succeeded by Sir John Osborne, Bt; Hugh Dixon
Baronetage of Ireland
Preceded by James Shaen	Baronet (of Kilmore); 1695–1725	Extinct
