= Baron Waterpark =

Title in the Peerage of Ireland

Barony of Waterpark
- 1 Quarterly: 1st & 4th, Sable, three bucks heads caboshed argent attired or within a border of the second (Cavendish); 2nd & 3rd: Argent, two bendlets, the upper sable and lower gules (Bradshaw)
- Creation date: 14 June 1792
- Created by: George III
- Peerage: Peerage of Ireland
- First holder: Sarah, Lady Cavendish
- Present holder: Roderick Cavendish, 8th Baron Waterpark
- Heir apparent: Hon. Luke Cavendish
- Remainder to: Heirs male of the first baroness's body
- Status: Extant
- Former seat: Doveridge Hall
- Motto: Cavendo tutus ("Secure by caution")

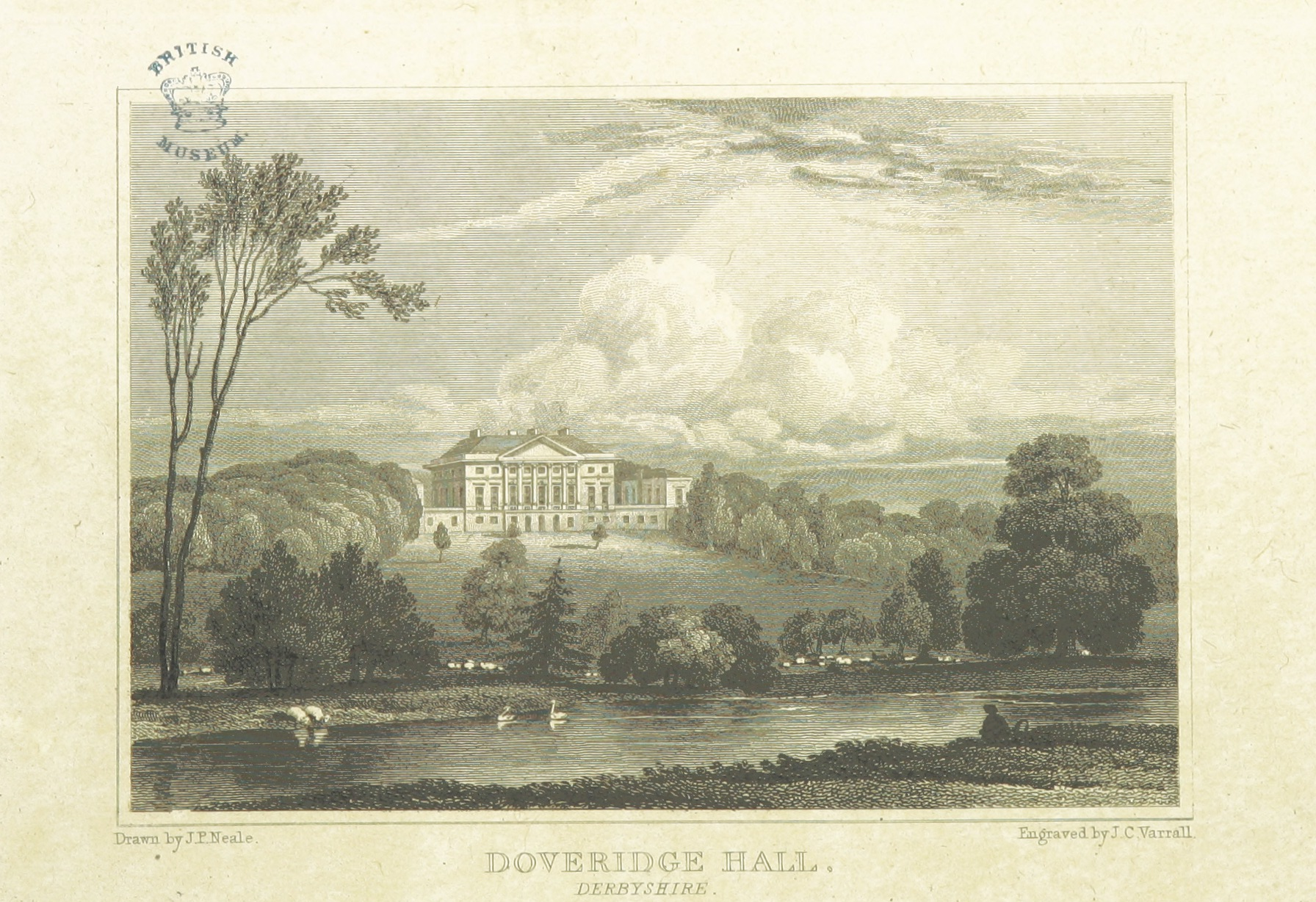
Doveridge Hall, Derbyshire

Baron Waterpark of Waterpark in the County of Cork, is a title in the Peerage of Ireland. It was created in 1792 for Sarah, Lady Cavendish, in honour of her husband, Sir Henry Cavendish, 2nd Baronet. Sir Henry Cavendish was a politician who represented Lismore and Killybegs in the Irish House of Commons and served as Vice-Treasurer of Ireland and as Receiver-General of Ireland. From 1768 to 1774 he sat in the British House of Commons for Lostwithiel.

Cavendish and Lady Waterpark were both succeeded by their son Richard, the second Baron and third Baronet. His eldest son, the third Baron, represented Knaresborough, Derbyshire South and Lichfield in the House of Commons as a Liberal and served as a Lord-in-waiting (government whip) under Lord John Russell, Lord Aberdeen and Lord Palmerston. This line of the family failed on the death of his grandson, the fifth Baron, in 1932. The late Baron was succeeded by his second cousin, the sixth Baron. He was the grandson of a younger son of the second Baron. As of 2013, the titles are held by the latter's great-nephew, the eighth Baron, who succeeded in that year.

The Cavendish baronetcy, of Doveridge Hall, was created in the Baronetage of Great Britain in 1755 for Henry Cavendish. He notably represented Lismore in the Irish House of Commons. He was succeeded by his son, the aforementioned Sir Henry Cavendish, 2nd Baronet. The Cavendishes of Doveridge were descended from Henry Cavendish, illegitimate son of another Henry Cavendish, of Tutbury Priory. This Henry was the eldest son of Sir William Cavendish by his wife Bess of Hardwick, and thus elder brother of William Cavendish, 1st Earl of Devonshire.

The family seat of Doveridge Hall was demolished about 1938. There were other illegitimate sons sired in Derbyshire by Henry Cavendish. One son, Robert Cavendish, was allegedly the result of a lifelong relationship with a mistress whom he kept at Ufton Manor in Oakerthorpe.

== Cavendish baronets of Doveridge Hall (1755) ==
- Sir Henry Cavendish, 1st Baronet (1707–1776)
- Sir Henry Cavendish, 2nd Baronet (1732–1804)
- Sir Richard Cavendish, 3rd Baronet (1765–1830) (succeeded as Baron Waterpark in 1807)

=== Barons Waterpark (1792) ===
- Sarah Cavendish, 1st Baroness Waterpark (1740–1807)
- Richard Cavendish, 2nd Baron Waterpark (1765–1830)
- Henry Manners Cavendish, 3rd Baron Waterpark (1793–1863)
- Henry Anson Cavendish, 4th Baron Waterpark (1839–1912)
- Charles Frederick Cavendish, 5th Baron Waterpark (1883–1932)
- Henry Sheppard Hart Cavendish, 6th Baron Waterpark (1876–1948)
- Frederick Caryll Phillip Cavendish, 7th Baron Waterpark (1926–2013)
- Roderick Alexander Cavendish, 8th Baron Waterpark (born 1959)

The heir apparent is the present holder's son, the Hon. Luke Frederick Cavendish (born 1990).

=== Title succession chart ===
Title succession chart, Cavendish baronets, of Doveridge Hall, and Barons/Baronesses Waterpark.

Sir Henry Cavendish; 1st Baronet; 1707–1776
Baron(ess) Waterpark
Sir Henry Cavendish; 2nd Baronet; 1732–1804	Sarah Cavendish; 1st Baroness Waterpark (née Bradshaw); 1740–1807
Richard Cavendish; 2nd Baron Waterpark; 3rd Baronet; 1765–1830
Henry Cavendish; 3rd Baron Waterpark; 1793–1863	Hon. Richard Cavendish; 1794–1876
Henry Cavendish; 4th Baron Waterpark; 1839–1912	William Cavendish; 1843–1878
Hon. Henry Cavendish; 1875–1897	Charles Cavendish; 5th Baron Waterpark; 1883–1932	Henry Cavendish; 6th Baron Waterpark; 1876–1948	Brig. Gen. Frederick Cavendish; 1877–1931
Frederick Cavendish; 7th Baron Waterpark; 1926–2013
Roderick Cavendish; 8th Baron Waterpark; 9th Baronet born 1959
Hon. Luke Cavendish born 1990

== See also ==
- Duke of Devonshire

Baronetage of Great Britain
Preceded by Mann baronets	Cavendish baronets of Doveridge Hall; 7 May 1755	Succeeded by Johnson baronets
