= Richard Cavendish, 2nd Baron Waterpark =

Anglo-Irish politician and peer

Richard Cavendish, 2nd Baron Waterpark FSA (13 July 1765 – 1 June 1830), was an Anglo-Irish politician and peer.

== Early life ==
Waterpark was the son of Sir Henry Cavendish, 2nd Baronet and Sarah Cavendish, 1st Baroness Waterpark.

Waterpark succeeded to his father's baronetcy in 1804 and his mother's barony in 1807, at which point the two titles merged.

== Career ==
He sat in the Irish House of Commons as the Member of Parliament for Portarlington between 1790 and 1797. He was a fellow of the Society of Antiquaries of London.

== Personal life ==
On 6 August 1789, he was married to Juliana Cooper, the daughter of Thomas Cooper. Together they had nine children.

He was succeeded by his eldest son, Henry Cavendish.

Parliament of Ireland
Preceded by Boyle Roche; Robert Hobart	Portarlington; 1790–1797; With: William Browne	Succeeded by Sir John Parnell; John Stewart
Peerage of Ireland
Preceded by Sarah Cavendish	Baron Waterpark; 1807–1830	Succeeded by Henry Cavendish
Baronetage of Ireland
Preceded by Henry Cavendish	Baronet (of Doveridge Hall); 1804–1830	Succeeded by Henry Cavendish
