= Harry Lowe =

Harry Lowe may refer to:

- Harry Lowe (footballer, born March 1886) (1886–1958), English footballer for Gainsborough Trinity, Liverpool and Nottingham Forest
- Harry Lowe (footballer, born August 1886) (1886–1966), English footballer for Northwich Victoria, Brighton & Hove Albion, Tottenham Hotspur and Fulham
- Harry Lowe (footballer, born 1907) (1907–1988), Scottish born footballer for Watford and QPR
- Harry James Lowe Jr. (1922–1942), American World War II sailor

== See also ==
- Harry Low (1882–1920), Scottish footballer
- Harold Lowe (1882–1944), officer on the Titanic
