= William Cavendish =

William Cavendish may refer to:

== Earls ==
- William Cavendish, 1st Earl of Devonshire (1552–1626)
- William Cavendish, 2nd Earl of Devonshire (1591–1628)
- William Cavendish, 3rd Earl of Devonshire (1617–1684)

== Dukes ==
- William Cavendish, 1st Duke of Newcastle (1592–1676)
- William Cavendish, 1st Duke of Devonshire (1640–1707)
- William Cavendish, 2nd Duke of Devonshire (1672–1729)
- William Cavendish, 3rd Duke of Devonshire (1698–1755)
- William Cavendish, 4th Duke of Devonshire (1720–1764), British prime minister
- William Cavendish, 5th Duke of Devonshire (1748–1811)
- William Cavendish, 6th Duke of Devonshire (1790–1858)
- William Cavendish, 7th Duke of Devonshire (1808–1891)
- William Cavendish-Bentinck, 3rd Duke of Portland (1738–1809)
- William Cavendish-Scott-Bentinck, 5th Duke of Portland (1800–1879)

== Others ==
- William Cavendish (courtier) (1505–1557), English courtier
- William Cavendish (English politician, born 1783) (died 1812), son of Lord George Augustus Henry Cavendish, later 1st Earl of Burlington
- William Cavendish, 2nd Baron Chesham (1815–1882)
- William Cavendish, Marquess of Hartington (1917–1944), son of Edward Cavendish, the 10th Duke and elder brother of the 11th
- William Cavendish, Earl of Burlington (born 1969), son of Peregrine Cavendish, 12th Duke of Devonshire
- William Hunter Cavendish (c. 1740–1818), colonial pioneer
