= Wet Withens =

Stone circle in Derbyshire, England

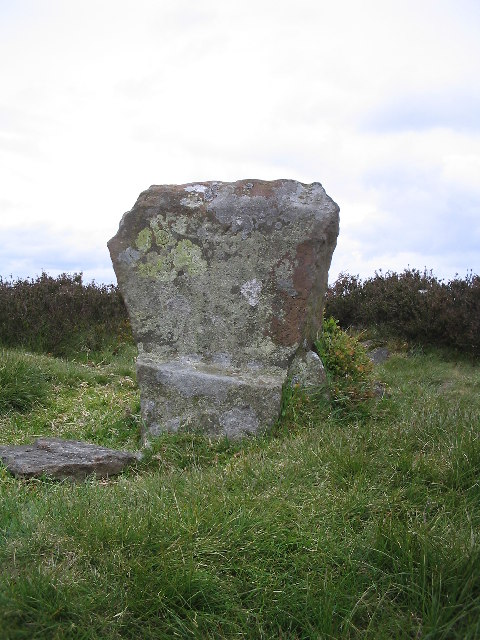
- Chair Stone
- Interactive map of Wet Withens
- 53°18′27″N 1°39′47″W
- Type: Henge monument
- Location: Eyam Moor near Grindleford
- Region: Derbyshire, England

Scheduled monument
- Official name: Embanked stone circle known as Wet Withens, and adjacent cairn
- Designated: 9 October 1981
- Reference no.: 1018480

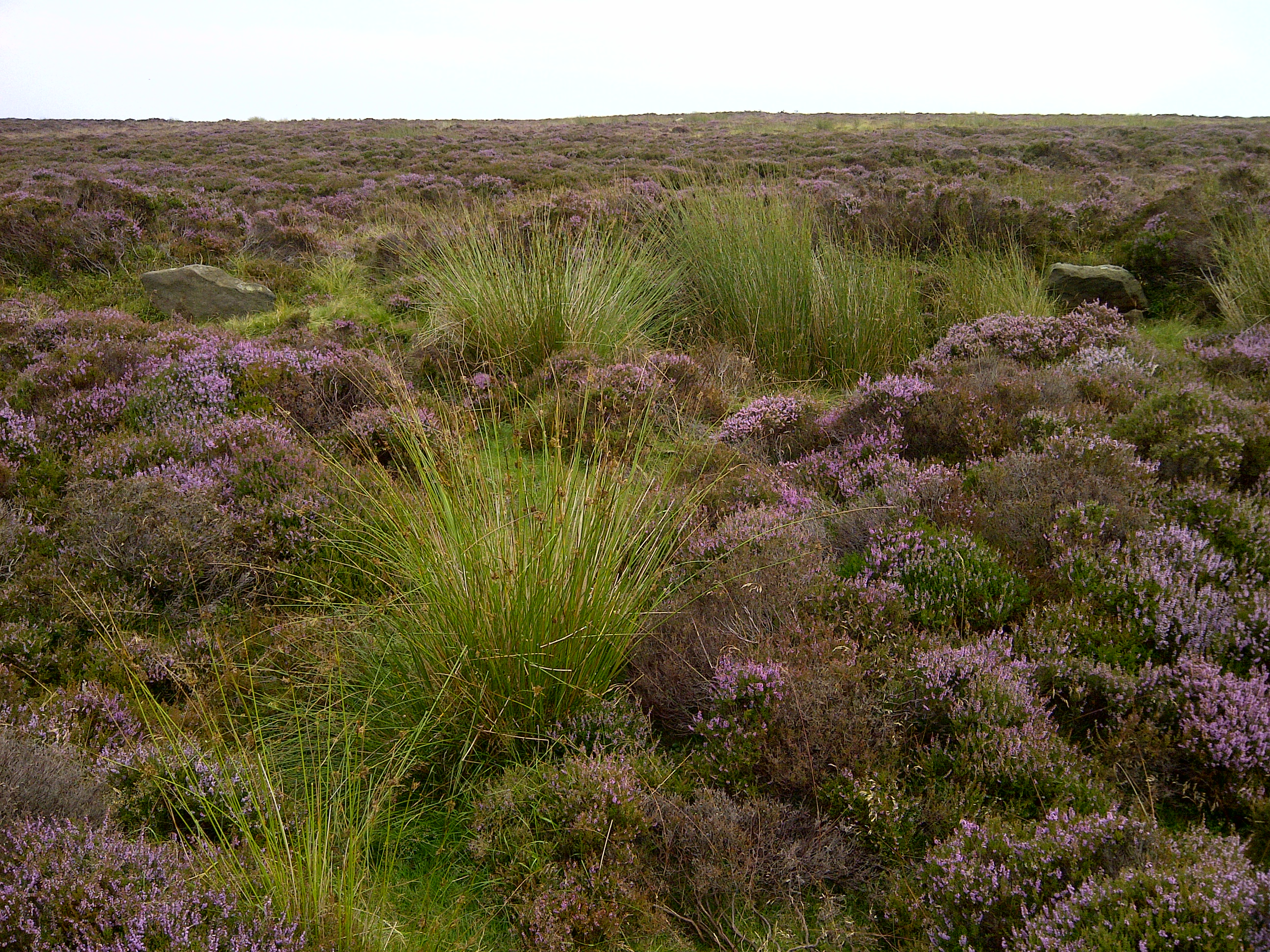
Eyam Moor from Wet Withens Stone Circle

Wet Withens is a Bronze Age henge on Eyam Moor in the Derbyshire Peak District, England. The prehistoric circle of 10 upright stones (orthostats) is a protected Scheduled Monument.

It is sometimes known as Wet Withers (Old English for 'the wet land where willows grew').

On gritstone moorland over 300 metres above sea level, the site has clear views of the valley of the River Derwent and Higger Tor. The site is well away from public footpaths but is on "Open Access" land following the Countryside and Rights of Way Act 2000. The earthen bank of Wet Withens is over 30m in diameter, making it the largest embanked stone circle in Derbyshire. Most of the stones of the ring are quite hidden amongst the heather and reeds. 7 stones are still upright but some of those are leaning inwards. The 'Chair Stone' (70cm high) is the tallest and most prominent stone with a ledge cut out of its face, appearing as a seat. There could have been up to 18 stones originally if the stones had been spaced out evenly.

About 10m north of the henge is a large stone cairn (known as Eyam Moor Barrow) about 27m long and 1m high. The cairn has been damaged from quarrying and/or excavation activity over the centuries. Near the middle of the cairn is an unusual cup-marked stone. The cairn's shape indicates that it was likely to have been a prehistoric burial barrow.

Wet Withens is also known as Eyam Moor 1 because there are 2 smaller stone circles about 650m to the east, which are also Scheduled Monuments: Eyam Moor 2 and Eyam Moor 3.

There are a number of other ancient henges in Derbyshire including Arbor Low, The Bull Ring, Doll Tor, Hordron Edge, Nine Stone Close and Twyford Henge.
