= Henry Cavendish, 3rd Baron Waterpark =

British aristocrat and politician

Henry Manners Cavendish, 3rd Baron Waterpark (8 November 1793 – 31 March 1863), was a British nobleman and Whig politician.

Waterpark was the son of Richard Cavendish, 2nd Baron Waterpark, and his wife Juliana (née Cooper). He succeeded his father in the barony in 1830 but as this was an Irish peerage it did not entitle him to an automatic seat in the House of Lords. The same year he was instead elected to the House of Commons as one of two representatives for Knaresborough, a seat he held until 1832, and then sat for Derbyshire South from 1832 to 1835. He served as a Lord-in-waiting between 1846 and 1852, and again from 1853 to 1858. He returned to the House of Commons in 1854 when he was elected for Lichfield, and sat for this constituency until 1856. Between 1859 and 1861 he was a Lord of the Bedchamber to Albert, Prince Consort.

He was the lieutenant-colonel of the disembodied King's Own Staffordshire Militia until he resigned in June 1832, having been appointed colonel of the Derbyshire Militia on 12 April that year. He remained colonel when the militia was revived in 1852, until his death.

Lord Waterpark married the Hon. Eliza Jane, daughter of Thomas Anson, 1st Viscount Anson, in 1837. He died in March 1863, aged 69, and was succeeded in the barony by his son, Henry. Lady Waterpark, who was a Member of the Royal Order of Victoria and Albert, died in September 1894. They had three children:

- Hon Henry Anson Cavendish, later 4th Baron, born 14 April 1839, died 3 August 1912.
- Hon Eliza Anne Cavendish, married Haughton Charles Okeover and died 11 December 1921.
- Hon Adelaide Cavendish, maid of honour to Queen Victoria, married Samuel William Clowes and died 20 April 1925.

== Notes ==
Parliament of the United Kingdom
Preceded by Sir James Mackintosh; Henry Brougham	Member of Parliament for Knaresborough; 1830–1832; With: Sir James Mackintosh 1830–1832; Hon. William Ponsonby 1832	Succeeded by John Richards; Benjamin Rotch
New constituency	Member of Parliament for Derbyshire South; 1832–1835; With: George Venables-Vernon	Succeeded by Sir George Harpur Crewe; Sir Roger Gresley
Preceded by Lord Alfred Paget; Viscount Anson	Member of Parliament for Lichfield; 1854–1856; With: Lord Alfred Paget	Succeeded by Lord Alfred Paget; Viscount Sandon
Peerage of Ireland
Preceded by Richard Cavendish	Baron Waterpark; 1830–1863	Succeeded by Henry Cavendish
