= William Ussher =

William Ussher (1718–1780) was an 18th-century Irish Anglican priest.

Ussher was born in County Armagh and educated at Trinity College Dublin. He was ordained deacon in 1741; and priest in 1742. He held incumbencies at Kilmactalway and Clondalkin. He was appointed Archdeacon of Glendalough in 1752 and resigned in 1760.
