= Henry Cavendish (politician) =

English soldier and traveller

The Right Honourable Sir Henry Cavendish
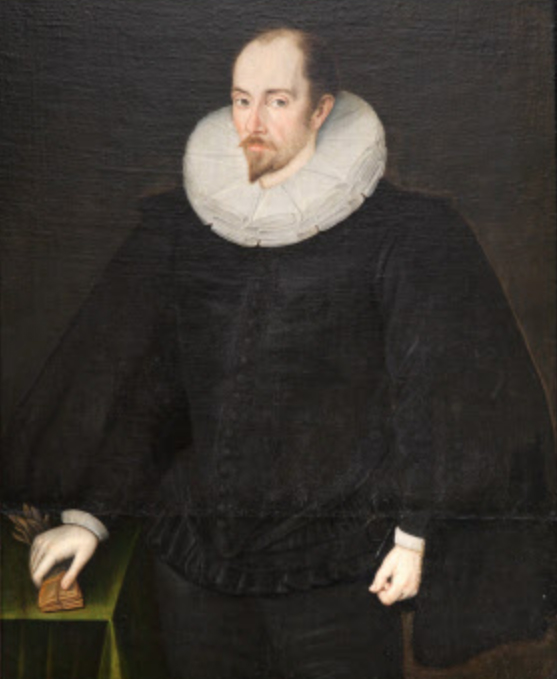
- Tudor Gentleman, thought to be Sir Henry Cavendish

Member of Parliament for Derbyshire
- In office 1572–1596
- Preceded by: Robert Wennersley
- Succeeded by: John Harpur

Personal details
- Born: 1550 Derbyshire
- Died: 12 October 1616 (aged 65–66) Chatsworth, Derbyshire
- Parent(s): William Cavendish, Elizabeth Talbot, Countess of Shrewsbury

Sir Henry Hardwick Cavendish (1550–1616) was the eldest son of the Tudor courtier Sir William Cavendish, and Elizabeth Hardwick, Countess of Shrewsbury (c. 1527–1608), known as "Bess of Hardwick". A Knight of the Shire for Derbyshire, he offered military service to Queen Elizabeth in the Netherlands as a captain in 1578; conducted several trade expeditions across Europe and into the Islamic Near East (Constantinople); served as High Sheriff of Derbyshire twice (1582 and 1608) and was elected as Member of Parliament for Derbyshire five times.

Though eldest son, Cavendish was disinherited by his mother after a complete breakdown in their relationship due to his friendship with Mary, Queen of Scots, and support for his niece, Arbella Stuart.

After his mother's death in 1608, Cavendish inherited Chatsworth from his father's estate, though not its contents. He sold the house intact to his younger brother William, who later that year became the 1st Earl of Devonshire.

Sir Henry and his wife, Lady Grace Talbot Cavendish, daughter of George Talbot, 6th Earl of Shrewsbury and his wife Gertrude Manners, had no surviving children.

They are associated with and lived at Tutbury Castle, Chatsworth, and the Doveridge Estate.

Sir Henry was the father of over 8 illegitimate children. His eldest son, Henry Cavendish II (born 1576, of mother unknown) was acknowledged, educated, and married to Bridget Willoughby, daughter of Sir Percival Willoughby and Lady Bridget Willoughby. Among their direct descendants are the Barons Cavendish of Dove; later the Barons Waterpark.

== Early life ==
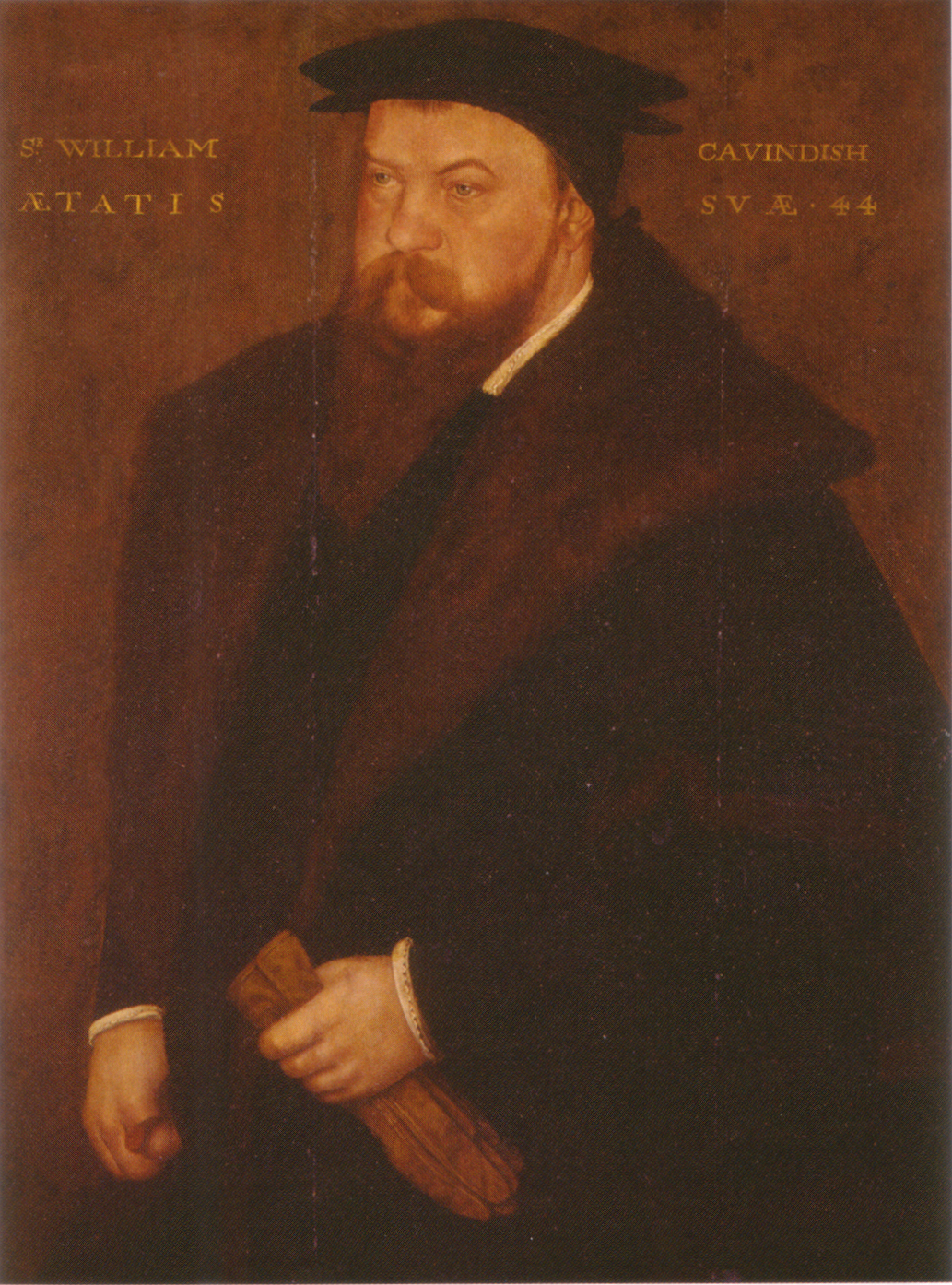
Sir Henry Cavendish's father, Sir William Cavendish, possibly painted by John Bettes the Elder.

Henry Cavendish was born 27 December 1550, the eldest son of the politician and courtier Sir William Cavendish and Lady Bess of Hardwick. Henry was christened in December 1550. His godparents included Lady Elizabeth Tudor, half-sister to the King (she became Queen Elizabeth I); also, Henry Grey, Marquess of Dorset (soon to be Duke of Suffolk, father of Lady Jane Grey), and John Dudley, Earl of Warwick, Duke of Northumberland.

Henry's father died 25 October 1557. Henry was raised with his younger siblings William, Charles, Elizabeth, and Mary at Chatsworth House, which was completed by his mother in the 1560s, and where she lived from time to time with her third husband Sir William St Loe (1518–1565) Captain of the Queens Guard, and fourth husband, George Talbot, 6th Earl of Shrewsbury.

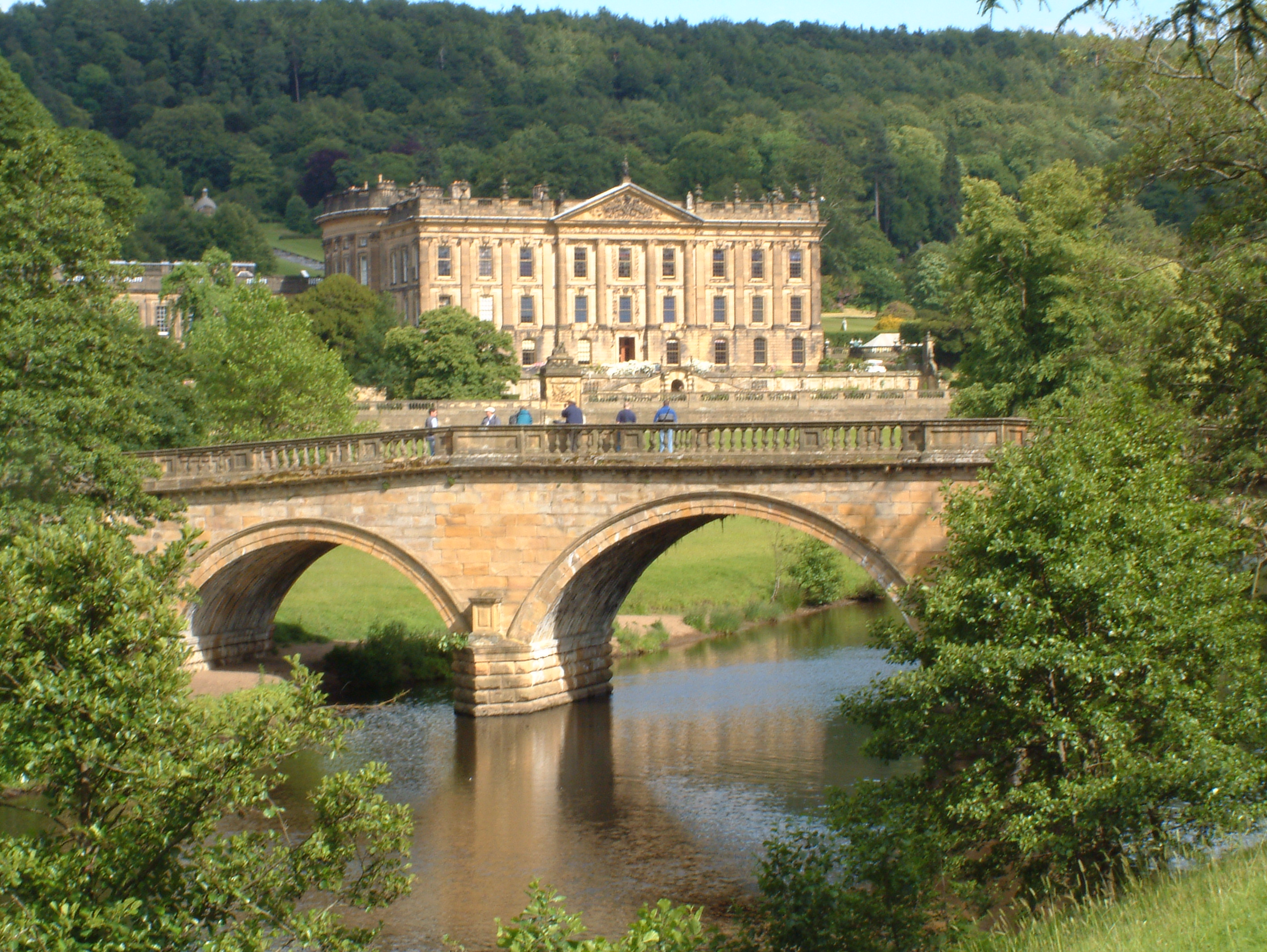
Chatsworth House- Childhood home and inheritance of Sir Henry Cavendish- built by Sir William Cavendish and wife, Lady Bess of Hardwick

Henry's childhood was described by his brother William as mutually golden and full of festivity in spite of the loss of their father when young. Their Grandmother, Elizabeth Leake, provided stability and oversight to the four young Cavendish children during their mother's frequent absences at court. Their mother loved to be home with them, making every effort and investing much in travel to and from Chatsworth and London. Lady Bess, originally a country lass from Derbyshire, made sure all of the seasonal and religious celebrations brought cheer to their home. She supported her children well through their education, travel, and careers while also negotiating highly strategic marriages for each.

On 9 February 1568, Henry (aged 17) married Lady Grace Talbot (aged 8) at St Peter's, Sheffield as a double ceremony. His sister, Mary Cavendish (aged 12) married Shrewsbury's eldest son Gilbert Talbot (aged 16). Both couples were matched as part of the prenuptial agreement and condition upon which Henry's mother, Lady Bess, would agree to marry George Talbot, the Earl of Shrewsbury, Grace's widowed father. After the wedding, Henry was sent abroad with his brother-in-law and step-brother and lifelong friend, Gilbert Talbot.

He returned to England and entered politics. He commenced family life by 1574 when Grace was 14.

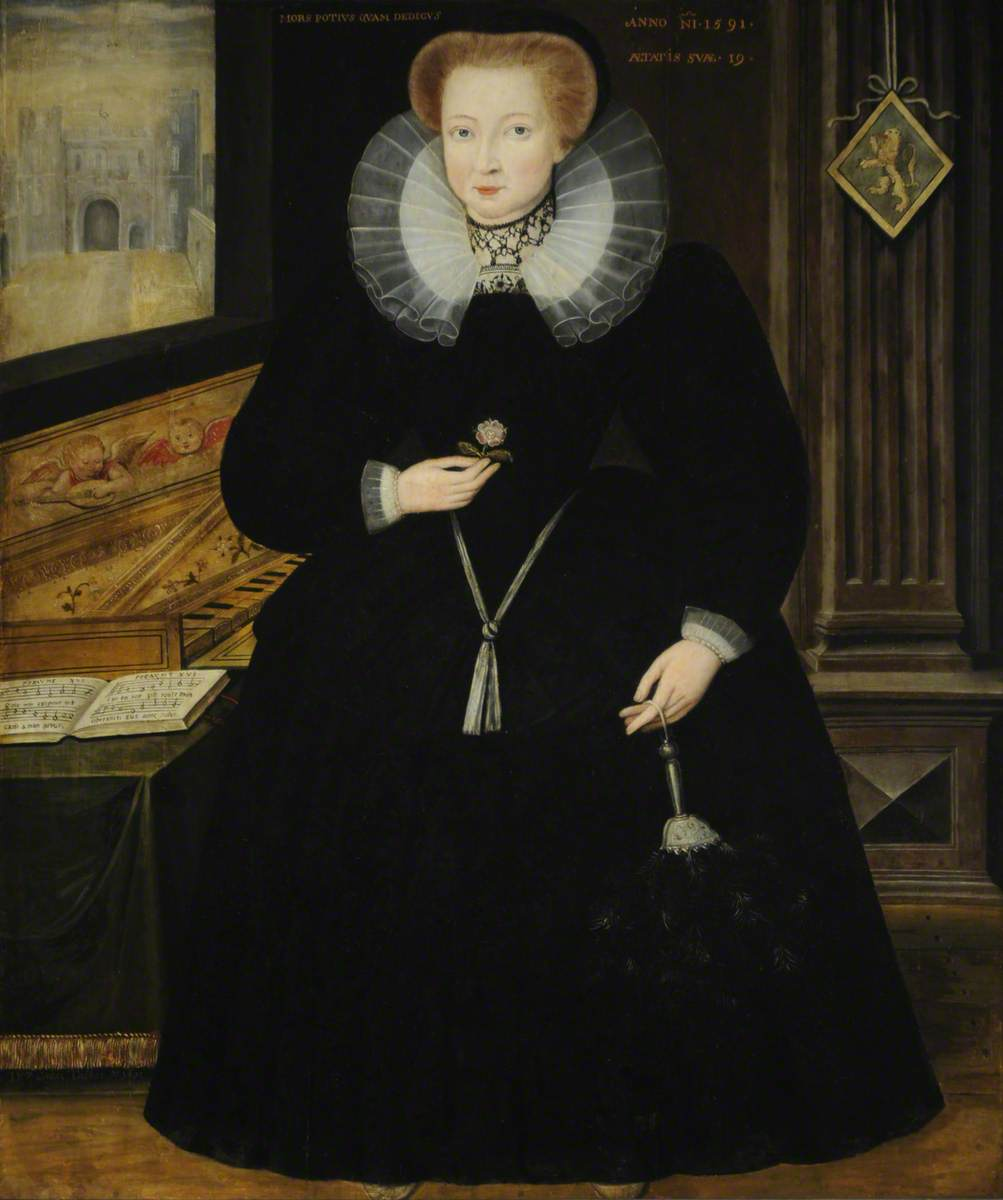
Lady Grace Talbot (1562–after 1625), Mrs. Henry Cavendish in 1591

See Portrait of Grace: Lady Grace Talbot, Mrs. Henry Cavendish (b.1562 – after 1625) 1129101 | National Trust Collections

Upon attaining his majority, Cavendish received the income from lands settled upon him by his father, income which had, until then, gone to his mother who was formerly granted his wardship. This income would not prove sufficient to cover Henry's lifestyle or debts.

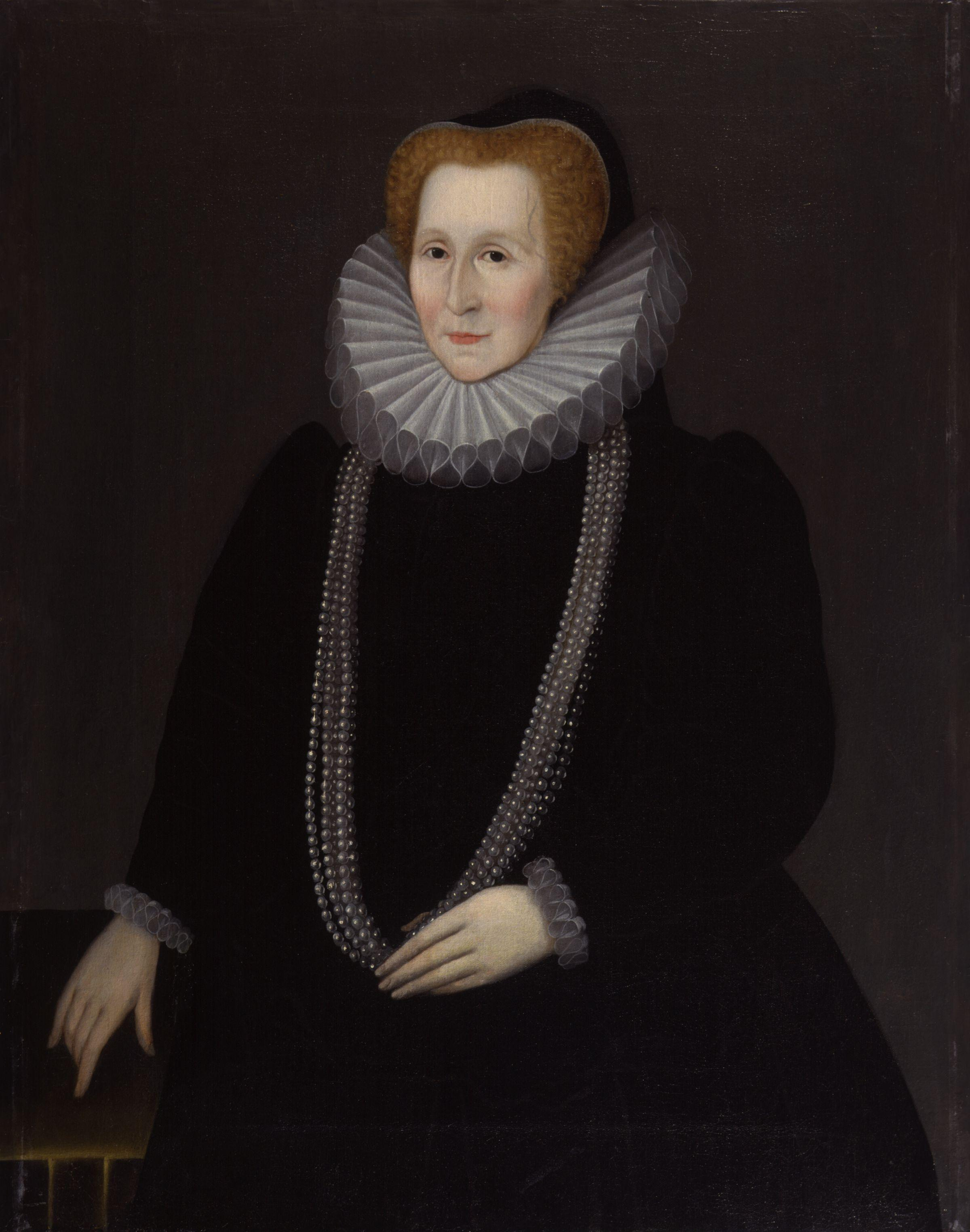
Lady Elizabeth Cavendish of Hardwick, later Countess of Shrewsbury. Also known as Bess of Hardwick

His eldest son was born in 1576 (of Mother unknown. Not Henry's young bride.)

Henry and Grace's marriage is said to have been an unhappy one, but Grace's letters to Lady Bess seem to indicate otherwise; expressing an affection for her husband, though she is frank to admit the suffering of their perpetual state of financial insecurity. The couple had no surviving children.

== Education ==
Henry Cavendish, at 10 years old, had attended Eton in 1560, four years after his father death.

He also received private tutoring and entered Gray's Inn by 1566–67, age 16-17..

To complete his education Cavendish was sent abroad in 1568, age 18 (immediately following marriage to his stepfather's eight-year-old daughter). He travelled to Germany, Padua, and Venice with his brother-in-law Gilbert Talbot, later 7th Earl of Shrewsbury.

The diary of his journey still survives among the Hardwick manuscripts. Among other colourful descriptions he described the city of Venice as, "a most foul stinking sink".

== Career ==
=== Military service ===
As a young man, perhaps under the guidance of his stepfather Sir William St Loe (Captain of the Guard for Elizabeth I), Cavendish had trained to proficiency in arms and later "won repute as a soldier". A man of passion, adventure, and courage (if not managerial skill) Henry eschewed the dandified life at court, as well as a settled home life, and registered for military service in 1574, age 24, to serve his country as a Volunteer Captain in the Netherlands in 1578, during the Dutch Revolt. Cavendish led a force of around 500 men, mostly from his family estates, and successfully fought off an attack by Spanish tercios led by Don Juan of Austria during the Battle of Rijmenam. War, however, was costly, and the expense of campaigning in the Netherlands, particularly to supply and transport his men, was likely the initial cause of his considerable debts, which amounted to £3,000 by 1584.

=== Politics ===
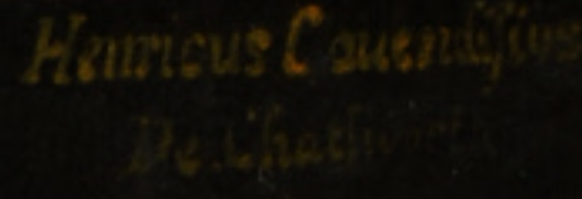
Henry's Formal Name "Henricus Cavendissius / De Chatsworth" is found within a youthful male portrait (upper right-hand corner), circa 1565, which originated from The Hardwick Collection. In spite of this evidence, and "Henry Cavendish" in brass plaque on the frame, this portrait is currently attributed as one of Robert Dudley to whom Henry bore a striking resemblance. The contested portrait can be viewed as "Robert Dudley, Earl of Leicester", National Trust Collections

Cavendish entered politics in his early twenties, becoming the Member of Parliament for the County of Derbyshire for almost 20 years. He was returned to office over five successive elections, in 1575, 1584, 1586, 1589 and 1593. This remarkable record of success may have been supported by the influence of his stepfather, the Earl of Shrewsbury. Record of his contribution in the Parliamentary journals is limited, raising the question of his actual interest in politics and government. However, as a Member of the British Parliament- Knight of the Shire- he did sit on a committee of the house in March 1575, and again in December 1584. He was subsequently appointed to subsidy committees on 24 February 1585, 11 February 1589 and 26 February 1593, and to a legal committee 9 March 1593.

=== Shrievalty ===
Henry took up occupation as the High Sheriff of Derbyshire in 1582–3. His brother William was also later appointed High Sheriff of Derbyshire in 1595. Henry again took on the work of Sheriff the year his mother died in 1608–9. The role involved duties as a ceremonial county or city official.

=== Travels in the East and European Trade Expeditions ===
Inspired by the travels of his youth, as well as recognising the potential for trade, Henry had embarked on a journey to Portugal in 1579. As this trip occurred between the early active years of his political career as a Member of Parliament, and immediately following his campaign in the Netherlands, it is worth considering if he may have been tasked also with government interests or official business.

Ten years later, in 1589, he was commissioned by his mother and father-in-law, to conduct a trade expedition to Constantinople. This trip took place just as Queen Elizabeth desperately sought to strengthen foreign policy and trade ventures across the Ottoman Empire and beyond. The Protestant Queen was at war with Catholic Portugal and Spain and no longer had access to their nations as trading partners, or to their allies. Instead, she had been fostering trade agreements with the wider Islamic world since the 1560s but her influence and relationships were weakening toward the end of her life. Edward Barton was the Queens trade ambassador, resident in Constantinople in 1589; someone Henry is likely to have met. Much of England's trade aims would have likely been brokered by Jewish mediators who regularly acted in the region as trade and political intermediaries between the sultans and Anglo-merchants. Also, highly influential and someone Henry may have met, Safiye Sultan, queen mother of the royal harem and her kiva, the Jewish Esperanza Malchi.

There was much fascination with the Islamic world in England at the time of Henry's adventurous journey. The wealthy of England could not get enough of their "oriental" rugs, fabrics, baubles (jewellery), sweet wines, sugar and spice while the Sultans were keenly interested in British arms. Protestantism and Islam were also theologically aligned in their abolition of idolatry and resistance to Catholic domination.

Henry's servant-companion Mr. Fox, kept an account of this journey now published as Mr. Harrie Cavendish, his Journey To and From Constantinople, 1589 Fox, His Servant

Henry's trade ventures proved successful to forward the Earl of Shrewsbury's extensive mineral trade interests. Lady Elizabeth (also called "Building Bess") was also supplied with some of the finest furnishings in England for the magnificent homes she designed. Henry is said to have had an eye for high quality design and returned with many Chinese silks, Persian or Anatolian carpets, and Gujarati embroidered bed-covers, as well as extensive networks across the Far East and Europe to arrange further import.

By 1601, it is said that his mother had amassed a collection of imported goods that included 46 Turkish carpets and a commissioned set of three large, Belgian embroidered wall hangings depicting the cardinal virtues: Hope, Faith, Love for her homes at Chatsworth and Hardwick Hall. The Elizabethan era of Islamic trade would end, however, soon after Henry's trip to Constantinople with the death of Queen Elizabeth in 1603 and the ascension of James 1 who had no interest in pursuing further alliance of this nature.

== Personal life ==
Embarking upon marriage proper in 1574, Henry and Grace had moved into Tutbury Castle, one of the more derelict of Graces fathers' properties, and set to work with renovations and the establishment of their own household. The management of such an estate, however, proved tumultuous for the young couple.

It appears that soon after their arrival two servants, who had been with the family for a long time and for whom Henry had a strong affection, fought an unexpected dual wherein one of them was killed. The two servants were named Swenerton and Langeford; it was Swenerton who won the duel and killed Langeford. The day after, Henry Cavendish wrote a letter to his mother Bess of Hardwick to break the news.

To my Lady.

To my lorde of some affecte

to my Lady

Maye yt please your Honor, I thought yt good to let your Ladyship vnderstande of a mysfortune that happened in my howse. On thursday at nyght last at supper ij of my men fell owt abowte some tryflynge woordes and to all theyr felloes iudgementes that harde theyr iangelynge, wear made good ffrendes agayne, and went and Laye togeether that nyghte, for they had byn bedfelloes of longe before, and loved one thother very well as every boddye tooke yt in the howse. On ffryday mornynge very early, by breake of daye they wente forthe, by name Swenerton, and Langeford with ij swordes a peece, as the sequele after showed, and in the fyeldes foughte together, and in fyghte, Swenerton shlewe Langeford, to my great greyfe booth for the sodeyne deathe of the one, and for the vtter dystructyon of the tother whom I loved very well. Good Madam let yt not trowble you in any thynge, we are mortall, and borne to many and strange adventures, and thearfore must temper owr myndes to bear shuche burthens as shall be by God layd on owr shoulders. My greattest greyffe, and so I iudge yt wyll be some trowble to your Ladyship that yt shoulde happen in my howse alas madam what coulde I dooe with yt, altogether not once suspectynge any thynge betwyxte them. I haue byn ryghte sorofull full for yt, and yt hath trowbled and vexed me, more then in reason yt should haue donne a wyese man. I would to God I could forget that theyr never had byn any shuch matter. Vpon the facte donne I sent for Master Adderley, and vsed hys counsell in all thynges. Swenerton ffledde presently, and ys pursued but not yet harde of. Thus humbly cravynge your Ladyship's dayly blessynge I end, more then sadde to trowble your Ladyship thus longe with thys sorrofull matter. Tutbury thys present Saturday.

Your Ladyship's most bounden humble and obedyent sonne:

Henry Cavendyshe.

Danielle Everton proposes that: "Swenerton, despite being pursued, was not yet caught; in fact it seems he had been permitted to flee. Considering the blatant affection that Henry Cavendish felt for him, it is entirely possible that he was perhaps trying to help Swenerton to escape the law, or at least delay it."

Henry became restless and was much away from home from this time. The following year he was elected to parliament, taking him often to London; two years later he headed off to war; and the following year he took up continental travel and trade.

Reputedly unhappy in his marriage, and unable or unwilling to produce a legitimate living heir with his wife, Cavendish pursued extra-marital liaisons. At one point he accused his wife of the same, but her portrait proclaims "Loyalty" as one of her highest values. He was popularly known as "the common bull of Derbyshire and Staffordshire" and a libertine. Sadly, as his immoral behaviour was no different to many other a promiscuous peer of this era, the possibility of politically motivated libel or biased historic narrative must be considered. There is an alternate narrative that he cared deeply for one mistress, the love of his life and mother of his children, working tirelessly for she and their children's welfare. This offers another possible reason for Henry's ongoing issue of debt (in the support of two households), and also a deeply sad reason for the lifelong suffering of his wife, Lady Grace. Tragedy seems to have hallmarked both of their lives.

=== Mary Queen of Scots ===
In about 1585, Cavendish and his wife were living at Tutbury Castle when the Tudor courtier Amias Paulet made arrangements for Mary Stuart, Queen of Scots to be sent there. Cavendish, knowing the formidable cost to his father in laws estate during his tenure as keeper of Mary, Queen of Scots between 1569 and 1585, was reluctant to make way for the royal prisoner and her considerable entourage without reimbursement. He asked £100 a year for the use of his home, or as an alternative, that his godmother, Queen Elizabeth I should lend him £2,000 towards the repayment of his debts. Paulet reported to the Queen that "This is his final answer....‘and in my simple opinion is not much different from reason’, but added that "It may be, although he doth not say it, that he will be content with the loan of £1,500".

Henry and Grace had known Queen Mary almost as a member of the family, since 1569, and were among the very few who had long association and interaction with her during her incarceration at their parents homes. True friendship had developed with the Scottish Queen, and Henry may have taken a quiet interest in her goals and ambition. When a suspicion arose in January 1586 that Queen Mary's letters were received by a local gentlewoman, Amias Paulet noted that Grace Cavendish was her old acquaintance.

=== Children ===
It is believed that Sir Henry fathered at least eight illegitimate children and, unusually for the day, acknowledged some of them. The identity of his eldest sons mother is unknown, but she is believed to have been a peer as this child was accepted among the upper echelons and married into it. His acknowledged children include:

- Henry Cavendish II, Esquire (1576–1624), Sir Henry's eldest illegitimate son, who married Bridget Willoughby 14 October 1610. Bridget was the daughter of Sir Percival and Lady Bridget Willoughby of Wollaton Hall, Nottingham. The Willoughby family's many trade interests overlapped with the Cavendish family. From this couple descend the Barons Cavendish of Doveridge (Later the Barons of Waterpark), and the American family branch of William Hunter Henderson Cavendish (born at Doveridge, Derbyshire, in 1734, second son of Sir Henry John Cavendish, 1st Baronet Cavendish of Dove, and his wife Anne Pyne.) William Hunter Cavendish migrated (1756/1760?) from Ireland, where he had been raised and was suspected of having developed Catholic sympathies, to Warm Springs, West Virginia, USA in pursuit of freedom of religion.
- Anne (Cavendish) Lowe (born 11 March 1594, in London, England). Anne married Vincent Lowe, Esq., of Denby, Derbyshire,1613, in Denby, Derbyshire, and had a large family. They were the parents of at least 8 sons and 10 daughters. She died on 12 October 1661, at the age of 67, and was buried in Denby, Derbyshire, England. Her grandson Colonel Henry Lowe emigrated to Maryland and became a planter and politician.

At least two of Henry's children were presented to Lady Bess, his mother, at some stage in their small lives, and it is recorded that she gave them each a gift.

=== Disinheritance ===
Despite being the eldest son, and working often at cost in his mother's service, Cavendish was later disinherited by Lady Bess, from whom he had become estranged. There are several possible reasons for her decision:

1) Henry had failed to produce a legitimate dynastic heir with Grace Talbot, to inherit (from her father) the Earl of Shrewsbury's property.

2) When Bess's marriage with the 6th Earl of Shrewsbury fell into difficulties, Cavendish sided with his stepfather against his mother.

3) His mother also objected to Henry's friendship with Mary Queen of Scots, Bess's nemesis.

(Bess had accused Mary of seducing her husband and possibly bearing him two children, contributing to the breakdown of trust and eventual separation of Bess and the Earl. Bess later publicly denied participation in dissemination of this widespread rumour and refuted any personal accusation of inappropriate relations between her husband and Queen Mary.). For her part, Queen Mary attributed their animosity to her own great displeasure with Bess upon discovery that she was secretly raising Arabella Stuart (Mary's niece and a girl to whom she had shown great kindness to during their mutual confinement in Bess's homes) with designs to weaken her own claim and place the girl on the throne.

4) Bess later claimed a subsequent unforgivable offence by her son, Henry, including his attempt to help his niece, Arbella Stuart, escape from Bess's oppressive "care". It was his collaboration during the botched rescue attempt with Stapleton, a Yorkshire Catholic, that proved to be the last straw. This infuriated Bess of Hardwick so much that she forever after referred to her eldest as "my bad son Henry".

Bess had maintained ever tightening control over her granddaughter, Arbella, even keeping her under house guard as she was a potential contender to the throne after Arbella's paternal aunt, Mary Queen of Scots, was executed in 1587. This situation prompted Henry to act. A rescue attempt occurred in 1602 just as Arabella had despaired of ever making an approved match and began to plot her own marriage to Edward Seymour. Both young people were claimants to the throne. (Arabella would later secretly marry his brother William.) With the help of a horse lent to her by her Uncle Henry Cavendish, Arabella sent a message to Edward via her most trusted servant, John Dodderidge. But Edwards father, the Earl of Hertford outed them to the Queen. On January 7, 1603, Sir Henry Brouncker, a messenger from Queen Elizabeth, arrived at Hardwick. He gave a letter to Bess and asked to speak with Arbella in private. Arbella was ordered to write her confession but would not comply. He eventually wrote it and she signed it, begging pardon from the Queen.

Henry somehow remained free, but he, and his niece Arbella were entirely written out of Lady Bess's will from this time. They were the two persons in whom she had invested the most to develop, and the two who continually frustrated her ambitions for their lives by insisting upon choosing their own path. Instead, his younger brother William, who was more amenable to their mother's guidance, was favoured. William later became the First Earl of Devonshire and inherited his mother's vast estates.

Henry was suspected of Catholic sympathies, communication and interest in Scottish and Continental politics, and later of involvement in the Bye and Main Plot, which led James VI and I to arrest Henry Brooke, Lord Cobham and Walter Raleigh in 1603. Nothing was proven, however, and his complicity deemed unlikely (he had campaigned years before against the Spanish and Hapsburgs and promoted alternate allies across the Muslim world.) Somehow, once again, Henry remained free.

Hot-headed Henry did receive an official reprimand by order on 30 May 1592. He was instructed to desist from hostility in a private armed feud which ensued between himself and William Agard (reason for conflict unknown). Both were engaged in pitched battle via their private armies until Henry's brother-in-law, Gilbert Talbot, 7th Earl of Shrewsbury intervened, asked the privy council that 'all matters of quarrell and pyke betwyxt them and theyrs' should be adjudicated by Robert Devereux Earl of Essex, and himself." Peace was soon after restored. (Gilbert Talbot, however, would later lose his seat on the Privy Council for he and his wife Mary's support of niece, Arabella Stuart.)

When Bess of Hardwick died on 13 February 1608, it appears that Cavendish did not attend his mother's funeral. Long estranged, he received nothing from her in her will. He did inherit Chatsworth from his father's estate after his mother's death, but without its contents; a hard blow for one who had chosen and supplied so much of it. As a result, and in order to pay off his debts, he sold the estate intact to his brother William the following year. William allowed Henry and Grace to live at Chatsworth until the time of Henry's death in 1616. Henry is buried at his brother's side in St. Peter's Church, Edensor, Derbyshire.

== Death and legacy ==
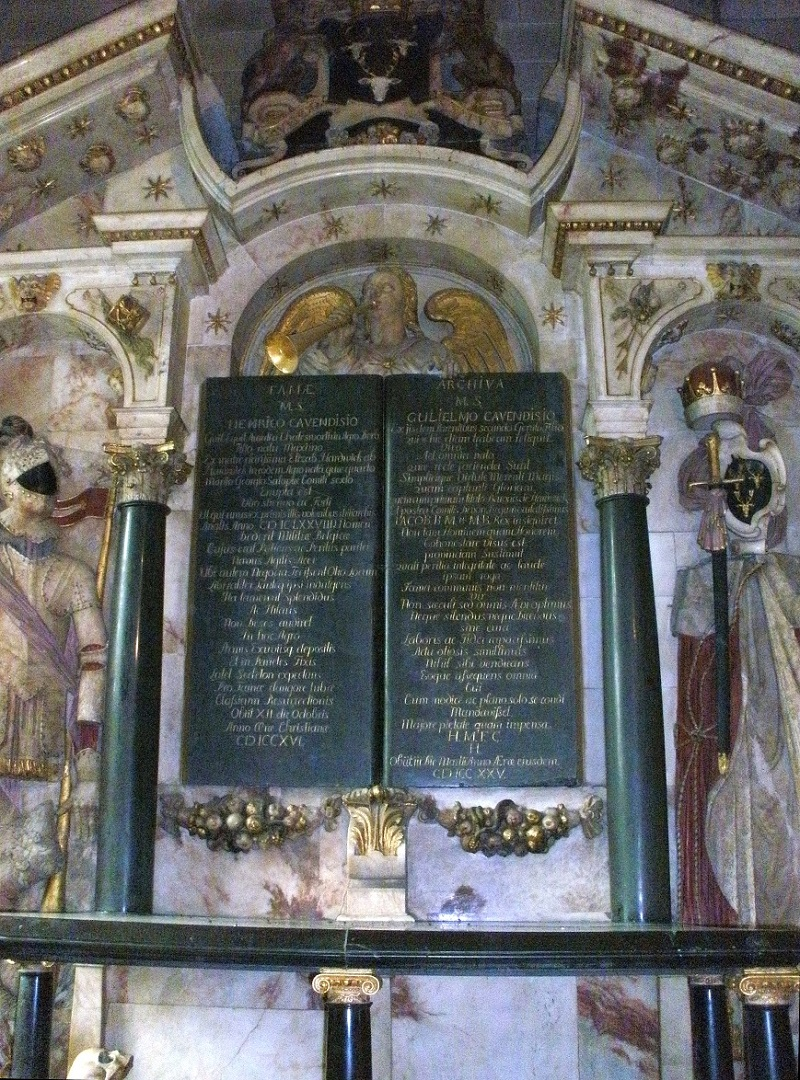
The Cavendish Memorial in St Peter's Church, Edensor

Sir Henry Cavendish died on 12 October 1616 at Chatsworth, Derbyshire, England.

The Cavendish Memorial, an early-17th-century church monument to Henry and his brother William, may have been designed by their mother prior to her death. It can be seen in St Peter's Church, Edensor, Derbyshire, where they are buried. Henry is symbolically depicted by his armour, which hangs on the wall, and a carved marble statue of Mars, the Roman God of War, by Maxamillion Colt.

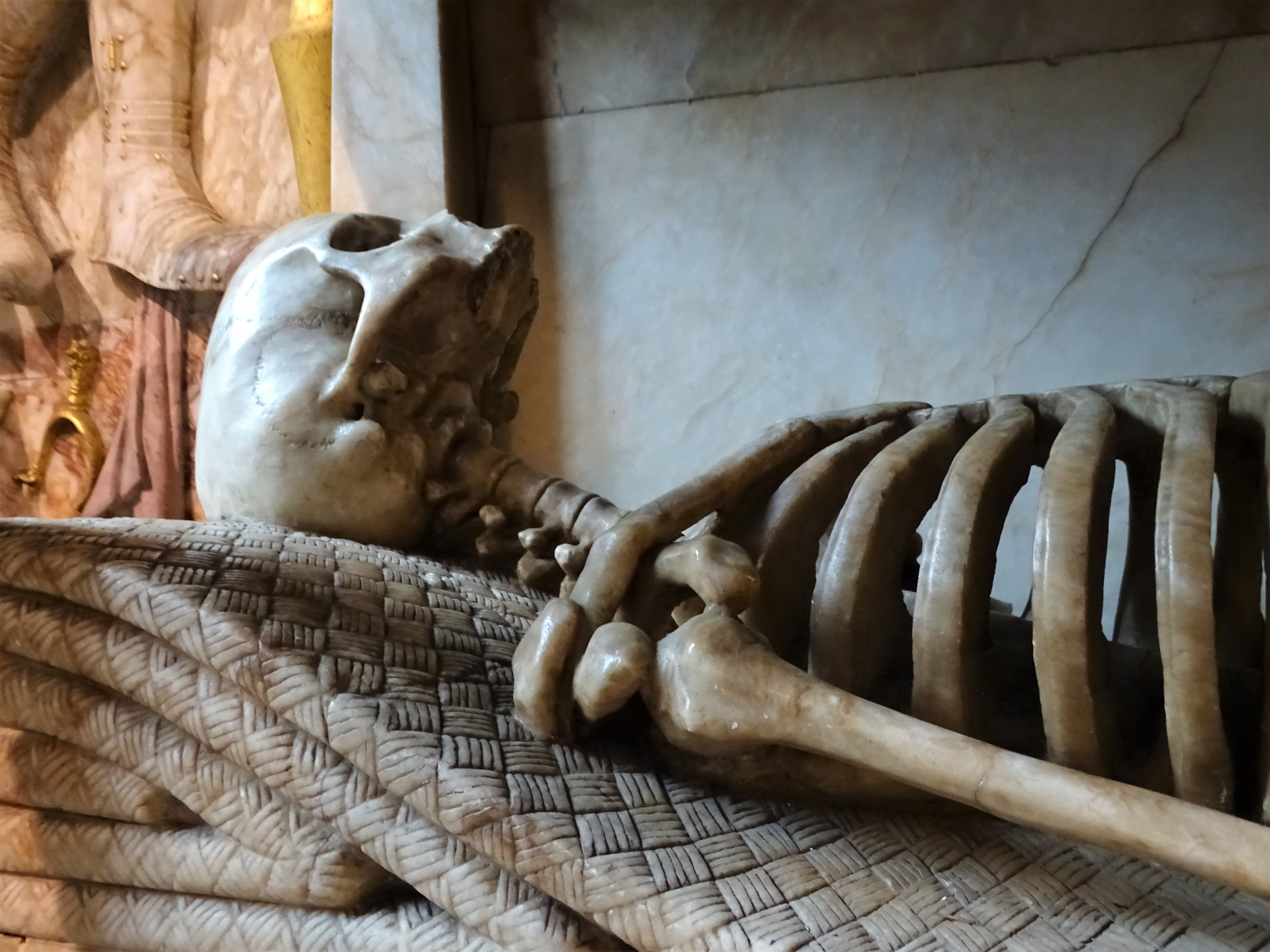
Effigy of Henry Cavendish- Soldier

The Latin inscription for the two brothers on the church monument reads as follows:

SACRED to the Memory of Henry,

eldest son of William Cavendish, Knight of Chatsworth, in the County of Derby, and of the much celebrated

Elizabeth Hardwick of Hardwick, in the same County, who afterwards

married her fourth husband, George Earl of Shrewsbury.

He was a strenuous and brave man, and particularly distinguished himself

among the English Volunteer Commanders in the campaign in the Netherlands,

in the year 1578, in which he displayed perseverance, skill, diligence,

activity, and fortitude.

When however his military engagements gave place to the enjoyment of ease,

he indulged in the liberal and sumptuous use of his fortune

in such a manner as to retain the character of splendour and festivity

and to avoid the reproach of luxurious indolence.

His Arms and Armour being deposited in this county,

and fixed in the wall, his Body lies here awaiting instead of the Clarion of Fame

the Trumpet of the Resurrection.

He died the 12th day of October in the year of our Lord 1616.

SACRED to the Memory of William Cavendish

the second son of the same parents, who also here put off his earthly dress.

He was a man born to fill every honourable Station,

and in the simplicity of his virtues deserving rather than courting Glory.

Whom when James the 1st of Blessed Memory, King of Great Britain,

had honoured with the Titles first of Baron Hardwick,

and afterwards Earl of Devonshire, he appeared not so much to

do Honour to the man as to the title, with what Wisdom, Integrity, and Applause,

he sustained the Duties of his Province; Common Fame is seldom false.

He was not only the best man of his own but of every age,

nor can his character be suppressed or spoken of without difficulty.

He was capable of the utmost diligence and of unsullied faith,

with the appearance of the greatest indolence.

He claimed no Honour and yet obtained all.

To Him having ordered that he might be buried

without splendour and in a plain grave,

this Monument is erected with an affection greater than its expense.

He died the third of March in the year of our Lord 1625.
