= Henry Cavendish, 4th Baron Waterpark =

British aristocrat

Henry Cavendish 4th Baron Waterpark
- Born: Henry Anson Cavendish; 14 April 1839
- Died: 3 August 1912 (aged 73)
- Education: Harrow School
- Occupations: aristocrat and sportsman
- Spouse: Emily Stenning (m. 1873)
- Children: 2 sons, 3 daughters
- Parents: Henry Cavendish, 3rd Baron Waterpark, MP (father); Honourable Elizabeth Jane Anson (mother)

Henry Anson Cavendish, 4th Baron Waterpark (14 April 1839 – 3 August 1912), was a British aristocrat and sportsman.

== Early life ==
Cavendish was born on 14 April 1839. He was the son of Henry Cavendish, 3rd Baron Waterpark, a member of parliament, and his wife, the Honourable Elizabeth Jane Anson, daughter of Thomas Anson, 1st Viscount Anson.

He was educated at Harrow School and afterwards left Britain to study French and German.

== Career ==
On his return to Britain he entered the Foreign Office and remained there until the death of the 3rd Baron on 31 March 1863, on which the bulk of the 3rd Baron's estate passed to the new 4th Baron, his only son.

As a sportsman, Lord Waterpark travelled to India in 1868, where he hunted big game, and to Canada and the United States in 1869, fishing in a salmon river in Labrador and (with George Armstrong Custer, among others) hunting buffalo and other big game in the United States, including in the Rocky Mountains.

In 1872, he became Master of the Meynell Hunt in Derbyshire. Lord Waterpark was commissioned as a cornet in the Uttoxeter Troop of the part-time Staffordshire Yeomanry cavalry on 23 January 1863, and was promited to lieutenant on 9 June 1866 and to captain on 28 June 1871. and was a magistrate for that county and a Deputy Lieutenant of Derbyshire. In 1899 he became chairman of Derbyshire County Council, for two years.

== Personal life ==
In 1873, Lord Waterpark married Emily Stenning, baptised 30 March 1845 in Godalming, Surrey, and they had five children:

- Mary (29 December 1873 – 15 May 1967)
- Henry Anson (3 March 1875 – 22 October 1897)
- Winifred (2 April or 26 June 1880 – 8 December 1971)
- Norah Lilian (27 October 1881 – 12 February 1932)
- Charles Frederick, 5th Baron Waterpark (11 May 1883 – 27 January 1932).

Lord Waterpark died on 3 August 1912 and was succeeded in his titles and estate by his surviving son, Charles Frederick Cavendish, who became the 5th Baron Waterpark.

Peerage of Ireland
| Preceded by Henry Cavendish | Baron Waterpark; 1863–1912 | Succeeded by Charles Cavendish |
