= Henry Lowe (politician) =

American colonist (1652–1717)

Deputy Commissioner of Maryland
- In office 1697–1697

Colonel of the Militia
- In office 1696–1696

Naval Officer for Patuxent
- In office 1684–1685

Justice of the Provincial Court
- In office 1694–1697

Sheriff
- In office 1698–1700

Personal details
- Born: 1652 Denby, Derbyshire, England
- Died: 1717 (aged 64–65) St. Mary's City, Maryland, Maryland, British America
- Spouse: Susanna Maria Bennett Lowe
- Children: 8
- Occupation: Planter, military officer, politician

Colonel Henry Lowe (1652-1717) was a planter, soldier and politician in Colonial Maryland. Born in Denby in Derbyshire in 1652, in 1674 Lowe sailed to Calvert County, Maryland where he was granted land by Lord Baltimore, and by 1695 had settled in St. Mary's County, Maryland. Lowe was an active member of the Maryland Provincial Assembly. He served in the Lower House of the Colonial Legislature in St. Mary's City, Maryland from 1701 to 1704. He also served as the Naval Officer for Patuxent from 1684 to 1685, as Justice of the Provincial Court from 1694 to 1697, and held a number of other colonial offices. He died in around 1717 in St. Mary's City, Maryland.

== Biography ==
=== Early life ===
Henry Lowe was born in Denby in Derbyshire in 1652. He was baptised in Denby on 10 July 1652. Lowe's father was John Lowe (1616-1659) and his mother was Katherine Pilkington of Stanley, Yorkshire. Henry Lowe's grandmother was Anne Cavendish, illegitimate daughter of Henry Cavendish, heir to the Chatsworth estate. Henry Lowe emigrated to the Province of Maryland in 1674, aged around 22, and was granted land in Calvert County by Lord Baltimore.

=== Politics ===
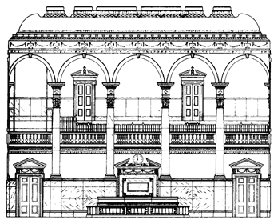
Maryland Colonial House of Delegates - Architectural Drawing

Lowe served in the Lower House of the Colonial Legislature, roughly equivalent to the English House of Commons, in St. Mary's City, Maryland from 1701 to 1704. The first Maryland assembly had convened in 1634. Lowe also served as the Naval Officer for Patuxent from 1684 to 1685, as Justice of the Provincial Court from 1694 to 1697, and held a number of other colonial offices, including Sheriff (from 1698 to 1700), Justice 1709, and Clerk 1709–1717. He was also Lieutenant Colonel from 1697 to 1704 and was a Colonel by 1712. He was Commander of the St. Mary's County militia in 1696 and served as and Deputy Commissioner in 1697.

in 1697 Lowe lost his post as a Provincial Court justice because he would not take the required oaths. Stricter enforcement of oath requirements designed to exclude Roman Catholics from public office, which followed the Protestant Revolution in 1689, most likely cost Henry Lowe his public posts. In 1709 his fortune changed again; his brother-in-law Edward Lloyd became Governor of Maryland, and Lowe was returned to office as justice and clerk.

=== Family ===
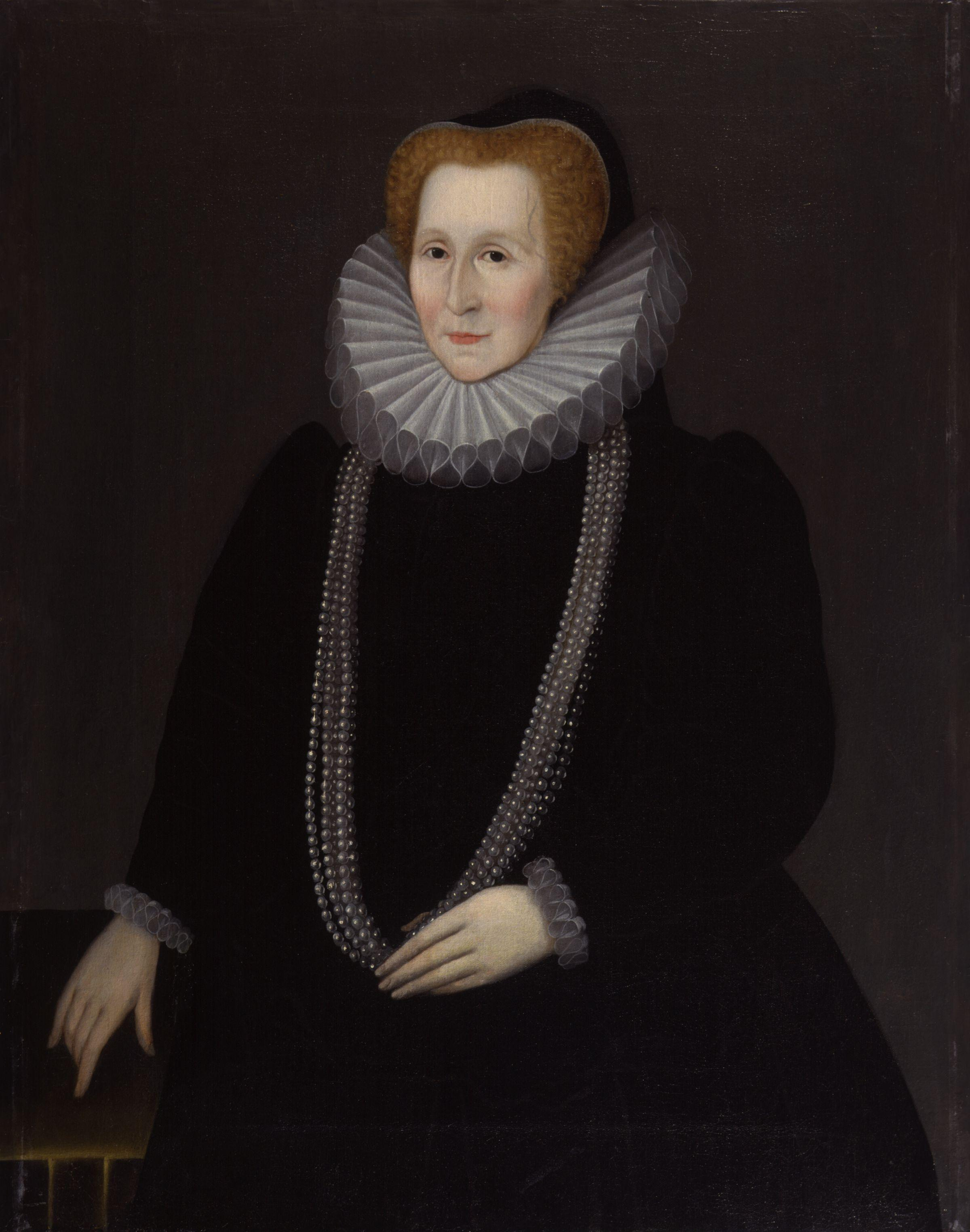
Bess of Hardick, Lowe's Great-great grandmother

Lowe married Susanna Maria Bennett Lowe, widow of John Darnall, on 18 May 1686. Maria was the daughter of Richard Bennett and his wife Henrietta Neale Unlike her husband, Susanna Bennett was a Roman Catholic. The couple had three sons and five daughters. Their daughter Elizabeth married Henry Darnall II, a wealthy Maryland planter.

== Death and legacy ==
Henry Lowe died in around 1717 in St. Mary's City. Over his lifetime he accumulated significant wealth, acquiring over 10,000 acres of land in Cecil County, Kent County, Prince George's County, St. Mary's County, Baltimore County, and Charles County.
