= Sir Richard Musgrave, 1st Baronet, of Tourin =

Irish writer and politician

Sir Richard Musgrave, 1st Baronet (c. 1757 – 7 April 1818) was an Irish writer and politician.

He was born the eldest son of Christopher Musgrave of Tourin, County Waterford, by Susannah, daughter of James Usher of Ballintaylor, near Dungarvan.

He was a Member of Parliament (MP) for Lismore from 1778 to 1801. On 2 December 1782 he was rewarded with a baronetcy for his loyalism and Protestantism. Musgrave was high sheriff of County Waterford and was firm in enforcing the law; in September 1786 he personally flogged a Whiteboy after no one else could be found to do it. In his works A Letter on the Present Situation of Public Affairs (1794 and 1795) and Considerations on the Present State of England and France (1796) he warned of impending rebellion in Ireland. After the defeat of the Irish Rebellion of 1798, Musgrave sought to exonerate the government from the accusation that it had provoked the rebellion by arbitrary rule in his address To the Magistrates, the Military, and the Yeomanry of Ireland (1798), writing under the pseudonym 'Callimus'.

In 1801 appeared his Memoirs of the different Rebellions in Ireland from the Arrival of the English, with a Particular Detail of that which broke out the 23rd of May, 1798; the History of the Conspiracy which preceded it, and the Characters of the Principal Actors in it. In 1894 the Dictionary of National Biography claimed that it was "so steeped in anticatholic prejudice as to be almost worthless historically". The book provoked a response from the Catholic Bishop of Ferns, James Caulfield, to which Musgrave replied with Observations on the Reply (1802).

According to J. J. Sack, the Memoirs of the different rebellions in Ireland was, along with Edmund Burke's Reflections on the Revolution in France, "the contemporary work which most defined the British Right". In this work, Musgrave criticised Burke's influence and called him a hypocrite who "always shewed a decided attachment to popery". He further accused him of trying to persuade the Rockingham Whigs to support Catholic emancipation, by which they "departed from those wise lessons which the history of and experiences of past ages uniformly afford, and adopted a visionary system of concession, which shook the pillars of the throne".

In 1804 he published Strictures upon an "Historical Review of the State of Ireland", by Francis Plowden, Esq., or a Justification of the Conduct of the English Governments in that Country, to which Plowden responded with his Historical Letter (1805).

The Dictionary of National Biography called Musgrave "a man of considerable talent, warped by blind prejudice and savage party spirit".

== Works ==
- A Letter on the Present Situation of Public Affairs (1794).
- Considerations on the Present State of England and France (1796).
- Camillus [pseudonym], To the Magistrates, the Military, and the Yeomanry of Ireland (1798).
- Veridicus [pseudonym], A Concise Account of the Material Events and Atrocities which Occurred in the Late Rebellion (1799).
- Short View of the Political Situation of the Northern Powers (1801).
- Memoirs of the Different Rebellions in Ireland (1801; 4th edn. ed. S. W. Myers and D. E. McKnight, 1995) ISBN 096439250X
- Observations on the Reply (1802).
- Strictures upon an "Historical Review of the State of Ireland", by Francis Plowden, Esq., or a Justification of the Conduct of the English Governments in that Country (1804).
- Observations on Dr. Drumgoole's Speech to the Catholic Board (1814).

== Notes ==
Parliament of Ireland
Preceded by James Gisborne; Sir Henry Cavendish, Bt	Member of Parliament for Lismore; 1778–1801; With: Sir Henry Cavendish, Bt (1778–1791); Robert Paul (1791–1796); George Ponsonby (1796–1798); Sir Henry Cavendish, Bt (1798–1801)	Succeeded by Parliament of the United Kingdom
Baronetage of Ireland
New creation	Baronet (of Tourin); 1782–1818	Succeeded by Christopher Musgrave
