= Sir Henry Cavendish, 1st Baronet =

British politician

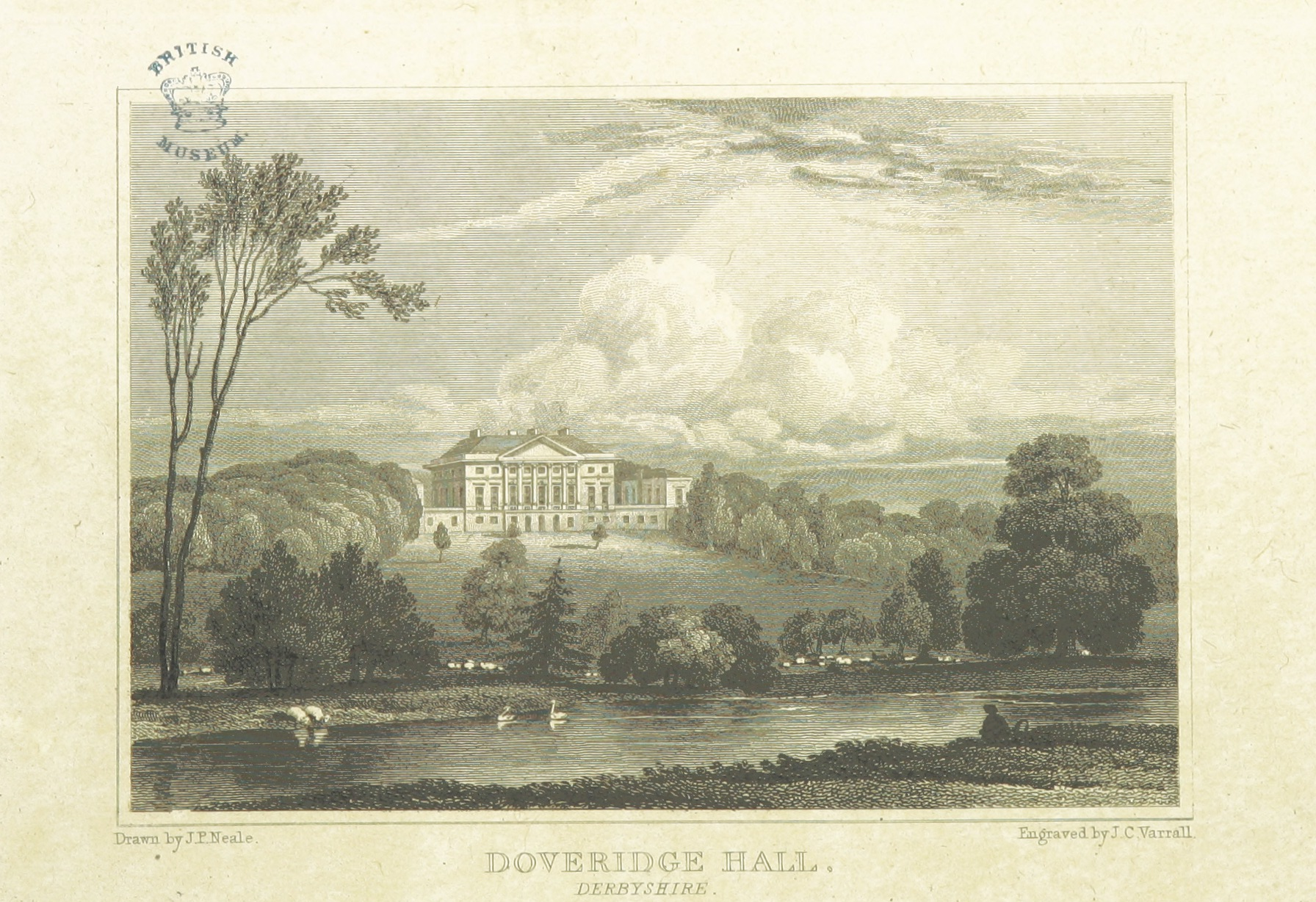
Doveridge Hall, Derbyshire

Sir Henry Cavendish, 1st Baronet (13 April 1707 – 31 May 1776), was a British politician who held several appointments in the Kingdom of Ireland.

== Biography ==
Cavendish was the son of William Cavendish and Mary Tyrell. He was descended from Sir William Cavendish, an ancestor shared with the dukes of Devonshire. Cavendish studied at University College, Oxford, matriculating on 17 August 1724.

He held the office of High Sheriff of Derbyshire in 1741. He was responsible for the construction of Doveridge Hall, in Doveridge, Derbyshire. He subsequently moved to Ireland, where he became Teller of the Exchequer in the Irish government and Collector for Cork in 1743. He became Commissioner of Revenue in Ireland in 1747. Cavendish was created a baronet on 7 May 1755, of Doveridge in the County of Derby, in the Baronetage of Great Britain. He was elected to the Irish House of Commons as the Member of Parliament for Lismore in 1761, serving until 1768. He was invested as a member of the Privy Council of Ireland on 9 June 1768.

Cavendish married firstly Anne Pyne, the daughter of Henry Pyne and Anne Edgecumbe, on 9 January 1730. Together they had six children. He married secondly Catherine Prittie, daughter of Henry Prittie and Elizabeth Harrison, on 4 October 1748, and they had one son. He was succeeded in his title by his eldest son, Sir Henry Cavendish, 2nd Baronet. His 2nd son William Hunter Cavendish baptized January 24, 1734/35 Parish Church Doveridge Derbyshire England went to Virginia from Ireland about 1756/1760 and became a member of the Virginia House of Delegates after the American Revolution.

Parliament of Ireland
Preceded by Ponsonby Moore; Richard Aldworth	Member of Parliament for Lismore; 1761–1768; With: Stephen Moore (1761–1766); Henry Cavendish (1766–1768); James Gisborne (1768)	Succeeded by Henry Cavendish; James Gisborne
Baronetage of Great Britain
New creation	Baronet of Doveridge Hall; 1755–1776	Succeeded by Henry Cavendish
