= William Hunter Cavendish =

American politician

The Hon. William Hunter Cavendish (c. 1735–1818) Baptized January 24,1734 Parish Church, Doveridge Derbyshire England 2nd son of Sir Henry Cavendish, 1st Baronet and his wife Anne Pyne. William migrated to Virginia from Ireland about 1756/1760. It has been suggested that William was raised in Ireland in order to enter Parliament as a knowledgeable representative. However, he may have developed an Irish sympathy deemed unacceptably strong, prompting his migration to the New World. It is believed that he held the principle of "freedom of religion" in high regard throughout his life. In America, he contributed as a lawyer; a landowner/farmer at Greenbriar; a Quarter-Master General during the Revolutionary war 1778-82; a founding board member of Washington College, Lexington, Virginia 1796; and an early American politician. He represented Greenbrier County in the Virginia House of Delegates 1790–1799 and 1802–1803, where he was affiliated with the Federalist Party.
