= Harry Lowe (footballer, born 1907) =

Scottish-born English footballer

Personal information
- Full name: Henry Pratt Lowe
- Date of birth: 24 February 1907
- Place of birth: Fife, Scotland
- Date of death: October 1988 (aged 81)
- Place of death: Wiltshire, England
- Height: 5 ft 8 in (1.73 m)
- Position: Inside forward

Senior career*
Years	Team	Apps	(Gls)
1928–1929	St Andrews United		
1929–1935	Watford	120	(41)
1935–1943	Queens Park Rangers		
- * Club domestic league appearances and goals

Henry Pratt Lowe (February 1907 – October 1988) was a professional footballer. Born in Scotland, Lowe started his career at St Andrews United in Scottish junior football, before moving to England to play in the Football League for Watford and Queens Park Rangers. During the Second World War, Lowe played as a guest for several professional clubs, including Watford, QPR, and Chelsea.
