= James Gisborne =

British Army officer (d. 1778)

Lieutenant-General James Gisborne

Member of Parliament for Tallow
- In office 1763–1768

Member of Parliament for Lismore
- In office 1768 – 20 February 1778

James Gisborne (died 1778) was a British Army officer and Member of the Irish Parliament.

== Biography ==
He was the son of James Gisborne, rector of Staveley, Derbyshire; Thomas Gisborne was his younger brother. He went to Ireland as page to the Duke of Devonshire, and had a successful career in the viceregal household. On 1 June 1739 he joined the Army with a commission as second lieutenant in Bissett's Regiment of Foot, and after a progressive service in the subordinate commissions, he was appointed lieutenant-colonel of the 10th Regiment in 1755, and was afterwards employed many years on the staff of Ireland, as quartermaster-general in that country.

In 1762 Gisborne was promoted to the rank of colonel of Foot, with command of the 121st Regiment, and on 4 March 1766 he was removed to the 16th Regiment. In 1770 Gisborne was persuaded by the Lord Lieutenant of Ireland, Lord Townshend, to resign his post as quartermaster-general in Ireland in favour of Simon Fraser, and was compensated with the sinecure of Governor of Kinsale. However, the government of Kinsale was then required for the outgoing adjutant-general, Robert Cuninghame, and Gisborne was granted a pension of £500 per annum until another government of greater value should become vacant; he became Governor of Charlemont from 8 September 1770. Gisborne was promoted to major-general in 1770, and to lieutenant-general in 1777. He served as Acting Commander-in-Chief of the Forces in Ireland, and commanded troops in the suppression of the Hearts of Steel unrest (1769 to 1772) in Ulster.

Besides his military career, Gisborne was Gentleman Usher of the Black Rod in the Irish Parliament from September 1757, and sat in the Irish House of Commons for Tallow from 1763 to 1768, and for Lismore from 1768 until his death on 20 February 1778.
