= Lismore (Parliament of Ireland constituency) =

Pre-1801 Irish constituency

- Former borough constituency for the Irish House of Commons
- County: County Waterford
- Borough: Lismore

–1801
- Replaced by: Disfranchised

Lismore was a parliamentary constituency represented in the Irish House of Commons until its abolition in 1800. Located in County Waterford, it returned two members to Parliament and was disenfranchised following the Acts of Union with Great Britain.

== Members of Parliament ==
- 1613–1615 Sir Richard Boyle and Francis Annesley
- 1634–1635 James Barry, later Lord Barry and Stephen Crowe
- 1639–1649 Sir John Browne and Stephen Crowe
- 1661–1666 Adam Loftus and William Fitzgerald

=== 1692–1801 ===
Election	First MP	Second MP
1692	George Rogers	Arthur Shaen
1703	Sir James Jeffreys	Arthur Shaen
1715	Thomas Meredyth	Arthur Shaen
1719	Sir John Osborne, 7th Bt	Arthur Shaen
1725	Sir John Osborne, 7th Bt	Hugh Dixon
1727	Noblett Dunscomb	Thomas Carter
1728	Noblett Dunscomb	Richard Aldworth
1745	William Bristow	Richard Aldworth
1758	Charles Boyle	Richard Aldworth
1759	Ponsonby Moore	Richard Aldworth
1761	Sir Henry Cavendish, 1st Bt	Stephen Moore
1766	Sir Henry Cavendish, 1st Bt	Henry Cavendish, 2nd Bt
1768	Sir Henry Cavendish, 1st Bt	James Gisborne
1776	Sir Henry Cavendish, 2nd Bt	James Gisborne
1778	Sir Henry Cavendish, 2nd Bt	Richard Musgrave
1791	Robert Paul	Richard Musgrave
1796	George Ponsonby	Richard Musgrave
1798	Sir Henry Cavendish, 2nd Bt	Richard Musgrave
1801	Constituency disenfranchised	
